= Elvis Presley =

American singer and actor (1935–1977)

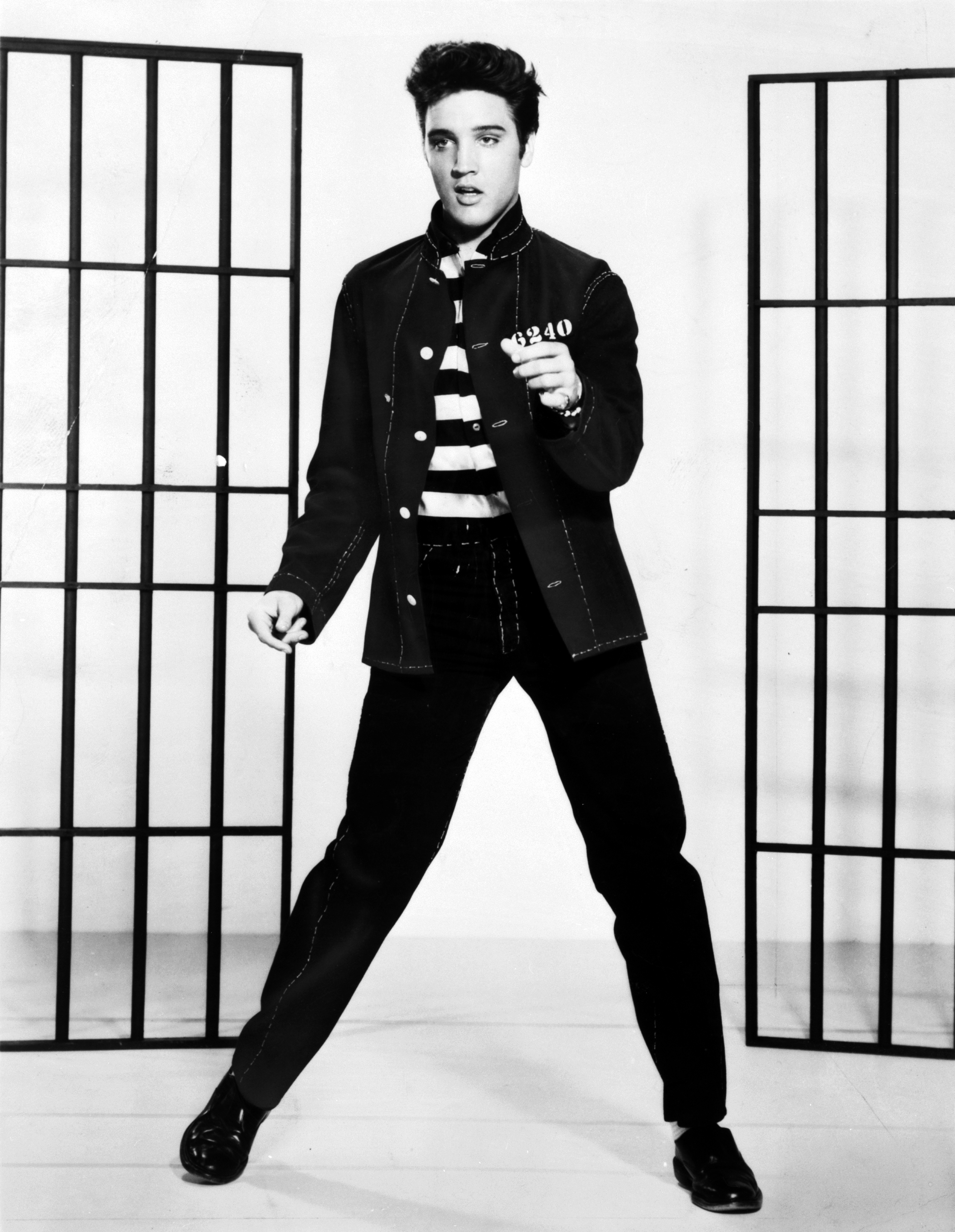
- Presley in 1957
- Born: Elvis Aaron Presley (Note: Although some pronounce his surname /ˈprɛzli/ PREZ-lee, Presley himself pronounced it /ˈprɛsli/ PRESS-lee, as did his family and those who worked with him. The correct spelling of his middle name has long been a matter of debate. The physician who delivered him wrote "Elvis Aaron Presley" in his ledger. The state-issued birth certificate reads "Elvis Aron Presley". The name was chosen after the Presleys' friend and fellow congregation member Aaron Kennedy, though a single-A spelling was probably intended by Presley's parents to parallel the middle name of Presley's stillborn brother, Jesse Garon. It reads Aron on most official documents produced during his lifetime, including his high school diploma, RCA Victor record contract, and marriage license, and this was generally taken to be the proper spelling. In 1966, Presley expressed the desire to his father that the more traditional biblical rendering, Aaron, be used henceforth, "especially on legal documents". Five years later, the Jaycees citation honoring him as one of the country's Outstanding Young Men used Aaron. Late in his life, he sought to officially change the spelling to Aaron and discovered that state records already listed it that way. Knowing his wishes for his middle name, Aaron is the spelling his father chose for Presley's tombstone, and it is the spelling his estate has designated as official.); January 8, 1935; Tupelo, Mississippi, US
- Died: August 16, 1977 (aged 42); Memphis, Tennessee, US
- Burial place: Graceland, Memphis
- Other names: Elvis; The King of Rock and Roll
- Occupations: Singer; actor; soldier
- Years active: 1953–1977
- Works: Albums; singles; songs; film and television
- Spouse: Priscilla Beaulieu (m. 1967; div. 1973)
- Children: Lisa Marie Presley
- Awards: Full list
- Musical career
- Genres: Rock and roll; pop; rockabilly; country; gospel; rhythm and blues; soul; blues
- Instruments: Vocals; guitar; piano
- Labels: Sun; RCA Victor; His Master's Voice (UK); Allied Artists
- Formerly of: The Blue Moon Boys; Million Dollar Quartet
- Military service
- Allegiance: United States
- Branch: United States Army
- Service years: 1958–1960
- Rank: Sergeant
- Units: Headquarters Company, 1st Medium Tank Battalion, 32d Armor, 3d Armored Division
- Awards: Good Conduct Medal

Elvis Aaron Presley (January 8, 1935 – August 16, 1977) was an American singer and actor. Referred to as the "King of Rock and Roll", he is widely regarded as one of the most culturally significant figures of the 20th century. Presley's energetic and sexually provocative performance style, combined with a mixture of influences across color lines during a transformative era in race relations, brought both great success and initial controversy.

Presley was born in Tupelo, Mississippi; his family moved to Memphis, Tennessee, when he was 13. He began his music career in 1954 at Sun Records with the producer Sam Phillips, who wanted to bring the sound of African-American music to a wider audience. Presley, on guitar and accompanied by the guitarist Scotty Moore on lead and the bassist Bill Black, was a pioneer of rockabilly, an uptempo, backbeat-driven fusion of country music and rhythm and blues. In 1955, the drummer D. J. Fontana joined to complete the lineup of Presley's classic quartet and RCA Victor acquired his contract in a deal arranged by Colonel Tom Parker, who managed him for the rest of his career. Presley's first RCA Victor single, "Heartbreak Hotel", was released in January 1956 and became a number-one hit in the US. Within a year, RCA Victor sold ten million Presley singles. With a series of successful television appearances and chart-topping records, Presley became the leading figure of the newly popular rock and roll, though his performing style and promotion of the then-marginalized sound of African Americans led to his being widely considered a threat to the moral well-being of white American youth.

In November 1956, Presley made his film debut in Love Me Tender. Drafted into military service in 1958, he relaunched his recording career two years later with some of his most commercially successful work. Presley held few concerts, and, guided by Parker, devoted much of the 1960s to making Hollywood films and soundtrack albums, most of them critically derided. Some of Presley's most famous films included Jailhouse Rock (1957), Blue Hawaii (1961), and Viva Las Vegas (1964). In 1968, he returned to the stage in the acclaimed NBC television comeback special Elvis, which led to an extended Las Vegas concert residency and several highly profitable tours. In 1973, Presley gave the first concert by a solo artist to be broadcast around the world, Aloha from Hawaii. Many years of substance abuse and unhealthy eating severely compromised his health, and Presley died in August 1977 at his Graceland estate at the age of 42.

Presley is one of the best-selling music artists in history, having sold an estimated 500 million records worldwide. (Note: The estimates of Elvis Presley's record sales vary from 500 million to 1 billion records worldwide.) He was commercially successful in many genres, including pop, country, rock and roll, rockabilly, rhythm and blues, adult contemporary, and gospel. Presley won three Grammy Awards, received the Grammy Lifetime Achievement Award at age 36, and has been posthumously inducted into multiple music halls of fame. He holds several records, including the most Recording Industry Association of America (RIAA)-certified gold and platinum albums, the most albums charted on the Billboard 200, the most number-one albums by a solo artist on the UK Albums Chart, and the most number-one singles by any act on the UK Singles Chart. He was ranked third on Rolling Stone's 100 Greatest Artists. In 2002, the compilation ELV1S topped charts worldwide.

== Life and career ==
=== 1935–1953: Early years ===
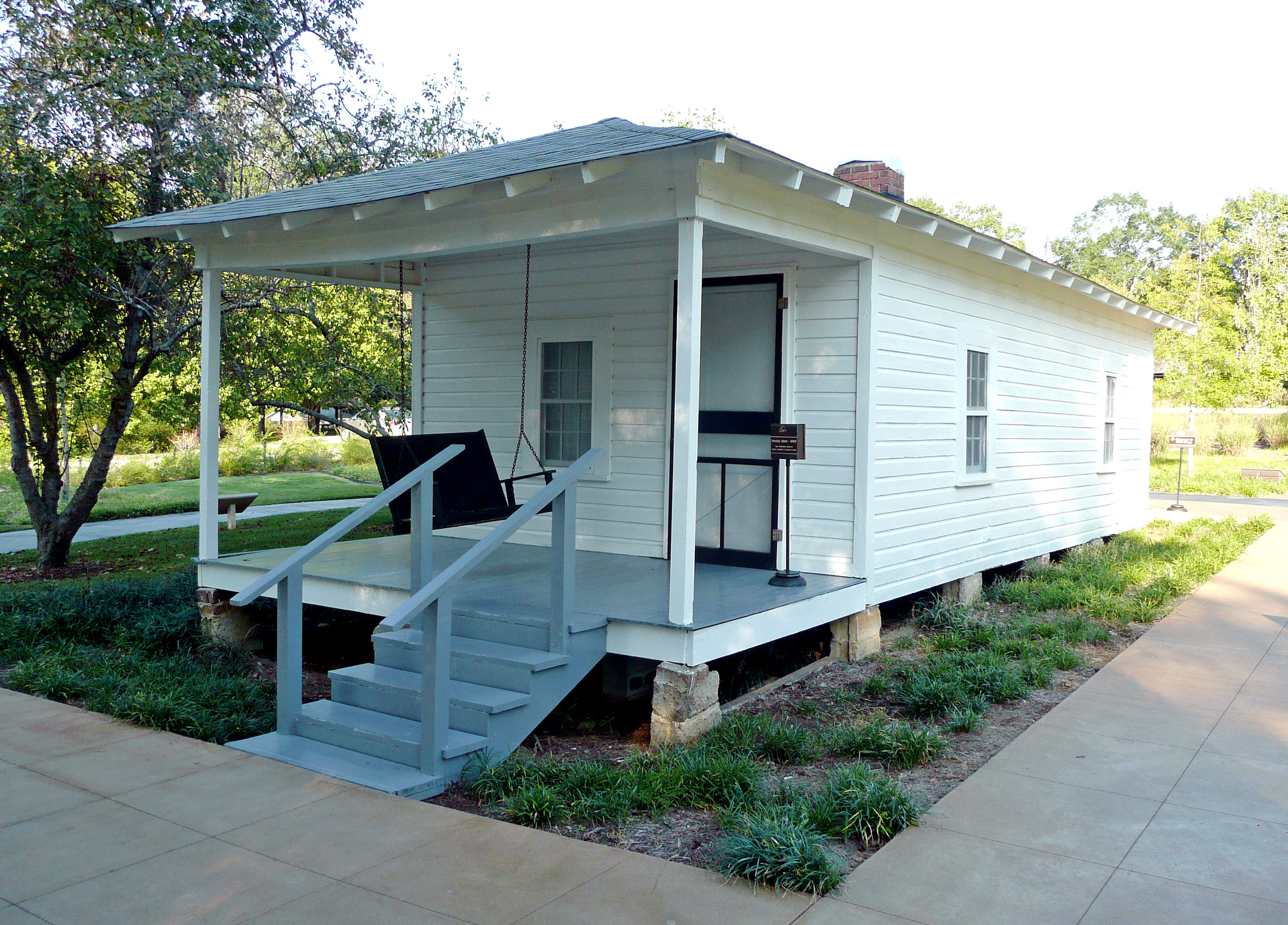
Presley's birthplace in Tupelo, Mississippi

Elvis Aaron Presley was born on January 8, 1935, in Tupelo, Mississippi, to Gladys Love (née Smith) and Vernon Presley. Elvis' twin Jesse Garon was stillborn 35 minutes earlier. Presley became close to both parents, especially his mother. The family attended an Assembly of God church, where he found his initial musical inspiration. Vernon moved from one odd job to the next, and the family often relied on neighbors and government food assistance. In 1938, they lost their home after Vernon was found guilty of altering a check and was jailed for eight months.

In September 1941, Presley entered first grade at East Tupelo Consolidated, where his teachers regarded him as "average". His first public performance was a singing contest at the Mississippi–Alabama Fair and Dairy Show on October 3, 1945, when he was 10; he sang "Old Shep" and recalled placing fifth. A few months later, Presley received his first guitar for his birthday; he received guitar lessons from two uncles and a pastor at the family's church. Presley recalled, "I took the guitar, and I watched people, and I learned to play a little bit. But I would never sing in public. I was very shy about it."

In September 1946, Presley entered a new school, Milam, for sixth grade. The following year, he began singing and playing his guitar at school. He was often teased as a "trashy" kid who played hillbilly music. Presley was a devotee of Mississippi Slim's radio show. He was described as "crazy about music" by Slim's younger brother, one of Presley's classmates. Slim showed Presley chord techniques. When his protégé was 12, Slim scheduled him for two on-air performances. Presley was overcome by stage fright the first time but performed the following week.

In November 1948, the family moved to Memphis, Tennessee. Enrolled at L. C. Humes High School, Presley received a grade of C in music in eighth grade. When his music teacher said he had no aptitude for singing, he brought in his guitar and sang "Keep Them Cold Icy Fingers Off Me". He was usually too shy to perform openly and was occasionally bullied by classmates for being a "mama's boy". In 1950, Presley began practicing guitar under the tutelage of Lee Denson, a neighbor. They and three other boys, including two future rockabilly pioneers, brothers Dorsey and Johnny Burnette—formed a loose musical collective.

During his junior year, Presley began to stand out among his classmates, largely because of his appearance: he grew his sideburns and styled his hair. He would head down to Beale Street, the heart of Memphis' thriving blues scene, and admire the wild, flashy clothes at Lansky Brothers. By his senior year, he was wearing those clothes. He competed in Humes' Annual "Minstrel" Show in 1953, playing Teresa Brewer's "Till I Waltz Again with You". Presley recalled that the performance did much for his reputation:

I wasn't popular in school ... I failed music—only thing I ever failed. And then they entered me in this talent show ... when I came onstage, I heard people kind of rumbling and whispering and so forth, 'cause nobody knew I even sang. It was amazing how popular I became in school after that.

Presley, who could not read music, played by ear and frequented record stores that provided jukeboxes and listening booths. He knew all of Hank Snow's songs, and he loved records by other country singers such as Roy Acuff, Ernest Tubb, Ted Daffan, Jimmie Rodgers, Jimmie Davis, and Bob Wills. The Southern gospel singer Jake Hess, one of his favorite performers, was a significant influence on his ballad-singing style. Presley regularly attended the monthly all-night singings downtown, where white gospel groups performed music influenced by African American spirituals. Presley listened to regional radio stations, such as WDIA, that played what were then called "race records": spirituals, blues, and the modern, backbeat-heavy rhythm and blues. Like some of his peers, he may have attended blues venues only on nights designated for exclusively white audiences. Many of his future recordings were inspired by local African-American musicians such as Arthur Crudup and Rufus Thomas. By the time he graduated from high school in June 1953, Presley had singled out music as his future.

=== 1953–1956: First recordings ===
==== Sam Phillips and Sun Records ====
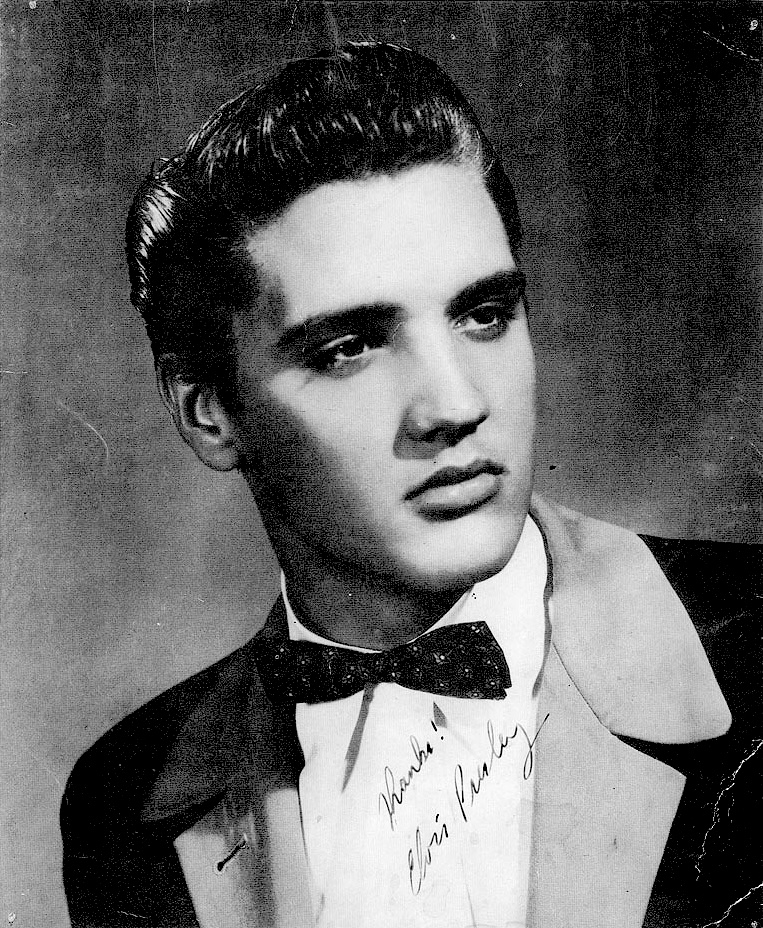
Presley in a Sun Records promotional photograph, 1954

In 1953, Presley checked into Memphis Recording Service, the company run by Sam Phillips before he started Sun Records. He aimed to pay to record a two-sided acetate disc: "My Happiness" and "That's When Your Heartaches Begin". He later claimed that he intended the record as a birthday gift for his mother, or that he was merely interested in what he "sounded like". Biographer Peter Guralnick argued that Presley chose Sun in the hope of being discovered. In January 1954, Presley cut a second acetate at Sun—"I'll Never Stand in Your Way" and "It Wouldn't Be the Same Without You"—but again nothing came of it. Not long after, he failed an audition for a local vocal quartet, the Songfellows, and another for the band of Eddie Bond.

"That's All Right"
Presley transformed not only the sound but the emotion of the song, turning what had been written as a "lament for a lost love into a satisfied declaration of independence."

Phillips, meanwhile, was always on the lookout for someone who could bring to a broader audience the sound of the black musicians on whom Sun focused. In June, he acquired a demo recording by Jimmy Sweeney of a ballad, "Without You", that he thought might suit Presley. The teenaged singer came by the studio but was unable to do it justice. Despite this, Phillips asked Presley to sing other numbers and was sufficiently affected by what he heard to invite two local musicians, guitarist Winfield "Scotty" Moore and upright bass player Bill Black, to work with Presley for a recording session. The session, held the evening of July 5, proved entirely unfruitful until late in the night. As they were about to give up and go home, Presley launched into a 1946 blues number, Arthur Crudup's "That's All Right". Moore recalled, "All of a sudden, Elvis just started singing this song, jumping around and acting the fool, and then Bill picked up his bass, and he started acting the fool, too, and I started playing with them." Phillips quickly began taping; this was the sound he had been looking for. Three days later, popular Memphis disc jockey Dewey Phillips played "That's All Right" on his Red, Hot, and Blue show. Listener interest was such that Phillips played the record repeatedly during the remaining two hours of his show. Interviewing Presley on-air, Phillips asked him what high school he attended to clarify his color for the many callers who had assumed that he was black. During the next few days, the trio recorded a bluegrass song, Bill Monroe's "Blue Moon of Kentucky", again in a distinctive style and employing a jury-rigged echo effect that Phillips dubbed "slapback". A single was pressed with "That's All Right" on the A-side and "Blue Moon of Kentucky" on the reverse.

==== Early live performances and RCA Victor contract ====
The trio played publicly for the first time at the Bon Air club on July 17, 1954. Later that month, they appeared at the Overton Park Shell, with Slim Whitman headlining. Here Elvis pioneered "Rubber legs", his signature dance movement. A combination of his strong response to rhythm and nervousness led Presley to shake his legs as he performed: His wide-cut pants emphasized his movements, causing young women in the audience to start screaming. Moore recalled, "During the instrumental parts, he would back off from the mic and be playing and shaking, and the crowd would just go wild."

Soon after, Moore and Black left their old band to play with Presley regularly, and disc jockey/promoter Bob Neal became the trio's manager. From August through October, they played frequently at the Eagle's Nest club, a dance venue in Memphis. When Presley played, teenagers rushed from the pool to fill the club, then left again as the house western swing band resumed. Presley quickly grew more confident on stage. According to Moore, "His movement was a natural thing, but he was also very conscious of what got a reaction. He'd do something one time and then he would expand on it real quick." Amid these live performances, Presley returned to Sun studio for more recording sessions. Presley made what would be his only appearance on Nashville's Grand Ole Opry on October 2; Opry manager Jim Denny told Phillips that his singer was "not bad" but did not suit the program.

==== Louisiana Hayride, radio commercial, and first television performances ====
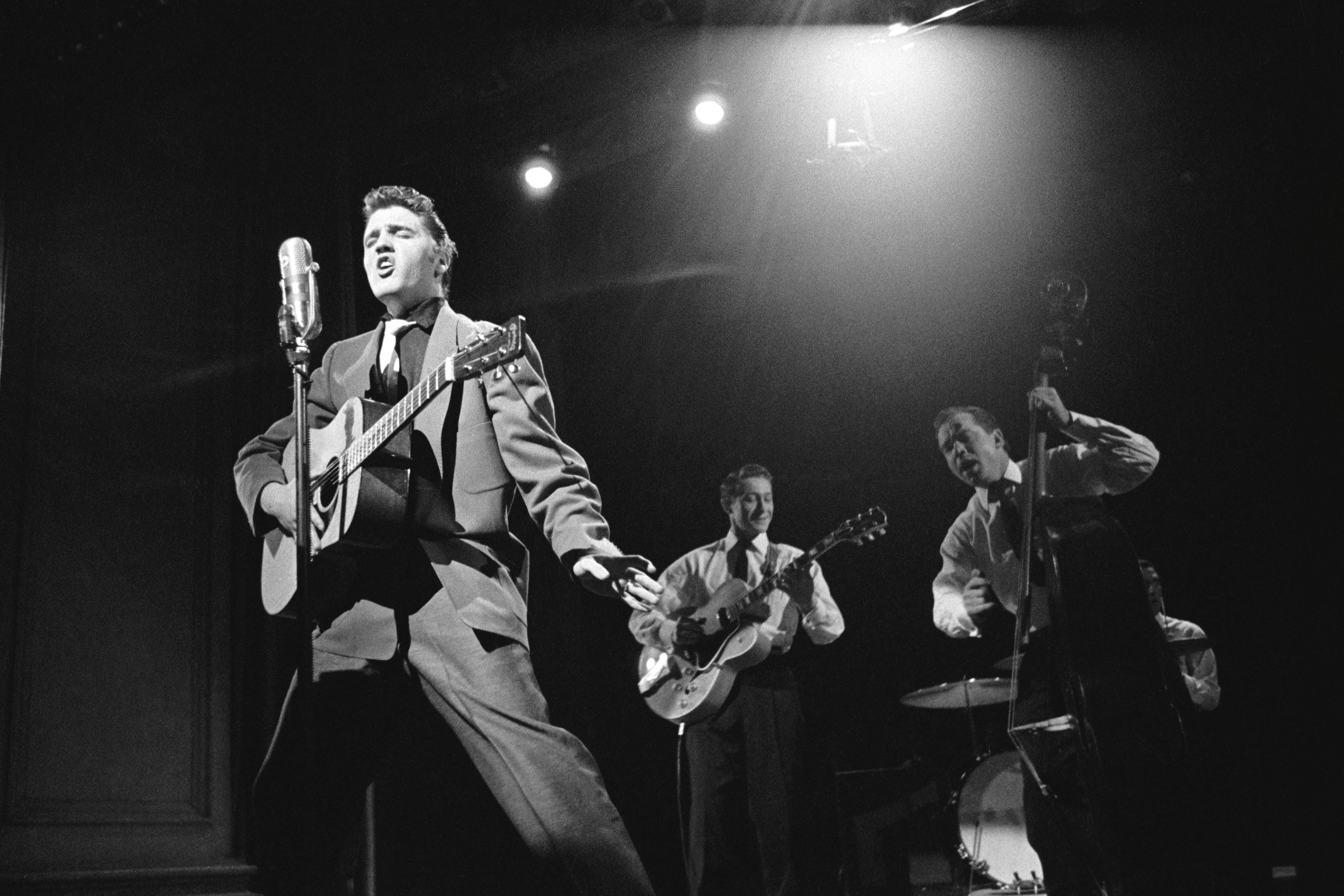
Presley performing with Scotty Moore and Bill Black in 1956

In November 1954, Presley performed on Louisiana Hayride—the Opry's chief, and more adventurous, rival. The show aired on 198 radio stations in 28 states. His nervous first set drew a muted reaction. A more composed and energetic second set inspired an enthusiastic response. Soon after the show, the Hayride engaged Presley for a year's worth of Saturday-night appearances. Trading in his old guitar for $8, he purchased a Martin instrument for $175 (equivalent to $2,100 in 2025) and his trio began playing in new locales, including Houston, Texas, and Texarkana, Arkansas. Presley made his first television appearance on the KSLA-TV broadcast of Louisiana Hayride. Soon after, he failed an audition for Arthur Godfrey's Talent Scouts on the CBS television network. By early 1955, Presley's regular Hayride appearances, constant touring, and well-received record releases had made him a regional star.

In January, Neal signed a formal management contract with Presley and brought him to the attention of Colonel Tom Parker, whom he considered the best promoter in the music business. Having successfully managed the top country star Eddy Arnold, Parker was working with the new number-one country singer, Hank Snow. Parker booked Presley on Snow's February tour.

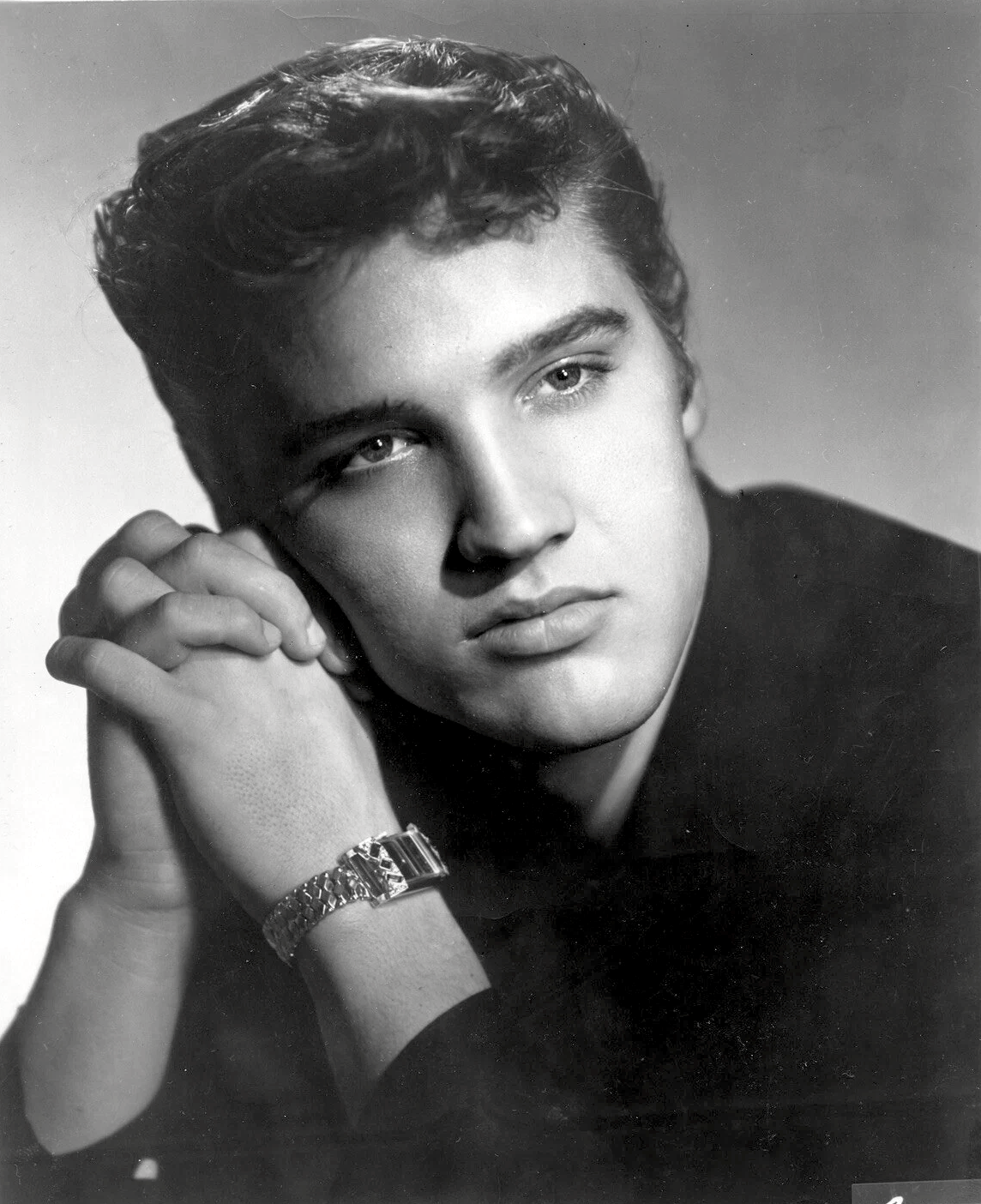
Presley in a 1955 promotional photograph

By August, Sun had released 10 sides credited to "Elvis Presley, Scotty and Bill"; the latest recordings included a drummer. Some of the songs, like "That's All Right", were in what one Memphis journalist described as the "R&B idiom of negro field jazz"; others, like "Blue Moon of Kentucky", were "more in the country field", "but there was a curious blending of the two different musics in both". This blend of styles made it difficult for Presley's music to find radio airplay. According to Neal, many country-music disc jockeys would not play it because Presley sounded too much like a black artist and none of the R&B stations would touch him because "he sounded too much like a hillbilly." The blend came to be known as "rockabilly". At the time, Presley was billed as "The King of Western Bop", "The Hillbilly Cat", and "The Memphis Flash".

Presley renewed Neal's management contract in August 1955, simultaneously appointing Parker as his special adviser. The group maintained an extensive touring schedule. Neal recalled, "It was almost frightening, the reaction that came to Elvis from the teenaged boys. So many of them, through some sort of jealousy, would practically hate him. There were occasions in some towns in Texas when we'd have to be sure to have a police guard because somebody'd always try to take a crack at him." The trio became a quartet when Hayride drummer Fontana joined as a full member. In mid-October, they played a few shows in support of Bill Haley, whose "Rock Around the Clock" track had been a number-one hit the previous year. Haley observed that Presley had a natural feel for rhythm, and advised him to sing fewer ballads.

At the Country Disc Jockey Convention in early November, Presley was voted the year's most promising male artist. After three major labels made offers of up to $25,000, Parker and Phillips struck a deal with RCA Victor on November 21 to acquire Presley's Sun contract for an unprecedented $40,000. (Note: Of the $40,000, $5,000 covered back royalties owed by Sun.) Presley, aged 20, was legally still a minor, so his father signed the contract. Parker arranged with the owners of Hill & Range Publishing, Jean and Julian Aberbach, to create two entities, Elvis Presley Music and Gladys Music, to handle all the new material recorded by Presley. Songwriters were obliged to forgo one-third of their customary royalties in exchange for having Presley perform their compositions. (Note: In 1956–57, Presley was also credited as a co-writer on several songs where he had no hand in the writing process: "Heartbreak Hotel"; "Don't Be Cruel"; all four songs from his first film, including the title track, "Love Me Tender"; "Paralyzed"; and "All Shook Up". (Parker failed to register Presley with such musical licensing firms as ASCAP and its rival BMI, which eventually denied Presley annuity from songwriter's royalties.) Presley received credit on two other songs to which he did contribute: he provided the title for "That's Someone You Never Forget" (1961), written by his friend and former Humes schoolmate Red West; they collaborated with another friend, guitarist Charlie Hodge, on "You'll Be Gone" (1962).) By December, RCA had begun to heavily promote its new singer, and before month's end had reissued many of his Sun recordings.

=== 1956–1958: Commercial breakout and controversy ===
==== First national TV appearances and debut album ====
The "iconic cover" of Presley's 1956 debut album, an image crucial in codifying the guitar as the defining instrument of rock and roll

On January 10, 1956, Presley made his first recordings for RCA Victor in Nashville. Extending his by-now customary backup of Moore, Black, Fontana, and Hayride pianist Floyd Cramer—who had been performing at live club dates with Presley—RCA Victor enlisted guitarist Chet Atkins and three background singers, including Gordon Stoker of the popular Jordanaires quartet. The session produced the moody "Heartbreak Hotel", released as a single on January 27. Parker brought Presley to national television, booking him on CBS' Stage Show for six appearances over two months. The program, produced in New York City, was hosted on alternate weeks by big band leaders and brothers Tommy and Jimmy Dorsey. After his first appearance on January 28, Presley stayed in town to record at RCA Victor's New York studio. The sessions yielded eight songs, including a cover of Carl Perkins' rockabilly anthem "Blue Suede Shoes". In February, Presley's "I Forgot to Remember to Forget", a Sun recording released the previous August, reached the top of the Billboard country chart. Neal's contract was terminated and Parker became Presley's manager.

RCA Victor released Presley's self-titled debut album on March 23. Joined by five previously unreleased Sun recordings, its seven recently recorded tracks included two country songs, a bouncy pop tune, and what would centrally define the evolving sound of rock and roll: "Blue Suede Shoes"—"an improvement over Perkins' in almost every way", according to critic Robert Hilburn—and three R&B numbers that had been part of Presley's stage repertoire, covers of Little Richard, Ray Charles, and The Drifters. As described by Hilburn, these

were the most revealing of all. Unlike many white artists ... who watered down the gritty edges of the original R&B versions of songs in the '50s, Presley reshaped them. He not only injected the tunes with his own vocal character but also made guitar, not piano, the lead instrument in all three cases.

It became the first rock and roll album to top the Billboard chart, a position it held for ten weeks. While Presley was not an innovative guitarist like Moore or contemporary African American rockers Bo Diddley and Chuck Berry, cultural historian Gilbert B. Rodman argued that the album's cover image, "of Elvis having the time of his life on stage with a guitar in his hands played a crucial role in positioning the guitar ... as the instrument that best captured the style and spirit of this new music."

==== Milton Berle Show and "Hound Dog" ====
On April 3, Presley made the first of two appearances on NBC's The Milton Berle Show. His performance, on the deck of the USS Hancock in San Diego, California, prompted cheers and screams from an audience of sailors and their dates. A few days later, Presley and his band were flying to Nashville, Tennessee, for a recording session when an engine died and the plane almost went down over Arkansas. Twelve weeks after its original release, "Heartbreak Hotel" became Presley's first number-one pop hit. In late April, Presley began a two-week residency at the New Frontier Hotel and Casino on the Las Vegas Strip. The shows were poorly received by the conservative, middle-aged hotel guests, "like a jug of corn liquor at a champagne party", a Newsweek critic wrote. Amid his Vegas tenure, Presley, who had acting ambitions, signed a seven-year contract with Paramount Pictures. He began a tour of the Midwest in mid-May, covering 15 cities in as many days. He had attended several shows by Freddie Bell and the Bellboys in Vegas and was struck by their cover of "Hound Dog", a hit in 1953 for blues singer Big Mama Thornton by songwriters Jerry Leiber and Mike Stoller. It became his new closing number.

After a show in La Crosse, Wisconsin, an urgent message on the letterhead of the local Catholic diocese's newspaper was sent to FBI director J. Edgar Hoover. It warned that

Presley is a definite danger to the security of the United States. ... [His] actions and motions were such as to rouse the sexual passions of teenaged youth. ... After the show, more than 1,000 teenagers tried to gang into Presley's room at the auditorium. ... Indications of the harm Presley did just in La Crosse were the two high school girls ... whose abdomen and thigh had Presley's autograph.

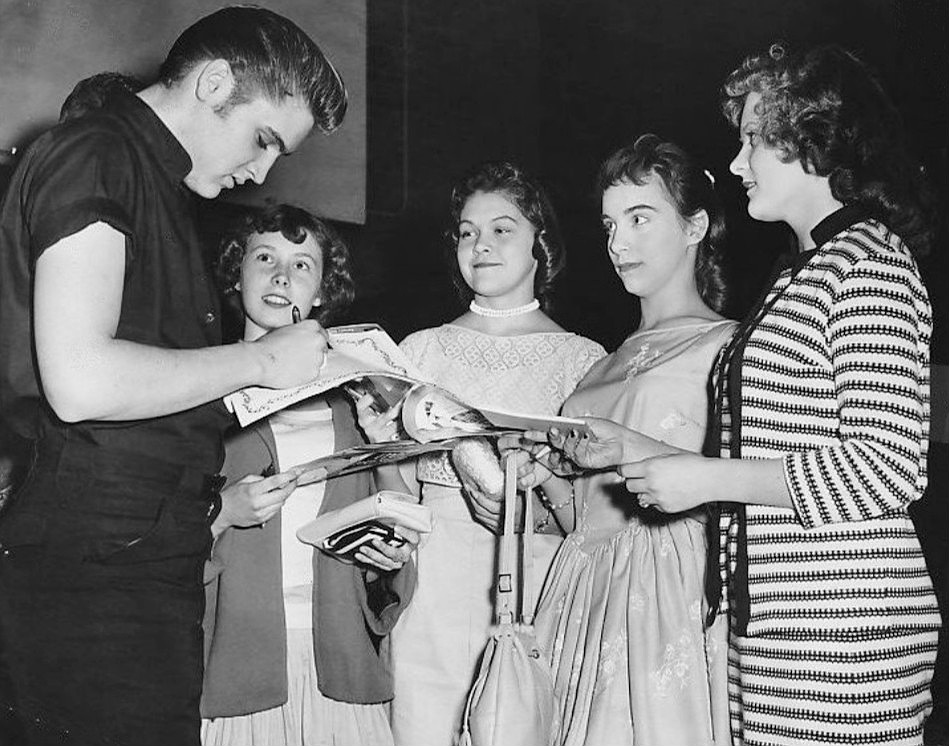
Presley signing autographs in Minneapolis in 1956

Presley's second Milton Berle Show appearance came on June 5 at NBC's Hollywood studio, amid another hectic tour. Milton Berle persuaded Presley to leave his guitar backstage. During the performance, Presley abruptly halted an up-tempo rendition of "Hound Dog" and launched into a slow, grinding version accentuated with exaggerated body movements. His gyrations created a storm of controversy. Jack Gould of The New York Times wrote,

Mr. Presley has no discernible singing ability. ... His phrasing, if it can be called that, consists of the stereotyped variations that go with a beginner's aria in a bathtub. ... His one specialty is an accented movement of the body ... primarily identified with the repertoire of the blond bombshells of the burlesque runway.

Ben Gross of the New York Daily News opined that popular music "has reached its lowest depths in the 'grunt and groin' antics of one Elvis Presley. ... Elvis, who rotates his pelvis ... gave an exhibition that was suggestive and vulgar, tinged with the kind of animalism that should be confined to dives and bordellos". Ed Sullivan, whose variety show was the nation's most popular, declared Presley "unfit for family viewing". To Presley's displeasure, he soon found himself being referred to as "Elvis the Pelvis", which he called "childish".

==== Steve Allen Show and first Sullivan appearance ====
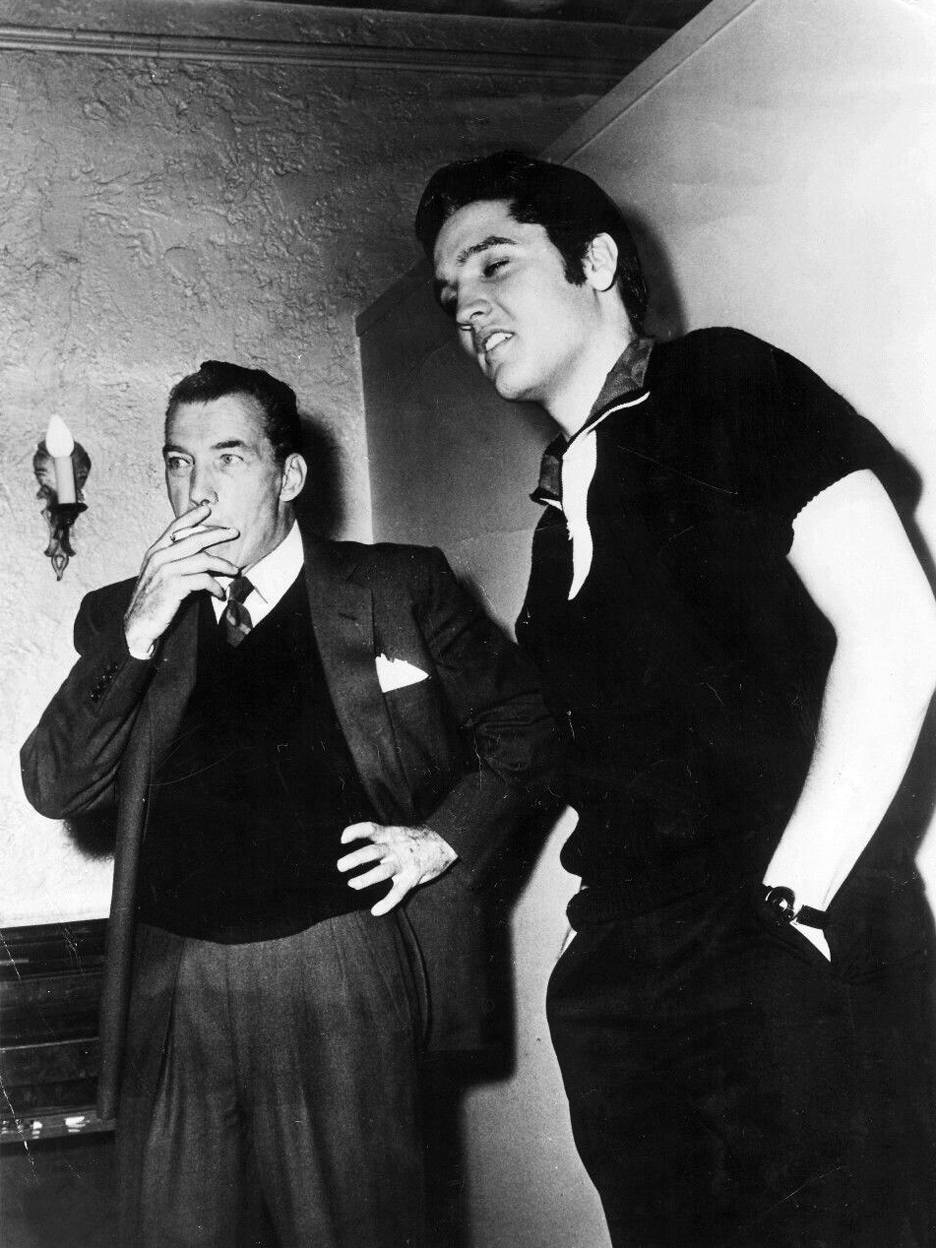
With Ed Sullivan during a press conference prior to his appearance on the program that evening, Sunday, October 26, 1956

The Berle shows drew such high ratings and notoriety that Presley was booked for a July 1 appearance on NBC's The Steve Allen Show in New York. Allen, who was no fan of rock and roll, introduced a "new Elvis" wearing a tuxedo with a light blue bow tie. After performing his current single, "I Want You, I Need You, I Love You", Presley sang "Hound Dog" to a Basset Hound Allen had rolled out, wearing a top hat and bow tie. As described by television historian Jake Austen, "Allen thought Presley was talentless and absurd ... [he] set things up so that Presley would show his contrition". Allen later wrote that he found Presley's "strange, gangly, country-boy charisma, his hard-to-define cuteness, and his charming eccentricity intriguing" and worked him into the "comedy fabric" of his program. Just before the final rehearsal for the show, Presley told a reporter, "I don't want to do anything to make people dislike me. I think TV is important so I'm going to go along, but I won't be able to give the kind of show I do in a personal appearance." Presley would refer back to the Allen show as the most ridiculous performance of his career. Later that night, he was interviewed on local New York TV's Hy Gardner Calling, in a segment that aired in August. Pressed on whether he had learned anything from media criticism, Presley responded, "No, I haven't ... I don't see how any type of music would have any bad influence on people when it's only music ... how would rock 'n' roll music make anyone rebel against their parents?"

The next day, Presley recorded "Hound Dog", "Don't Be Cruel" and "Any Way You Want Me". A few days later, Presley made a benefit concert appearance at Russwood Park in Memphis, where he promised the hometown fans, "You know, those people in New York are not gonna change me none. I'm gonna show you what the real Elvis is like tonight." In August, a judge in Jacksonville, Florida, ordered Presley to tame his act. Throughout the following performances there, he largely kept still, except for wiggling his finger suggestively in mockery of the order. The single pairing "Don't Be Cruel" with "Hound Dog" ruled the top of the charts for eleven weeks—a mark that would not be surpassed for 36 years. Recording sessions for Presley's second album took place in Hollywood in early September. Among others, Leiber and Stoller, the writers of "Hound Dog", were again tapped by the singer for his cover of "Love Me".

Allen's Sunday evening show with Presley had beaten The Ed Sullivan Show in the ratings. Sullivan booked Presley for three appearances for an unprecedented $50,000. The first, on September 9, 1956, was seen by approximately 60 million viewers—a record 82.6 percent of the television audience. Actor Charles Laughton hosted the show, filling in while Sullivan was recovering from a car accident. According to legend, Presley was shot only from the waist up. In fact, Presley was shown head-to-toe. Presley's performance of his forthcoming single, the ballad "Love Me Tender", prompted a record-shattering million advance orders. More than any other single event, it was his first appearance on The Ed Sullivan Show that made Presley a national celebrity.

Accompanying Presley's rise to fame, a cultural shift was taking place that he both helped inspire and came to symbolize. The historian Marty Jezer wrote that Presley began the "biggest pop craze" since Glenn Miller and Frank Sinatra and brought rock and roll to mainstream culture:

As Presley set the artistic pace, other artists followed. ... Presley, more than anyone else, gave the young a belief in themselves as a distinct and somehow unified generation—the first in America ever to feel the power of an integrated youth culture.

==== Crazed crowds and film debut ====
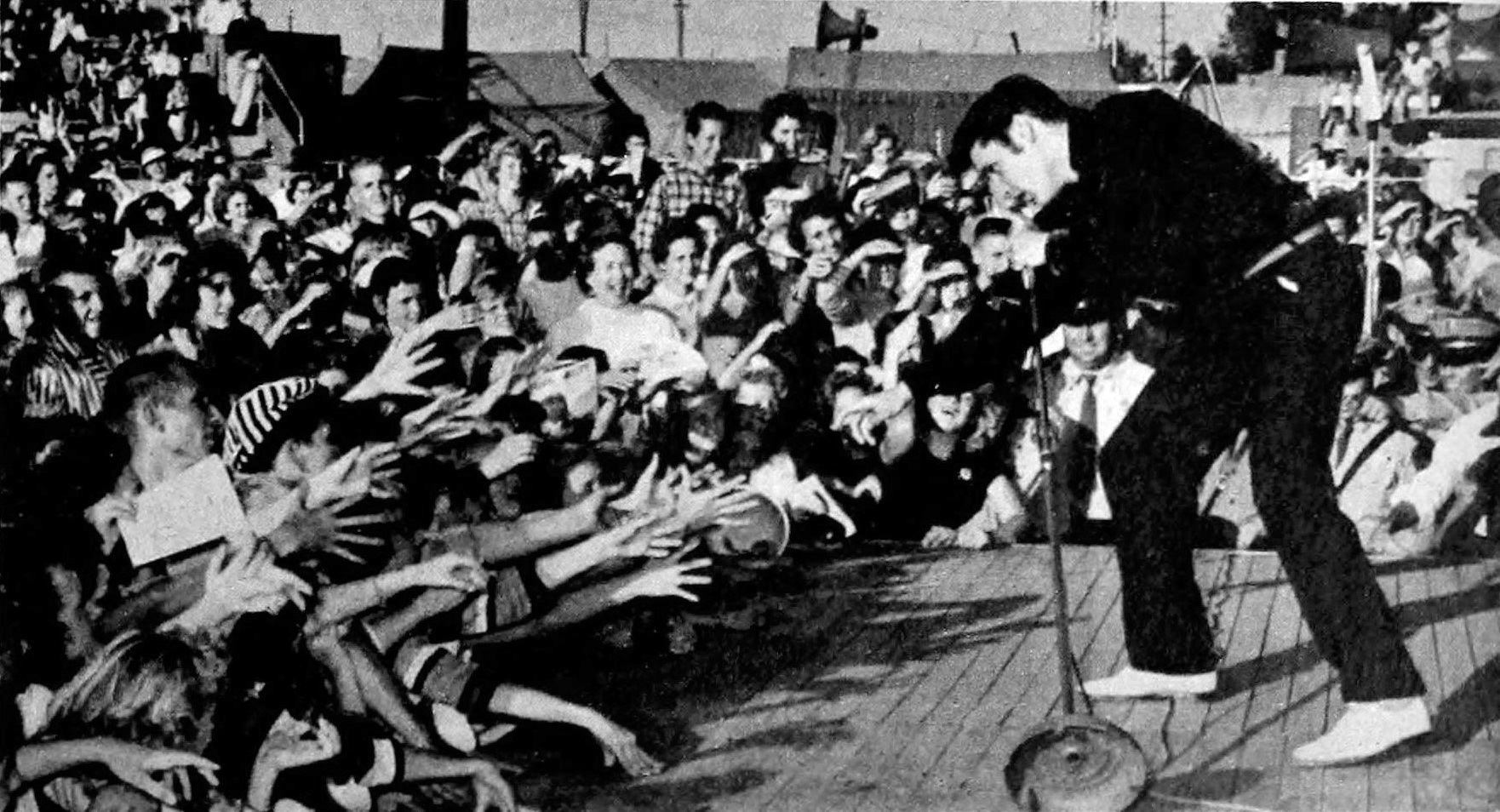
Presley performing at the Fairgrounds in Tupelo, Mississippi on September 26, 1956

The audience response at Presley's live shows became increasingly fevered. Guitarist Moore recalled how a set would conclude. "He'd start out, 'You ain't nothin' but a Hound Dog,' and they'd just go to pieces. They'd always react the same way. There'd be a riot every time." At the two concerts he performed in September at the Mississippi–Alabama Fair and Dairy Show, fifty National Guardsmen were added to the police detail to prevent a ruckus. Elvis, Presley's second RCA Victor album, was released in October and quickly rose to number one. The album includes "Old Shep", which he sang live over WELO Radio as part of a talent show the Fair held in October 1945. It also marked the first time Elvis played piano on an RCA Victor session. According to Guralnick, "the halting chords and the somewhat stumbling rhythm" showed "the unmistakable emotion and the equally unmistakable valuing of emotion over technique." Assessing the musical and cultural impact of Presley's recordings from "That's All Right" through Elvis, rock critic Dave Marsh wrote that "these records, more than any others, contain the seeds of what rock & roll was, has been and most likely what it may foreseeably become."

"We're gonna do a sad song ..."
Presley's definition of rock and roll included a sense of humor—here, during his second Sullivan appearance, he introduces one of his signature numbers.

Presley returned to The Ed Sullivan Show, hosted this time by its namesake, on October 28. After the performance, crowds in Nashville and St. Louis burned him in effigy. His first motion picture, Love Me Tender, was released on November 21. Though he was not top-billed, the film's original title—The Reno Brothers—was changed to capitalize on his latest number-one record: "Love Me Tender" had hit the top of the charts earlier that month. To further take advantage of Presley's popularity, four musical numbers were added to what was originally a straight acting role. The film was panned by critics but did very well at the box office. Presley received top billing on every subsequent film he made.

On December 4, Presley paid a visit to Sun Records and ended up jamming with Carl Perkins, Jerry Lee Lewis, and Perkins' rhythm section. Though owner and producer Phillips could not release any Presley material, he made sure that the session was captured on tape anyway. Sun artist Johnny Cash was briefly there as well, and posed for photos, but left before anything was caught on tape. The results became known as the "Million Dollar Quartet" recordings and remained a secret for decades, until a bootleg of a portion of the music surfaced in 1980. In 2006 RCA issued a virtually complete disc of the event, in best-ever quality. The year ended with a front-page story in The Wall Street Journal reporting that Presley merchandise had brought in $22 million on top of his record sales and Billboard's own declaration that he had placed more songs in the top 100 than any other artist since records were first charted. In his first full year at RCA Victor, then the record industry's largest company, Presley had accounted for over fifty percent of the label's singles sales.

==== Leiber and Stoller collaboration and draft notice ====
Presley made his third and final Ed Sullivan Show appearance on January 6, 1957—on this occasion indeed shot only down to the waist. Some commentators have claimed that Parker orchestrated an appearance of censorship to generate publicity. In any event, as critic Greil Marcus describes, Presley "did not tie himself down. Leaving behind the bland clothes he had worn on the first two shows, he stepped out in the outlandish costume of a pasha, if not a harem girl. From the make-up over his eyes, the hair falling in his face, the overwhelmingly sexual cast of his mouth, he was playing Rudolph Valentino in The Sheik, with all stops out." To close, displaying his range and defying Sullivan's wishes, Presley sang a gentle black spiritual, "Peace in the Valley". At the end of the show, Sullivan declared Presley "a real decent, fine boy". Two days later, the Memphis draft board announced that Presley would be classified 1-A and would probably be drafted sometime that year.

Each of the three Presley singles released in the first half of 1957 went to number one: "Too Much", "All Shook Up", and "(Let Me Be Your) Teddy Bear". Already an international star, he was attracting fans even where his music was not officially released: The New York Times reported that pressings of his music on discarded X-ray plates were commanding high prices in Leningrad. Presley purchased his 18-room mansion, Graceland, on March 19, 1957. Before the purchase, Elvis recorded Loving You—the soundtrack to his second film, which was released in July. It was his third straight number-one album. The title track was written by Leiber and Stoller, who were then retained to write four of the six songs recorded at the sessions for Jailhouse Rock, Presley's next film. The songwriting team effectively produced the Jailhouse sessions and developed a close working relationship with Presley, who came to regard them as his "good-luck charm". "He was fast," said Leiber. "Any demo you gave him he knew by heart in ten minutes." The title track became another number-one hit, as was the Jailhouse Rock EP.

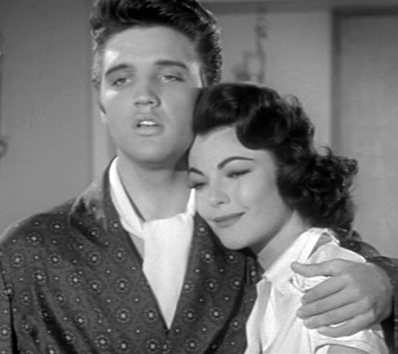
Presley and costar Judy Tyler in the trailer for Jailhouse Rock, released in October 1957

Presley undertook three brief tours during the year, continuing to generate a crazed audience response. A Detroit newspaper suggested that "the trouble with going to see Elvis Presley is that you're liable to get killed". Villanova students pelted the singer with eggs in Philadelphia, and in Vancouver the crowd rioted after the show ended, destroying the stage. Frank Sinatra, who had inspired the swooning and screaming of teenage girls in the 1940s, decried rock and roll as "brutal, ugly, degenerate, vicious. ... It fosters almost totally negative and destructive reactions in young people. It smells phoney and false. It is sung, played and written, for the most part, by cretinous goons. ... This rancid-smelling aphrodisiac I deplore." Asked for a response, Presley said:

I admire the man. He has a right to say what he wants to say. He is a great success and a fine actor, but I think he shouldn't have said it. ... This is a trend, just the same as he faced when he started years ago.

Leiber and Stoller were again in the studio for the recording of Elvis' Christmas Album. Toward the end of the session, they wrote a song on the spot at Presley's request: "Santa Claus Is Back in Town", an innuendo-laden blues. The holiday release stretched Presley's string of number-one albums to four and became the best-selling Christmas album ever in the United States, with eventual sales of over 20 million worldwide. After the session, Moore and Black—drawing only modest weekly salaries, sharing in none of Presley's massive financial success—resigned, though they were brought back on a per diem basis a few weeks later.

On December 20, Presley received his draft notice, though he was granted a deferment to finish the forthcoming film King Creole. A couple of weeks into the new year, "Don't", another Leiber and Stoller tune, became Presley's tenth number-one seller. Recording sessions for the King Creole soundtrack were held in Hollywood in mid-January 1958. Leiber and Stoller provided three songs, but it would be the last time Presley and the duo worked closely together. As Stoller later recalled, Presley's manager and entourage sought to wall him off. A brief soundtrack session on February 11 marked the final occasion on which Black was to perform with Presley.

=== 1958–1960: Military service and mother's death ===
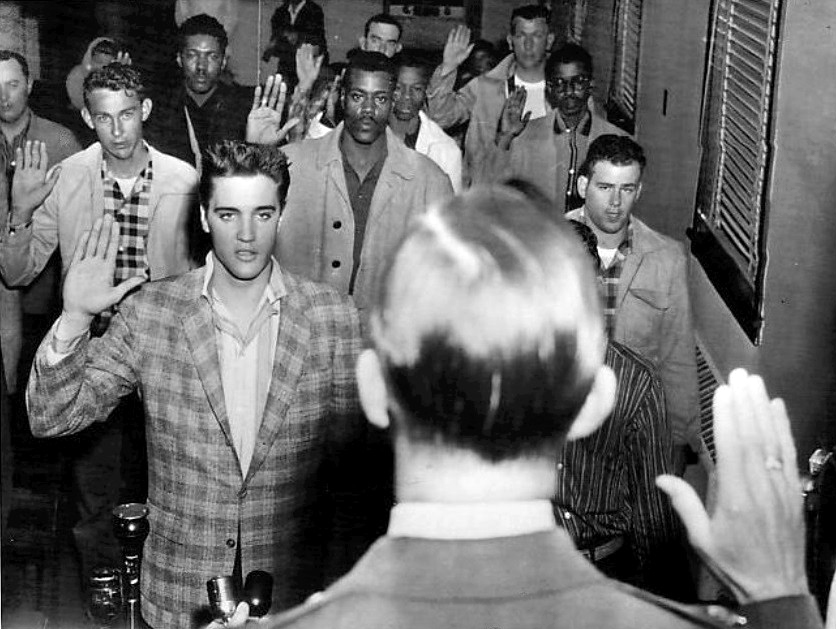
Presley being sworn into the Army on March 24, 1958, at Fort Chaffee

On March 24, 1958, Presley was drafted into the United States Army at Fort Chaffee in Arkansas. His arrival was a major media event. Hundreds of people descended on Presley as he stepped from the bus; photographers accompanied him into the installation. Presley announced that he was looking forward to his military service, saying that he did not want to be treated any differently from anyone else.

Between March 28 and September 17, 1958, Presley completed basic and advanced training at Fort Hood, Texas, where he was temporarily assigned to Company A, 2d Medium Tank Battalion, 37th Armor. During the two weeks' leave between his basic and advanced training in early June, he recorded five songs in Nashville. In early August, Presley's mother was diagnosed with hepatitis, and her condition rapidly worsened. Presley was granted emergency leave to visit her and arrived in Memphis on August 12. Two days later, she died of heart failure at age 46. Presley was devastated and never the same; their relationship had remained extremely close—even into his adulthood, they would use baby talk with each other and Presley would address her with pet names.

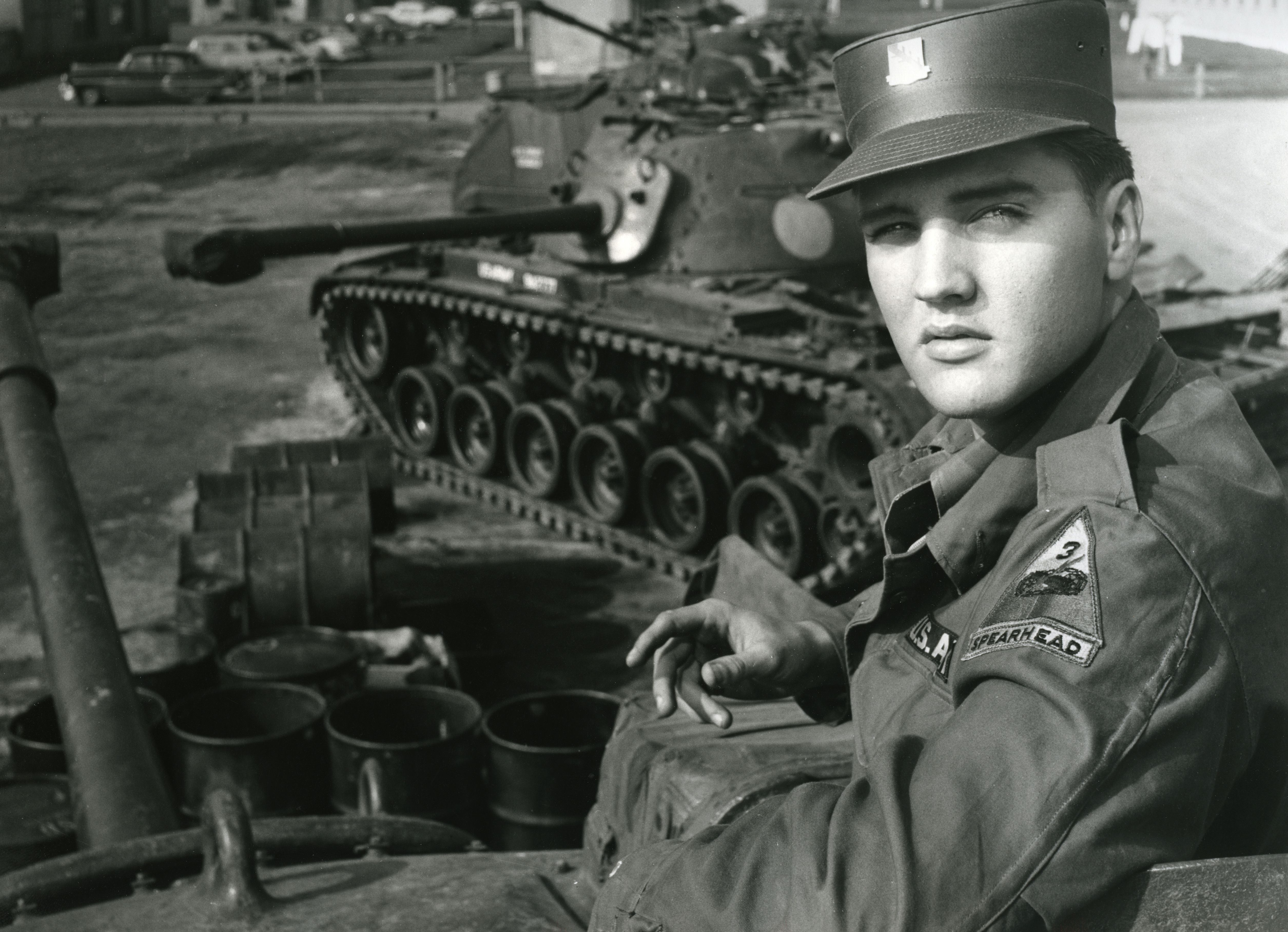
Presley, wearing the 3d Armored Division Shoulder Sleeve Insignia, poses atop a tank at Ray Barracks

On October 1, 1958, Presley was assigned to the 1st Medium Tank Battalion, 32d Armor, 3d Armored Division, at Ray Barracks, West Germany, where he served as an armor intelligence specialist. On November 27, he was promoted to private first class and on June 1, 1959, to specialist fourth class. While on maneuvers, Presley was introduced to amphetamines and became "practically evangelical about their benefits", not only for energy but for "strength" and weight loss. Karate became a lifelong interest: he studied with Jürgen Seydel, and later included it in his live performances. Fellow soldiers have attested to Presley's wish to be seen as an able, ordinary soldier despite his fame, and to his generosity. He donated his Army pay to charity, purchased television sets for the base, and bought an extra set of fatigues for everyone in his outfit. Presley was promoted to sergeant on February 11, 1960.

While in Bad Nauheim, Presley, aged 24, met 14-year-old Priscilla Beaulieu. They would marry after a seven-and-a-half-year courtship. In her autobiography, Priscilla said that Presley was concerned that his 24 months in the military would ruin his career. In Special Services, he would have been able to perform and remain in touch with the public, but Parker had convinced him that to gain popular respect, he should serve as a regular soldier. Media reports echoed Presley's concerns about his career, but RCA producer Steve Sholes and Freddy Bienstock of Hill and Range had carefully prepared: armed with a substantial amount of unreleased material, they kept up a regular stream of successful releases. Between his induction and discharge, Presley had ten top-40 hits, including "Wear My Ring Around Your Neck", the bestselling "Hard Headed Woman", and "One Night" in 1958, and "(Now and Then There's) A Fool Such as I" and the number-one "A Big Hunk o' Love" in 1959. RCA also generated four albums compiling previously issued material during this period, most successfully Elvis' Golden Records (1958), which hit number three on the LP chart.

=== 1960–1968: Focus on films ===
==== Elvis Is Back ====
"It's Now or Never"
Presley broke new stylistic ground and displayed his vocal range with this number-one hit. The quasi-operatic ballad ends with Presley "soaring up to an incredible top G sharp."

Presley returned to the US on March 2, 1960, and was honorably discharged three days later. The train that carried him from New Jersey to Tennessee was mobbed all the way, and Presley was called upon to appear at scheduled stops to please his fans. On the night of March 20, he entered RCA's Nashville studio to cut tracks for a new album along with a single, "Stuck on You", which was rushed into release and swiftly became a number-one hit. Another Nashville session two weeks later yielded a pair of bestselling singles, the ballads "It's Now or Never" and "Are You Lonesome Tonight?", along with the rest of Elvis Is Back! The album features several songs described by Greil Marcus as full of Chicago blues "menace, driven by Presley's own super-miked acoustic guitar, brilliant playing by Scotty Moore, and demonic sax work from Boots Randolph. Elvis' singing wasn't sexy, it was pornographic." The record "conjured up the vision of a performer who could be all things", according to music historian John Robertson: "a flirtatious teenage idol with a heart of gold; a tempestuous, dangerous lover; a gutbucket blues singer; a sophisticated nightclub entertainer; [a] raucous rocker". Released only days after recording was complete, it reached number two on the album chart.

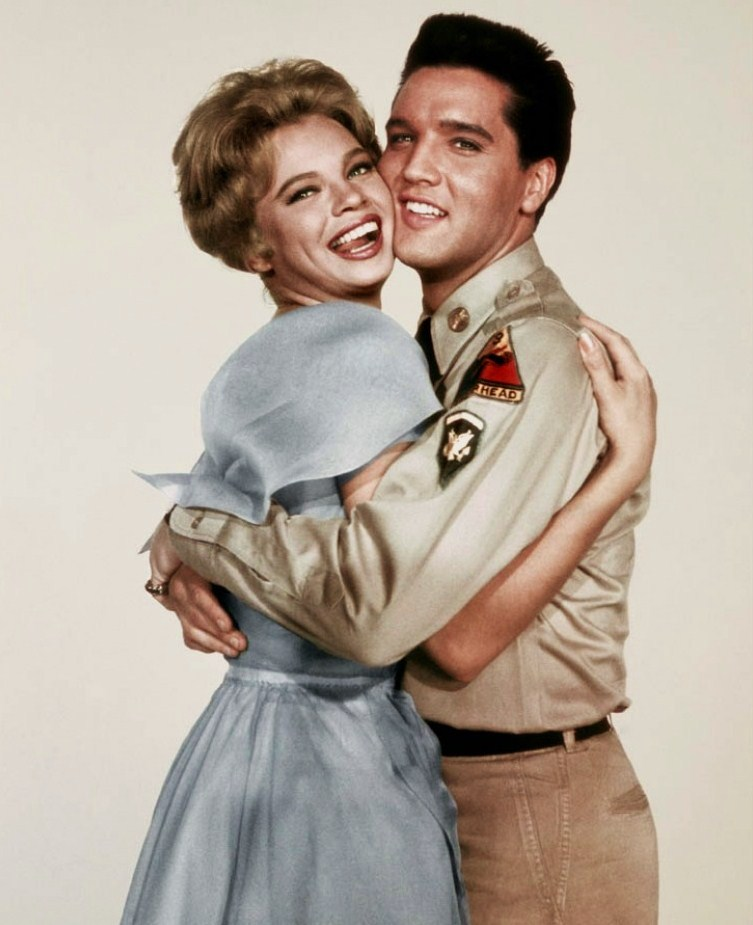
Presley with Juliet Prowse in G.I. Blues

On May 12, Presley reappeared on television as a guest on The Frank Sinatra Timex Special. Also known as Welcome Home Elvis, the show had been taped in late March, the only time all year Presley performed in front of an audience. Parker secured an unheard-of $125,000 for eight minutes of singing. The broadcast drew an enormous viewership.

G.I. Blues, the soundtrack to Presley's first film since his return, was a number-one album in October. His first LP of sacred material, His Hand in Mine, followed two months later; it reached number 13 on the US pop chart and number 3 in the United Kingdom, remarkable figures for a gospel album. In February 1961, Presley performed two shows in Memphis, for a benefit for 24 local charities. During a luncheon preceding the event, RCA Victor presented him with a plaque certifying worldwide sales of over 75 million records. A twelve-hour Nashville session in mid-March yielded nearly all of Presley's next studio album, Something for Everybody. According to John Robertson, it exemplifies the Nashville sound, the restrained, cosmopolitan style that defined country music in the 1960s. Presaging much of what was to come from Presley over the next half-decade, the album is largely "a pleasant, unthreatening pastiche of the music that had once been Elvis' birthright". It was his sixth number-one LP. Another benefit concert, for a Pearl Harbor memorial, was staged on March 25 in Hawaii. It was Presley's last public performance for seven years.

==== The "Presley pictures" ====
Parker had by now pushed Presley into a heavy filmmaking schedule, focused on formulaic, modestly budgeted musical comedies. Presley initially insisted on pursuing higher roles, but when two films in a more dramatic vein—Flaming Star (1960) and Wild in the Country (1961)—were less commercially successful, he reverted to the formula. Among the twenty-seven films he made during the 1960s, there were a few further exceptions. His films were almost universally panned; critic Andrew Caine dismissed them as a "pantheon of bad taste". Nonetheless, they were virtually all profitable. Hal Wallis, who produced nine, declared, "A Presley picture is the only sure thing in Hollywood."

Of Presley's films in the 1960s, 15 were accompanied by soundtrack albums and another five by soundtrack EPs. The films' rapid production and release schedules—Presley frequently starred in three a year—affected his music. According to Jerry Leiber, the soundtrack formula was already evident before Presley left for the Army: "three ballads, one medium-tempo [number], one up-tempo, and one break blues boogie". As the decade wore on, the quality of the soundtrack songs grew "progressively worse". Julie Parrish, who appeared in Paradise, Hawaiian Style (1966), says that Presley disliked many of the songs. The Jordanaires' Gordon Stoker describes how he would retreat from the studio microphone: "The material was so bad that he felt like he couldn't sing it." Most of the film albums featured a song or two from respected writers such as the team of Doc Pomus and Mort Shuman. But by and large, according to biographer Jerry Hopkins, the numbers seemed to be "written on order by men who never really understood Elvis or rock and roll".

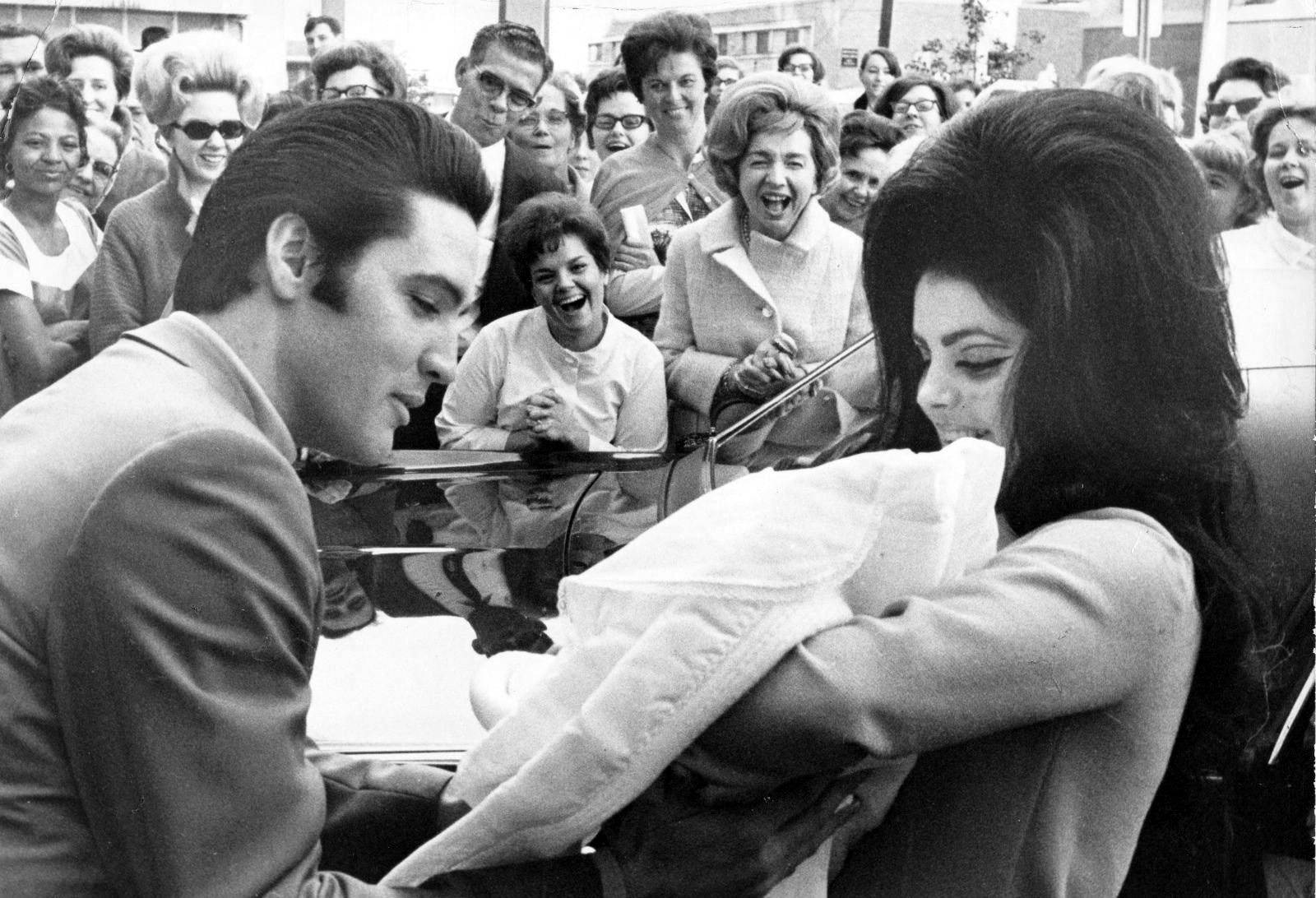
Presley and his wife, Priscilla Presley, holding their newborn daughter, Lisa Marie Presley, in 1968

In the first half of the decade, three of Presley's soundtrack albums were ranked number one on the pop charts, and a few of his most popular songs came from his films, such as "Can't Help Falling in Love" (1961) and "Return to Sender" (1962). From 1964 to 1968, Presley had one top-ten hit: "Crying in the Chapel" (1965), a gospel number recorded in 1960. As for non-film albums, between the June 1962 release of Pot Luck and the November 1968 release of the soundtrack to the television special that signaled his comeback, one LP of new material by Presley was issued: the gospel album How Great Thou Art (1967). It won him his first Grammy Award, for Best Sacred Performance. As Marsh described, Presley was "arguably the greatest white gospel singer of his time [and] really the last rock & roll artist to make gospel as vital a component of his musical personality as his secular songs".

Shortly before Christmas 1966, more than seven years since they first met, Presley proposed to Priscilla Beaulieu. They were married on May 1, 1967, in a brief ceremony in their suite at the Aladdin Hotel in Las Vegas.

=== 1968–1973: Comeback ===
==== Elvis: the '68 Comeback Special ====
The '68 Comeback Special produced "one of the most famous images" of Presley; taken on June 29, 1968, it was adapted for the cover of Rolling Stone in July 1969

Presley's only child, Lisa Marie, was born on February 1, 1968, during a period when he had grown deeply unhappy with his career. Of the eight Presley singles released between January 1967 and May 1968, only two charted in the top 40, none higher than number 28. Three of his six albums were in the top 40. His forthcoming soundtrack album, Speedway, would rank at number 82. Parker had already shifted his plans to television: he maneuvered a deal with NBC that committed the network to finance Presley's first TV special and a movie.

Recorded in late June in Burbank, California, the special, simply called Elvis, aired on December 3, 1968. Later known as the '68 Comeback Special, the show featured lavishly staged studio productions as well as songs performed with a band in front of a small audience—Presley's first live performances since 1961. The live segments saw Presley dressed in tight black leather, singing and playing guitar in an uninhibited style reminiscent of his early rock and roll days. Director and co-producer Steve Binder worked hard to produce a show that was far from the hour of Christmas songs Parker had originally planned. The show, NBC's highest-rated that season, captured 42 percent of the total viewing audience. Jon Landau of Eye magazine remarked:

There is something magical about watching a man who has lost himself find his way back home. He sang with the kind of power people no longer expect of rock 'n' roll singers. He moved his body with a lack of pretension and effort that must have made Jim Morrison green with envy.

Marsh calls the performance one of "emotional grandeur and historical resonance".

By January 1969, the single "If I Can Dream", written for the special, reached number 12. The soundtrack album rose into the top ten. According to friend Jerry Schilling, the special reminded Presley of what "he had not been able to do for years, being able to choose the people; being able to choose what songs and not being told what had to be on the soundtrack. ... He was out of prison, man." Binder said of Presley's reaction, "I played Elvis the 60-minute show, and he told me in the screening room, 'Steve, it's the greatest thing I've ever done in my life. I give you my word I will never sing a song I don't believe in.'"

==== From Elvis in Memphis and the International ====
"Power of My Love"
Beginning with his American Sound recordings, soul music became a central element in Presley's fusion of styles. Here, he revels in lyrics full of sexual innuendos.

Buoyed by the experience of the Comeback Special, Presley engaged in a prolific series of recording sessions at American Sound Studio, which led to the acclaimed From Elvis in Memphis. Released in June 1969, it was his first secular, non-soundtrack album from a dedicated period in the studio in eight years. As described by Marsh, it is "a masterpiece in which Presley immediately catches up with pop music trends that had seemed to pass him by during the movie years. He sings country songs, soul songs and rockers with real conviction, a stunning achievement." The album featured the hit single "In the Ghetto", issued in April, which reached number three on the pop chart—Presley's first non-gospel top ten hit since "Bossa Nova Baby" in 1963. Further hit singles were culled from the American Sound sessions: "Suspicious Minds", "Don't Cry Daddy", and "Kentucky Rain".

Presley was keen to resume regular live performing. After the success of the Comeback Special, offers came in from around the world. The London Palladium offered Parker US$28,000 (equivalent to $246,000 in 2025) for a one-week engagement. He responded, "That's fine for me, now how much can you get for Elvis?" In May, the brand-new International Hotel in Las Vegas, boasting the largest showroom in the city, booked Presley for fifty-seven shows over four weeks, beginning July 31. Moore, Fontana, and the Jordanaires declined to participate, afraid of losing the lucrative session work they had in Nashville. Presley assembled new, top-notch accompaniment, led by guitarist James Burton and including two gospel groups, The Imperials and Sweet Inspirations. Costume designer Bill Belew, responsible for the intense leather styling of the Comeback Special, created a new stage look for Presley, inspired by his passion for karate. Nonetheless, Presley was nervous: his only previous Las Vegas engagement, in 1956, had been dismal. Parker oversaw a major promotional push, and International Hotel owner Kirk Kerkorian arranged to send his own plane to New York to fly in rock journalists for the debut performance.

Presley took to the stage without introduction. The audience of 2,200, including many celebrities, gave him a standing ovation before he sang a note and another after his performance. A third followed his encore, "Can't Help Falling in Love" (which would be his closing number for much of his remaining life). At a press conference after the show, when a journalist referred to him as "The King", Presley gestured toward Fats Domino, who was taking in the scene. "No," Presley said, "that's the real king of rock and roll." The next day, Parker's negotiations with the hotel resulted in a five-year contract for Presley to play each February and August, at an annual salary of $1 million. Newsweek commented, "There are several unbelievable things about Elvis, but the most incredible is his staying power in a world where meteoric careers fade like shooting stars." Rolling Stone called Presley "supernatural, his own resurrection". In November, Presley's final non-concert film, Change of Habit, opened. The double album From Memphis to Vegas/From Vegas to Memphis came out the same month; the first LP consisted of live performances from the International, the second of more cuts from the American Sound sessions. "Suspicious Minds" reached the top of the charts—Presley's first US pop number-one in over seven years, and his last.

Cassandra Peterson, later television's Elvira, met Presley during this period in Las Vegas. She recalled of their encounter, "He was so anti-drug when I met him. I mentioned to him that I smoked marijuana, and he was just appalled." Presley also rarely drank—several of his family members had been alcoholics, a fate he intended to avoid.

==== Back on tour and meeting Nixon ====
Presley returned to the International early in 1970 for the first of the year's two-month-long engagements, performing two shows a night. Recordings from these shows were issued on the album On Stage. In late February, Presley performed six attendance-record–breaking shows at the Houston Astrodome. In April, the single "The Wonder of You" was issued—a number one hit in the UK, it topped the US adult contemporary chart as well. Metro-Goldwyn-Mayer (MGM) filmed rehearsal and concert footage at the International during August for the documentary Elvis: That's the Way It Is. Presley was performing in a jumpsuit, which would become a trademark of his live act. During this engagement, he was threatened with murder unless US$50,000 (equivalent to $415,000 in 2025) was paid. Presley had been the target of many threats since the 1950s, often without his knowledge. The FBI took the threat seriously and security was increased for the next two shows. Presley went onstage with a Derringer in his right boot and a .45-caliber pistol in his waistband, but the concerts succeeded without any incidents.

That's the Way It Is, produced to accompany the documentary and featuring both studio and live recordings, marked a stylistic shift. As music historian John Robertson noted,

The authority of Presley's singing helped disguise the fact that the album stepped decisively away from the American-roots inspiration of the Memphis sessions towards a more middle-of-the-road sound. With country put on the back burner, and soul and R&B left in Memphis, what was left was very classy, very clean white pop—perfect for the Las Vegas crowd, but a definite retrograde step for Elvis.

After the end of his International engagement on September 7, Presley embarked on a week-long concert tour, largely of the South, his first since 1958. Another week-long tour, of the West Coast, followed in November.

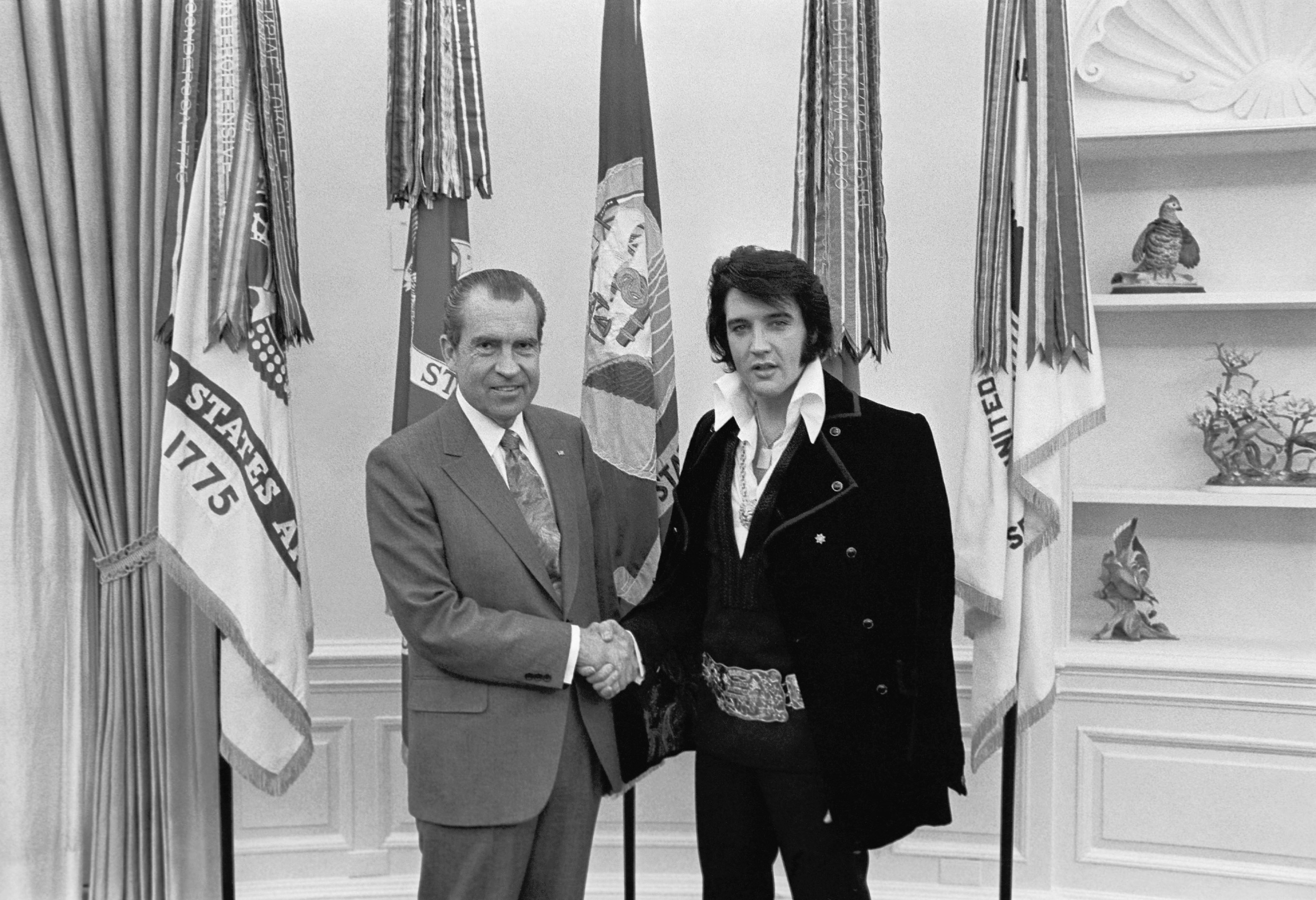
Presley meets US president Richard Nixon in the White House Oval Office, December 21, 1970.

On December 21, 1970, Presley engineered a meeting with US president Richard Nixon at the White House, where he explained how he believed he could reach out to the hippies to help combat the drug culture he and the president abhorred. He asked Nixon for a Bureau of Narcotics and Dangerous Drugs badge, to signify official sanction of his efforts. Nixon, who apparently found the encounter awkward, expressed a belief that Presley could send a positive message to young people and that it was, therefore, important that he "retain his credibility".

The US Junior Chamber of Commerce named Presley one of its annual Ten Most Outstanding Young Men of the Nation on January 16, 1971. Not long after, the City of Memphis named the stretch of Highway 51 South on which Graceland is located "Elvis Presley Boulevard". The same year, Presley became the first rock and roll singer to be awarded the Grammy Lifetime Achievement Award (then known as the Bing Crosby Award). Three new, non-film Presley studio albums were released in 1971. Best received by critics was Elvis Country, a concept record that focused on genre standards. The biggest seller was Elvis Sings The Wonderful World of Christmas. According to Greil Marcus,

In the midst of ten painfully genteel Christmas songs, every one sung with appalling sincerity and humility, one could find Elvis tom-catting his way through six blazing minutes of "Merry Christmas Baby", a raunchy old Charles Brown blues. [...] If [Presley's] sin was his lifelessness, it was his sinfulness that brought him to life.

==== Marriage breakdown and Aloha from Hawaii ====
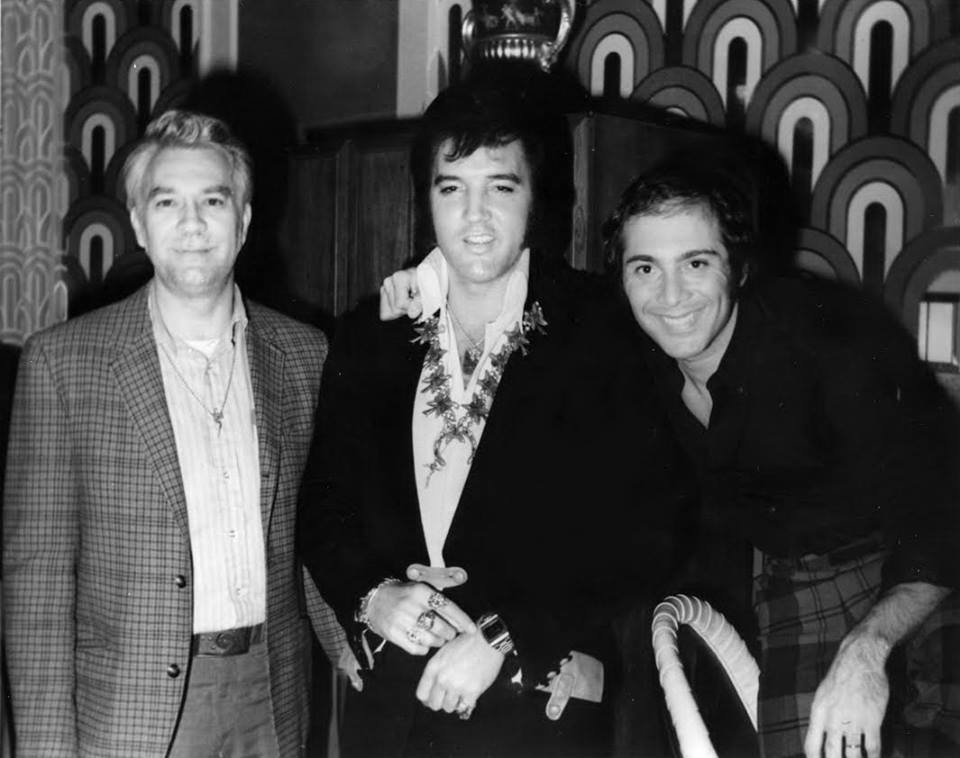
Presley (center) with friends Bill Porter (left) and Paul Anka (right) backstage at the Las Vegas Hilton on August 5, 1972

MGM filmed Presley in April 1972 for Elvis on Tour, which went on to win the Golden Globe Award for Best Documentary Film for that year's Golden Globe Awards. His gospel album He Touched Me, released that month, would earn him his second Grammy Award for Best Inspirational Performance. A fourteen-date tour commenced with an unprecedented four consecutive sold-out shows at New York's Madison Square Garden. The evening concert on July 10 was issued in LP form a week later. Elvis: As Recorded at Madison Square Garden became one of Presley's biggest-selling albums. After the tour, the single "Burning Love" was released—Presley's last top ten hit on the US pop chart. "The most exciting single Elvis has made since 'All Shook Up'", wrote rock critic Robert Christgau.

Presley and his wife had become increasingly distant, barely cohabiting. In 1971, an affair he had with Joyce Bova resulted—unbeknownst to him—in her pregnancy and an abortion. He often raised the possibility of Joyce moving into Graceland. Priscilla at that period of time was having an affair with her karate instructor. The Presleys officially separated on February 23, 1972. Five months later, Presley's new girlfriend, Linda Thompson, a songwriter and one-time Memphis beauty queen, moved in with him. Presley and his wife filed for divorce on August 18. According to Joe Moscheo of the Imperials, the failure of Presley's marriage "was a blow from which he never recovered". At a rare press conference that June, a reporter had asked Presley whether he was satisfied with his image. Presley replied, "Well, the image is one thing and the human being another ... it's very hard to live up to an image."

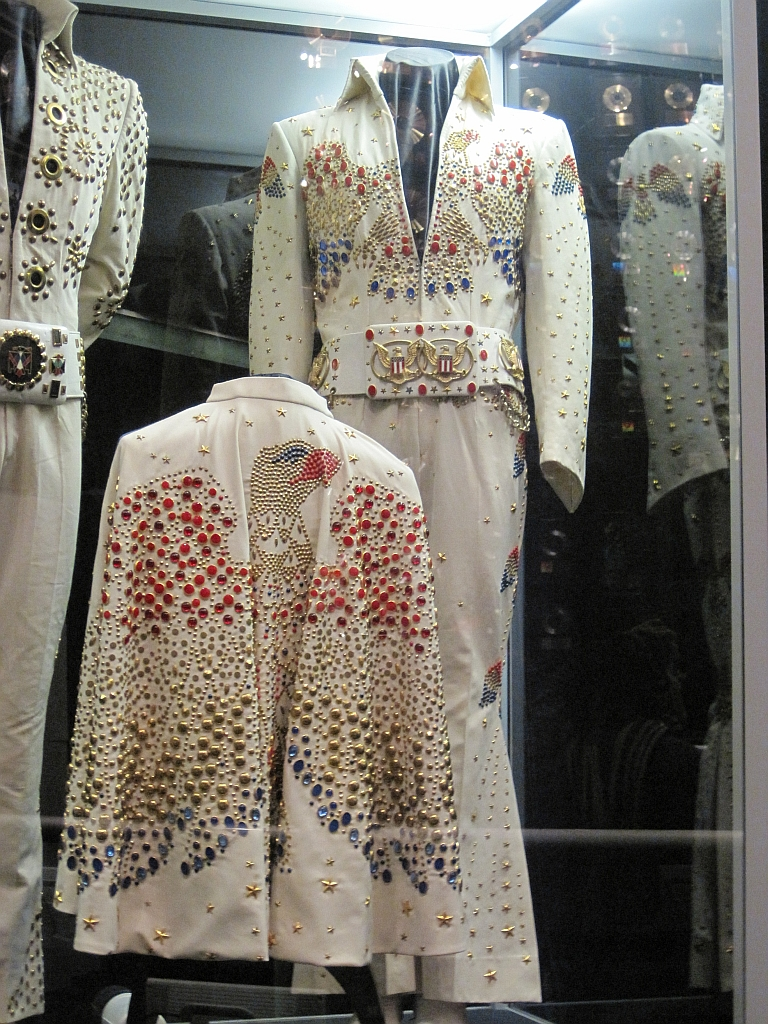
Presley came up with his outfit's eagle motif, as "something that would say 'America' to the world".

In January 1973, Presley performed two benefit concerts for the Kui Lee Cancer Fund in connection with a groundbreaking television special, Aloha from Hawaii, which would be the first concert by a solo artist to be aired globally. The first show served as a practice run and backup should technical problems affect the live broadcast two days later. On January 14, Aloha from Hawaii aired live via satellite to prime-time audiences in Japan, South Korea, Thailand, the Philippines, Australia, and New Zealand, as well as to US servicemen based across Southeast Asia. In Japan, where it capped a nationwide Elvis Presley Week, it smashed viewing records. The next night, it was simulcast to twenty-eight European countries, and in April an extended version aired in the US, receiving a fifty-seven percent share of the TV audience. Over time, Parker's claim that it was seen by one billion or more people would be broadly accepted, but that figure appeared to have been sheer invention. Presley's stage costume became the most recognized example of the elaborate concert garb with which his latter-day persona became closely associated. As described by Bobbie Ann Mason, "At the end of the show, when he spreads out his American Eagle cape, with the full stretched wings of the eagle studded on the back, he becomes a god figure." The accompanying double album, released in February, went to number one and eventually sold over five million copies in the US. It was Presley's last US number-one pop album during his lifetime.

At a midnight show that same month, four men rushed onto the stage in an apparent attack. Security personnel came to Presley's defense, and he ejected one invader from the stage himself. After the show, Presley became obsessed with the idea that the men had been sent by Mike Stone (Priscilla's karate instructor) to kill him. Though they were shown to have been only overexuberant fans, Presley raged, "There's too much pain in me ... Stone [must] die." His outbursts continued with such intensity that a physician was unable to calm him, despite administering large doses of medication. After another two full days of raging, Red West, his friend and bodyguard, felt compelled to get a price for a contract killing and was relieved when Presley decided, "Aw hell, let's just leave it for now. Maybe it's a bit heavy." In June, the press announced that Priscilla sued to set aside the default divorce settlement.

=== 1973–1977: Medical crises and last studio sessions ===
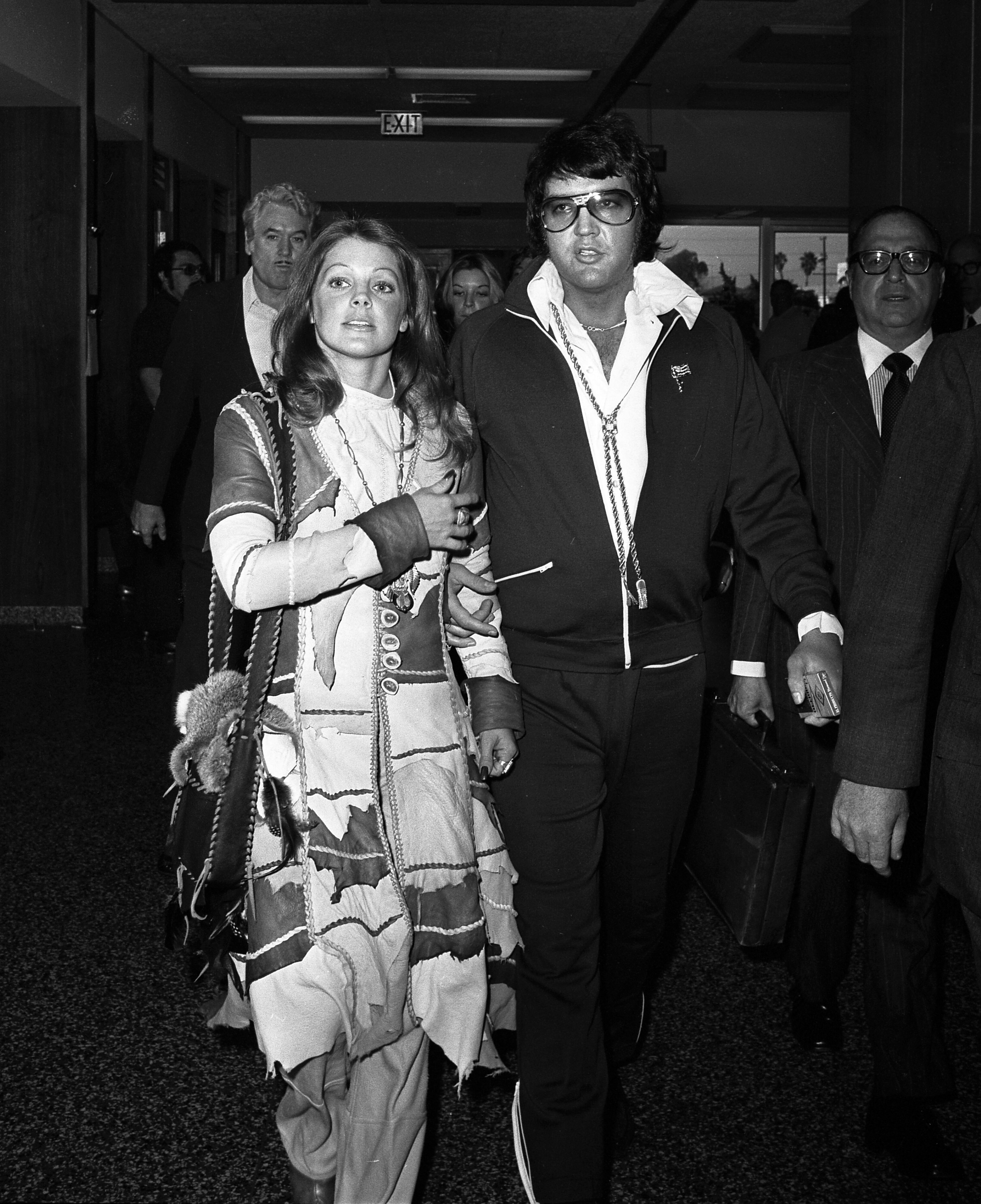
Elvis and Priscilla Presley after their divorce was finalized in 1973

Presley's divorce settlement was finalized on October 9, 1973. He and Priscilla would remain close friends until his death, even walking arm in arm while leaving the courtroom where they finalized their divorce. Priscilla recalled that they lived life together "like we were never divorced. Elvis and I still hugged each other, still had love. We would say, 'Mommy said this' and 'Daddy said that.' That helped Lisa to feel stable. There was never any arguing or bitterness." By this time, his health was in serious decline. Twice during the year he overdosed on barbiturates, spending three days in a coma in his hotel suite after the first incident. In late 1973, he was hospitalized from the effects of a pethidine addiction. According to his primary care physician, George C. Nichopoulos, Presley "felt that by getting drugs from a doctor, he wasn't the common everyday junkie getting something off the street". Since his comeback, he had staged more live shows with each passing year, and 1973 saw 168 concerts, his busiest schedule ever. Despite his failing health, he undertook another intensive touring schedule in 1974.

Presley's condition declined precipitously that September. Keyboardist Tony Brown remembered his arrival at a University of Maryland concert: "He fell out of the limousine, to his knees. People jumped to help, and he pushed them away like, 'Don't help me.' He walked on stage and held onto the mic for the first thirty minutes like it was a post. Everybody's looking at each other like, 'Is the tour gonna happen'?" Guitarist John Wilkinson recalled:

He was all gut. He was slurring. He was so fucked up. ... It was obvious he was drugged. It was obvious there was something terribly wrong with his body. It was so bad the words to the songs were barely intelligible. ... I remember crying. He could barely get through the introductions.

On July 13, 1976, Vernon Presley—who had become deeply involved in his son's financial affairs—had fired "Memphis Mafia" bodyguards Red West (Presley's friend since the 1950s), Sonny West, and David Hebler, citing the need to "cut back on expenses". Presley was in Palm Springs at the time, and some suggest the singer was too cowardly to face the three himself. Another associate of Presley's, John O'Grady, argued that the bodyguards were dropped because their rough treatment of fans had prompted too many lawsuits. Presley's stepbrother David Stanley has claimed that the bodyguards were fired because they were becoming more outspoken about Presley's drug dependency.

RCA began to grow anxious as his interest in the recording studio waned. After a session in December 1973 that produced eighteen songs, enough for almost two albums, Presley made no official studio recordings in 1974. Parker delivered RCA another concert record, Elvis Recorded Live on Stage in Memphis. Recorded on March 20, it included a version of "How Great Thou Art" that won Presley his third and final Grammy Award for Best Inspirational Performance. All three of his competitive Grammy wins – out of fourteen total nominations – were for gospel recordings. Presley returned to the recording studio in March 1975, but Parker's attempts to arrange another session toward the end of the year were unsuccessful. In 1976, RCA sent a mobile recording unit to Graceland that made possible two full-scale recording sessions, but the recording process had become a struggle for him.

"Hurt"
An R&B hit for Roy Hamilton in 1955 and a pop hit for blue-eyed soul singer Timi Yuro in 1961, Presley's deep soul version was picked up by country radio in 1976.

After Presley's relationship with Linda Thompson ended, he began dating Ginger Alden in November 1976, and proposed marriage two months later. Journalist Tony Scherman wrote that, by early 1977, "Presley had become a grotesque caricature of his sleek, energetic former self. Grossly overweight, his mind dulled by the pharmacopoeia he daily ingested, he was barely able to pull himself through his abbreviated concerts." According to Andy Greene of Rolling Stone, Presley's final performances were mostly "sad, sloppy affairs where a bloated, drugged Presley struggled to remember his lyrics and get through the night without collapsing ... Most everything from the final three years of his life is sad and hard to watch." In Alexandria, Louisiana, he was on stage for less than an hour and "was impossible to understand". On March 31, he canceled a performance in Baton Rouge, unable to get out of his hotel bed; four shows were rescheduled.

Despite his deteriorating health, Presley fulfilled most of his touring commitments. According to Guralnick, fans "were becoming increasingly voluble about their disappointment, but it all seemed to go right past Presley, whose world was now confined almost entirely to his room and his spiritualism books". Presley's cousin, Billy Smith, recalled how he would sit in his room and chat for hours, sometimes recounting favorite Monty Python sketches and his past escapades, but more often gripped by paranoid obsessions.

"Way Down", Presley's last single issued during his lifetime, was released on June 6, 1977. That month, CBS taped two concerts for a television special, Elvis in Concert, to be broadcast in October. In the first, shot in Omaha on June 19, Presley's voice, Guralnick writes, "is almost unrecognizable, a small, childlike instrument in which he talks more than sings most of the songs, casts about uncertainly for the melody in others, and is virtually unable to articulate or project". Two days later, in Rapid City, South Dakota, "he looked healthier, seemed to have lost a little weight, and sounded better, too", though, by the conclusion of the performance, his face was "framed in a helmet of blue-black hair from which sweat sheets down over pale, swollen cheeks". Presley's final concert was held in Indianapolis at Market Square Arena, on June 26, 1977.

The book Elvis: What Happened?, co-written by the three bodyguards fired a year earlier, was published on August 1. It was the first exposé to detail Presley's years of drug misuse. He was devastated by the book and tried unsuccessfully to halt its release by offering money to the publishers. By this point, he suffered from multiple ailments: glaucoma, high blood pressure, liver damage, and an enlarged colon, each aggravated—and possibly caused—by drug abuse. His last appearance in public occurred during the early morning hours of August 8, 1977, when he rented the entire Libertyland amusement park in Memphis for himself and about ten others.

== Death ==
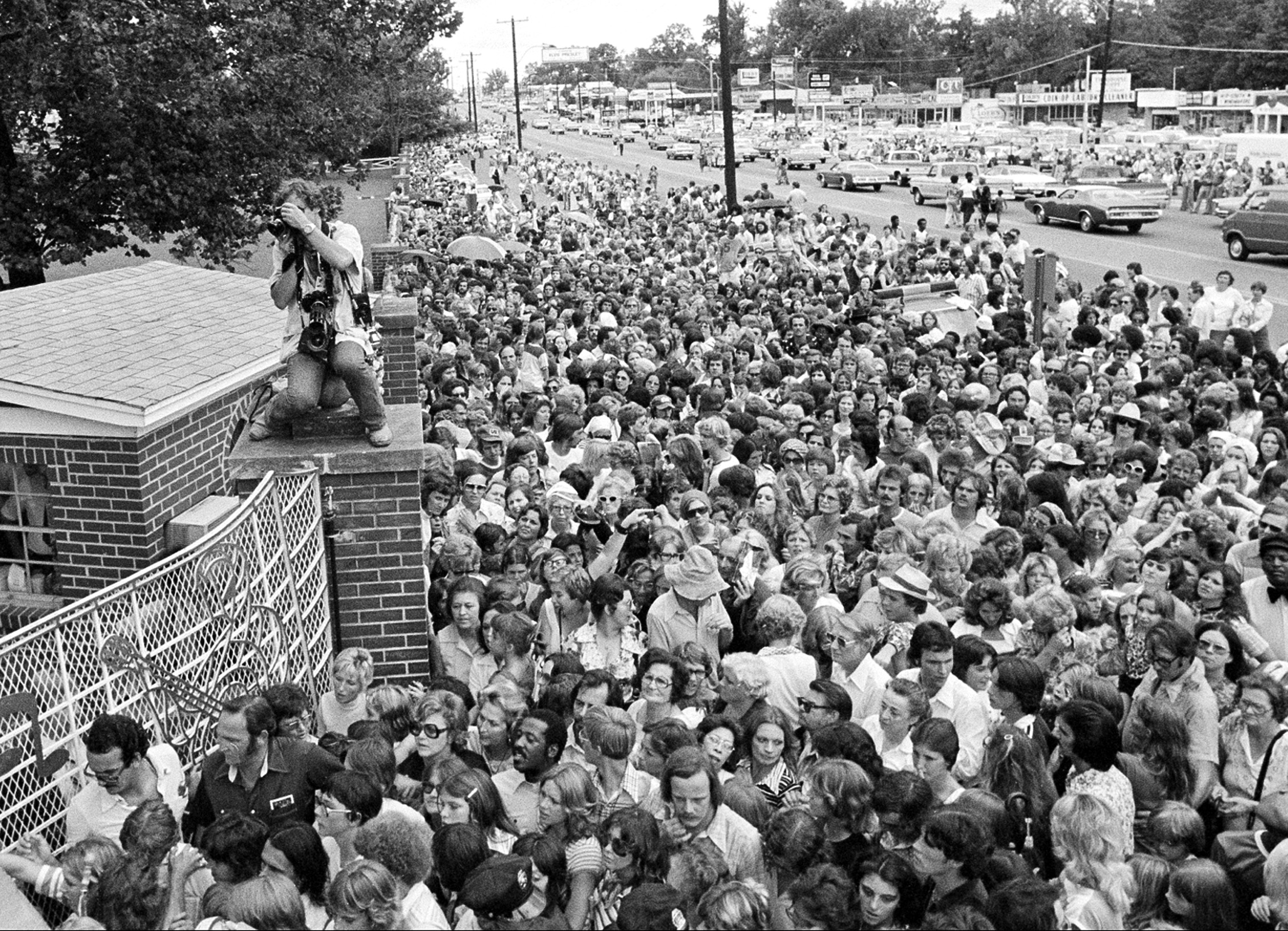
Fans gather outside Graceland to view Presley's body.

On August 16, 1977, Presley was scheduled for an evening flight from Memphis to Portland, Maine, to begin another tour. That afternoon, his fiancée, Ginger Alden, discovered him unresponsive on the bathroom floor of his Graceland mansion. Attempts to revive him failed, and he was pronounced dead at Baptist Memorial Hospital at 3:30 pm; he was 42.

President Jimmy Carter issued a statement that credited Presley with having "permanently changed the face of American popular culture". Thousands of people gathered outside Graceland to view the open casket. One of Presley's cousins, Billy Mann, accepted US$18,000 (equivalent to $96,000 in 2025) to secretly photograph the body; the picture appeared on the cover of the National Enquirer's biggest-selling issue ever. Alden struck a $105,000 (equivalent to $558,000 in 2025) deal with the Enquirer for her story, but settled for less when she broke her exclusivity agreement. Presley left her nothing in his will.

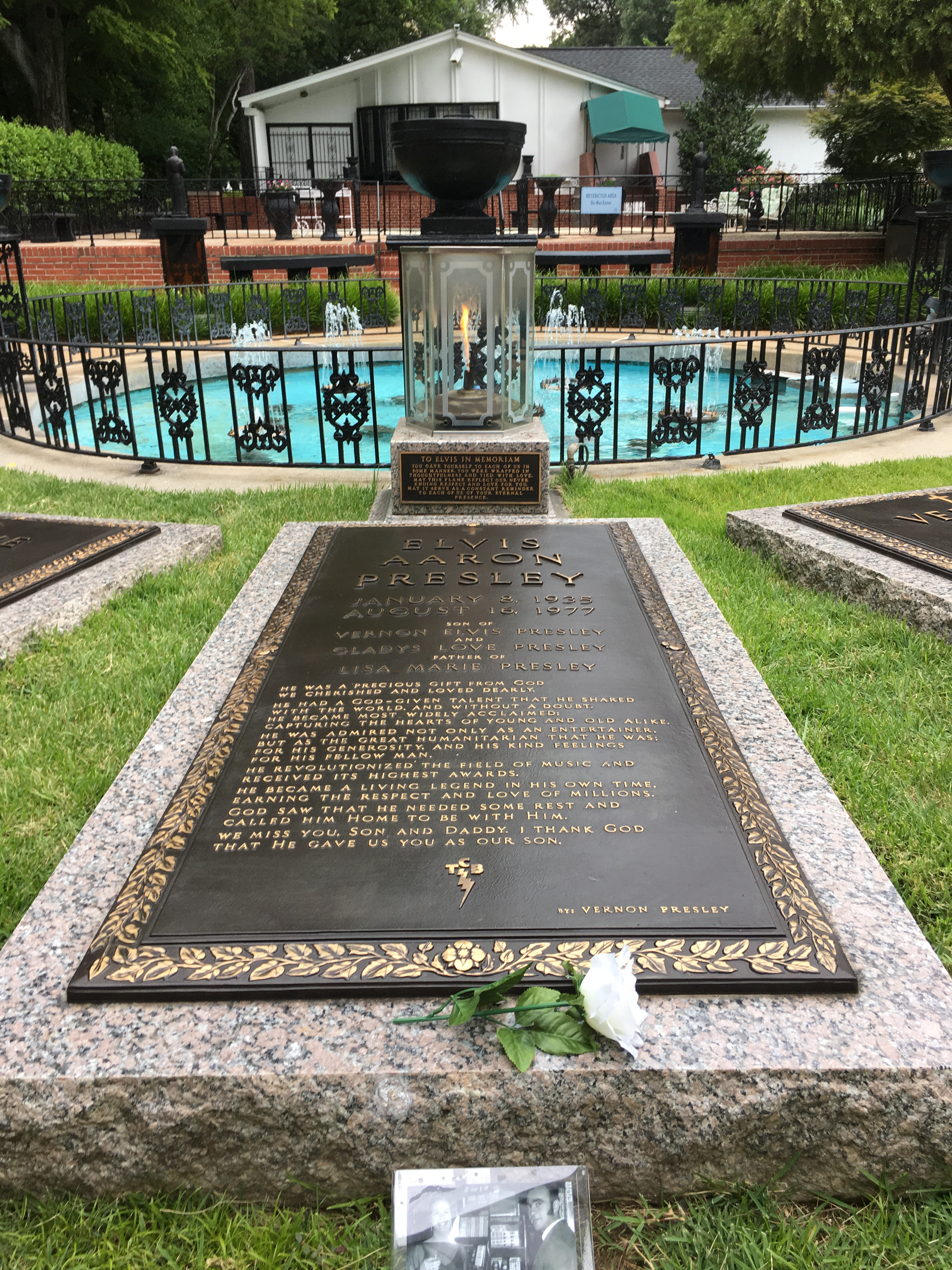
Presley's grave at Graceland

Presley's funeral was held at Graceland on August 18. Outside the gates, a car crashed into a group of fans, killing two young women and critically injuring a third. About 80,000 people lined the processional route to Forest Hill Cemetery, where Presley was buried next to his mother. Within a few weeks, "Way Down" topped the country and UK singles charts. After an attempt to steal Presley's body in late August, the remains of both Presley and his mother were exhumed and reburied in Graceland's Meditation Garden on October 2.

=== Cause of death ===
While an autopsy, undertaken the same day Presley died, was still in progress, Memphis medical examiner Jerry Francisco announced that the immediate cause of death was cardiac arrest and declared that "drugs played no role in Presley's death". In fact, "drug use was heavily implicated" in Presley's death, writes Guralnick. The pathologists conducting the autopsy considered it possible that he had suffered "anaphylactic shock brought on by the codeine pills he had gotten from his dentist, to which he was known to have had a mild allergy". Lab reports filed two months later strongly suggested that polypharmacy was the primary cause of death; one reported "fourteen drugs in Elvis' system, ten in significant quantity". In 1979, forensic pathologist Cyril Wecht reviewed the reports and concluded that a combination of depressants had resulted in Presley's accidental death. Forensic historian and pathologist Michael Baden viewed the situation as complicated: "Elvis had an enlarged heart for a long time. That, together with his drug habit, caused his death. But he was difficult to diagnose; it was a judgment call."

The competence and ethics of two of the centrally involved medical professionals were seriously questioned. Francisco had offered a cause of death before the autopsy was complete; claimed the underlying ailment was cardiac arrhythmia, a condition that can be determined only in a living person; and denied drugs played any part in Presley's death before the toxicology results were known. Allegations of a cover-up were widespread. While a 1981 trial of Presley's main physician, George C. Nichopoulos, exonerated him of criminal liability, the facts were startling: "In the first eight months of 1977 alone, he had [prescribed] more than 10,000 doses of sedatives, amphetamines, and narcotics: all in Elvis' name." Nichopoulos' license was suspended for three months. It was permanently revoked in the 1990s after the Tennessee Medical Board brought new charges of over-prescription.

In 1994, the Presley autopsy report was reopened. Joseph Davis, who had conducted thousands of autopsies as Dade County, Florida coroner, declared at its completion, "There is nothing in any of the data that supports a death from drugs. In fact, everything points to a sudden, violent heart attack." More recent research has revealed that Francisco did not speak for the entire pathology team. Other staff "could say nothing with confidence until they got the results back from the laboratories, if then." One of the examiners, E. Eric Muirhead,

could not believe his ears. Francisco had not only presumed to speak for the hospital's team of pathologists, he had announced a conclusion that they had not reached. ... Early on, a meticulous dissection of the body ... confirmed [that] Elvis was chronically ill with diabetes, glaucoma, and constipation. As they proceeded, the doctors saw evidence that his body had been wracked over a span of years by a large and constant stream of drugs. They had also studied his hospital records, which included two admissions for drug detoxification and methadone treatments.

=== Posthumous developments ===
Between 1977 and 1981, six of Presley's posthumously released singles were top-ten country hits. Graceland was opened to the public in 1982. Attracting over half a million visitors annually, it became the second-most-visited home in the United States, after the White House. The residence was declared a National Historic Landmark in 2006.

Presley has been inducted into seven music halls of fame: the Rock and Roll Hall of Fame (1986), the Country Music Hall of Fame (1998), the Gospel Music Hall of Fame (2001), the Rockabilly Hall of Fame (2007), the Memphis Music Hall of Fame (2012), the National Rhythm & Blues Hall of Fame (2015), and the Mississippi Musicians Hall of Fame (he was also one of the founding members of the defunct UK Music Hall of Fame in 2005). In 1984, he received the W. C. Handy Award from the Blues Foundation and the Academy of Country Music's first Golden Hat Award. In 1987, he received the American Music Awards' Award of Merit.

A Junkie XL remix of Presley's "A Little Less Conversation" (credited as "Elvis Vs JXL") was used in a Nike advertising campaign during the 2002 FIFA World Cup. It topped the charts in over twenty countries and was included in a compilation of Presley's number-one hits, ELV1S, which was also an international success. The album returned Presley to the top of the Billboard chart for the first time in almost three decades.

In 2003, a remix of "Rubberneckin'", a 1969 recording, topped the US sales chart, as did a 50th-anniversary re-release of "That's All Right" the following year. The latter was an outright hit in Britain, debuting at number three on the pop chart; it also made the top ten in Canada. In 2005, another three reissued singles, "Jailhouse Rock", "One Night"/"I Got Stung", and "It's Now or Never", went to number one in the UK. They were part of a campaign that saw the re-release of all eighteen of Presley's previous chart-topping UK singles. The first, "All Shook Up", came with a collectors' box that made it ineligible to chart again; each of the other seventeen reissues hit the British top five.

In 2005, Forbes magazine named Presley the top-earning deceased celebrity for the fifth straight year, with a gross income of $45 million. He was placed second in 2006, returned to the top spot the next two years, and ranked fourth in 2009. The following year, he was ranked second, with his highest annual income ever—$60 million—spurred by the celebration of his 75th birthday and the launch of Cirque du Soleil's Viva Elvis show in Las Vegas. In November 2010, Viva Elvis: The Album was released, setting his voice to newly recorded instrumental tracks. As of mid-2011, there were an estimated 15,000 licensed Presley products, and he was again the second-highest-earning deceased celebrity. Six years later, he ranked fourth with earnings of $35 million, up $8 million from 2016 due in part to the opening of a new entertainment complex, Elvis Presley's Memphis, and hotel, The Guest House at Graceland.

In 2018, RCA/Legacy released Elvis Presley—Where No One Stands Alone, a new album focused on Presley's love of gospel music. Produced by Joel Weinshanker, Lisa Marie Presley, and Andy Childs, the album introduced newly recorded instrumentation, along with vocals from singers who had previously performed with Elvis. It included a reimagined duet with Lisa Marie on the album's title track.

In 2022, Baz Luhrmann's film Elvis biopic was released. Presley is portrayed by Austin Butler and Parker by Tom Hanks. As of August 2022, the film had grossed $261.8 million worldwide on a $85 million budget, becoming the third-highest-grossing music biopic of all-time behind Michael (2026) and Bohemian Rhapsody (2018), and the fifth-highest-grossing Australian-produced film. For his portrayal of Presley, Butler won the Golden Globe and was nominated for the Oscar for Best Actor. In January 2023, Presley's 1962 Lockheed 1329 JetStar sold at an auction for $260,000.

During production of Elvis, Luhrmann unearthed long-lost footage from his epochal residency in Las Vegas from 1969 into the 1970s, as well as previously unseen footage of Presley in outtakes from both Elvis: That's the Way It Is and Elvis on Tour. This would form the basis of EPiC: Elvis Presley in Concert, a new documentary which premiered at the Toronto International Film Festival on September 6, 2025.

== Artistry ==
=== Influences ===
Presley's earliest musical influence came from gospel. His mother recalled that from the age of two, at the Assembly of God church in Tupelo attended by the family, "he would slide down off my lap, run into the aisle and scramble up to the platform. There he would stand looking at the choir and trying to sing with them." In Memphis, Presley frequently attended all-night gospel singings at the Ellis Auditorium, where groups such as the Statesmen Quartet led the music in a style that, Guralnick suggests, sowed the seeds of Presley's future stage act:

The Statesmen were an electric combination ... featuring some of the most thrillingly emotive singing and daringly unconventional showmanship in the entertainment world ... dressed in suits that might have come out of the window of Lansky's. ... Bass singer Jim Wetherington, known universally as the Big Chief, maintained a steady bottom, ceaselessly jiggling first his left leg, then his right, with the material of the pants leg ballooning out and shimmering. "He went about as far as you could go in gospel music," said Jake Hess. "The women would jump up, just like they do for the pop shows." Preachers frequently objected to the lewd movements ... but audiences reacted with screams and swoons.

As a teenager, Presley's musical interests were wide-ranging, and he was deeply informed about both white and African-American musical idioms. Though he never had any formal training, he had a remarkable memory, and his musical knowledge was already considerable by the time he made his first professional recordings aged 19 in 1954. When Jerry Leiber and Mike Stoller met him two years later, they were astonished at his encyclopedic understanding of the blues, and, as Stoller put it, "He certainly knew a lot more than we did about country music and gospel music." At a press conference the following year, he proudly declared, "I know practically every religious song that's ever been written."

=== Musicianship ===
Presley played guitar, bass, and piano; he received his first guitar when he was 11 years old. He could not read or write music and had no formal lessons, and played everything by ear. Presley often played an instrument on his recordings and produced his own music. Presley played rhythm acoustic guitar on most of his Sun recordings and his 1950s RCA Victor albums. Presley played piano on songs such as "Old Shep" and "First in Line" from his 1956 album Elvis. He is credited with playing piano on later albums such as From Elvis in Memphis and "Moody Blue", and on "Unchained Melody", which was one of the last songs that he recorded. Presley played lead guitar on one of his successful singles called "Are You Lonesome Tonight". At one point during the '68 Comeback Special, Elvis took over on lead electric guitar, the first time he had ever been seen with the instrument in public, playing it on songs such as "Baby What You Want Me to Do" and "One Night". The album Elvis is Back! features Presley playing a lot of acoustic guitar on songs such as "I Will Be Home Again" and "Like a Baby".

=== Musical styles and genres ===
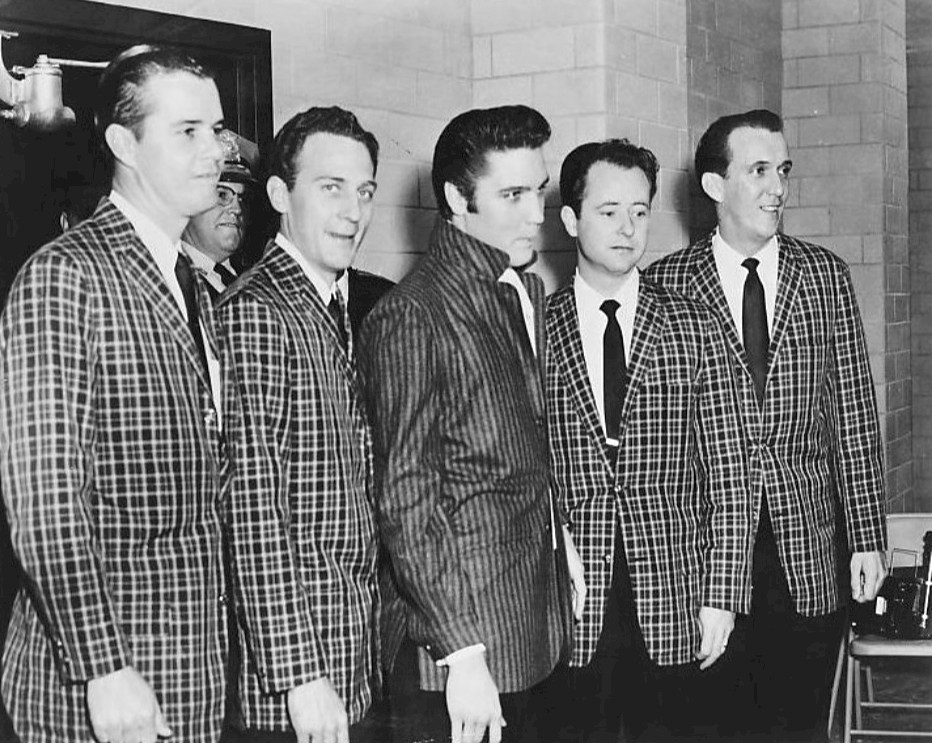
Presley with his longtime vocal backup group, the Jordanaires, March 1957

Presley was a central figure in the development of rockabilly, according to music historians. "Rockabilly crystallized into a recognizable style in 1954 with Elvis Presley's first release, on the Sun label", writes Craig Morrison. Paul Friedlander described rockabilly as "essentially ... an Elvis Presley construction", with the defining elements as "the raw, emotive, and slurred vocal style and emphasis on rhythmic feeling [of] the blues with the string band and strummed rhythm guitar [of] country". In "That's All Right", the Presley trio's first record, Scotty Moore's guitar solo, "a combination of Merle Travis–style country finger-picking, double-stop slides from acoustic boogie, and blues-based bent-note, single-string work, is a microcosm of this fusion". While Katherine Charlton calls Presley "rockabilly's originator", Carl Perkins, another pioneer of rock'n'roll, said that "[Sam] Phillips, Elvis, and I didn't create rockabilly". According to Michael Campbell, the first major rockabilly song was recorded by Bill Haley. In Moore's view, "It had been there for quite a while, really. Carl Perkins was doing basically the same sort of thing up around Jackson, and I know for a fact Jerry Lee Lewis had been playing that kind of music ever since he was ten years old."

At RCA Victor, Presley's rock and roll sound grew distinct from rockabilly with group chorus vocals, more heavily amplified electric guitars, and a tougher, more intense manner. While he was known for taking songs from various sources and giving them a rockabilly/rock and roll treatment, he also recorded songs in other genres from early in his career, from the pop standard "Blue Moon" at Sun Records to the country ballad "How's the World Treating You?" on his second RCA Victor LP to the blues of "Santa Claus Is Back in Town". In 1957, his first gospel record was released, the four-song EP Peace in the Valley. Certified as a million-seller, it became the top-selling gospel EP in recording history.

"Run On"
From How Great Thou Art (1967), a traditional song popular in the black gospel tradition. The arrangement evokes "the percussive style of the 1930s Golden Gate Quartet."

After his return from military service in 1960, Presley continued to perform rock and roll, but the characteristic style was substantially toned down. His first post-Army single, the number-one hit "Stuck on You", is typical of this shift. RCA Victor publicity referred to its "mild rock beat"; discographer Ernst Jorgensen calls it "upbeat pop". The number five "She's Not You" (1962) "integrates the Jordanaires so completely, it's practically doo-wop". The modern blues/R&B sound captured with success on Elvis Is Back! was essentially abandoned for six years until such 1966–67 recordings as "Down in the Alley" and "Hi-Heel Sneakers". Presley's output during most of the 1960s emphasized pop music, often in the form of ballads such as "Are You Lonesome Tonight?", a number-one in 1960. "It's Now or Never", which also topped the chart that year, was a classically influenced variation of pop based on the Neapolitan song "'O sole mio" and concluding with a "full-voiced operatic cadence". These were both dramatic numbers, but most of what Presley recorded for his many film soundtracks was in a much lighter vein.

While Presley performed several of his classic ballads for the '68 Comeback Special, the sound of the show was dominated by aggressive rock and roll. He recorded few new straight rock and roll songs thereafter; as he explained, they had become "hard to find". A significant exception was "Burning Love", his last major hit on the pop charts. Like his work of the 1950s, Presley's subsequent recordings reworked pop and country songs, but in markedly different permutations. His stylistic range now began to embrace a more contemporary rock sound as well as soul and funk. Much of Elvis in Memphis, as well as "Suspicious Minds", cut at the same sessions, reflected this new rock and soul fusion. In the mid-1970s, many of his singles found a home on country radio, the field where he first became a star.

=== Vocal style and range ===
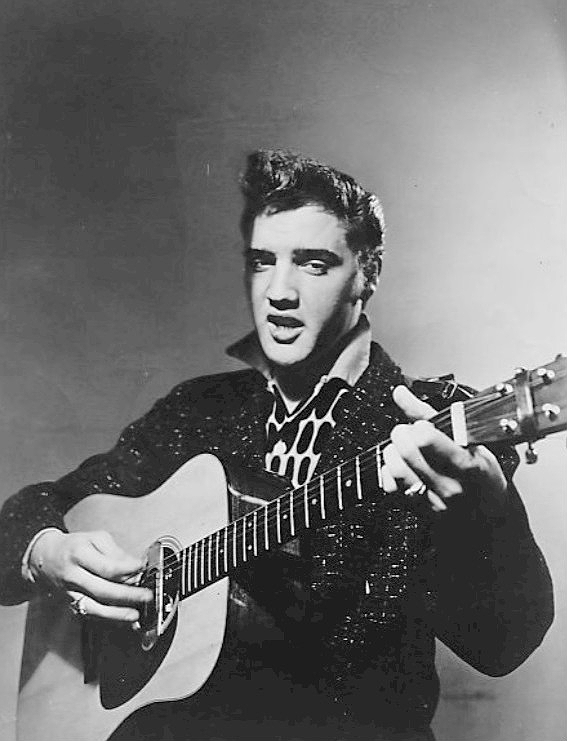
Publicity photo for the CBS program Stage Show, January 16, 1956

The developmental arc of Presley's singing voice, as described by critic Dave Marsh, goes from "high and thrilled in the early days, [to] lower and perplexed in the final months." Marsh credits Presley with the introduction of the "vocal stutter" on 1955's "Baby Let's Play House". When on "Don't Be Cruel", Presley "slides into a 'mmmmm' that marks the transition between the first two verses," he shows "how masterful his relaxed style really is." Marsh describes the vocal performance on "Can't Help Falling in Love" as one of "gentle insistence and delicacy of phrasing", with the line "'Shall I stay' pronounced as if the words are fragile as crystal".

Jorgensen calls the 1966 recording of "How Great Thou Art" "an extraordinary fulfillment of his vocal ambitions", as Presley "crafted for himself an ad-hoc arrangement in which he took every part of the four-part vocal, from [the] bass intro to the soaring heights of the song's operatic climax", becoming "a kind of one-man quartet". Guralnick finds "Stand by Me" from the same gospel sessions "a beautifully articulated, almost nakedly yearning performance", but, by contrast, feels that Presley reaches beyond his powers on "Where No One Stands Alone", resorting "to a kind of inelegant bellowing to push out a sound" that Jake Hess of the Statesmen Quartet had in his command. Hess himself thought that while others might have voices the equal of Presley's, "he had that certain something that everyone searches for all during their lifetime." Guralnick attempts to pinpoint that something: "The warmth of his voice, his controlled use of both vibrato technique and natural falsetto range, the subtlety and deeply felt conviction of his singing were all qualities recognizably belonging to his talent but just as recognizably not to be achieved without sustained dedication and effort."

Marsh praises his 1968 reading of "U.S. Male", "bearing down on the hard guy lyrics, not sending them up or overplaying them but tossing them around with that astonishingly tough yet gentle assurance that he brought to his Sun records." The performance on "In the Ghetto" is, according to Jorgensen, "devoid of any of his characteristic vocal tricks or mannerisms", instead relying on the exceptional "clarity and sensitivity of his voice". Guralnick describes the song's delivery as of "almost translucent eloquence ... so quietly confident in its simplicity". On "Suspicious Minds", Guralnick hears essentially the same "remarkable mixture of tenderness and poise", but supplemented with "an expressive quality somewhere between stoicism (at suspected infidelity) and anguish (over impending loss)".

Music critic Henry Pleasants observes that "Presley has been described variously as a baritone and a tenor. An extraordinary compass ... and a very wide range of vocal color have something to do with this divergence of opinion." He identifies Presley as a high baritone, calculating his range as two octaves and a third, "from the baritone low G to the tenor high B, with an upward extension in falsetto to at least a D♭. Presley's best octave is in the middle, D♭ to D♭, granting an extra full step up or down." In Pleasants' view, his voice was "variable and unpredictable" at the bottom, "often brilliant" at the top, with the capacity for "full-voiced high Gs and As that an opera baritone might envy". Scholar Lindsay Waters, who figures Presley's range as two-and-a-quarter octaves, emphasizes that "his voice had an emotional range from tender whispers to sighs down to shouts, grunts, grumbles, and sheer gruffness that could move the listener from calmness and surrender, to fear. His voice can not be measured in octaves, but in decibels; even that misses the problem of how to measure delicate whispers that are hardly audible at all." Presley was always "able to duplicate the open, hoarse, ecstatic, screaming, shouting, wailing, reckless sound of the black rhythm-and-blues and gospel singers", writes Pleasants, and also demonstrated a remarkable ability to assimilate many other vocal styles.

== Public image ==
=== Relationship with the African-American community ===
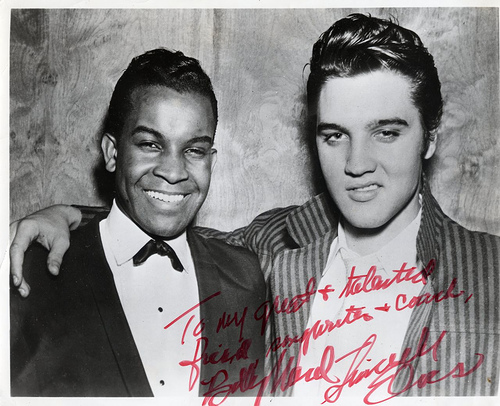
Presley and Billy Ward, c. 1955

When Dewey Phillips first aired "That's All Right" on Memphis' WHBQ, many listeners who contacted the station to ask for it again assumed that its singer was black. From the beginning of his national fame, Presley expressed respect for African-American performers and their music, and disregard for the segregation and racial prejudice then prevalent in the South. Interviewed in 1956, he recalled how in his childhood he would listen to blues musician Arthur Crudup—the originator of "That's All Right"—"bang his box the way I do now, and I said if I ever got to the place where I could feel all old Arthur felt, I'd be a music man like nobody ever saw." The Memphis World, an African-American newspaper, reported that Presley "cracked Memphis' segregation laws" by attending the local amusement park on what was designated as its "colored night". Such statements and actions led Presley to be generally hailed in the black community during his early stardom. In contrast, many white adults "did not like him, and condemned him as depraved. Anti-negro prejudice doubtless figured in adult antagonism. Regardless of whether parents were aware of the Negro sexual origins of the phrase 'rock 'n' roll', Presley impressed them as the visual and aural embodiment of sex."

Despite the largely positive view of Presley held by African Americans, a rumor spread in mid-1957 that he had announced, "The only thing Negroes can do for me is buy my records and shine my shoes." This rumor was started by Sepia, a white-owned magazine appealing to African American audiences, in an April 1957 article titled "How Negroes Feel About Elvis." A journalist with the national African American weekly Jet, Louie Robinson, pursued the story. On the set of Jailhouse Rock, Presley granted Robinson an interview, though he was no longer dealing with the mainstream press. He denied making such a statement:

I never said anything like that, and people who know me know that I wouldn't have said it. ... A lot of people seem to think I started this business. But rock 'n' roll was here a long time before I came along. Nobody can sing that kind of music like colored people. Let's face it: I can't sing like Fats Domino can. I know that.

Robinson found no evidence that the remark had ever been made, and elicited testimony from many individuals indicating that Presley was anything but racist. Blues singer Ivory Joe Hunter, who had heard the rumor before he visited Graceland, reported of Presley, "He showed me every courtesy, and I think he's one of the greatest." Though the rumored remark was discredited, it was still being used against Presley decades later.

In 2017, Joyce Rochelle Vaughn, who investigated the alleged remark since 1997, stated in her book Thirty Pieces of Silver: The Betrayal of Elvis Presley that the alleged racist comment was in fact started by white people involved with Sepia who both sought to make money exploiting such statements and falsifying others because so many whites during the era openly made racist remarks against black people, and who were also dismayed by the fact that Elvis’ music and popularity grew in the black community, with his music even being played on black radio stations. The persistence of such attitudes was fueled by resentment over the fact that Presley, whose musical and visual performance idiom owed much to African-American sources, achieved the cultural acknowledgement and commercial success largely denied to his black peers. Into the twenty-first century, the notion that Presley had "stolen" black music still found adherents. Notable among African-American entertainers expressly rejecting this view was Jackie Wilson, who argued, "A lot of people have accused Elvis of stealing the black man's music, when in fact, almost every black solo entertainer copied his stage mannerisms from Elvis." Moreover, Presley acknowledged his debt to African-American musicians throughout his career. Addressing his '68 Comeback Special audience, he said, "Rock 'n' roll music is basically gospel or rhythm and blues, or it sprang from that. People have been adding to it, adding instruments to it, experimenting with it, but it all boils down to [that]." Nine years earlier, he had said, "Rock 'n' roll has been around for many years. It used to be called rhythm and blues."

=== Sex symbol ===
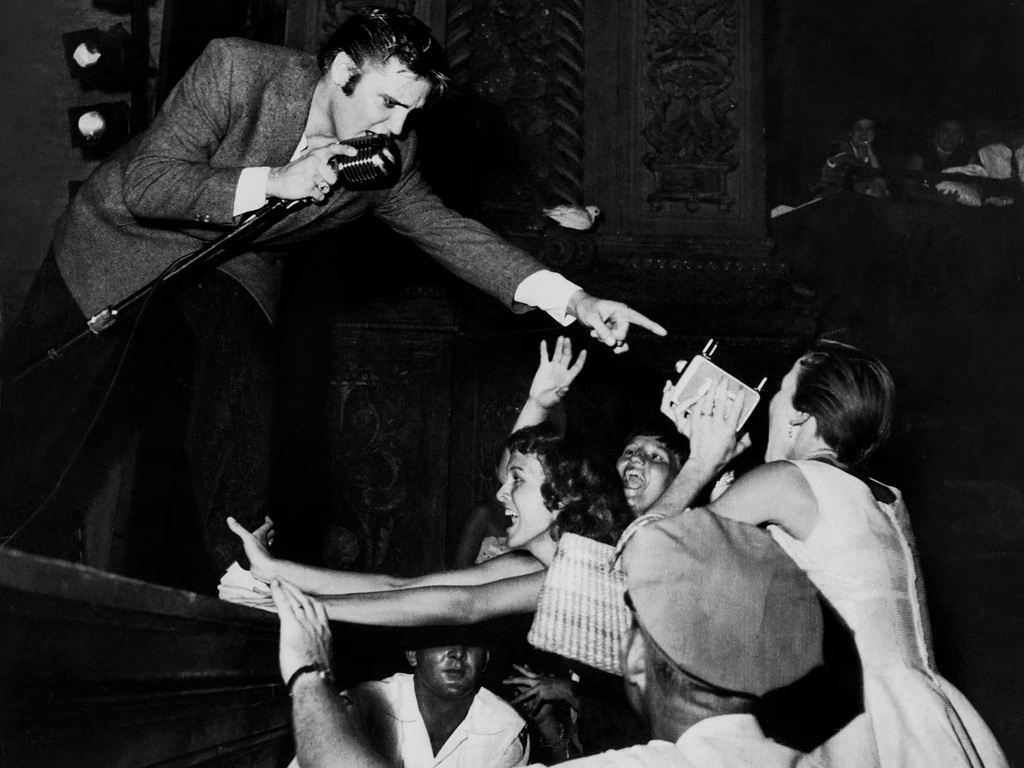
Presley performing live at the Olympia Theater in Miami, August 3, 1956

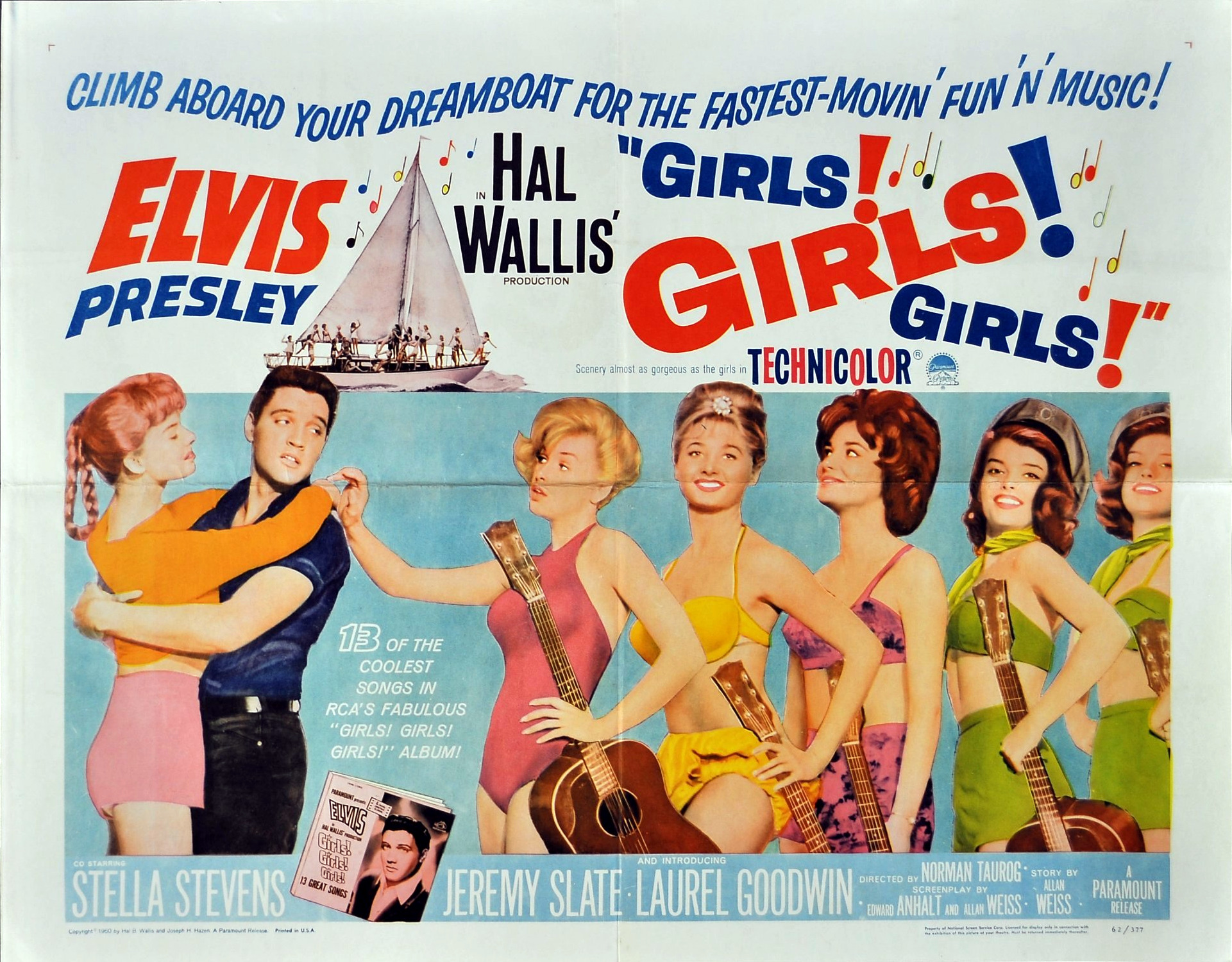
Poster for the film Girls! Girls! Girls! (1962), visualizing Presley's sex symbol image

Presley's physical attractiveness and sexual appeal were widely acknowledged. "He was once beautiful, astonishingly beautiful", according to critic Mark Feeney. Television director Steve Binder reported, "I'm straight as an arrow and I got to tell you, you stop, whether you're male or female, to look at him. He was that good looking. And if you never knew he was a superstar, it wouldn't make any difference; if he'd walked in the room, you'd know somebody special was in your presence." His performance style was equally responsible for Presley's eroticized image. Critic George Melly described him as "the master of the sexual simile, treating his guitar as both phallus and girl". In his Presley obituary, Lester Bangs credited him with bringing "overt blatant vulgar sexual frenzy to the popular arts in America". Ed Sullivan's declaration that he perceived a soda bottle in Presley's trousers was echoed by rumors involving a similarly positioned toilet roll tube or lead bar.

While Presley was marketed as an icon of heterosexuality, some critics have argued that his image was ambiguous. In 1959, Sight and Sound's Peter John Dyer described his onscreen persona as "aggressively bisexual in appeal". Brett Farmer places the "orgasmic gyrations" of the title dance sequence in Jailhouse Rock within a lineage of cinematic musical numbers that offer a "spectacular eroticization, if not homoeroticization, of the male image". In the analysis of Yvonne Tasker, "Elvis was an ambivalent figure who articulated a peculiar feminised, objectifying version of white working-class masculinity as aggressive sexual display."

June Juanico of Memphis, one of Presley's early girlfriends, later blamed Parker for encouraging him to choose his dating partners with publicity in mind. Presley never grew comfortable with the Hollywood scene, and most of these relationships were insubstantial.

== Legacy ==
I know he invented rock and roll, in a manner of speaking, but ... that's not why he's worshiped as a god today. He's worshiped as a god today because in addition to inventing rock and roll he was the greatest ballad singer this side of Frank Sinatra—because the spiritual translucence and reined-in gut sexuality of his slow weeper and torchy pop blues still activate the hormones and slavish devotion of millions of female human beings worldwide.

— Robert Christgau
December 24, 1985

Presley's rise to national attention in 1956 transformed the field of popular music and had a huge effect on the broader scope of popular culture. As the catalyst for the cultural revolution that was rock and roll, he was central not only to defining it as a musical genre but in making it a touchstone of youth culture and rebellious attitude. With its racially mixed origins—repeatedly affirmed by Presley—rock and roll's occupation of a central position in mainstream American culture facilitated a new acceptance and appreciation of black culture. In this regard, Little Richard said of Presley, "He was an integrator. Elvis was a blessing. They wouldn't let black music through. He opened the door for black music." Al Green reaffirmed that by stating, "He broke the ice for all of us."

President Jimmy Carter remarked on Presley's legacy in 1977: "His music and his personality, fusing the styles of white country and black rhythm and blues, permanently changed the face of American popular culture." Presley also heralded the vastly expanded reach of celebrity in the era of mass communication: within a year of his first appearance on American network television, he was regarded as one of the most famous people in the world.

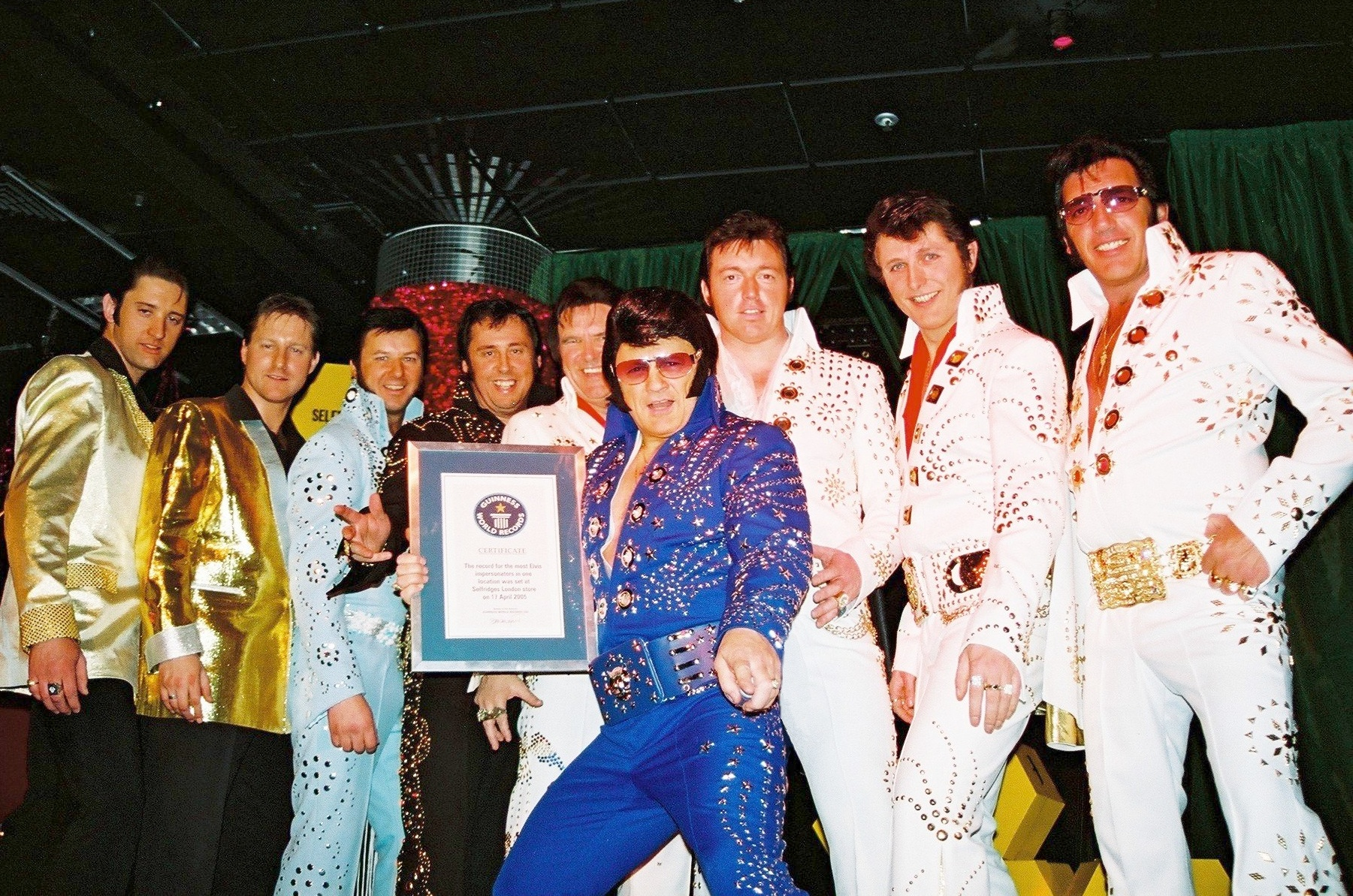
Elvis impersonators in 2005

Presley's name, image, and voice are recognized around the world. He has inspired a legion of impersonators. In polls and surveys, he is recognized as one of the most important popular music artists and influential Americans. (Note: VH1 ranked Presley No. 8 among the "100 Greatest Artists of Rock & Roll" in 1998. The BBC ranked him as the No. 2 "Voice of the Century" in 2001. Rolling Stone placed him No. 3 in its list of "The Immortals: The Fifty Greatest Artists of All Time" in 2004. CMT ranked him No. 15 among the "40 Greatest Men in Country Music" in 2005. The Discovery Channel placed him No. 8 on its "Greatest American" list in 2005. Variety put him in the top ten of its "100 Icons of the Century" in 2005. The Atlantic ranked him No. 66 among the "100 Most Influential Figures in American History" in 2006. Rolling Stone ranked him No. 17 on its 2023 list of the 200 Greatest Singers of All Time.) American composer and conductor Leonard Bernstein said, "Elvis Presley is the greatest cultural force in the twentieth century. He introduced the beat to everything and he changed everything—music, language, clothes." John Lennon said that "Nothing really affected me until Elvis." Bob Dylan described the sensation of first hearing Presley as "like busting out of jail".

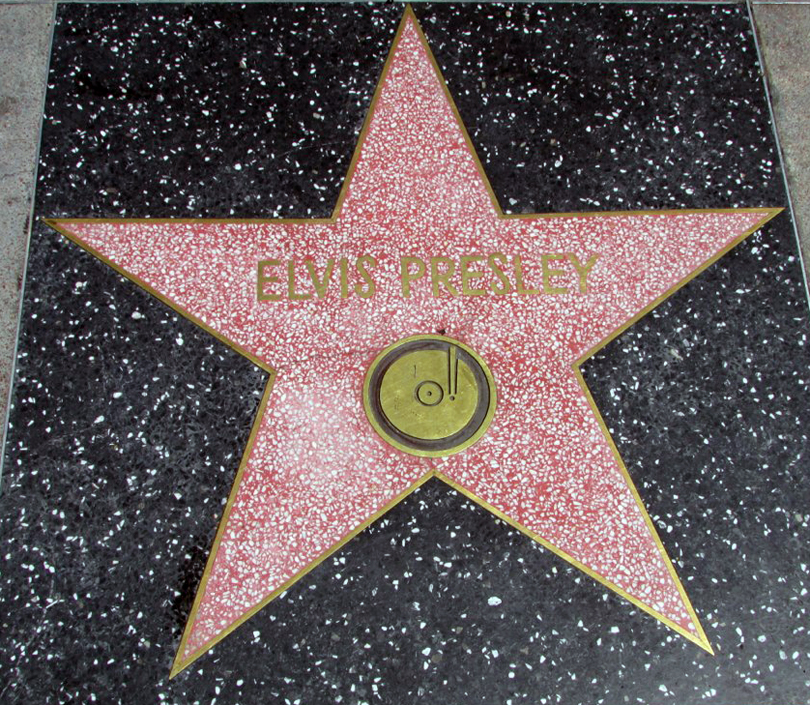
Presley's star on the Hollywood Walk of Fame at 6777 Hollywood Blvd

For much of his adult life, Presley, with his rise from poverty to riches and fame, had seemed to epitomize the American Dream. In his final years, and after the posthumous revelations about his circumstances, he became a symbol of excess and gluttony. Increasing attention was paid to his appetite for the rich, heavy Southern cooking of his upbringing, foods such as chicken-fried steak and biscuits and gravy. In particular, his love of fried peanut butter, banana, and (sometimes) bacon sandwiches, now known as "Elvis sandwiches", came to symbolize this characteristic.

Since 1977, a false and discredited conspiracy theory has circulated that Presley may have faked his own death. Numerous people have incorrectly claimed to have seen him alive after August 16, 1977. These "Elvis sightings" and the conspiracy theory in general have persisted both as an ironic, humorous meme and for some a genuinely-believed theory, though the latter demographic declined in numbers after the early 1990s. A large number of fans have domestic shrines devoted to Presley and journey to sites with which he is connected, however faintly. On every anniversary of his death, thousands of people gather outside Graceland for a candlelight ritual. "With Elvis, it is not just his music that has survived death", writes Ted Harrison. "He himself has been raised, like a medieval saint, to a figure of cultic status. It is as if he has been canonized by acclamation."

On the 25th anniversary of Presley's death, The New York Times asserted:

All the talentless impersonators and appalling black velvet paintings on display can make him seem little more than a perverse and distant memory. But before Elvis was camp, he was its opposite: a genuine cultural force. ... Elvis' breakthroughs are underappreciated because in this rock-and-roll age, his hard-rocking music and sultry style have triumphed so completely.

He was ranked third on Rolling Stone's 100 Greatest Artists. Bono wrote in appreciation:

In Elvis, you have the blueprint for rock & roll. The highness—the gospel highs. The mud—the Delta mud, the blues. Sexual liberation. Controversy. Changing the way people feel about the world. It's all there with Elvis.

I once met with Coretta Scott King, John Lewis and some of the other leaders of the American civil rights movement, and they reminded me of the cultural apartheid rock & roll was up against. I think the hill they climbed would have been much steeper were it not for the racial inroads black music was making on white pop culture. Elvis was already doing what the civil rights movement was demanding: breaking down barriers. You don’t think of Elvis as political, but that is politics: changing the way people see the world.

In the Eighties, U2 went to Memphis, to Sun Studio — the scene of rock & roll’s big bang. Elvis’ music diviner Cowboy Jack Clement opened the studio so we could cut some tracks within the same four walls where Elvis recorded 'Mystery Train.' He found the old valve microphone the King had howled through; the reverb was the same reverb: 'Train I ride, 16 coaches long.' It was a small tunnel of a place, but there was a certain clarity to the sound. You can hear it in those Sun records, and they are the ones for me. The King didn’t know he was the King yet. Elvis doesn’t know where the train will take him, and that’s why we want to be passengers.

Not only Presley's achievements but his failings as well, are seen by some cultural observers as adding to the power of his legacy, as in this description by Greil Marcus:

Elvis Presley is a supreme figure in American life, one whose presence, no matter how banal or predictable, brooks no real comparisons. ... The cultural range of his music has expanded to the point where it includes not only the hits of the day, but also patriotic recitals, pure country gospel, and really dirty blues. ... Elvis has emerged as a great artist, a great rocker, a great purveyor of schlock, a great heart throb, a great bore, a great symbol of potency, a great ham, a great nice person, and, yes, a great American.

== Achievements ==
Presley is one of the best-selling music artists in history, with worldwide record sales estimated at 500 million. Presley's rankings for top ten and number-one hits vary depending on how the double-sided "Hound Dog/Don't Be Cruel" and "Don't/I Beg of You" singles, which precede the inception of Billboard's unified Hot 100 chart, are analyzed. (Note: Whitburn follows actual Billboard history in considering the four songs on the "Don't Be Cruel/Hound Dog" and "Don't/I Beg of You" singles as distinct. He tallies each side of the former single as a number-one (Billboard's sales chart had "Don't Be Cruel" at number one for five weeks, then "Hound Dog" for six) and reckons "I Beg of You" as a top ten, as it reached number eight on the old Top 100 chart. Billboard now considers both singles as unified items, ignoring the historical sales split of the former and its old Top 100 chart entirely. Whitburn thus analyzes the four songs as yielding three number ones and a total of four top tens. Billboard now states that they yielded just two number ones and a total of two top tens, voiding the separate chart appearances of "Hound Dog" and "I Beg of You".) According to Whitburn's analysis, Presley holds the record with 38, tying with Madonna; per Billboard's current assessment, he ranks second with 36. Whitburn and Billboard concur that the Beatles hold the record for most number-one hits with 20, and that Mariah Carey is second with 19. Whitburn has Presley with 18: Billboard has him third with 17. According to Billboard, Presley has 79 cumulative weeks at number one: alone at 80, according to Whitburn and the Rock and Roll Hall of Fame, with only Mariah Carey having more with 91 weeks. He holds the records for most number-one singles on the UK chart with 21 and singles reaching the top ten with 76.

As an album artist, Presley is credited by Billboard with the record for the most albums charting in the Billboard 200: 129, far ahead of second-place Frank Sinatra's 82. He also holds the record for most cumulative weeks at number one on the Billboard 200 for a male solo artists: 67 weeks In 2015 and 2016, two albums setting Presley's vocals against music by the Royal Philharmonic Orchestra, If I Can Dream and The Wonder of You, both reached number one in the UK. This gave him a new record for number-one UK albums by a solo artist with 13, and extended his record for longest span between number-one albums by anybody—Presley had first topped the British chart in 1956 with his self-titled debut.

As of 2023, the Recording Industry Association of America (RIAA) credits Presley with 146.5 million certified album sales in the US, third all time behind the Beatles and Garth Brooks. He holds the records for most gold albums (101, nearly double second-place Barbra Streisand's 51), and most platinum albums (57). His 25 multi-platinum albums is second behind the Beatles' 26. He has the 9th-most gold singles (54, tied with Justin Bieber), and the 16th-most platinum singles (27).

In 2012, the spider Paradonea presleyi was named in his honor. In 2018, President Donald Trump awarded Presley the Presidential Medal of Freedom posthumously. There is a street named after Presley in San Antonio, Texas.

== Discography ==
A vast number of recordings have been issued under Presley's name. The number of his original master recordings has been disputed but variously calculated as 665 and 711.

Studio albums

- Elvis Presley (1956)
- Elvis (1956)
- Elvis' Christmas Album (1957)
- Elvis Is Back! (1960)
- His Hand in Mine (1960)
- Something for Everybody (1961)
- Pot Luck (1962)
- Elvis for Everyone! (1965)
- How Great Thou Art (1967)
- From Elvis in Memphis (1969)
- From Memphis to Vegas / From Vegas to Memphis (1969)
- That's the Way It Is (1970)
- Elvis Country (I'm 10,000 Years Old) (1971)
- Love Letters from Elvis (1971)
- Elvis Sings The Wonderful World of Christmas (1971)
- Elvis Now (1972)
- He Touched Me (1972)
- Elvis (1973) (The "Fool" Album)
- Raised on Rock / For Ol' Times Sake (1973)
- Good Times (1974)
- Promised Land (1975)
- Today (1975)
- From Elvis Presley Boulevard, Memphis, Tennessee (1976)
- Moody Blue (1977)

Soundtrack albums (original material)

- Loving You (1957)
- King Creole (1958)
- G.I. Blues (1960)
- Blue Hawaii (1961)
- Girls! Girls! Girls! (1962)
- It Happened at the World's Fair (1963)
- Fun in Acapulco (1963)
- Kissin' Cousins (1964)
- Roustabout (1964)
- Girl Happy (1965)
- Harum Scarum (1965)
- Frankie and Johnny (1966)
- Paradise, Hawaiian Style (1966)
- Spinout (1966)
- Double Trouble (1967)
- Clambake (1967)
- Speedway (1968)

== Filmography ==
Films starred

- Love Me Tender (1956)
- Loving You (1957)
- Jailhouse Rock (1957)
- King Creole (1958)
- G.I. Blues (1960)
- Flaming Star (1960)
- Wild in the Country (1961)
- Blue Hawaii (1961)
- Follow That Dream (1962)
- Kid Galahad (1962)
- Girls! Girls! Girls! (1962)
- It Happened at the World's Fair (1963)
- Fun in Acapulco (1963)
- Kissin' Cousins (1964)
- Viva Las Vegas (1964)
- Roustabout (1964)
- Girl Happy (1965)
- Tickle Me (1965)
- Harum Scarum (1965)
- Frankie and Johnny (1966)
- Paradise, Hawaiian Style (1966)
- Spinout (1966)
- Easy Come, Easy Go (1967)
- Double Trouble (1967)
- Clambake (1967)
- Stay Away, Joe (1968)
- Speedway (1968)
- Live a Little, Love a Little (1968)
- Charro! (1969)
- The Trouble with Girls (1969)
- Change of Habit (1969)
- Elvis: That's the Way It Is (1970)
- Elvis on Tour (1972)

TV concert specials

- Elvis (1968)
- Aloha from Hawaii via Satellite (1973)
- Elvis in Concert (1977)

== See also ==
- Elvis Evolution – Immersive theatrical show
- Elvis Presley Enterprises – Corporate entity
- List of artists by number of UK Albums Chart number ones
- List of artists by number of UK Singles Chart number ones
- List of bestselling music artists
- Personal relationships of Elvis Presley
