= VG-lista 1962 =

Norwegian music chart

This is a complete list of all the singles that entered the VG-lista - the official Norwegian hit-chart - in 1962. 57 singles entered the VG-lista in 1962 all together and these are all listed below according to how well they have charted over time.

== Detaile listing of Number-one hits in 1962 ==
| Week | Artist | Single | Country | Weeks | | | Straight to #1 ? |
| Week | Artist | Single | Country | Top 1 | Top 10 | Top 20 | Straight to #1 ? |
|---|---|---|---|---|---|---|---|
| 1 | Cliff Richard | "When the Girl in Your Arms Is the Girl in Your Heart" | (United Kingdom) | 8 | | | |
| 2 | Cliff Richard | "When the Girl in Your Arms Is the Girl in Your Heart" | | | | | |
| 3 | Pat Boone | "Johnny Will" | (United States) | 2 | 8 | | No |
| 4 | Pat Boone | "Johnny Will" | | | | | |
| 5 | Leroy Van Dyke | "Walk On By" | (United States) | 4 | 13 | | No |
| 6 | Leroy Van Dyke | "Walk On By" | | | | | |
| 7 | Leroy Van Dyke | "Walk On By" | | | | | |
| 8 | Leroy Van Dyke | "Walk On By" | | | | | |
| 9 | Grynet Molvig | "Det var du som sa nei" | (Norway) | 3 | 14 | | No |
| 10 | Grynet Molvig | "Det var du som sa nei" | | | | | |
| 11 | Grynet Molvig | "Det var du som sa nei" | | | | | |
| 12 | Anita Lindblom | "Sånt är livet" | (Sweden) | 7 | 22 | | No |
| 13 | Anita Lindblom | "Sånt är livet" | | | | | |
| 14 | Anita Lindblom | "Sånt är livet" | | | | | |
| 15 | Anita Lindblom | "Sånt är livet" | | | | | |
| 16 | Anita Lindblom | "Sånt är livet" | | | | | |
| 17 | Anita Lindblom | "Sånt är livet" | | | | | |
| 18 | Anita Lindblom | "Sånt är livet" | | | | | |
| 19 | Conny Froboess | "Zwei Kleine Italiener" | (Germany) | 2 | 21 | | No |
| 20 | Conny Froboess | "Zwei Kleine Italiener" | | | | | |
| 21 | Elvis Presley | "Good Luck Charm" | (United States) | 11 | 20 | | No |
| 22 | Elvis Presley | "Good Luck Charm" | | | | | |
| 23 | Elvis Presley | "Good Luck Charm" | | | | | |
| 24 | Elvis Presley | "Good Luck Charm" | | | | | |
| 25 | Elvis Presley | "Good Luck Charm" | | | | | |
| 26 | Elvis Presley | "Good Luck Charm" | | | | | |
| 27 | Elvis Presley | "Good Luck Charm" | | | | | |
| 28 | Elvis Presley | "Good Luck Charm" | | | | | |
| 29 | Elvis Presley | "Good Luck Charm" | | | | | |
| 30 | Elvis Presley | "Good Luck Charm" | | | | | |
| 31 | Elvis Presley | "Good Luck Charm" | | | | | |
| 32 | Pat Boone | "Speedy Gonzales" | (United States) | 6 | 14 | | No |
| 33 | Pat Boone | "Speedy Gonzales" | | | | | |
| 34 | Pat Boone | "Speedy Gonzales" | | | | | |
| 35 | Pat Boone | "Speedy Gonzales" | | | | | |
| 36 | Pat Boone | "Speedy Gonzales" | | | | | |
| 37 | Pat Boone | "Speedy Gonzales" | | | | | |
| 38 | Bobby Vinton | "Roses Are Red" | (United States) | 2 | 13 | | No |
| 39 | Bobby Vinton | "Roses Are Red" | | | | | |
| 40 | Elvis Presley | "She's Not You" | (United States) | 6 | 13 | | No |
| 41 | Elvis Presley | "She's Not You" | | | | | |
| 42 | Elvis Presley | "She's Not You" | | | | | |
| 43 | Elvis Presley | "She's Not You" | | | | | |
| 44 | Elvis Presley | "She's Not You" | | | | | |
| 45 | Elvis Presley | "She's Not You" | | | | | |
| 46 | Little Eva | "The Loco-Motion" | (United States) | 2 | 16 | | No |
| 47 | Little Eva | "The Loco-Motion" | | | | | |
| 48 | Elvis Presley | "King of the Whole Wide World" | (United States) | 2 | 10 | | No |
| 49 | Elvis Presley | "King of the Whole Wide World" | | | | | |
| 50 | Elvis Presley | "Return to Sender" | (United States) | 11 | 15 | | No |
| 51 | Elvis Presley | "Return to Sender" | | | | | |
| 52 | Elvis Presley | "Return to Sender" | | | | | |

== Top singles of 1962 ==
| Position | Artist | Song title | Highest position | Points |
|---|---|---|---|---|
| 1 | Chubby Checker | "Let's Twist Again" | 2 | 518 |
| 2 | Anita Lindblom | "Sån't är livet" | 1 | 383 |
| 3 | Elvis Presley | "Good Luck Charm" | 1 | 368 |
| 4 | Conny Froboess | "Zwei kleine Italiener" | 1 | 366 |
| 5 | Cliff Richard | "The Young Ones" | 2 | 294 |
| 6 | Elvis Presley | "Return to Sender" | 1 | 288 |
| 7 | Nora Brockstedt | "Æille så ner som a Ingebjørg" | 2 | 263 |
| 8 | Jim Reeves | "Adios Amigo" | 2 | 257 |
| 9 | Little Eva | "The Loco-Motion" | 1 | 254 |
| 10 | Pat Boone | "Speedy Gonzales" | 1 | 253 |
| 11 | Grynet Molvig | "Det var du som sa nei" | 1 | 247 |
| 12 | Bobby Vinton | "Roses Are Red (My Love)" | 1 | 233 |
| 13 | Elvis Presley | "She's Not You" | 1 | 232 |
| 14 | Leroy Van Dyke | "Walk On By" | 1 | 231 |
| 15 | Jim Reeves | "You're the Only Good Thing (That's Happened to Me)" | 2 | 228 |
| 16 | Cliff Richard | "I'm Lookin' Out the Window" | 2 | 214 |
| 17 | Ray Adams | "Jag har bott vid en landsväg" | 5 | 187 |
| 18 | Bobby Darin | "Multiplication" | 4 | 183 |
| 19 | Ray Charles | "I Can't Stop Loving You" | 4 | 179 |
| 20 | Elvis Presley | "King of the Whole Wide World" | 1 | 175 |
| 21 | Chris Montez | "Let's Dance" | 2 | 173 |
| 22 | Frank Ifield | "Lovesick Blues" | 2 | 169 |
| 23 | Elvis Presley | "Rock-A-Hula Baby" | 6 | 144 |
| 24 | The Shadows | "Wonderful Land" | 2 | 143 |
| 25 | Jack Dailey | "No øl, no vin, no dram" | 5 | 140 |
| 26 | Pat Boone | "Johnny Will" | 1 | 137 |
| 27 | Roy Orbison | "Dream Baby" | 5 | 136 |
| 28 | Cliff Richard and the Shadows | "It'll Be Me" | 2 | 129 |
| 29 | The Monn Keys | "Stakkars store sterke karer" | 5 | 127 |
| 30 | Perry Como" | "Caterina" | 6 | 121 |
| 31 | Duane Eddy & The Rebeletts | "(Dance With The) Guitar Man" | 3 | 114 |
| 32 | Peter Kraus | "Schwarze Rose, Rosemarie" | 5 | 110 |
| 33 | Kenny Ball and his Jazzmen | "Midnight in Moscow" | 6 | 109 |
| 34 | Johnny Tillotson | "Send Me the Pillow You Dream On" | 3 | 107 |
| 35 | Nat King Cole | "Ramblin' Rose" | 5 | 104 |
| 36 | Frank Ifield | "I Remember You" | 4 | 101 |
| 37 | Helen Shapiro | "Tell Me What He Said" | 5 | 100 |
| 38 | Bobby Darin | "Things" | 5 | 99 |
| 39 | Burl Ives | "A Little Bitty Tear" | 5 | 98 |
| 40 | Brian Hyland | "Ginny Come Lately" | 5 | 94 |
| 41 | The Tornados | "Telstar" | 3 | 92 |
| 42 | Susan Maughan | "Bobby's Girl" | 6 | 86 |
| 43 | Dave Appell | "Happy Jose" | 6 | 77 |
| 44 | Del Shannon | "Swiss Maid" | 8 | 75 |
| 45 | Brenda Lee | "Speak to Me Pretty" | 8 | 72 |
| 46 | Clyde McPhatter | "Lover Please" | 6 | 64 |
| 47 | Mike Sarne | "Come Outside" | 7 | 62 |
| 48 | Neil Sedaka | "Happy Birthday Sweet Sixteen" | 8 | 60 |
| 49 | Gunnar Engedahl & Erling Stordahl | "I tresko og busserull" | 7 | 48 |
| 50 | The Drifters | "When My Little Girl Is Smiling" | 8 | 47 |
| 51 | Nora Brockstedt | "Guri Malla" | 8 | 36 |
| 52 | The Quivers | "Piken i dalen" | 9 | 34 |
| 53 | Jan Høiland | "Quando, Quando, Quando" | 10 | 33 |
| 54 | Bjørg og Per Gunnar | "Mari og Ola" | 9 | 23 |
| 55 | The Shadows | "Guitar Tango" | 10 | 22 |
| 56 | Paul Anka | "A Steel Guitar and a Glass of Wine" | 10 | 11 |
| 57 | Kenny Ball and his Jazzmen | "March of the Siamese Children" | 11 | 10 |
