= Elvis' Golden Records Volume 3 =

Greatest hits album by Elvis Presley
- Released: August 12, 1963
- Recorded: March 20, 1960 – March 19, 1962
- Genre: Rock and roll
- Length: 29:42
- Label: RCA Victor
- Producer: Stephen H. Sholes

Elvis Presley chronology
It Happened at the World's Fair (1963)	Elvis' Golden Records Volume 3 (1963)	Fun in Acapulco (1963)

Professional ratings
Review scores
Source	Rating
Allmusic	4.5/5 stars
Record Mirror	5/5 stars

Elvis' Golden Records Volume 3 is a greatest hits album by American rock and roll singer Elvis Presley, released by RCA Victor as LPM/LSP-2765 on August 12, 1963. The album was the third volume of an eventual five volume collection, and his eighteenth altogether. It is a compilation of hit singles released in 1960, 1961, and 1962.

The album was originally released as a mono and stereo LP record and was reissued several times on compact disc. It peaked at number three on the Billboard Top Pop Albums chart. The album was certified Gold on November 1, 1966, and Platinum on March 27, 1992, by the Recording Industry Association of America.

== Background ==
Presley's manager, Colonel Tom Parker, envisioned a marketing strategy of alternating soundtrack albums with independent studio recordings, accompanied by singles. During this time, his two biggest selling albums had been soundtracks. With all of secular albums from 1960-1963 being very successful peaking in the top four. Sessions in late May of 63, had produced enough material for an album; however, RCA and Colonel Parker knew a guaranteed big seller would be another entry in the gold record series. Also, two of the 12 songs had been used for his latest single release and there was not enough new material for a studio album (Colonel Parker normally wouldn't allow single releases to be album tracks) The immediate solution was another compilation of hit singles, the sales numbers proving the success of this interim strategy.

== Content ==
Golden Records Volume 3 comprises eight Top Five A-sides along with four b-sides which also made the Top 40, "Fame and Fortune", "I Gotta Know", "Little Sister", and "Anything That's Part of You". Five A-Sides, "Stuck on You", "It's Now or Never", "Are You Lonesome Tonight?", "Surrender", and "Good Luck Charm" went to #1. "It's Now or Never" had been adapted from the 1898 Neapolitan song "'O sole mio," and "Are You Lonesome Tonight", a ballad from 1926, had been a rare request from Parker to Presley for Parker's wife. As with the other titles in the series, all singles in this compilation are certified by the RIAA as attaining gold status with sales of at least 500,000 copies.

Original recordings produced by Steve Sholes, Joseph Lilley, Chet Atkins, Urban Thielmann, Jeff Alexander, and Hans J. Salter.

== Reissues ==
RCA first issued the original 12-track album on compact disc in 1989. The second CD reissue in 1997 added six bonus tracks, those being two album tracks, two songs originally issued on EP singles, another b-side, and the number two hit single "Can't Help Falling In Love" from the soundtrack to Blue Hawaii. "The Girl of My Best Friend" was taken from the album Elvis Is Back!, and "Wooden Heart" from the soundtrack to G.I. Blues. "Wooden Heart" would be reissued as a b-side twice, once in 1964 and again in 1965, and the b-side "Wild in the Country" is the title track to the film of the same name. The remaining pair of film songs, "Follow That Dream" and "King of the Whole Wide World", are respectively from the EP soundtracks to the Presley movies Follow That Dream and Kid Galahad. RCA later reissued the album on CD again with the bonus tracks removed and the original running order restored.

== Track listing ==
Chart positions for singles taken from Billboard Pop Singles chart where noted.

=== Original release ===
Side one
No.	Z	Song Title	Writer(s)	Recorded	Catalogue	Release Date	Chart Peak	Length
1.		"It's Now or Never"	Eduardo di Capua, Aaron Schroeder, Wally Gold	April 3, 1960	47-7777	July 5, 1960	1	3:15
2.		"Stuck on You"	Aaron Schroeder, J. Leslie McFarland	March 20, 1960	47-7740	March 23, 1960	1	2:18
3.		"Fame and Fortune"	Fred Wise, Ben Weisman	March 20, 1960	47-7740b	March 23, 1960	17	2:30
4.		"I Gotta Know"	Paul Evans, Matt Williams	April 3, 1960	47-7810b	November 1, 1960	20	2:15
5.		"Surrender"	Doc Pomus, Mort Shuman	October 30, 1960	47-7850	February 7, 1961	1	1:52
6.		"I Feel So Bad"	Chuck Willis	March 12, 1961	47-7880	May 2, 1961	5	2:54
Side two
No.		Song Title	Writer(s)	Recorded	Catalogue	Release Date	Chart Peak	Length
1.		"Are You Lonesome Tonight?"	Lou Handman, Roy Turk	April 3, 1960	47-7810	November 1, 1960	1	3:05
2.		"(Marie's the Name) His Latest Flame"	Doc Pomus, Mort Shuman	June 25, 1961	47-7908	August 8, 1961	4	2:08
3.		"Little Sister"	Doc Pomus, Mort Shuman	June 25, 1961	47-7908b	August 8, 1961	5	2:31
4.		"Good Luck Charm"	Aaron Schroeder, Wally Gold	October 15, 1961	47-7992	February 27, 1962	1	2:24
5.		"Anything That's Part of You"	Don Robertson	October 15, 1961	47-7992b	February 27, 1962	31	2:05
6.		"She's Not You"	Doc Pomus, Jerry Leiber and Mike Stoller	March 19, 1962	47-8041	July 17, 1962	5	2:08

=== 1997 Reissue bonus tracks ===
Tracks 1–12 are from the original album
No.	Song title	Writer(s)	Recorded	Catalogue	Release date	Chart peak	Length
13.	"Wild in the Country"	George David Weiss, Hugo Peretti and Luigi Creatore	November 7, 1960	47-7880b	May 2, 1961	26	1:52
14.	"Wooden Heart"	Fred Wise, Ben Weisman	April 28, 1960	LSP 2256 (G.I. Blues)	October 1, 1960	—	2:02
15.	"The Girl of My Best Friend"	Beverly Ross, Sam Bobrick	April 3, 1960	LSP 2231 (Elvis Is Back!)	April 8, 1960	—	2:21
16.	"Follow That Dream"	Fred Wise, Ben Weisman	July 2, 1961	EPA 4368 (Follow That Dream)	April 1, 1962	15	1:37
17.	"King of the Whole Wide World"	Ruth Batchelor, Bob Roberts	October 27, 1961	EPA 4371 (Kid Galahad)	August 1, 1962	30	2:06
18.	"Can't Help Falling In Love"	George David Weiss, Hugo Peretti and Luigi Creatore	March 23, 1961	47-7968	November 22, 1961	2	2:59

== Personnel ==
- Elvis Presley – vocals, acoustic guitar
- Scotty Moore – rhythm guitar, lead guitar on "Stuck on You" and "Fame and Fortune"
- Hank Garland – lead guitar, bass on "Stuck on You," "Fame and Fortune," and "(Marie's the Name) His Latest Flame"
- Tiny Timbrell – guitar on 1997 bonus tracks "Wooden Heart", "King of the Whole Wide World," and "Wild in the Country"
- Neal Matthews – lead guitar on "(Marie's the Name) His Latest Flame", rhythm guitar on 1997 bonus track "King of the Whole Wide World"
- Harold Bradley – guitar on "She's Not You” and six-string bass on "Little Sister"
- Jerry Kennedy – lead guitar on "Good Luck Charm" and "Anything That's Part of You"
- Grady Martin – guitar or vibraphone on "She's Not You"
- Floyd Cramer – piano, organ
- Gordon Stoker – piano
- Dudley Brooks – piano on 1997 bonus track "Wild in the Country"
- Bob Moore – double bass
- Ray Siegel – double bass on 1997 bonus track “Wooden Heart"
- Meyer Rubin – double bass on 1997 bonus track “Wild in the Country"
- D.J. Fontana – drums
- Buddy Harman – drums
- Hal Blaine – drums or percussion on 1997 bonus track “Can’t Help Falling In Love”
- Bernie Mattinson – drums, percussion
- Boots Randolph – saxophone, vibraphone
- Jimmie Haskell – accordion on 1997 bonus track "Wild in the Country"
- The Jordanaires – backing vocals
- Millie Kirkham – backing vocals

== Charts and certifications ==
=== Album ===
Chart (1963)	Peak position
US Billboard 200	3

Chart (1964)	Peak position
UK Albums Chart	6

Chart (1977)	Peak position
French Top Albums	6

=== Certifications ===
Region	Certification	Certified units/sales
France (SNEP)	Gold	100,000^{*}
United States (RIAA)	Platinum	1,000,000^{^}
^{*} Sales figures based on certification alone.^{^} Shipments figures based on certification alone.
