= It Happened at the World's Fair (soundtrack) =

Soundtrack album by Elvis Presley
- Released: April 10, 1963
- Recorded: August 30 and September 22, 1962
- Studio: Radio Recorders (Hollywood)
- Genre: Rock and roll
- Length: 21:21
- Label: RCA Victor
- Producer: Leith Stevens

Elvis Presley chronology
Girls! Girls! Girls! (1962)	It Happened at the World's Fair (1963)	Elvis' Golden Records Volume 3 (1963)

Singles from It Happened at the World's Fair
- 1. "One Broken Heart for Sale" b/w "They Remind Me Too Much of You" Released: January 1963

Professional ratings
Review scores
Source	Rating
AllMusic	2.5/5 stars

It Happened at the World's Fair is the sixth soundtrack album by American singer and musician Elvis Presley, released by RCA Victor in mono and stereo, LPM/LSP 2697, in April 1963. It is the soundtrack to the 1963 film of the same name starring Presley. Recording sessions took place at Radio Recorders in Hollywood on August 30 and September 22, 1962. It peaked at number four on the Billboard Top Pop Albums chart.

== Content ==
Initially booked for August 28 and 29, sessions were delayed as Presley had taken ill, and only two numbers were completed satisfactorily on the first night of August 30. Ten songs were tackled for the soundtrack, the standouts being two written by one of Presley's favorite songwriters, Don Robertson (who took an active part in the sessions by playing keyboards), and one by Otis Blackwell and Winfield Scott, the team that had written the No. 2 hit single "Return to Sender" the previous year. All three of these songs, "I'm Falling In Love Tonight", "They Remind Me Too Much of You", and "One Broken Heart for Sale", would be included on the 1995 compilation CD Command Performances: The Essential 60s Masters II.

"One Broken Heart for Sale" and "They Remind Me Too Much of You" would be released ahead of time on January 29 as a single to promote both the album and the film. "Broken Heart" just missed the top ten, peaking at number 11 on the Billboard Hot 100, with the B-side charting independently at number 53. It became a gold record. Truncated with a verse excised to a very short length of 1:35, "One Broken Heart For Sale" was the first RCA single of Presley's career that did not make the top five, excluding "Shake Rattle and Roll" which did not chart at all after being released on August 31, 1956, simultaneously with Presley's debut album divided up into six singles.

Originally a deluxe-priced gatefold sleeve album was planned, but with only 21 minutes of music and the relative failure of "One Broken Heart For Sale" the idea was abandoned.

Although promoted as a full album at the time of its release, its very short running time actually renders it an EP under some modern charting criteria, such as that from the Official Charts Company in the UK.

== Reissues ==
In 2003 It Happened at the World's Fair was reissued on the Follow That Dream edition that contained the original album along with numerous alternate takes.

== Track listing ==
=== Original release ===
Side one
No.	Title	Writer(s)	Recording date	Length
1.	"Beyond the Bend"	Fred Wise, Ben Weisman, Dolores Fuller	September 22, 1962	1:50
2.	"Relax"	Sid Tepper and Roy C. Bennett	August 30, 1962	2:19
3.	"Take Me to the Fair"	Sid Tepper and Roy C. Bennett	September 22, 1962	1:34
4.	"They Remind Me Too Much of You"	Don Robertson	September 22, 1962	2:30
5.	"One Broken Heart for Sale"	Otis Blackwell and Winfield Scott	September 22, 1962	1:45

Side two
No.	Title	Writer(s)	Recording date	Length
1.	"I'm Falling in Love Tonight"	Don Robertson	September 22, 1962	1:39
2.	"Cotton Candy Land"	Ruth Batchelor and Bob Roberts	September 22, 1962	1:33
3.	"A World of Our Own"	Bill Giant, Bernie Baum, Florence Kaye	September 22, 1962	2:14
4.	"How Would You Like to Be?"	Ben Raleigh, Mark Barkan	September 22, 1962	3:26
5.	"Happy Ending"	Ben Weisman and Sid Wayne	August 30, 1962	2:08

=== 2003 Follow That Dream reissue ===
No.	Title	Length
1.	"Beyond the Bend"	1:50
2.	"Relax"	2:21
3.	"Take Me to the Fair"	1:34
4.	"They Remind Me Too Much of You"	2:31
5.	"One Broken Heart for Sale"	1:38
6.	"I'm Falling in Love Tonight"	1:40
7.	"Cotton Candy Land"	1:36
8.	"A World of Our Own"	2:14
9.	"How Would You Like to Be"	3:27
10.	"Happy Ending"	2:09
11.	"One Broken Heart for Sale" (takes 2,3,1)	4:12
12.	"They Remind Me Too Much of You" (take 1)	2:34
13.	"I'm Falling in Love Tonight" (take 1,4)	3:16
14.	"Beyond The Bend" (take 1,2)	3:32
15.	"Cotton Candy Land" (take 1,2,4)	2:35
16.	"How Would You Like To Be" (take 2)	3:33
17.	"They Remind Me Too Much of You" (take 4)	2:30
18.	"Beyond the Bend" (take 3)	1:58
19.	"Take Me to the Fair" (takes 4,5,6,7)	3:54
20.	"I'm Falling in Love Tonight" (take 6)	1:56
21.	"They Remind Me Too Much Of You" (take 6,7)	2:44
22.	"Relax" (takes 5,6,7)	2:50
23.	"Happy Ending" (takes 4,5,6)	3:35
24.	"Take Me to the Fair" (August master-from acetate)	1:32

== Personnel ==
- Elvis Presley – vocals
- The Jordanaires – backing vocals on "Relax" and "Happy Ending”
- The Mello Men – backing vocals except "Relax" and "Happy Ending”
- Clifford Scott – saxophone
- Scotty Moore – rhythm guitar
- Billy Strange – lead guitar, overdubbed ukulele on "Take Me to the Fair"
- Tiny Timbrell – acoustic guitar
- Dudley Brooks – piano, organ
- Don Robertson – piano, organ
- Ray Seigel – double bass
- D. J. Fontana – drums
- Frank Carlson – drums
