= ELV1S: 30 No. 1 Hits =

Elvis: 30 #1 Hits

Greatest hits album by Elvis Presley
- Released: September 24, 2002; February 18, 2022 (expanded edition)
- Recorded: January 10, 1956 – October 29, 1976
- Genre: Rock and roll
- Length: 78:19
- Label: RCA
- Producer: David Bendeth
- Compilers: Ernst Mikael Jørgensen; Roger Semon

Elvis Presley chronology
Elvis Presley: Live Musicbank (2002)	Elvis: 30 #1 Hits (2002)	Elvis: 2nd to None (2003)

Singles from ELVIS: 30 #1 Hits
- 1. "A Little Less Conversation" Released: June 25, 2002; 2. "Burning Love" Released: September 13, 2002

Elvis: 30 #1 Hits (stylised as ELV1S: 30 #1 HITS) is a greatest hits collection of songs by American rock and roll singer Elvis Presley. It was released by RCA Records on September 24, 2002. It is the first Elvis Presley album to feature the remix of "A Little Less Conversation" by JXL that was released earlier in the year and reached No. 1 in the UK and Australia, and went on to become a number-one hit in over 20 countries.

A companion album, 2nd to None, was released the next year. By 2003, the album had received certifications in more than 15 regions and had sold millions of copies worldwide. Its most recent certification, a 6× Platinum award, for US sales in excess of six million copies, was announced by the RIAA on March 8, 2018.

== Compilation, production and releases ==
Elvis: 30 #1 Hits was compiled by Ernst Mikael Jørgensen and Roger Semon using chart data from the pop singles charts in Billboard, Cashbox, New Musical Express, and Record Retailer. Not all of Presley's number ones are included as it is only a one-disc set. It was part of a massive campaign by RCA and BMG to celebrate Elvis on the 25th anniversary of his death.

The compilation was produced and mixed in stereo and 5.1 by David Bendeth with remastering by Ted Jensen on the first thirteen songs (the mono recordings) and George Marino on the last sixteen songs. The songs were engineered by Ray Bardani, and were transferred from master tapes by Brent Spear. The 18 recordings recorded in stereo (1960 and later) were digitally remixed from the original multitrack recordings.

In 2003, it became the first and, so far, only Elvis album to be issued in the newly created DVD audio-only disc format. The stereo tracks (1960 and later) were remixed into 5.1 surround sound for the first time and the 13 tracks recorded in mono (before 1960) were remastered and presented in a simulated 5.1 format. The songs were presented in reverse order, with "A Little Less Conversation" as track 1, and "Heartbreak Hotel" as track 31. There are also bonus tracks which are sections of three songs ("It's Now or Never", "Crying in the Chapel", and "Burning Love"), giving an A:B comparison of the original master and the remaster. A 2003 reissue of the album featured a bonus disc with outtakes and rehearsals of several songs. A Wal-Mart release had a bonus disc with Presley's post-army interview, while a Japanese release had a bonus disc with three versions of "A Little Less Conversation".

== Release and reception ==
=== Commercial reception ===
The album opened at number one in 17 territories around the world, taking the top spot in countries including the US, the UK, Canada, France, Australia and Brazil and shipped 4.7 million units worldwide in its first week. In its first week of release, 1.2 million units were shipped in Europe: 300,000 units in the UK (where 115,000 were sold the first week) and more than 200,000 units were shipped in Germany, France and Spain. In Australia it shipped 150,000 units the first week.

The album debuted at number one on the Billboard 200 the week of October 12, 2002 with more than 500,000 copies sold according to Nielsen SoundScan. It was the largest sum the chart had seen since Dixie Chicks bowed five weeks ago with 780,000 units, it also was the largest sales week for an archival album since The Beatles' 1. By October, 2003 the album had sold 3,000,000 units in the United States according to Nielsen SoundScan. The album was Presley's first album to debut at No. 1 on the Billboard 200 and was his first number one since 1973. The album helped Elvis to have the longest span of number one albums on the Billboard 200. The album remained on the chart for one hundred and twelve weeks. It also topped the Top Country Albums chart. It was certified six times platinum by the RIAA on March 8, 2018, denoting shipments of six millions.

In the United Kingdom the album debuted at number one on October 5, 2002, with 115,000 copies sold, it stayed at the top of the chart for two weeks and remained in the top 100 for 125 weeks. It was certified seven times platinum by the BPI in 2023, denoting shipments of 2,100,000 units.

=== Critical reception ===
Professional ratings
Review scores
Source	Rating
AllMusic	4.5/5 stars
Christgau’s Consumer Guide	A+
Encyclopedia of Popular Music	5/5 stars
Entertainment Weekly	A−
The Guardian	5/5 stars
Q	5/5 stars
Rolling Stone	5/5 stars

ELV1S: 30 #1 Hits received mostly favorable reviews from music critics. Stephen Thomas Erlewine of AllMusic gave the album a mostly positive review, but wrote that it still lacked a lot of good material and that several factors were working against it, such as the number of hits Elvis had and the songs that did not make it to No. 1. David Browne of Entertainment Weekly felt that the album did succeed in its purpose, but not all of the songs on the collection had enough "quality". Darryl Sterdan of Jam! CANOE predicted that the album would not do as well as the Beatles' 1 because almost all of the songs can be found on other collections and it is missing several definitive songs. Robert Christgau gave the album his highest rating out of all of Presley's albums that he has reviewed and felt that the album showed that Presley's life was "a continuous whole". Parke Puterbaugh, in his Rolling Stone review of the album, gave the album five out of five stars and felt that the recordings had improved sound quality.

=== The Killers logo ===
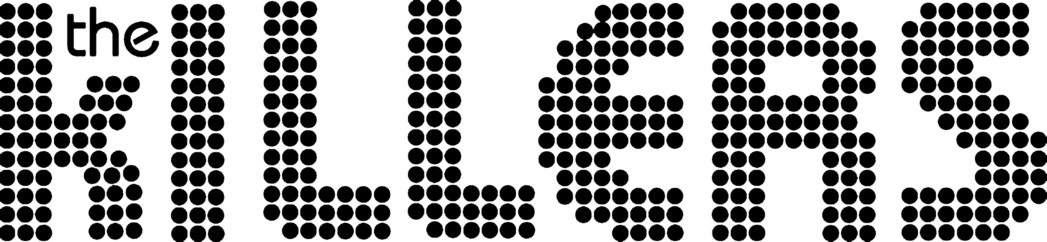
The Killers' logo, inspired by the album artwork on Elvis: 30 No. 1 Hits

Upon noticing the album's artwork in a Virgin Megastore in Las Vegas in 2002, Brandon Flowers was inspired to use a marquee sign motif as the logo for his new band, the Killers. The band hired their drummer's roommate's girlfriend to design their logo, and it has been used on the band's branding, releases, promotional materials, and merchandise ever since.

== Track listing ==
No.	Title	Writer(s)	Length
1.	"Heartbreak Hotel"	Mae Axton, Tommy Durden, Elvis Presley	2:08
2.	"Don't Be Cruel"	Otis Blackwell, Presley	2:04
3.	"Hound Dog"	Jerry Leiber, Mike Stoller	2:16
4.	"Love Me Tender"	Vera Matson, Presley	2:45
5.	"Too Much"	Lee Rosenberg, Bernard Weinman	2:33
6.	"All Shook Up"	Blackwell, Presley	2:00
7.	"(Let Me Be Your) Teddy Bear"	Kal Mann, Bernie Lowe	1:48
8.	"Jailhouse Rock"	Leiber, Stoller	2:35
9.	"Don't"	Leiber, Stoller	2:49
10.	"Hard Headed Woman"	Claude Demetrius	1:56
11.	"One Night"	Dave Bartholomew, Pearl King, Anita Steinman	2:33
12.	"(Now and Then There's) A Fool Such as I"	Bill Trader	2:40
13.	"A Big Hunk o' Love"	Aaron Schroeder, Sidney Wyche	2:12
14.	"Stuck on You"	Aaron Schroeder, John Leslie McFarland	2:21
15.	"It's Now or Never"	Eduardo Di Capua, Wally Gold, Schroeder	3:15
16.	"Are You Lonesome Tonight?"	Lou Handman, Roy Turk	3:06
17.	"Wooden Heart"	Bert Kaempfert, Kay Twomey, Ben Weisman, Fred Wise	1:58
18.	"Surrender"	Ernesto De Curtis, Doc Pomus, Mort Shuman	1:51
19.	"(Marie's the Name) His Latest Flame"	Pomus, Shuman	2:10
20.	"Can't Help Falling in Love"	Luigi Creatore, Hugo Peretti, George David Weiss	3:01
21.	"Good Luck Charm"	Gold, Schroeder	2:26
22.	"She's Not You"	Leiber, Pomus, Stoller	2:08
23.	"Return to Sender"	Blackwell, Winfield Scott	2:09
24.	"(You're the) Devil in Disguise"	Bernie Baum, Bill Giant, Florence Kaye	2:23
25.	"Crying in the Chapel"	Artie Glenn	2:23
26.	"In the Ghetto"	Mac Davis	2:45
27.	"Suspicious Minds"	Mark James	4:29
28.	"The Wonder of You"	Baker Knight	2:35
29.	"Burning Love"	Dennis Linde	2:50
30.	"Way Down"	Layng Martine Jr.	2:37
31.	"A Little Less Conversation" (JXL Radio Edit Remix)	Davis, Billy Strange	3:33

=== Limited edition versions ===
==== 2003 deluxe bonus disc ====
1. "Heartbreak Hotel" (rehearsal)
2. "All Shook Up" (rehearsal)
3. "Teddy Bear, Don't Be Cruel" (rehearsal)
4. "A Big Hunk o'Love" (take 2)
5. "Stuck on You" (take 1)
6. "It's Now or Never" (takes 2 & 3)
7. "Surrender" (take 2)
8. "(Marie's the Name) His Latest Flame" (rehearsal & take 2)
9. "She's Not You" (take 2 & wp take 4)
10. "(You're the) Devil in Disguise" (take 2 & 3)
11. "In the Ghetto" (take 1)
12. "Burning Love" (take 2)
13. "Way Down" (take 2)
14. "In the Ghetto" (vocal only outtake)
15. "A Little Less Conversation" (JXL 12" Extended Remix)

==== WalMart bonus disc ====
1. The Elvis Post Army Interview

==== Japan bonus disc ====
1. "A Little Less Conversation" (Original)
2. "A Little Less Conversation" (JXL 12" Extended Remix)
3. "A Little Less Conversation - JXL Mix" (Video) (CD-rom content)

==== 2022 Expanded Edition ====
1. "That's All Right"
2. "Blue Suede Shoes"
3. "Little Sister"
4. "Bossa Nova Baby"
5. "Viva Las Vegas"
6. "If I Can Dream"
7. "Kentucky Rain"
8. "Always on My Mind"
9. "Unchained Melody" (Live at Ann Arbor, MI)

== Charts ==
=== Weekly charts ===
Weekly chart performance for ELV1S: 30 No. 1 Hits
Chart (2002)	Peak position
Australian Albums (ARIA)	1
Austrian Albums (Ö3 Austria)	1
Belgian Albums (Ultratop Flanders)	1
Belgian Albums (Ultratop Wallonia)	1
Canadian Albums (Billboard)	1
Danish Albums (Hitlisten)	1
Dutch Albums (Album Top 100)	1
Finnish Albums (Suomen virallinen lista)	1
French Albums (SNEP)	1
German Albums (Offizielle Top 100)	3
Hungarian Albums (MAHASZ)	3
Irish Albums (IRMA)	1
Italian Albums (FIMI)	2
Japanese Albums (Oricon)	10
New Zealand Albums (RMNZ)	1
Norwegian Albums (VG-lista)	3
Polish Albums (OLiS)	7
Singaporean Albums (RIAS)	2
Spanish Albums (PROMUSICAE)	1
Swedish Albums (Sverigetopplistan)	1
Swiss Albums (Schweizer Hitparade)	1
UK Albums (Official Charts)	1
US Billboard 200	1
US Top Country Albums (Billboard)	1
Chart (2007)	Peak position
French Albums (SNEP)	65
Chart (2018–19)	Peak position
US Top Rock Albums (Billboard)	30

=== Year-end charts ===
2002 year-end chart performance for ELV1S: 30 No. 1 Hits
Chart (2002)	Position
Argentinian Albums (CAPIF)	15
Australian Albums (ARIA)	9
Austrian Albums (Ö3 Austria)	8
Belgian Albums (Ultratop Flanders)	17
Belgian Albums (Ultratop Wallonia)	30
Canadian Albums (Nielsen SoundScan)	5
Canadian Country Albums (Nielsen SoundScan)	2
Dutch Albums (Album Top 100)	23
German Albums (Offizielle Top 100)	24
Irish Albums (IRMA)	11
New Zealand Albums (RMNZ)	41
Swedish Albums (Sverigetopplistan)	6
Swiss Albums (Schweizer Hitparade)	7
UK Albums (OCC)	9
US Billboard 200	36
US Top Country Albums (Billboard)	6
Worldwide Albums (IFPI)	3

2003 year-end chart performance for ELV1S: 30 No. 1 Hits
Chart (2003)	Position
Australian Albums (ARIA)	26
Austrian Albums (Ö3 Austria)	66
Dutch Albums (Album Top 100)	1
Swedish Albums (Sverigetopplistan)	51
UK Albums (OCC)	85
US Billboard 200	35
US Top Country Albums (Billboard)	6

2004 year-end chart performance for ELV1S: 30 No. 1 Hits
Chart (2004)	Position
UK Albums (OCC)	170
US Billboard 200	181
US Top Country Albums (Billboard)	33

2005 year-end chart performance for ELV1S: 30 No. 1 Hits
Chart (2005)	Position
UK Albums (OCC)	123

2007 year-end chart performance for ELV1S: 30 No. 1 Hits
Chart (2007)	Position
UK Albums (OCC)	175

2017 year-end chart performance for ELV1S: 30 No. 1 Hits
Chart (2017)	Position
US Top Country Albums (Billboard)	78

2018 year-end chart performance for ELV1S: 30 No. 1 Hits
Chart (2018)	Position
US Top Country Albums (Billboard)	53
US Top Rock Albums (Billboard)	91

2021 year-end chart performance for ELV1S: 30 No. 1 Hits
Chart (2021)	Position
US Top Country Albums (Billboard)	59
US Top Rock Albums (Billboard)	62

2022 year-end chart performance for ELV1S: 30 No. 1 Hits
Chart (2022)	Position
UK Albums (OCC)	28
US Billboard 200	182
US Top Country Albums (Billboard)	14
US Top Rock Albums (Billboard)	22

2023 year-end chart performance for ELV1S: 30 No. 1 Hits
Chart (2023)	Position
UK Albums (OCC)	38
US Billboard 200	182
US Top Country Albums (Billboard)	34
US Top Rock Albums (Billboard)	36

2024 year-end chart performance for ELV1S: 30 No. 1 Hits
Chart (2024)	Position
UK Albums (OCC)	45
US Billboard 200	166
US Top Country Albums (Billboard)	31

2025 year-end chart performance for ELV1S: 30 No. 1 Hits
Chart (2025)	Position
UK Albums (OCC)	56
US Top Country Albums (Billboard)	63

=== Decade-end chart ===
Decade-end chart performance for ELV1S: 30 No. 1 Hits
Chart (2000–2009)	Position
Australian Albums (ARIA)	70

|}

== Certifications and sales ==
Certifications for ELV1S: 30 No. 1 Hits
Region	Certification	Certified units/sales
Argentina (CAPIF)	2× Platinum	80,000^{^}
Australia (ARIA)	7× Platinum	490,000^{^}
Austria (IFPI Austria)	2× Platinum	60,000^{*}
Belgium (BRMA)	Platinum	50,000^{*}
Brazil (Pro-Música Brasil)	Platinum	250,000
Canada (Music Canada)	5× Platinum	500,000^{^}
Denmark (IFPI Danmark)	Platinum	50,000^{^}
Finland (Musiikkituottajat)	2× Platinum	90,779
France (SNEP)	2× Gold	200,000^{*}
Germany (BVMI)	3× Gold	450,000^{^}
Hungary (MAHASZ)	Gold	10,000^{^}
Italy (FIMI) sales since 2009	Platinum	50,000^{‡}
Japan (RIAJ)	Platinum	200,000^{^}
Mexico (AMPROFON)	Gold	75,000^{^}
Netherlands (NVPI)	Platinum	80,000^{^}
New Zealand (RMNZ)	3× Platinum	45,000^{^}
Norway (IFPI Norway)	Platinum	40,000^{*}
Poland (ZPAV)	Platinum	40,000^{*}
Singapore	—	51,225
South Korea	—	49,483
Spain (Promusicae)	Platinum	100,000^{^}
Sweden (GLF)	2× Platinum	120,000^{^}
Switzerland (IFPI Switzerland)	2× Platinum	80,000^{^}
United Kingdom (BPI)	8× Platinum	2,400,000^{‡}
United States (RIAA)	6× Platinum	6,000,000^{‡}
Summaries
Europe (IFPI)	3× Platinum	3,000,000^{*}
^{*} Sales figures based on certification alone.^{^} Shipments figures based on certification alone.^{‡} Sales+streaming figures based on certification alone.
