= They Remind Me Too Much of You =

Single by Elvis Presley

from the album It Happened at the World's Fair
- A-side: "One Broken Heart for Sale"
- Released: 1963
- Genre: Easy listening
- Length: 2:30
- Label: RCA Victor
- Songwriter: Don Robertson

Elvis Presley singles chronology
"Return to Sender" / "Where Do You Come From" (1962)	"They Remind Me Too Much of You" / "One Broken Heart for Sale" (1963)	"(You're the) Devil in Disguise" / "Please Don't Drag That String Around" (1963)

"They Remind Me Too Much of You" is a song written by Don Robertson and originally recorded by Elvis Presley for the 1963 MGM motion picture It Happened at the World's Fair. In January 1963, the song was released (together with "One Broken Heart for Sale") as an advanced single from the movie. "One Broken Heart for Sale" reached number 11 on the Billboard Hot 100, and "They Remind Me Too Much of You" reached number 53.

== Composition ==
The song was written by Don Robertson. Musically, it is a ballad.

== Recording ==
Elvis Presley recorded the song for the MGM film It Happened at the World's Fair on September 22, 1962, at Radio Recorders in Hollywood, California. The recording sessions featured Scotty Moore, Tiny Timbrell and Billy Strange on guitar, Ray Siegel on bass, D.J. Fontana and Frank Carlson on drums, Don Robertson on piano, Dudley Brooks on organ, Clifford Scott on saxophone and clarinet. Additional vocals were provided by the Mello Men.

"One Broken Heart for Sale", coupled with "They Remind Me Too Much of You", was released as an advance single from the movie on January 29, 1963. The single was a relative failure — according to Elvis Presley's official website, it was "the first regularly scheduled Elvis single not to reach the Top 10" in the United States — which prompted RCA to scale back the packaging and retail price of the accompanying soundtrack album, whose sales would be only "little more than half of those for Girls! Girls! Girls!".

== Track listing ==
7" single (RCA victor 47-8134, 1963)
No.	Title	Length
1.	"One Broken Heart for Sale"	1:34
2.	"They Remind Me Too Much of You"	2:30

== Charts ==
Chart (1963)	Peak position
US Billboard Hot 100	53
