= Elvis for Everyone! =

Compilation album by Elvis Presley
- Released: August 10, 1965
- Recorded: September 1954 to January 1964
- Studios: Sun (Memphis); Radio Recorders (Hollywood); RCA Studio B (Nashville)
- Genres: Pop, rock and roll, country
- Length: 23:58
- Label: RCA Victor
- Producers: Sam Phillips, Steve Sholes, Chet Atkins, Elvis Presley, Urban Thielmann, Hans Salter, George Stoll

Elvis Presley chronology
Tickle Me (1965)	Elvis for Everyone! (1965)	Harum Scarum (1965)

Professional ratings
Review scores
Source	Rating
Allmusic	2.5/5 stars
Record Mirror	4/5 stars

Elvis for Everyone! is the eighth studio album by American singer and musician Elvis Presley, issued by RCA Victor in mono and stereo, LPM/LSP 3450, on August 10, 1965. Recording sessions took place over a ten-year span at Sun Studio in Memphis, RCA Studio B in Nashville, Tennessee, and Radio Recorders in Hollywood, California. It peaked at number 10 on the Top Pop Albums chart.

== Background ==
Sessions in late May 1963 failed to coalesce into his fifth studio album of the 1960s, and by 1965 Presley's musical output had been focused exclusively on his movie career and soundtrack output. He had not released a proper studio album since Pot Luck in June 1962, although seven non-movie singles had been issued since (though several of them had featured recording session outtakes dating back as early as 1958). RCA Victor invented the concept of an "Anniversary Album" to celebrate Presley's tenth year with the label, which became Elvis For Everyone. The album's cover depicts Presley standing next to the RCA Victor trademark Nipper the dog, sitting atop a cash register. Since May 1963, Presley had only made one non-movie session in January 1964 that yielded a mere three tracks, two of which had already been issued as sides for singles. Bereft of new material, RCA Victor assembled this album from unused tracks going back to the Sun Records years, from sessions for both soundtracks and regular commercial releases. Possibly owing to its assembly from scraps and rejects, although it made the top ten on the LP chart, it was the first Presley album to sell fewer than 300,000 copies during the decade, but later would be certified Gold in the U.S. by the RIAA.

== Content ==
Of the tracks on Elvis for Everyone! only "Summer Kisses, Winter Tears", recorded for but not used in the film Flaming Star, had previously been issued, on the extended play single Elvis by Request: Flaming Star and 3 Other Great Songs. Several tracks had appeared on film, but had not been issued on record before. "In My Way" had appeared in the 1961 film Wild in the Country, "Sound Advice" in the 1962 film Follow That Dream, and the traditional Neapolitan ballad "Santa Lucia" in the 1964 outing Viva Las Vegas. The remaining eight tracks had been unissued in any form. The Sun ballad "Tomorrow Night" had overdubs added for release on this album; it would not be officially issued in its original form for another two decades with the compilation Reconsider Baby in 1985.

RCA had intended to include the unreleased Sun Records track "Tennessee Saturday Night", but withdrew it from the album and replaced it with "Tomorrow Night". Neither has reference to a Presley Sun recording with this title ever been mentioned in any other source, nor has a Presley Sun recording with this title ever been discovered, although a song entitled "Tennessee Saturday Night" was slated for Loving You but not recorded. Goldmine Magazine published what appeared to be an acetate of the Sun Recording, in the early 1990s. A live version was heard on YouTube in the 2000s, 9 seconds long, believed to be from the Louisiana Hayride radio show.

In its format as a compilation of mostly unissued leftovers from various sessions, and given its rather short running time, this album anticipated the Presley budget releases with a similar concept that would appear during the late 1960s and early 1970s on the low priced RCA Camden label. RCA opted not to include it as part of its reissue program, appending its songs as bonus tracks to other albums as appropriate, with the overdubbed version of "Tomorrow Night" being ultimately replaced by the original Sun Records master version in general circulation.

== Reissues ==
In 2014 Elvis for Everyone was reissued on the Follow That Dream label in a special 2-disc edition that contained the original album tracks along with numerous alternate takes from other albums and singles.

== Track listing ==
=== Original release ===
Side one
No.	Title	Writer(s)	Recording date	Length
1.	"Your Cheatin' Heart"	Hank Williams	February 1, 1958	2:24
2.	"Summer Kisses, Winter Tears" (unused song from Flaming Star, previously released on Elvis by Request: Flaming Star and 3 Other Great Songs)	Fred Wise, Ben Weisman, Jack Lloyd	August 8, 1960	2:17
3.	"Finders Keepers, Losers Weepers"	Dory Jones, Ollie Jones	May 26, 1963	1:47
4.	"In My Way" (from Wild in the Country)	Fred Wise, Ben Weisman	November 7, 1960	1:19
5.	"Tomorrow Night"	Sam Coslow, Wilhelm Grosz	September 10, 1954	2:58
6.	"Memphis, Tennessee"	Chuck Berry	January 12, 1964	2:08

Side two
No.	Title	Writer(s)	Recording date	Length
1.	"For the Millionth and the Last Time"	Roy C. Bennett, Sid Tepper	October 15, 1961	2:05
2.	"Forget Me Never" (Unused song from Wild in the Country)	Fred Wise, Ben Weisman	November 7, 1960	1:35
3.	"Sound Advice" (from Follow That Dream)	Bernie Baum, Bill Giant, Florence Kaye	July 2, 1961	1:45
4.	"Santa Lucia" (from Viva Las Vegas)	Traditional; arranged by Elvis Presley	July 10, 1963	1:11
5.	"I Met Her Today"	Hal Blair, Don Robertson	October 15, 1961	2:42
6.	"When It Rains, It Really Pours"	William R. Emerson	February 24, 1957	1:47

=== 2014 Follow That Dream CD reissue ===
The original album
No.	Title	Length
1.	"Your Cheatin’ Heart"
2.	"Summer Kisses, Winter Tears"
3.	"Finders Keepers, Losers Weepers"
4.	"In My Way"
5.	"Tomorrow Night"
6.	"Memphis, Tennessee"
7.	"For The Millionth And The Last Time"
8.	"Forget Me Never"
9.	"Sound Advice"
10.	"Santa Lucia"
11.	"I Met Her Today"
12.	"When It Rains, It Really Pours"

The optional masters
No.	Title	Length
13.	"Flaming Star"
14.	"Wild In The Country" (U.K. stereo LP version)
15.	"Lonely Man" (unused song from Wild in the Country)
16.	"Mama" (Unused song from Girls! Girls! Girls!)
17.	"Plantation Rock" (Unused song from Girls! Girls! Girls!)
18.	"Night Life" (Unused song from Viva Las Vegas)
19.	"Do The Vega" (Unused song from Viva Las Vegas)
20.	"Yellow Rose Of Texas" / "The Eyes Of Texas" (medley from Viva Las Vegas)
21.	"What Now, What Next, Where To"
22.	"Western Union"
23.	"Blue River"
24.	"Tell Me Why"

The outtakes (includes additional tracks from Blue Hawaii, Fun in Acapulco and other films)
No.	Title	Length
1.	"For The Millionth And The Last Time" (take 2)
2.	"Lonely Man" (take 9)
3.	"I Slipped, I Stumbled, I Fell" (take 10)
4.	"No More" (take 9)
5.	"Slicin’ Sand" (take 10)
6.	"I’m Not The Marrying Kind" (splice of takes 5 & 6)
7.	"For The Millionth And The Last Time" (take 6)
8.	"I Met Her Today" (take 7)
9.	"King Of The Whole Wide World" (take 6)
10.	"Home Is Where The Heart Is" (take 12)
11.	"Riding The Rainbow" (take 6)
12.	"This Is Living" (take 8)
13.	"Something Blue" (takes 5 & 6)
14.	"Gonna Get Back Home Somehow" (take 6)
15.	"I Feel That I’ve Known You Forever" (take 2)
16.	"Fountain Of Love" (take 6)
17.	"Happy Ending" (take 9)
18.	"I’m Falling In Love Tonight" (take 5)
19.	"How Would You Like To Be" (take 1)
20.	"Bossa Nova Baby" (takes 4 & 5)	2:34
21.	"I Think I’m Gonna Like It Here" (remake take 15)
22.	"Vino, Dinero Y Amor" (take 1)
23.	"The Bullfighter Was A Lady" (remake take 10)

== Personnel ==
- Elvis Presley – vocals, guitar
- Scotty Moore – rhythm guitar, lead guitar on "Your Cheatin' Heart", "Tomorrow Night" and "When It Rains, It Really Pours"
- Tiny Timbrell – guitar
- Howard Roberts – guitar on “Summer Kisses, Winter Tears”
- Hank Garland – guitar on “Sound Advice”
- Neal Matthews Jr. – guitar
- Chet Atkins – overdubbed lead guitar on "Tomorrow Night"
- Harold Bradley – guitar
- Grady Martin – lead guitar on "Memphis, Tennessee"
- Billy Strange – lead guitar on "Santa Lucia"
- Jerry Kennedy – lead guitar on "Finders Keepers, Losers Weepers"
- Dudley Brooks – piano
- Floyd Cramer – piano
- Jimmie Haskell – accordion
- Gordon Stoker – accordion
- Bill Black – double bass on "Your Cheatin' Heart", "Tomorrow Night" and "When It Rains, It Really Pours"
- Meyer Rubin – double bass
- Bob Moore – double bass
- D. J. Fontana – drums
- Bernie Mattinson – drums
- Buddy Harman – drums
- Boots Randolph – saxophone, clarinet
- The Jordanaires – backing vocals
- Millie Kirkham – backing vocals
- The Anita Kerr Singers – backing vocals on "Tomorrow Night"

== Charts ==
Album

Year	Chart	Position
1965	Billboard Pop Albums	10
