= A Tribute to the Great Nat King Cole =

Studio album by Marvin Gaye
- Released: November 1, 1965
- Recorded: 1965
- Genre: Vocal jazz; R&B
- Length: 35:53
- Label: Tamla
- Producer: Hal Davis; Marc Gordon; Harvey Fuqua

Marvin Gaye chronology
How Sweet It Is to Be Loved by You (1965)	A Tribute to the Great Nat King Cole (1965)	Moods of Marvin Gaye (1966)

A Tribute to the Great Nat King Cole is the sixth studio album by Marvin Gaye, released on the Tamla (Motown) label on November 1, 1965. It is a tribute album, dedicated to his idol, late jazz performer Nat "King" Cole, who had died of lung cancer earlier in the year.

An AllMusic writer said the album was "a fine album that got lost after its release". Marvin was a vocal admirer of Nat King Cole and told interviewers Cole's vocals and performing style influenced his.

Professional ratings
Review scores
Source	Rating
AllMusic	3/5 stars
Record Mirror	4/5 stars

== Track listing ==
No.	Title	Writer(s)	Length
1.	"Nature Boy"	Eden Ahbez	2:49
2.	"Ramblin' Rose"	Joe Sherman, Noel Sherman	2:50
3.	"Too Young"	Sylvia Dee, Sidney Lippman	3:47
4.	"Pretend"	Cliff Parman, Frank Lavere, Lew Douglas	2:53
5.	"Straighten Up and Fly Right"	Nat King Cole, Irving Mills	2:22
6.	"Mona Lisa"	Ray Evans, Jay Livingston	3:01
7.	"Unforgettable"	Irving Gordon	3:40
8.	"To The Ends Of The Earth"	Joe Sherman, Noel Sherman	2:18
9.	"Sweet Lorraine"	Cliff Burwell, Mitchell Parish	2:47
10.	"It's Only a Paper Moon"	Harold Arlen, E.Y. "Yip" Harburg, Billy Rose	2:25
11.	"Send for Me"	Ollie Jones	2:57
12.	"Calypso Blues"	Don George, Nat King Cole	4:04

== Personnel ==
- Marvin Gaye - vocals, possible piano and congas
- The Funk Brothers - instrumentation
