= Where Do You Come From =

Single by Elvis Presley

from the album Girls! Girls! Girls!
- A-side: "Return to Sender"
- Released: October 1962
- Length: 2:05
- Label: RCA Victor
- Songwriters: Ruth Batchelor; Bob Roberts

Elvis Presley singles chronology
"King of the Whole Wide World" / "Home Is Where the Heart Is" (1962)	"Return to Sender" / "Where Do You Come From" (1962)	"One Broken Heart for Sale" / "They Remind Me Too Much of You" (1963)

"Where Do You Come From" is a song first recorded by Elvis Presley as part of the soundtrack for his 1962 motion picture Girls! Girls! Girls!. It was subsequently rejected for use in the motion picture and did not appear in the film, but was included on its soundtrack album Girls! Girls! Girls!.

== History ==
=== Writing ===
The song was published by Elvis Presley Music, Inc. It was written by Ruth Batchelor and Bob Roberts.

=== Recording ===
Elvis Presley recorded "Where Do You Come From" on March 27, 1962, during his March 26–28 soundtrack recordings for the Paramount motion picture Girls! Girls! Girls! at the Radio Recorders studio in Hollywood, California.

=== Release ===
The song was released on a single as a flip side to "Return to Sender" in October 1962. "Where Do You Come From" peaked at number 99 on the Billboard Hot 100, while "Return to Sender" peaked at number 2. The title "Return to Sender" was certified Gold in the United States for selling a million copies.

== Musical style and lyrics ==
In 1962, Billboard called the song a "croon ballad". According to the book Elvis Films FAQ, it is a "slow, aching ballad" that "starts a bit like "As Long As I Have You"."

[It] intrigued the King. He swoons through this, almost hypnotizing herself. Dudley Brooks's sublime piano adds to the song's mystical air."

== Charts ==
Chart (1968)	Peak position
US Billboard Hot 100	99
