= I Got Lucky (song) =

Single by Elvis Presley

from the EP Kid Galahad
- A-side: "I Got Lucky"; "Girls! Girls! Girls!"; (Germany)
- Released: 1963
- Recorded: October 27, 1961
- Length: 1:54
- Songwriters: Fred Wise; Dolores Fuller; Ben Weisman

"I Got Lucky" is a song recorded by Elvis Presley as part of the soundtrack for his 1962 motion picture Kid Galahad. He performs it in the movie.

Its first release on record was on the soundtrack EP Kid Galahad in August 1962.

In 1963 it was also released on a single in Europe, with "Girls! Girls! Girls!" on the reverse side.

In 1971 the song was included at the title track on the low price LP I Got Lucky.

== Writing and recording history ==
The song was written by Fred Wise, Dolores Fuller, and Ben Weisman.

Presley recorded it on October 27, 1961, at RCA's Studio B in Nashville, Tennessee.

== Critical reception ==
Brian W. Fairbanks in his review of the movie Kid Galahad cites "I Got Lucky" as one of three songs (out of six songs that Elvis Presley sings in it) that are "pretty good" (the other two being "King of the Whole Wide World" and "Home is Where the Heart Is").

== Track listings ==
7" single "I Got Lucky" / "Girls! Girls! Girls!" (RCA 47–9459, Germany, 1963)

1. "I Got Lucky" (1:54)
2. "Girls! Girls! Girls!" (2:30)

7" single (RCA Victor 47g 960, Greece)

1. "Gonna Get Back Home Somehow"
2. "I Got Lucky"

== Charts ==
Chart (1962–1963)	Peak position
Belgium (Ultratop 50 Flanders)	15
Belgium (Ultratop 50 Wallonia)	50
