= Anything That's Part of You =

Single by Elvis Presley
- A-side: "Good Luck Charm"
- Released: February 27, 1962
- Recorded: October 15, 1961
- Genre: Pop
- Length: 2:04
- Label: RCA Victor
- Songwriter: Don Robertson
- Producer: Steve Sholes

Elvis Presley singles chronology
"Can't Help Falling in Love" / "Rock-A-Hula Baby" (1961)	"Good Luck Charm" / "Anything That's Part of You" (1962)	"She's Not You" / "Just Tell Her Jim Said Hello" (1962)

"Anything That's Part of You" is a 1961 song recorded by Elvis Presley, accompanied by the Jordanaires and written by Don Robertson which was a Top 40 hit in the US, reaching No. 31.

== Background ==
It was recorded by Elvis Presley on October 15, 1961, for RCA Records at RCA Studio B in Nashville, Tennessee. It was released as the B-side of the No. 1 hit "Good Luck Charm' on February 27, 1962, reaching the Top 40 in the US. The song was published by Gladys Music, Inc., Presley's publishing company.

== Other recordings ==
It has also been recorded by Bobby Solo (in German as, "Vielleicht kannst du mich jetzt versteh'n") and by Les Gants Noirs (in French as "Un soir sans toi) in 1966 and by Billy "Crash" Craddock in 1968 for Chart Records. Billy J. Kramer with The Dakotas recorded the song in 1964. In January 1965, Steve Brett And The Mavericks, a fore-runner band to Slade, featuring the future lead singer Noddy Holder on lead guitar, released the song as the B-side of their single 'Wishing' on the Columbia label in the UK. Lawrence Welk released a version in 1962 on the Young World album. Don Robertson recorded a version in 1965. In 2015, a new version by Elvis Presley was released accompanied by The Royal Philharmonic Orchestra.

== Charts ==
The single peaked at No. 6 on the Billboard Easy Listening chart, No. 31 on the Billboard Top 100, and No. 51 on the Cash Box Top 100. The first album appearance was on the RCA compilation Elvis' Golden Records Volume 3, released in September 1963.
