= Girls! Girls! Girls! (soundtrack) =

Soundtrack album by Elvis Presley
- Released: November 9, 1962
- Recorded: March 26–28, 1962; May 2 and 23, 1962
- Studio: Radio Recorders (Hollywood)
- Genres: Pop, rock and roll
- Length: 29:04
- Label: RCA Victor
- Producer: Joseph J. Lilley

Elvis Presley chronology
Kid Galahad (1962)	Girls! Girls! Girls! (1962)	It Happened at the World's Fair (1963)

Singles from Girls! Girls! Girls!
- 1. "Return to Sender" Released: October 2, 1962; 2. "Girls! Girls! Girls!" Released: 1963 (Greece); 3. "Because of Love" Released: June 1963 (Greece)

Professional ratings
Review scores
Source	Rating
Allmusic	3.5/5 stars
New Record Mirror	5/5 stars

Girls! Girls! Girls! is the fifth soundtrack album by American singer and musician Elvis Presley, released on RCA Victor Records in mono and stereo, LPM/LSP 2426, in November 1962. It accompanied the 1962 film of the same name starring Presley. Recording sessions took place at Radio Recorders in Hollywood on March 26, 27, and 28, and May 23, 1962. It peaked at number three on the Top LPs chart. It was certified Gold on August 13, 1963, by the Recording Industry Association of America.

== Content ==
As soundtrack album sales far outstripped his regular album sales (Blue Hawaii outselling Pot Luck with Elvis by ten to one) Presley found himself firmly entrenched in songs designed for a light-entertainment formula of beautiful scenery and girls galore. With this discrepancy in sales, the formula of the soundtrack music became the focus. This formula for success would prove disastrous for Presley's career. Elvis continued recording non-movie singles and was never "entrenched" in only "movie music". Popular music was on the threshold of complete renewal and change and Presley would become 'lost in Hollywood'. Yet he was the no.2 most charted act on Billboard's pop chart of the '60s.

Sixteen songs were recorded at the sessions in March, of which thirteen were used for the soundtrack album. Banished from the kingdom after running afoul of the Colonel, songs from favored writers Jerry Leiber and Mike Stoller could only be those already written for someone else, in this case the title track being a hit for The Coasters in 1961 before being adapted for the Presley film.

The tracks "Return to Sender" and "Where Do You Come From" were issued as both sides of a single in October 1962, one month before the release of the soundtrack LP. "Return to Sender" became a substantial hit for Presley, peaking at number 2 on the Billboard Hot 100, while the B-side "Where Do You Come From" peaked at only number 99 independently of the hit side.

The songs performed by Stella Stevens in the film—"Never Let Me Go", "The Nearness of You" and "Baby, Baby, Baby"—were in fact mimed to the singing voice of Gilda Maiken and have yet to be commercially released.

The track "The Walls Have Ears", also translated as "Vent hobn oyern", is a reference to a Yiddish phrase warning how "someone's always listening."

== Reissues ==
In 1993, RCA reissued the Girls! Girls! Girls album with four bonus tracks, coupled with the Kid Galahad EP on a "Double Feature" compact disc. RCA/Sony reissued the original 13 track Girls! Girls! Girls! soundtrack album on CD in 2009. Follow That Dream released an expanded version of the album in 2007, including alternate takes and songs recorded but not used for the soundtrack.

== Legacy ==
The outtake "Plantation Rock" saw a performance by actor Rob Schneider (a self-proclaimed Elvis fan) on Late Night with Conan O'Brien in 1996.

== Track listing ==
=== Original release ===
Side one
No.	Title	Writer(s)	Recording date	Length
1.	"Girls! Girls! Girls!"	Jerry Leiber and Mike Stoller	March 27, 1962	2:34
2.	"I Don't Wanna Be Tied"	Bill Giant, Bernie Baum, Florence Kaye	March 28, 1962	2:08
3.	"Where Do You Come From"	Ruth Batchelor and Bob Roberts	March 27, 1962	2:08
4.	"I Don't Want To"	Janice Torre and Fred Spielman	March 26, 1962	2:42
5.	"We'll Be Together"	Charles O'Curran and Dudley Brooks	May 23, 1962	2:17
6.	"A Boy Like Me, A Girl Like You"	Sid Tepper and Roy C. Bennett	March 27, 1962	2:20
7.	"Earth Boy"	Sid Tepper and Roy C. Bennett	March 28, 1962	2:24

Side two
No.	Title	Writer(s)	Recording date	Length
1.	"Return to Sender"	Otis Blackwell and Winfield Scott	March 27, 1962	2:09
2.	"Because of Love"	Ruth Batchelor and Bob Roberts	March 27, 1962	2:34
3.	"Thanks to the Rolling Sea"	Bill Giant, Bernie Baum, Florence Kaye	March 26, 1962	1:31
4.	"Song of the Shrimp"	Sid Tepper and Roy C. Bennett	March 27, 1962	2:21
5.	"The Walls Have Ears"	Sid Tepper and Roy C. Bennett	March 27, 1962	2:32
6.	"We're Comin' In Loaded"	Otis Blackwell and Winfield Scott	March 26, 1962	1:24

=== Follow That Dream reissue version ===
Original Soundtrack Album
No.	Title	Length
1.	"Girls! Girls! Girls!"	2:34
2.	"I Don't Wanna Be Tied"	2:08
3.	"Where Do You Come From"	2:08
4.	"I Don't Want To"	2:42
5.	"We'll Be Together"	2:17
6.	"A Boy Like Me, A Girl Like You"	2:20
7.	"Earth Boy"	2:24
8.	"Return to Sender"	2:09
9.	"Because Of Love"	2:34
10.	"Thanks to the Rolling Sea"	1:31
11.	"Song of the Shrimp"	2:21
12.	"The Walls Have Ears"	2:32
13.	"We're Coming in Loaded"	1:24

New Bonus Songs
No.	Title	Length
14.	"Mama"	1:00
15.	"Plantation Rock" (cut from film)	1:57
16.	"Dainty Little Moonbeams" / "Girls! Girls! Girls" (end title)	1:57

Outtakes
No.	Title	Length
17.	"A Boy Like Me, A Girl Like You" (takes 1,2)	4:50
18.	"Mama" (takes 1, 2, 3, 4)	3:21
19.	"Thanks to the Rolling Sea" (take 3)	1:36
20.	"Where Do You Come From" (take 13)	2:09
21.	"Earth Boy" (movie version takes 2, 4)	3:31
22.	"We'll Be Together" (takes 8,10)	3:36
23.	"Mama" (takes 5, 6, 7, 8)	4:04
24.	"I Don't Wanna Be Tied" (movie version take 8 & 10 intro)	2:26
25.	"A Boy Like Me, A Girl Like You" (takes 3, 4)	3:37
26.	"Thanks to the Rolling Sea" (take 10)	1:26
27.	"Plantation Rock" (take 17, insert)	2:30
28.	"Mama" (take 9)	1:20
29.	"Mama" (The Amigos, take 10)	2:19
30.	"Mama" (instrumental, take 3)	0:44
31.	"Mama" (1970 Let's Be Friends album version)	2:20

== Personnel ==
Partial credits from Ernst Jørgensen and Keith Flynn's examination of RCA, studio, and AFM/union paperwork.

- Elvis Presley – vocals
- The Jordanaires (Gordon Stoker, Hoyt Hawkins, Neal Matthews Jr., Ray Walker) – vocals
- The Amigos – backing vocals (on "We'll Be Together")
- Boots Randolph – saxophone, clarinet
- Scotty Moore – electric rhythm guitar
- Barney Kessel – electric lead guitar
- Tiny Timbrell – acoustic rhythm guitar
- Robert Bain – guitar (on "We'll Be Together")
- Alton Hendrickson – guitar (on "We'll Be Together")
- Dudley Brooks – piano
- Harold Brown – organ (on "Thanks to the Rolling Sea")
- Ray Seigel – double bass
- D.J. Fontana – drums
- Hal Blaine – drums, percussion
- Bernie Mattinson – drums, percussion

Production staff

- Joseph Lilley – producer
- Thorne Nogar – engineer
