= Send for Me (song) =

Single by Nat King Cole
- B-side: "My Personal Possession"
- Released: June 6, 1957
- Recorded: 14 May 1957
- Studio: Capitol (Hollywood)
- Genre: Rhythm & blues; soul
- Length: 2:38
- Label: Capitol
- Songwriter(s): Ollie Jones

Nat King Cole singles chronology
"When Rock and Roll Come to Trinidad" (1957)	"Send for Me" (1957)	"(The Song Of) Raintree County" (1957)

"Send for Me" is a song written by Ollie Jones and performed by Nat King Cole featuring the McCoy's Boys. It reached No. 1 on the U.S. R&B chart and No. 6 on the U.S. pop chart in 1957. The song was arranged by Billy May.

The single's B-side, "My Personal Possession", reached No. 21 on both the U.S. pop chart and the UK Singles Chart and featuring backing vocals by The Four Knights and was arranged by Nelson Riddle.

The song ranked No. 40 on Billboard's Year-End top 50 singles of 1957.

== Other versions ==
- Earl Grant released a version of the song on his 1958 album, The Versatile Earl Grant.
- Frankie Lymon released a version of the song on his 1958 album Rock 'N' Roll.
- Emile Ford and The Checkmates released a version of the song on his 1960 EP, Emile.
- Mark Murphy released a version of the song on his 1960 album, Mark Murphy's Hip Parade.
- Margie Day released a version of the song as the B-side to her 1961 single "Let Me Know".
- Maynard Ferguson and Chris Connor released a version of the song on their 1961 album, Two's Company.
- Julie London released a version of the song on her 1961 album, Send for Me.
- Gene McDaniels released a version of the song on his 1961 album, 100 Lbs. of Clay!
- Paul Anka released a version of the song on his 1962 album, Paul Anka Sings His Big Big Big 15 Vol.3.
- Brook Benton released a version of the song on his 1962 album, Lie to Me - Brook Benton Singing the Blues.
- Trade Martin released a version of the song as a single in 1964, but it did not chart.
- Sammy Davis Jr. released a version of the song on his 1965 album, The Nat King Cole Songbook.
- Marvin Gaye released a version of the song on his 1965 album, A Tribute to the Great Nat King Cole.
- Lou Rawls released a version of the song as the B-side to his 1973 single "Morning Comes Around".
- The Stylistics released a version of the song on their 1976 album, Once Upon a Juke Box.
- Hank Crawford released a version of the song on his 1991 album, Portrait.
- Eddy Clearwater released a version of the song on his 1996 album, Mean Case of the Blues.
- Freddy Cole released a version of the song on his 1996 album, It's Crazy, But I'm in Love.
- Monty Alexander released a version of the song on his 2009 album, The Songs of Nat King Cole - Calypso Blues.
