= Finders Keepers, Losers Weepers =

Song by Elvis Presley

from the album Elvis for Everyone
- Released: 1965
- Songwriters: Dory Jones, Ollie Jones

"Finders Keepers, Losers Weepers" is a song written by Dory and Ollie Jones and recorded by Elvis Presley on May 26, 1963. The song was first released in 1965 on the album, Elvis for Everyone.
