= Girls Girls Girls (The Coasters song) =

1961 song written by Jerry Leiber and Mike Stoller

Single by The Coasters
- A-side: "Girls Girls Girls (part I)"
- B-side: "Girls Girls Girls (part II)"
- Released: July 1961
- Recorded: February 9, 1961
- Length: 3:58
- Label: Atco
- Songwriter: Jerry Leiber and Mike Stoller
- Producer: Jerry Leiber and Mike Stoller

The Coasters singles chronology
"Little Egypt (Ying-Yang)" (4/1961)	"Girls Girls Girls" (1961)	"Bad Blood" (10/1961)

"Girls! Girls! Girls!"

Song by Elvis Presley

from the album Girls! Girls! Girls!
- Published: November 9, 1962
- Recorded: March 27, 1962
- Studio: Radio Recorders (Hollywood)
- Length: 2:34
- Label: RCA Victor
- Songwriter: Jerry Leiber and Mike Stoller
- Producer: Steve Sholes

"Girls Girls Girls", or "Girls! Girls! Girls!", is a song written and produced by Jerry Leiber and Mike Stoller.

It was originally recorded by The Coasters, who released it as a single in July 1961. The Coasters were also the original performers of another Elvis Presley recording, "Little Egypt".

Elvis Presley recorded his version as part of the soundtrack for his 1962 motion picture of the same name. Its first LP release was on the eponymous soundtrack album in November 1962. In selected countries, it was also released on an eponymous EP.

== Writing and recording history ==
The song was written by Jerry Leiber and Mike Stoller, originally for rock and roll vocal group The Coasters. The band recorded it in the same recording session as "Little Egypt", another song Elvis would later release. Neither songs did much for the band's popularity, only reaching number 96 on the Billboard Hot 100.

Presley recorded it on Tuesday, March 27, 1962 during his March 26–28 soundtrack recordings for the Paramount movie Girls! Girls! Girls! at the Radio Recorders studio in Hollywood, California.

In 1965 the song was covered by English band The Fourmost.

== Track listings ==
=== The Coasters version ===
7" single (Atco 6024, August 1961)

- "Girls, Girls, Girls Part 1"
- "Girls, Girls, Girls Part 2"

=== Elvis Presley version ===
See Girls! Girls! Girls! (soundtrack)

== Charts ==
=== The Coasters version ===
Chart (1961)	Peak position
U.S. Billboard Hot 100	96

=== Elvis Presley version ===
Chart (1962)	Peak position
Belgium (Wallonia)	50
