= One Broken Heart for Sale =

Single by Elvis Presley

from the album It Happened at the World's Fair
- B-side: "They Remind Me Too Much of You"
- Released: January 29, 1963
- Recorded: September 22, 1962
- Studio: Radio Recorders, Hollywood
- Genre: Pop
- Length: 1:34
- Label: RCA Victor
- Songwriter: Otis Blackwell/Winfield Scott

Elvis Presley singles chronology
"Return to Sender" / "Where Do You Come From" (1962)	"One Broken Heart for Sale" / "They Remind Me Too Much of You" (1963)	"(You're the) Devil in Disguise" / "Please Don't Drag That String Around" (1963)

"One Broken Heart for Sale" is an Elvis Presley song taken from the soundtrack to the motion picture, It Happened at the World's Fair. It was released as a single by RCA Victor on January 29, 1963. "One Broken Heart for Sale" reached number 11 on the Hot 100 chart and remained on this chart for nine weeks. It was certified gold by the RIAA in 1992. It reached number 21 on the R&B chart and stayed on this chart for four weeks. In the UK, it peaked at number 12.

== Charts ==
Chart (1963)	Peak position
Belgium (Ultratop 50 Flanders)	9
Belgium (Ultratop 50 Wallonia)	50
Ireland (IRMA)	5
Norway (VG-lista)	2
UK Singles (Official Charts)	12
US Hot R&B/Hip-Hop Songs (Billboard)	21
US Billboard Hot 100	11
West Germany (GfK)	23
