= Tweedlee Dee =

Original song written and composed by Winfield Scott

"Tweedle Dee"

Single by LaVern Baker

from the album LaVern Baker
- B-side: "Tomorrow Night"
- Released: November 1954
- Recorded: 1954
- Genre: Rock and roll
- Length: 2:55
- Label: Atlantic
- Songwriter: Winfield Scott

LaVern Baker singles chronology
"I Can't Hold Out Any Longer" (1954)	"Tweedle Dee" (1954)	"Bop-Ting-a-Ling" (1955)

"Tweedlee Dee" (also "Tweedly Dee" or "Tweedle Dee") is a rhythm and blues novelty song with a Latin-influenced riff written by Winfield Scott for LaVern Baker and recorded by her at Atlantic Records' studio in New York City in 1954. It was her first hit, reaching number 4 on Billboard magazine's R&B chart and number 14 on its pop chart. It was Scott's first commercially successful song.

"Tweedle Dee"

Single by Georgia Gibbs

from the album Song Favorites of Georgia Gibbs
- B-side: "You're Wrong, All Wrong"
- Released: December 1954
- Recorded: 1954
- Genre: Traditional pop
- Length: 2:35
- Label: Mercury
- Songwriter: Winfield Scott

Georgia Gibbs singles chronology
"Mambo Baby" (1954)	"Tweedle Dee" (1954)	"Dance With Me Henry (Wallflower)" (1955)

== Background ==
The arrangement and vocal style of the song attempted to adapt a black vocal style to one that would satisfy the tastes of the white record-buying market, featuring a light tone and a frisky rhythm beat. The backing vocals are provided by Atlantic's in-house backing group at the time, The Cues (credited here as The Gliders), consisting here of first tenor Abel DeCosta, second tenor Ollie Jones (formerly of The Ravens), bass Edward Barnes, and baritone (and songwriter) Winfield Scott. Also on the session were tenor sax player Sam "The Man" Taylor and drummer Connie Kay.

== Georgia Gibbs recording ==
Baker closely approached a pop style in her recording, but a cover of the song was quickly recorded by Georgia Gibbs for Mercury Records, a major label, which had better distribution than Atlantic, an independent label. The cover version, which had the same lyrics and closely imitated the style and arrangement of the original, became a gold record for Gibbs, ruining any chance of Baker's recording becoming a pop hit. It was common at that time for major record companies to release cover versions of R&B hits aimed at the wider white audience, a practice not forbidden by United States copyright law. According to Atlantic's engineer, Tom Dowd, Mercury hired the same arranger, the same musicians and tried to hire the same engineer. Baker attempted to get her congressman to introduce legislation to prevent the copying of arrangements but was unsuccessful.

== Other cover versions ==
Numerous performances of the song have been recorded, including versions by:

- An early version of the song was recorded by Chet Atkins in 1955.
- Elvis Presley (a 1955 live performance first released commercially in the 1980s). Presley also recorded a number of Scott's compositions in the 1960s.
- Teresa Brewer in 1955 on Coral Records
- Vicki Young with Van Alexander's Orchestra for Capitol Records in 1955
- Dorothy Collins in 1955 for Audivox
- Connie Francis on Rock-n-Roll Million Sellers in 1959 for MGM
- Ike & Tina Turner
- Alma Cogan
- Bill Haley & His Comets (recorded in 1979 for Haley's final album, Everyone Can Rock and Roll).
- The Crests recorded a cover version for their 1960 album The Crests Sing All Biggies.
- Little Jimmy Osmond

== Charts (Little Jimmy Osmond version) ==
Chart (1972/73)	Position
Australia (Kent Music Report)	25
Ireland (IRMA)	6
United Kingdom (Official Charts Company)	4
United States (Billboard Hot 100)	59

== Popular culture ==
The song is heard in the films La Bamba, Uncle Buck, and The Departed.

== See also ==
- Billboard Top Rock'n'Roll Hits: 1955
