= Kenyon Hopkins =

American composer (1912–1983)

- Born: H. Kenyon Hopkins; January 15, 1912; Coffeyville, Kansas, U.S.
- Died: April 7, 1983 (aged 71) Princeton, New Jersey, U.S.
- Occupations: Composer, arranger
- Labels: ABC Paramount Records; Cadence Records; Capitol Records; Columbia Records; MGM Records; Verve Records

Kenyon Hopkins (January 15, 1912 – April 7, 1983) was an American composer who composed many film scores in a jazz idiom. He was once called "one of jazz's great composers and arrangers."

== Biography ==
=== Early life and education ===
Hopkins was born in Coffeyville, Kansas, to the marriage of Rev. Thomas John Hopkins (1871–1939) and Gertrude Conover Nevius (maiden; 1883–aft. July 6, 1967). He, with his parents and brother, Thomas Oliver Hopkins (1915–1973), lived in several towns were his father had been a clergyman who had served as pastor at (i) the First Baptist Church in Coffeyville from 1909 to 1918, (ii) the First Baptist Church in Adrian, Michigan, from 1918 to 1923, (iii) the Tenth Avenue Baptist Church in Columbus, Ohio, from 1923 to 1928, (iv) the Central Baptist Church in Wayne, Pennsylvania, from 1928 to 1936, and (v) the Prospect Hill Baptist Church in Prospect Park, Pennsylvania, from 1936 until his death in 1939.

Hopkins attended Indianola Junior High School in Columbus, then in June 1929, graduated from North High School. In the fall of 1929, he enrolled at Oberlin College where he studied theory and composition. Hopkins transferred to Temple University, where, in 1933, he earned a degree in music.

=== Postgraduate influences ===
In the mid to late 1940s, after World War II, Hopkins studied theories and the concepts of serial music – including so-called serious music – with Stefan Wolpe.

=== Career ===
In the 1930s, Hopkins arranged in New York for Andre Kostelanetz and Paul Whiteman, and for radio and theater.

Hopkins composed various orchestral works, including two symphonies, the Symphony in Two Movements and Town and County Dances for chamber orchestra, and the jazz ballet Rooms for Anna Sokolow.

He recorded several albums for ABC Paramount Records, Cadence, Capitol, and Verve during the 1960s. Many of his soundtrack recordings were released on LP, including that for the 1956 film Baby Doll, which was re-released on CD.

== Personal life and death ==
Hopkins married at least three times. He first married, in 1936, vocalist Ramona (née Estrild Raymona Myers, 1909 – 1972). They divorced around June 1943, reportedly in Mexico. On December 13, 1947, he then married a magazine writer and publicist whose first name was Florence. They divorced in 1951 in Dade County, Florida. On February 17, 1952, he married Geri Beitzel (née Geraldine Virginia Beitzel; 1924 – 1995) in Washington Township, Bergen County, New Jersey. She was a soprano and a 1945 graduate of Juilliard.

Hopkins died in Princeton, New Jersey, at the age of 71. He and his wife Geraldine had been living on their farm – the Backbone Hill Farm in Clarksburg, New Jersey (near Allentown), for 27 years.

== Discography ==
- Contrasting Colors, Capitol, 1959
- The Sound of New York, ABC Paramount, [ABC 2269 (mono) / ABCS 2269 (stereo)], recorded November 17, 21, and 27, 1958, in New York; released 1959; conducted by Hopkins (the album included the Geri Beitzel Singers)
- "Swinging Serenades", Capitol Records, [T-1236 (mono) / ST-1236 (stereo)], 1959.
- Ridin' The Rails, Capitol Records, [T-1302 (mono) / ST-1302 (stereo)], 1960
- Nightmare!!, MGM Records [E/SE 4104 (mono) / SE 4104 (stereo)], 1962
- The Yellow Canary (Music From The Motion Picture), Kenyon Hopkins and His Orchestra, Verve [V6-8548], recorded April 15 and 16, 1963, in New York; released 1963
- The Reporter: The Original Music From the CBS Television Network Series, (Columbia CL 2269 mono), 1964
- Sound Tour: France, Verve (in conjunction with Esquire Magazine) (produced by Creed Taylor), 1962

== Filmography ==
=== Film scores ===
- 1956: Baby Doll
- 1957: The Strange One
- 1957: 12 Angry Men
- 1959: The Fugitive Kind
- 1960: Wild River
- 1961: Wild in the Country
- 1961: The Hustler
- 1963: The Yellow Canary
- 1964: Lilith
- 1966: Mister Buddwing
- 1966: This Property Is Condemned
- 1967: The Borgia Stick
- 1967: Doctor, You've Got to Be Kidding!
- 1968: A Lovely Way to Die
- 1969: The Tree
- 1969: The First Time
- 1969: Downhill Racer

=== Television ===
- The Cara Williams Show ("Cara′s Theme")
- The Brady Bunch
- East Side/West Side
- Eleven Against the Ice
- Hawk
- The Odd Couple
- Mannix
- The Undersea World of Jacques Cousteau: The Water Planet, Night of the Squid.
- The Reporter
