= The Cues =

American R&B vocal group

- Also known as: The Four Students; The Rhythmakers; The Blues Kings; The Gliders; The Ivory Tones etc.
- Origin: New York City, United States
- Genres: Rhythm and blues, doo-wop, rock and roll
- Years active: 1954–1961
- Labels: Atlantic, Capitol
- Past members: Ollie Jones; Winfield Scott (Robie Kirk); Abel DeCosta; Eddie Barnes; Jimmy Breedlove; Luther Dixon; Joseph Smalls

The Cues were an American R&B vocal group, who recorded both under their group name and under various other names as backing singers for artists on Atlantic Records and other labels in the 1950s. They recorded as the Rhythmakers with Ruth Brown; as the Blues Kings with Big Joe Turner; the Gliders with LaVern Baker; and as the Ivory Tones with Ivory Joe Hunter. Independently, they also recorded as the Four Students. Researcher Marv Goldberg has claimed that "because of their unique role in the recording industry, The Cues probably participated in more hit records than any other group."

== Biography ==
The group was put together in 1954 by songwriter, pianist, arranger and music executive Jesse Stone, who wanted to establish a regular group of backing singers for the Atlantic label's records. Original members of The Cues included second tenor Ollie Jones (previously of The Ravens) and baritone Winfield Scott (also known as Robie Kirk), soon joined by first tenor Abel DeCosta (previously of The Blenders) and bass Eddie Barnes. They made their first recordings as a group for the Lamp label, a subsidiary of Aladdin Records, but also recorded the same year for Jubilee Records, and – as the Four Students – for RCA Records.

As backing singers on Atlantic Records, they recorded with LaVern Baker on "Tweedle Dee" and "Jim Dandy"; with Roy Hamilton on "Don't Let Go"; with Big Joe Turner on "Flip, Flop and Fly"; and many others. They also featured with Nat "King" Cole on many of his mid-1950s recordings on Capitol Records. They appeared on both original versions of songs, and cover versions – such as on Georgia Gibbs' cover of "Tweedle Dee". They also made many demonstration records of songs, which were then sent to record companies on the understanding that the group would provide the back-up for the final record.

By mid 1955, after adding second tenor Jimmy Breedlove, who had previously recorded as a solo singer, the group began recording in their own right on Capitol. Their first release on the label was "Burn That Candle", written by Winfield Scott, but their version was soon overtaken on the charts by a cover version by Bill Haley and His Comets. The group's most lasting success was with "Why", a song written by Jesse Stone under his regular pseudonym of Charles Calhoun, which became a local hit. The group were also still providing back-up for the Atlantic roster, and for other labels, and recorded, without Breedlove, as the Four Students for the Groove label, a subsidiary of RCA. In 1956, Scott and Barnes left the group, and were replaced by baritone Luther Dixon, and bass Joseph Smalls (previously of the Blenders).

The Cues continued to record for Capitol, but with little commercial success. From 1956, they also toured as part of Buck Ram's "Happy Tours". Breedlove left the group in 1957 for a solo career, while Winfield Scott, Ollie Jones and Luther Dixon continued as successful songwriters. Abel DeCosta ran an agency finding backing singers for new recordings, before joining a later version of The Ink Spots. The Cues effectively ceased to exist as a group in the late 1950s, but briefly reformed in 1960 to record for Herb Abramson's Jubilee Records before finally disbanding.

A compilation of the Cues' recordings, Why, was released by Bear Family Records in 2008.

Winfield Scott, also known as Robie Kirk, died on October 26, 2015, at age 94.
