= Lilith (film) =

1964 American film

- original film poster
- Directed by: Robert Rossen
- Written by: Robert Rossen
- Based on: Lilith by J. R. Salamanca
- Produced by: Robert Rossen
- Starring: Warren Beatty; Jean Seberg; Peter Fonda; Kim Hunter
- Cinematography: Eugen Schüfftan
- Edited by: Aram Avakian
- Music by: Kenyon Hopkins
- Color process: black and white
- Production company: Centaur Productions
- Distributed by: Columbia Pictures
- Release date: 19 September 1964 (New York City)
- Running time: 114 minutes
- Country: United States
- Language: English
- Box office: $1,100,000

Lilith is a 1964 American drama film written and directed by Robert Rossen starring Warren Beatty and Jean Seberg. Based on a 1961 novel by J. R. Salamanca, it was Rossen's final film.

== Plot ==
Set in a private mental institution, Chestnut Lodge in Rockville, Maryland, the film tells of a trainee occupational therapist, a troubled ex-soldier named Vincent Bruce, who is fascinated by seductive, artistic, schizophrenic patient Lilith Arthur. Lilith reminds him of his mother, who was mentally disturbed and took her own life.

Vincent is successful in helping Lilith emerge from seclusion and leave the institutional grounds for a day in the country, and later escorts her on excursions in which she is alone with him. She attempts to seduce him, and eventually Bruce tells Lilith he is in love with her. During an excursion to a carnival, he witnesses her behaving inappropriately towards a young boy. After the excursion, they sleep together and start meeting regularly. Growing increasingly jealous, Vincent follows Lilith to her meetings with Mrs. Meaghan, an older female patient, with whom she has an affair. When Stephen Evshevsky, a patient who is in love with Lilith, presents her a gift, Vincent returns it to him, suggesting that Lilith refused it. The unstable Stephen commits suicide.

Vincent tries to convince Lilith that they had conspired in driving Stephen into committing suicide, but she rejects him. Lilith revives memories of her brother's suicide, which she implies was due to her attempt to initiate an incestuous relationship with him. Later, while the camera moves ambiguously with no subject, the sounds of crashing objects and heavy breathing are heard in Lilith's room, which is then shown to be completely destroyed. Lilith is discovered sitting on the floor leaning against her bed looking upward in a catatonic state. Vincent stands in the doorway surveying the scene before exiting the building. After walking back and forth across the hospital grounds in an agitated state, Vincent approaches his superiors and asks them to help him.

== Cast ==
- Warren Beatty as Vincent Bruce
- Jean Seberg as Lilith Arthur
- Peter Fonda as Stephen Evshevsky
- Kim Hunter as Dr. Bea Brice
- Anne Meacham as Mrs. Yvonne Meaghan
- Jessica Walter as Laura
- Gene Hackman as Norman
- James Patterson as Dr. Lavrier
- Robert Reilly as Bob Clayfield

== Production ==
Produced by Rossen's Centaur Productions and financed mainly by distributor Columbia Pictures, Lilith was shot on location over a period of six weeks in a rented boarding house and the Killingsworth Taylor mansion, Long Island, and in Rockville, Maryland, where the clinic was located. One week of shooting was done in the studio. Rossen, already weakened by illness and medication when filming started, finished the film in complete exhaustion. According to Jean Seberg, this was owed in parts to Rossen's and Beatty's permanent confrontations over how to play his role.

According to Beatty biographer Peter Biskind:

Beatty made no secret of the fact that he thought Rosson was making a mess of the movie, and told him so, which enraged the director. The actor attributed some of the problem to Rossen's drinking. Finally, in frustration, Beatty intentionally mucked up some of his scenes, as he later confessed, by mumbling, so much so that he earned the nickname of "Whispering Jack Smith," after a singer popular in the 1920s and 1930s.

Lillith was Gene Hackman's second film (after 1961's Mad Dog Coll). His part consisted of only one scene, but three years later Beatty remembered him from that brief moment and cast him in what would be Hackman's breakout role of Clyde Barrow's older brother Buck in one of the landmark films of the 1960s, Bonnie and Clyde.

== Release ==
Lilith had originally been chosen by the MPAA as the official American entry to the 1964 Venice Film Festival, but was withdrawn after press reports that festival director Luigi Chiarini had disparaged its artistic merit. It screened at the New York Film Festival on 19 September 1964. Upon its subsequent cinema release, the film turned out a commercial failure.

== Reception ==
Press reactions to Lilith were mostly negative when it was first released. After the film's presentation at the New York Film Festival, the critic of the New York Times wrote a reserved review, praising the "striking images" and Jean Seberg's "fresh, flighty, fearsome performance", but faulting the lack of a "lucid demonstration of what the whole thing means" and weak acting by Warren Beatty and Peter Fonda.

Reviews in later years were more sympathetic, calling it "ambitious" and "sadly underrated" (Chris Lloyd, Time Out) and "a masterpiece" (Dave Kehr, Chicago Reader). In the 1975 The New Biographical Dictionary of Film, David Thomson described Lilith as "an oddity, the only one of [Rossen's] films that seems passionate, mysterious and truly personal. The other films will look increasingly dated and self-contained, but Lilith may grow." In her 2015 review for The Village Voice, critic Melissa Anderson saw in Lilith a "fascinatingly fractured" film which recalled Last Year at Marienbad, pointing out the presence of Jean Seberg "who most indelibly imprints the film with otherworldliness".

== Awards and nominations ==
Lilith reached #6 in the 1965 best films list of Cahiers du Cinéma. Jean Seberg was nominated for the Golden Globe Award for Best Actress in a Drama Film by the Hollywood Foreign Press Association.

== Legacy ==
The Academy Film Archive preserved Lilith in 2000.

In 2013, the Harvard Film Archive screened Lilith as part of its retrospective on Robert Rossen.
