= J. R. Salamanca =

American writer and professor (1922–2013)

- Born: Jack Richard Salamanca; December 20, 1922; St. Petersburg, Florida, U.S.
- Died: October 30, 2013 (aged 90); Potomac, Maryland, U.S.
- Occupations: Writer; professor

Jack Richard Salamanca (born December 20, 1922, in St. Petersburg, Florida — October 30, 2013, in Potomac, Maryland) was an American writer and professor emeritus at the University of Maryland. His first novel, The Lost Country (1958), was made into Wild in the Country, a 1961 film starring Elvis Presley; his second, Lilith, was filmed as Lilith in 1964, starring Warren Beatty.

== Books ==
- The Lost Country (1958)
- Lilith (1961)
- A Sea Change (1969)
- Embarkation (1973)
- Southern Light (1986)
- That Summer's Trance (2000)
