= Hawk (TV series) =

Television series

- Reynolds as John Hawk.
- Genre: Crime drama
- Created by: Allan Sloane
- Written by: Allan Sloane; Edward Adler; Don Mankiewicz; Albert Ruben
- Directed by: Sam Wanamaker; Richard Benedict; Paul Henreid; Alexander Singer
- Starring: Burt Reynolds; Wayne Grice; Bruce Glover; Leon Janney
- Theme music composer: Kenyon Hopkins; Nelson Riddle
- Composers: Kenyon Hopkins; Nelson Riddle (one episode); Shorty Rogers (one episode)
- Country of origin: United States
- Original language: English
- No. of seasons: 1
- No. of episodes: 17

Production
- Executive producer: Hubbell Robinson
- Producer: Paul Bogart
- Production location: New York City
- Editors: Norman Colbert; Arline Garson; Murray Solomon; Donald W. Starling
- Camera setup: Single-camera
- Running time: 60 minutes (with commercials)
- Production company: Screen Gems

Original release
- Network: ABC
- Release: September 8 – December 29, 1966

Hawk is a crime drama series starring Burt Reynolds, which aired on ABC from September 8, 1966 to December 29, 1966. The Screen Gems series was Reynolds' first starring role in a television series since leaving Gunsmoke the previous year.

== Synopsis ==
Reynolds stars as police lieutenant John Hawk, a full-blooded Iroquois working the streets of New York City as a special detective for the city's District Attorney's office. Hawk is assisted by partner Dan Carter (played by Wayne Grice). Hawk and Carter try to solve various serious crimes such as murder and arson, as well as cases involving organized crime. While facing the brutal, dangerous life of a New York City detective, Hawk is also subjected to discrimination and racism, both on the streets and in the office, due to his native heritage and ancestry.

Many of the scenes were filmed on location in New York City, with some interior scenes filmed at the Filmways Studios in East Harlem.

The series co-stars Bruce Glover as Assistant D.A. Murray Slaken, and Leon Janney as Assistant D.A. Ed Gorton.

Notable guest stars who appear in the series include Gene Hackman, Martin Sheen, Robert Duvall, Diana Muldaur, Scott Glenn, Diane Baker, James Best, Bert Convy, Elizabeth Ashley, Kim Hunter and Lou Antonio.

While not a full-blooded Native American like his character, Reynolds claimed to have some Cherokee blood from his father's side.

== Production ==
The show was announced in June 1966. ABC made a commitment for 17 episodes. The lead role was given to Reynolds who had some Native American ancestry himself and played Native Americans in Gunsmoke and in Navajo Joe.

"I wanted the Indian thing to come naturally", said Reynolds.

"The emphasis will be on how cops function at night", said producer Paul Bogart. "The people who come out at night would astonish you. They're the weirdos of all time."

A representative of ABC said "it won't be another Naked City where they want to know why the killer pulled the trigger. Hawk won't answer that question."

"We're not going for the psychological approach", said Reynolds. "We're an action adventure show. It's fast paced the music is all brass there's a lot of cutting."

"Hawk is quite a character", said Reynolds. "He's very hostile. I'm hostile too. I don't know why."

Reynolds says his performance was inspired by Kirk Douglas in Detective Story and John Garfield. "Tough and hard... I play Hawk as a catalyst. And how things affect me."

"We're placing no special emphasis on the fact that Hawk is an Indian", said Reynolds. "I'm not running around in moccasins or anything like that."

Reynolds added,"Having been in two TV series... where I hold the horse for someone else this feels great. But I'm not going to fall into the trap of thinking this is my one big chance and if I blow it I’m finished. I've had so many disappointments over the years that I've made up my mind: if it doesn't go it's the audience's fault, not mine."

Reynolds says Hawk was originally meant to wear knives on his sleeves but he got that changed feeling it was too gimmicky.

The show was shot on location in New York.

"I do all the stunts because I can do them better than anyone else", said Reynolds.

== Repeat broadcasts ==
Despite being a short-lived series, repeats of Hawk have resurfaced at least three times, as a way to present Reynolds' early work before he became a successful movie celebrity:

- Repeats of Hawk aired on NBC in the spring and summer of 1976, to capitalize on Reynolds' success in the same manner as CBS did with his later series, Dan August, in 1973 and 1975.
- Hawk would later be syndicated to local stations in 1984 through Colex Enterprises.
- Episodes of the series have also appeared on the digital multicast network GetTV.

== Episodes ==
No.	Title	Written by	Original release date
1	"Do Not Mutilate or Spindle"	Allan Sloane	September 8, 1966
Hawk is on a case of a murdered office worker, with its possible link being a religious fanatic named Houston Worth (Gene Hackman).
2	"The Longleat Chronicles"	Albert Ruben	September 15, 1966
Hawk falls in love with a girl involved in a murder (Diane Baker).
3	"Thanks for the Honeymoon"	David Ellis (story); Don M. Mankiewicz (teleplay)	September 22, 1966
Hawk tries to prove that a man is innocent of murder.
4	"Game with a Dead End"	George Bellak	September 29, 1966
Hawk searches for a missing girl. Guest stars include Bert Convy.
5	"Death Comes Full Circle"	Lou Shaw (story); Edward Adler and Lou Shaw (teleplay)	October 6, 1966
With the help of his shrewd lawyer, a hit and run killer avoids prosecution. Guest stars include Martin Sheen.
6	"The Theory of the Innocent Bystander"	Edward Adler	October 13, 1966
Hawk is in search of a stolen limousine. But its contents are even more valuable -- $1 million in securities. Guest stars include Robert Duvall.
7	"The Man Who Owned Everyone"	Andy Lewis	October 20, 1966
Hawk catches a crook, known to have friends in the political arena. Diana Muldaur guest stars.
8	"How Close Can You Get?"	Lewis Reed (story); Don M. Mankiewicz (teleplay)	October 27, 1966
A Shakespearean actor receives anonymous letters from a murderer, telling him of his heinous crimes.
9	"The Living End of Sisterbaby"	Ellen M. Violett	November 3, 1966
A model gets murdered, and Hawk suspects that the murderer works in the upper ranks of the business. Guest-starring Vincent Gardenia.
10	"The Shivering Pigeon"	Leon Tokatyan	November 10, 1966
Hawk is in search of a stool pigeon (Lou Antonio), hoping that he finds him before the mob does.
11	"Ulysses and the Republic"	Edward Adler	November 17, 1966
Hawk's old friend, Ulysses, was murdered in his apartment building; it is up to him to find out who was responsible.
12	"Legacy for a Lousy Future"	Albert Ruben	November 24, 1966
Hawk tries to recover $250,000 that a crook has hidden before he was sent to prison.
13	""H" is a Dirty Letter"	Philip S. Goodman (story); Robert Hamner (teleplay)	December 1, 1966
Hawk searches for the ringleader in New York City's heroin trade. Guest stars include Frank Converse.
14	"Some Devil Whispered in His Ear"	Mann Rubin	December 8, 1966
A killer threatens customers at an East Side bar.
15	"The Hands of Corbin Claybrooke"	Robert Van Scoyk	December 15, 1966
Hawk looks for answers when an artist is framed for murder.
16	"Wall of Silence"	Robert Crean	December 22, 1966
Hawk reaches out to a mentally disabled girl (Emily Prager), who was an only witness to a murder. Guest stars include Kim Hunter.
17	"Blind Man's Bluff"	Edward Adler	December 29, 1966
Hawk is on a hunt for a murderer with an unusual motive -- all his victims were cab drivers with 7-year-old daughters. Guests include James Best.

== Reception ==
=== Critical ===
Reviewing the pilot the New York Times said it was "too shrill and intense to be entirely winning but it did have enough virtues to suggest the series may find a niche for itself."

=== Ratings ===
Ratings were poor and ABC announced the show's cancellation in October, when 12 episodes had been filmed.

Reynolds later called it "a good show but it went off quickly."
