= Just Tell Her Jim Said Hello =

Single by Elvis Presley
- A-side: "She's Not You"
- Released: July 17, 1962
- Recorded: March 19, 1962
- Studio: RCA's Studio B, Nashville
- Genre: Rock and roll
- Length: 1:56
- Songwriters: Jerry Leiber; Mike Stoller

Elvis Presley singles chronology
"Good Luck Charm" / "Anything That's Part of You" (1962)	"She's Not You" / "Just Tell Her Jim Said Hello" (1962)	"King of the Whole Wide World" (1962)

"Just Tell Her Jim Said Hello" is a song originally recorded by Elvis Presley with backing vocals provided by the Jordanaires. It was written by Jerry Leiber and Mike Stoller. It reached number 55 on the Billboard Hot 100 in 1962.

== Composition ==
The song was written by Jerry Leiber and Mike Stoller and published by Elvis Presley Music, Inc.

== Recording and releases ==
Elvis Presley recorded the song on March 19, 1962, at RCA Studio B in Nashville, Tennessee. The recording sessions featured Grady Martin on guitar and vibes, Harold Bradley and Scotty Moore on guitar, Bob Moore on bass, Buddy Harman and D.J. Fontana on drums, Floyd Cramer on piano and organ, Boots Randolph on saxophone and vibes. Additional vocals were provided by Millie Kirkham and the Jordanaires.

The song was recorded during a two-night recording session in March 1962 in Nashville that resulted in Elvis' album Pot Luck. The Elvis Presley official website recounts:

Released just one year after his last studio album, Pot Luck was the product of a two-night Nashville session in March. All the songs were newly written save for the Leiber-Stoller catalog composition "Just Tell Her Jim Said Hello," which Hill and Range rep Freddy Bienstock was so convinced was going to be a hit that it was saved for single release from the start.

The song was released as a single, with "She's Not You" on the opposite side, on July 17, 1962.

Freddy Bienstock was proved wrong. "Just Tell Her Jim Said Hello," for all of its good qualities, was not the hit he was certain it would be. Instead, "She's Not You," the new Leiber-Stoller-Pomus composition, performed surprisingly well as an uncharacteristically pensive A-side, selling 800,000 copies and underscoring Elvis' sense of himself in his new interpretive role.

"She's Not You" peaked on the Billboard Hot 100 at number five, while "Just Tell Her Jim Said Hello" peaked at number 55.

The song was later included on the compilation Elvis' Gold Records Vol. 4, released on January 22, 1968.

== Track listing ==
7" single (RCA Victor 47-8041, 1962)
No.	Title	Writer(s)	Length
1.	"She's Not You"	Doc Pomus, Jerry Leiber, Mike Stoller	2:07
2.	"Just Tell Her Jim Said Hello"	Mike Stoller, Jerry Leiber	1:56

== Charts ==
Chart (1962)	Peak position
US Adult Contemporary (Billboard)	14
US Billboard Hot 100	55
