= Kid Galahad (EP) =

EP (soundtrack) by Elvis Presley
- Released: August 28, 1962
- Recorded: October 26–27, 1961
- Studio: Radio Recorders (Hollywood)
- Genre: Pop
- Length: 14:03
- Label: RCA Victor
- Producer: Jeff Alexander

Elvis Presley chronology
Pot Luck (1962)	Kid Galahad (1962)	Girls! Girls! Girls! (1962)

Singles from Kid Galahad
- 1. "King of the Whole Wide World" Released: 1962; 2. "I Got Lucky" Released: 1963 (Germany only)

Kid Galahad is an EP by American singer Elvis Presley, containing six songs from the motion picture of the same name. Six songs were recorded for the film and the soundtrack was issued as an extended play record in August 1962 to coincide with the film's premiere. The extended play record was certified Gold by the Recording Industry Association of America on March 27, 1992, for the sales of 250,000 copies. The featured song from the album, "King of the Whole Wide World", received Top 40 radio airplay and reached No. 30 on the Billboard Hot 100 singles chart. The extended play record was the number-one EP in the UK for 17 weeks.

== Recording and release history ==
Recording sessions took place ten months prior to the film's release on October 26 and 27, 1961, at Radio Recorders Studios in Hollywood, California. At this point in his career Presley had a proven sales track record, and up to 300 demos were often submitted for a single film, even given the requisite publishing arrangements favorable toward the companies owned by Elvis and the Colonel, Elvis Presley Music and Gladys Music. As the plots for Presley films became interchangeable, songs rejected for a certain storyline could later be used for an entirely different film, as with "A Whistling Tune" which had been omitted from Presley's previous film Follow That Dream but found a place here instead.

== Track listing ==
Side one
No.	Title	Writer(s)	Recording date	Length
1.	"King of the Whole Wide World"	Ruth Batchlor and Bob Roberts	October 27, 1961	2:07
2.	"This Is Living"	Fred Wise and Ben Weisman	October 27, 1961	1:43
3.	"Riding the Rainbow"	Fred Wise and Ben Weisman	October 26, 1961	1:38

Side two
No.	Title	Writer(s)	Recording date	Length
1.	"Home Is Where the Heart Is"	Sherman Edwards and Hal David	October 26, 1961	1:50
2.	"I Got Lucky"	Fred Wise and Ben Weisman	October 27, 1961	1:54
3.	"A Whistling Tune"	Sherman Edwards and Hal David	October 26, 1961	2:24

== Personnel ==
- Elvis Presley – vocals
- The Jordanaires – background vocals
- Boots Randolph – saxophone
- Scotty Moore – rhythm guitar
- Neal Matthews, Jr. – acoustic guitar
- Tiny Timbrell – lead guitar
- Dudley Brooks – piano
- Bob Moore – double bass
- D.J. Fontana – drums
- Buddy Harman – drums
