= Wild in the Country =

1961 film starring Elvis Presley

- Theatrical release poster
- Directed by: Philip Dunne
- Screenplay by: Clifford Odets
- Based on: The Lost Country by J. R. Salamanca
- Produced by: Jerry Wald
- Starring: Elvis Presley; Hope Lange; Tuesday Weld; Millie Perkins; Rafer Johnson; John Ireland
- Cinematography: William C. Mellor
- Edited by: Dorothy Spencer
- Music by: Kenyon Hopkins
- Production company: 20th Century Fox
- Distributed by: 20th Century Fox
- Release dates: June 8, 1961 (Memphis, Tennessee); June 15, 1961 (United States)
- Running time: 114 minutes
- Country: United States
- Language: English
- Budget: $2,975,000
- Box office: $2.5 million

Wild in the Country is a 1961 American musical-drama film directed by Philip Dunne and starring Elvis Presley, Hope Lange, Tuesday Weld, Millie Perkins, Rafer Johnson and John Ireland. Based on the 1958 novel The Lost Country by J. R. Salamanca, the screenplay concerns a troubled young man from a dysfunctional family who pursues a literary career. The screenplay was written by playwright Clifford Odets.

== Plot ==
Glenn Tyler, a childish 25-year old, gets into a fight with and badly injures his drunken brother. A court releases him on probation into the care of his uncle in a small town, appointing Irene Sperry to give him psychological counselling. Marked as a trouble-maker, he is falsely suspected of various misdemeanors including an affair with Irene. Eventually shown to be innocent, he leaves to go to college and become a writer.

== Cast ==
- Elvis Presley as Glenn Tyler
- Hope Lange as Irene Sperry
- Tuesday Weld as Mrs. Noreen Martin
- Millie Perkins as Betty Lee Parsons
- Rafer Johnson as Davis
- John Ireland as Phil Macy
- Gary Lockwood as Cliff Macy
- William Mims as Uncle Rolfe Braxton
- Raymond Greenleaf as Dr. Underwood
- Christina Crawford as Monica George
- Jack Orrison as Dr. Creston (uncredited)
- Pat Buttram as Mr. Longstreet, the Mechanic (uncredited)
- Jason Robards Sr. as Judge Tom Parker (uncredited)
- Red West as Glenn's brother (uncredited)
- Michael Intlekofer as Noreen's infant son (uncredited)

== Background ==
=== Development ===
The film was based on the debut novel by J. R. Salamanca. He wrote it over seven years.

Jerry Wald bought the screen rights to the novel in March 1958, before the book had been published. He wanted Bradford Dillman and Margaret Leighton to play the lead.

In August 1959, Wald said Joe Stephens was writing the script.

Philip Dunne was approached to make the film by producer Jerry Wald when they were shooting In Love and War together. Wald always intended to cast Elvis Presley in the lead and originally wanted Simone Signoret to appear opposite him.

In August 1960, Clifford Odets signed to write the screenplay, with Dunne to direct. Filming was to start in November. "It pained me to hear him rationalise writing the screenplay", said Odets' colleague Harold Clurman.

Dunne says the studio came under the control of Bob Goldstein, who refused to meet Simone Signoret's salary demands, and insisted Dunne and Wald use someone under contract to the studio. At one stage Barbara Bel Geddes was cast. They eventually cast Hope Lange, even though Wald and Dunne felt she was too young for the part. The studio then refused to keep paying Odets, firing him two weeks before filming.

The film was Millie Perkins' second film under her contract at Fox. The first was The Diary of Anne Frank filmed two and a half years previously.

Presley's fee was reportedly $300,000.

Dunne says the studio fired Odets with the script only half written so he had to finish it himself. Dunne did not want to do this, but was persuaded otherwise.

=== Shooting ===
Wild in the Country started filming in November 1960. It was the last movie to shoot at the colonial mansion which had been on the studio backlot since 1934 – this was knocked down and sold after filming completed.

The movie was also shot on location in Napa Valley and in Hollywood Studios, although it is set in the Shenandoah Valley. The cast and crew created a public sensation in Napa for over two months of filming. The motel where many of the cast stayed, Casa Beliveau (renamed the Wine Valley Lodge, now supportive housing for the homeless), was so mobbed that Elvis had to be moved to the St. Helena home that was being used in the film as Irene Sperry's house, where Glenn Tyler went for counseling. Now a top-rated inn in Napa Valley and known as The Ink House, the room where Presley stayed for over two months can still be rented.

Other Napa Valley locations featured in the movie. The opening scene was filmed along portions of the Napa River. This section of the river is located at what is now the Casa Nuestra Winery, between Calistoga and St. Helena. Calistoga's downtown main street was used as the hometown of Glenn Tyler's uncle and his cousin. Other filming locations in Napa Valley include the Silverado Trail between Calistoga and St. Helena, the Cameo Cinema (then The Roxy), an old movie theater still in operation in downtown St. Helena where the dance hall scenes with Elvis and Tuesday Weld were filmed, and the hills and farmland behind what is now Whitehall Lane Winery just north of the town of Rutherford.

Dunne recalled, "For his love scenes with Hope Lange, he couldn't get the right tempo so, I had him listen to Bach's Fifth Brandenburg Concerto. Presley listened intently, then said, 'Hey, man, now I get it!' And he did the smooching very slowly, in one take."

The Ink House was used as the house and backyard where a drunken Glenn Tyler tries to hose down Irene Sperry through the porch window, and the nearby 1885 barn is where Irene Sperry drives her DeSoto in to attempt suicide when she is so distraught over her suspected romance with Glenn and the scandal it has caused. In one scene, Betty Lee slaps Glenn. Millie Perkins suffered a broken arm while doing the scene, and before the film was released, the scene ended up being cut out of the movie.

Philip Dunne says that 20th Century Fox insisted on the insertion of four songs for Elvis Presley. Three were used in the film.

This was Elvis' last dramatic lead role until Charro!, as his next film, Blue Hawaii, was his first big budget musical-comedy and was a box office sensation. All his subsequent movies were largely formula musical-comedies which were quite lucrative but never gave him the chance to develop his potential as a serious actor that was very apparent in Wild in the Country. With the future formulaic musical-comedy routine in the making, Presley's fate had been sealed as a B-movie actor.

Presley began an off-screen romance with Hollywood "bad girl" Tuesday Weld but the relationship was short-lived after Elvis's manager, Colonel Tom Parker, warned him against his involvement, fearful it would harm his image. Elvis and Hope Lange also were quite taken with each other, but her separation from her husband did not result in a divorce until the next summer making her unavailable for a serious relationship. She was also involved in a relationship with Glenn Ford.

Other notable members in the cast included Jason Robards, Sr. (in his final role), Christina Crawford (daughter of Joan Crawford), Pat Buttram and the legendary Rudd Weatherwax who trained the animals used in the movie.

=== Reshoots ===
In the original script and rough cut of the film, Lange's character, Irene Sperry, succeeds in her suicide attempt. However, preview audiences reacted negatively to this and the scene was redone with Irene surviving and seeing Glenn off to college.

== Soundtrack ==
Recording sessions took place on November 7 and 8, 1960, at Radio Recorders in Hollywood, California, under the supervision of producer Urban Thielmann. Five songs were recorded for the film, with "Lonely Man" and "Forget Me Never" left out of the film.

Since Wild in the Country showcased Presley the actor rather than the singing star, RCA elected to release neither a long-playing album nor an EP as the soundtrack for a Presley film. The Colonel promised 20th Century Fox to assist with promotion by releasing some songs on singles. Despite being cut from the film, "Lonely Man" was actually the first song from the score to be released, appearing on February 7, 1961, as catalogue 47-7850b, the B-side of Presley's chart-topping hit single, "Surrender."

The title track to the film, "Wild in the Country" (included in the film), was released on the very next single, catalogue 47-7880b on May 2, 1961, as the B-side of the No.5 hit "I Feel So Bad." Both B-sides made the Billboard Hot 100 independently of their A-sides, "Lonely Man" peaking at No.32 and "Wild in the Country" at No.26.

The songs "In My Way" (included in the film) and "Forget Me Never" would be included on the 1965 anniversary compilation album Elvis for Everyone, while "I Slipped, I Stumbled, I Fell" (included in the film) appeared on the 1961 album Something for Everybody.

The soundtrack was re-released on the Follow that Dream collectors label with unreleased outtakes of all the songs.

=== Track listing ===
1. "Wild in the Country" (George Weiss, Hugo Peretti, Luigi Creatore)
2. "I Slipped, I Stumbled, I Fell" (Ben Weisman, Fred Wise)
3. "In My Way" (Ben Weisman, Fred Wise)
4. "Husky Dusky Day" (a cappella duet with Hope Lange) (unknown recording date and location)

=== Personnel ===
- Elvis Presley – vocals, guitar
- The Jordanaires – background vocals
- Scotty Moore – electric guitars
- Tiny Timbrell – acoustic guitars
- Jimmie Haskell – accordion
- Dudley Brooks – piano
- Meyer Rubin – double bass
- D.J. Fontana – drums

== Reception ==
The film received mixed to negative reviews from critics. Bosley Crowther of The New York Times wrote: "Nonsense, that's all it is—sheer nonsense—and Mr. Presley, who did appear to be improving as an actor in his last picture, is as callow as ever in this. The few times he sings are painful—at least they are to our ears—and his appearance is waxy and flabby. Elvis has retrogressed. So have Jerry Wald, the producer; Philip Dunne, the director; and, alas, Mr. Odets."

Variety wrote: "Dramatically, there simply isn't substance, novelty or spring to this wobbly and artificial tale ... It is difficult to accept the character as a 'potential literary genius' and, for that matter, the lovely and sophisticated Miss Lange as a lonely, learned widow with surprisingly few male admirers but a penchant for resurrecting lost, young, boyish souls. It's a credit to both that they do as well as they do."

Harrison's Reports graded the film as "Fair", calling the screenplay "unsophisticated but well-paced."

Charles Stinson of the Los Angeles Times called the film a "fairly acceptable melodrama", crediting a "sharp and unpretentious script by Clifford Odets, who adapted it from a novel by J. R. Salamanca. But credit must also be given young Mr. Presley who, with every film, keeps on improving as a performer. 'Wild in the Country' will take no prizes but it proved a lot better than this reviewer was steeling himself for."

The Monthly Film Bulletin wrote, "In view of the generally murky photography, art direction and acting and Philip Dunne's soporific direction, the film's one rewarding feature—Hope Lange's sensitive and (wherever possible) intelligent playing of the psychiatrist-literary agent—is nothing short of a miracle. Presley gives an unassuming, sub-sub-Brando performance—even a likeable one in the hotel love scene: but one can't help feeling he was infinitely better off in every way prior to this misguided bid for class."

Philip Dunne later wrote that the film "fell between two stools. Audiences who might have liked a Clifford Odets drama wouldn't buy Elvis and his songs; Elvis's fans were disappointed in a Presley picture which departed so radically from his usual song-and-sex comedy formula. On both factions his fine performance was tragically wasted."

== See also ==
- List of American films of 1961
