= Winfield Scott (songwriter) =

American songwriter Born in 1920s

Winfield Scott (November 27, 1920 – October 26, 2015), also known as Robie Kirk, was an American songwriter and singer. He wrote or co-wrote the hit songs "Tweedle Dee" for LaVern Baker, and he was a co-writer with Otis Blackwell of "Return to Sender" for Elvis Presley. "Return to Sender", written for the Presley film Girls! Girls! Girls!, was a U.K. No.1 single and peaked at No.2 on the U.S. Billboard Hot 100.

Scott was born in Bloomfield, New Jersey. In the 1950s, he was a member of a vocal group, The Cues.

Scott was a longtime collaborator of Otis Blackwell and together they were hired to write a song for the Elvis Presley film Roustabout. While the film was released in 1964, the song "I'm a Roustabout" was not used, producer Hal Wallis instead preferring "Roustabout", written by Bill Giant, Bernie Baum and Florence Kaye, as the title song. In 2003, a remark made to Peter Guarraci, a Star Ledger reporter, by Scott started a search for the lost recording of the Presley song, which was eventually found and released on the 2003 Elvis Presley compilation album, 2nd to None. Another Scott and Blackwell collaboration is the R&B classic "Home In Your Heart".

Scott also wrote "Many Tears Ago" for Connie Francis. Released in October, 1960, the song reached number 7 on the Billboard Hot 100.

Scott died on October 26, 2015, at age 94.

== Partial song list ==
- "Tweedlee Dee" (LaVern Baker and The Gliders)
- "Burn That Candle" (Bill Haley, Emmylou Harris)
- "Bop-Ting-a-Ling" with Blackwell (LaVern Baker)
- "We’re Comin’ In Loaded" with Blackwell (Elvis Presley)
- "(Such an) Easy Question" with Blackwell (Elvis Presley)
- "Return to Sender" with Blackwell (Elvis Presley)
- "One Broken Heart for Sale" with Blackwell (Elvis Presley)
- "Oh Why?" (Little Richard)
- "Please Don’t Drag That String Around" with Blackwell (Elvis Presley)
- "Long Legged Girl (with the Short Dress On)" with Leslie McFarland (Elvis Presley)
- I'm a Roustabout with Blackwell (Elvis Presley)
- "Stranger in the Crowd" (Elvis Presley)
- "Comfy'n Cozy" with Blackwell (Conway Twitty)
- "A Bucket of Tears" (Peggy Lee)
- "Sweetheart" (Peggy Lee)
- "That's Right" (Mills Brothers) 1956
- "Mister Moon" (Pat Boone) 1963
- "Many Tears Ago" (Connie Francis)
