= Good Luck Charm =

- Original US Picture Sleeve

Single by Elvis Presley
- B-side: "Anything That's Part of You"
- Released: February 27, 1962
- Recorded: October 15, 1961
- Studio: RCA Studio B, Nashville
- Genre: Rock and roll; pop
- Length: 2:27
- Label: RCA Victor
- Songwriters: Aaron Schroeder, Wally Gold
- Producer: Steve Sholes

Elvis Presley singles chronology
"Can't Help Falling in Love" / "Rock-A-Hula Baby" (1961)	"Good Luck Charm" / "Anything That's Part of You" (1962)	"She's Not You" / "Just Tell Her Jim Said Hello" (1962)

Music video
- "Good Luck Charm" (audio) on YouTube

"Good Luck Charm" is a song recorded by Elvis Presley and published by Gladys Music, Elvis Presley's publishing company, that reached number 1 on the Billboard Hot 100 list in the week ending April 21, 1962. It remained at the top of the list for two weeks. It was also No. 1 on the Cash Box chart in the US. It reached number 1 in the UK Singles Chart in the week ending May 24, 1962, and stayed there for five weeks.

== Background ==
The song was written by Aaron Schroeder and Wally Gold and recorded at RCA Studio B in Nashville, Tennessee by Presley on October 15, 1961. It completed his second hat-trick of chart topping singles in the UK. Presley is joined vocally on the chorus by Jordanaires first tenor Gordon Stoker. The single was certified Platinum by the RIAA on March 27, 1992. The single reached No. 2 on the UK singles chart in a five-week chart run in 2005 in a re-release. The B-side was "Anything That's Part of You", which also reached the Top 40 in the US.

== Personnel ==
Recorded on October 15, 1961, at RCA's Studio B, Nashville, the session featured the following personnel:

- Jerry Kennedy, guitar, replacing the injured Hank Garland
- Scotty Moore, guitar
- Bob Moore, bass
- Buddy Harman, drums
- D.J. Fontana, drums
- Floyd Cramer, piano and organ
- Boots Randolph, saxophone
- Gordon Stoker, accordion
- Millie Kirkham, backing vocals
- The Jordanaires, backing vocals

== Album appearances ==
The first LP appearance was on the album Elvis' Golden Records Volume 3 released in September, 1963. It was on the 1973 RCA Special Products Elvis double LP compilation (DPL2-0056(e)) and the 1978 package Worldwide Gold Award Hits, Parts 3 and 4 (R214657), a 2 record set. The recording was included on the 1993 compilation From Nashville to Memphis: The Essential '60s Masters. The track also appeared on the 1999 career retrospective collection Artist of the Century. The song was also featured on the 2002 compilation ELV1S: 30 No. 1 Hits.
