= King of the Whole Wide World =

Single by Elvis Presley

from the EP Kid Galahad
- A-side: "King of the Whole Wide World" "Home Is Where the Heart Is"
- Released: 1962
- Recorded: 1961
- Studio: Radio Recorders, Hollywood
- Genre: Rock and roll
- Length: 2:07
- Songwriters: Bob Roberts; Ruth Batchelor

Elvis Presley singles chronology
"She's Not You" / "Just Tell Her Jim Said Hello" (1962)	"King of the Whole Wide World" / "Home Is Where the Heart Is" (1962)	"Return to Sender" / "Where Do You Come From" (1962)

"King of the Whole Wide World" is a song written by Bob Roberts and Ruth Batchelor and originally recorded by Elvis Presley for the 1962 United Artists motion picture Kid Galahad. The track opened the 6-track soundtrack EP released in August 1962 to coincide with the film's premiere.

The song reached number 30 on the Billboard Hot 100. According to Elvis Presley's official website, "'King of the Whole Wide World' might have gotten more chart activity, but it was competing with 'She's Not You,' which had just broken into the Top 100 when the [soundtrack] EP was shipped."

== Composition ==
The song was written by Bob Roberts and Ruth Batchelor.

== Recording ==
Presley recorded the song for the film Kid Galahad on October 27, 1961, at Radio Recorders in Hollywood, California. The recording sessions featured Scotty Moore, Tiny Timbrell and Neal Matthews on guitar, Bob Moore on bass, D.J. Fontana and Buddy Harman on drums, Dudley Brooks on piano, Boots Randolph on saxophone. Backing vocals were provided by the Jordanaires.

== Track listing ==
7" promo single (RCA Victor SP-45-118, 1962, United States) 7" single (RCA 47-9417, 1962, Germany)
No.	Title	Writer(s)	Artist	Length
1.	"King of the Whole Wide World"	Bob Roberts, Ruth Batchelor	Elvis Presley with the Jordanaires	2:07
2.	"Home Is Where the Heart Is"	Hal David, Sherman Edwards	Elvis Presley with the Jordanaires	1:50

== Charts ==
Chart (1962)	Peak position
West Germany (GfK)	26
US Billboard Hot 100	30
