= Return to Sender (song) =

1962 single by Elvis Presley

Single by Elvis Presley

from the album Girls! Girls! Girls!
- B-side: "Where Do You Come From"
- Released: October 2, 1962
- Recorded: March 27, 1962
- Studio: Radio Recorders, Hollywood
- Genre: Pop; rock and roll
- Length: 2:09
- Label: RCA Victor
- Songwriters: Winfield Scott; Otis Blackwell
- Producers: Steve Sholes and Chet Atkins

Elvis Presley singles chronology
"King of the Whole Wide World" / "Home Is Where the Heart Is" (1962)	"Return to Sender" / "Where Do You Come From" (1962)	"One Broken Heart for Sale" / "They Remind Me Too Much of You" (1963)

Music video
- "Return to Sender" (audio) on YouTube

"Return to Sender" is a song recorded by American singer Elvis Presley and featured in the film Girls! Girls! Girls!. The song was written by Winfield Scott and Otis Blackwell to suit Presley's rock and roll musical style. The singer laments his relationship with a spiteful partner. Released on October 2, 1962, and published by Elvis Presley Music, the song became a commercial hit and received praise for its lyricism and melody.

The song peaked at number one on the UK Singles Chart, and was the UK Christmas number one in 1962. It was also the first Christmas number one in the Irish Singles Chart. In the United States, "Return to Sender" reached No. 2 on the American Billboard singles chart, kept out of the top spot by The Four Seasons' "Big Girls Don't Cry". However, the song reached No. 1 on the rival Cash Box and Music Vendor singles charts. "Return to Sender" also went to No. 5 on the Billboard R&B charts. The single was certified platinum by the RIAA for sales in excess of one million units in the US.

== Background and recording ==
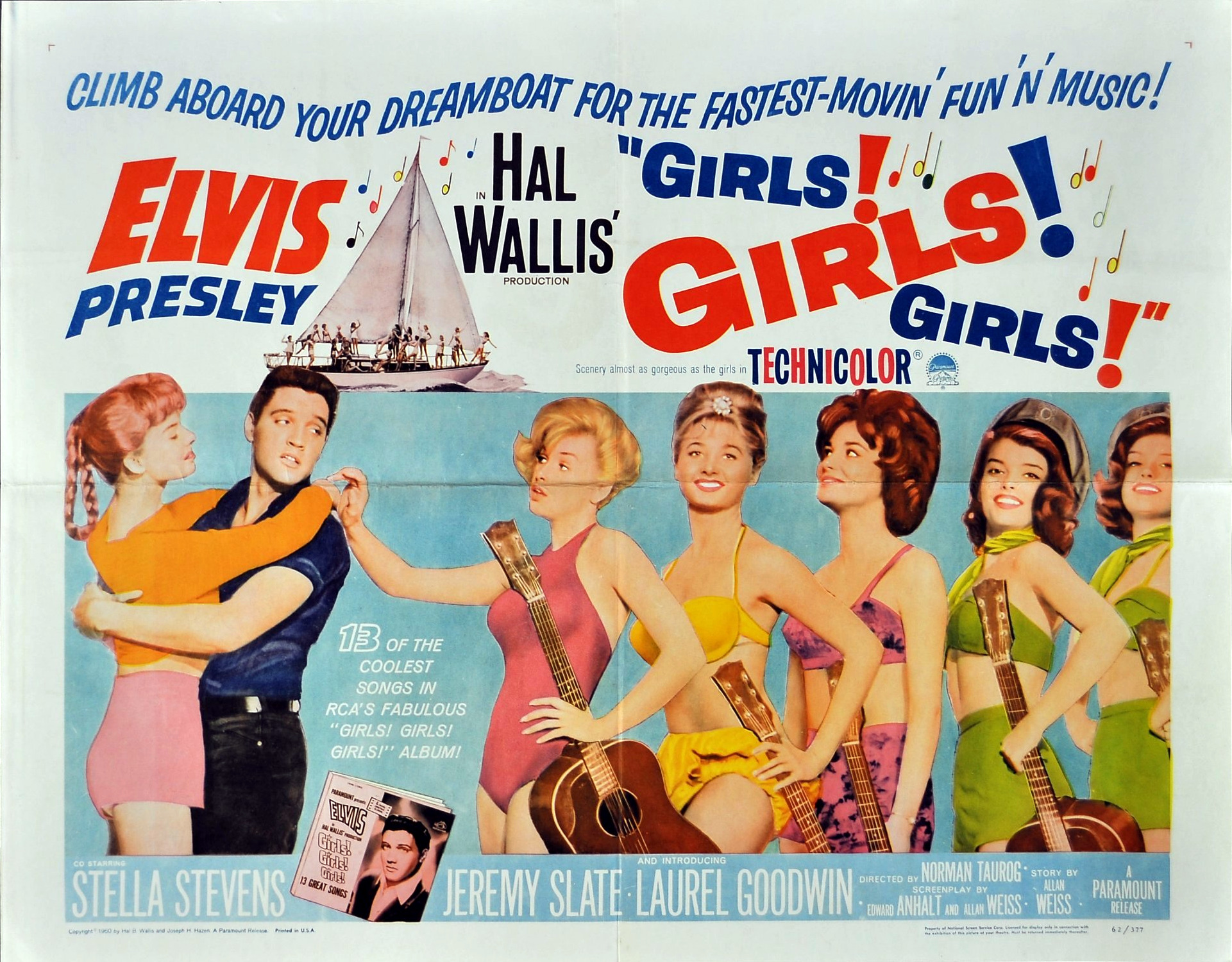
"Return to Sender" was written especially for the soundtrack Girls! Girls! Girls! (1962), which aimed to serve as a comeback for Elvis Presley.

Songwriter Otis Blackwell had already written several of Presley’s biggest hits, including "Don't Be Cruel" (1956) and "All Shook Up" (1957). Winfield Scott was a frequent collaborator with Blackwell, and writer of the hit song “Tweedle Dee” (1954). So it was logical for Freddy Bienstock, vice president of the record company Hill & Range, to turn to Blackwell and Scott to write songs for Presley's films, and for the Presley vehicle Girls! Girls! Girls! (1962) specifically. Following the # 5 pop hit of Presley's pop ballad "She's Not You" (1962), the record company wanted him to return to the rock and roll genre without alienating fans who enjoyed his crooning.

Scripts for Presley films would note places where a song was to be inserted into the film as well as suggested titles and genres for the songs. While other songwriters would adhere to those notes, Blackwell and Scott would not, because they were used to the creative freedom of the rhythm and blues field. They decided to write a great song without any concern about whether fitted into the film's storyline. After penning a track about fishing, entitled "Coming in Loaded", as well as other material they disliked, the two gave up on writing other songs until they found inspiration in a returned piece of mail. A demo that they had sent to a record company was returned to them with the words "Return to sender! No such person! No such zone!" stamped onto it. Blackwell and Scott decided to use those phrases as lyrics in a song about a failing relationship between "a spiteful woman and a heartbroken man".

Within only nine months of its release, it was the use of the word "zone" that became an anachronism when the USPOD or United States Post Office Department (the forerunner of the United States Postal Service) replaced all zones in 1963 with the nationwide rollout of ZIP Codes, thus making the song seem dated before its time, although 60 plus years later it is less of a footnote and an accepted part of the song, assumed to be used for rhyming purposes.

== Recording and composition ==
On March 27, 1962, Presley was handed the task of recording all thirteen songs on the Girls! Girls! Girls! soundtrack. He was unenthusiastic about the material and went through the recording process at a quickened pace. The Jordanaires, Dudley Brooks, D. J. Fontana, and Scotty Moore were in the studio, and other instrumentation on the album was provided by Boots Randolph on saxophone, Ray Siegel on bass, Barney Kessel and Tiny Timbrell on guitar, and Hal Blaine and Bernie Mattinson on specialty drums. When he began singing "Return to Sender," Presley became more energetic. He found the song easy to perform and recorded it in just two takes, modelling his vocal stylings on Blackwell's. While watching Presley perform the track, Moore and Fontana felt that the "old magic" of the singer's earlier work had returned.

"Return to Sender" is a pop and rock and roll song with a length of two minutes and nine seconds, and an up-tempo, "gently rock[ing]" beat. Per Presley's decision, the lead instrument of the song's chorus is Randolph's saxophone rather than a guitar, which was more characteristic of Presley's music. According to Ace Collins in Untold Gold: The Stories Behind Elvis's #1 Hits, the track "recaptured the happy enthusiasm and unbridled joy" of the rock and roll music of the mid-1950s. The song is about a heartbroken man whose mail to his lover is always returned unopened. Collins also noted a contrast between the song's joyful instrumentation and its lyrics, which are those of a "woeful ballad".

== Critical reception ==
NME said that "Return to Sender" and another song penned by Blackwell, Jerry Lee Lewis' "Great Balls of Fire" (1957), stand as "some of the most enduring classics in the rock and roll canon". In his book Untold Gold: The Stories Behind Elvis's #1 Hits, Ace Collins claims that while Blackwell wrote hits like Lewis' "Breathless" (1958) and "Fever" by Peggy Lee (1958), and influenced artists like Presley and Stevie Wonder, "it is doubtful that he ever wrote anything quite as innovative as 'Return to Sender'." Thomas Ward of AllMusic praised the song's lyrics, production, and melody, as well as Presley's vocal performance. Ward concluded his review by saying that "Although 'Return To Sender' is not a huge artistic triumph, it's a great pop song that still sounds good to modern audiences".

== Legacy ==
Gerri Granger later recorded an answer song: "Don't Want Your Letters". The song was arranged and conducted by Bert Keyes, and was released on the single Big Top 45–3128.

"Return to Sender" came back into vogue in 1993 when the U.S. Postal Service issued a commemorative postage stamp honoring Presley on what would have been his 58th birthday. Fans mailed envelopes franked with first-day issues of this stamp to fictitious addresses so that they would receive their letters back, marked with the words "return to sender".

The phrase "Return to Sender" was engraved on the coffin of Freddie Starr, a comedian and Elvis impersonator.

== Charts ==
=== Weekly charts ===
Chart (1962)	Peak position
Belgium (Ultratop 50 Flanders)	2
Belgium (Ultratop 50 Wallonia)	25
Ireland (IRMA)	1
New Zealand (Lever Hit Parade)	2
Netherlands (Single Top 100)	4
Norway (VG-lista)	1
Sweden (Kvällstoppen)	1
Sweden (Tio i Topp)	1
Switzerland (Schweizer Hitparade)	99
UK Singles (Official Charts)	1
US Billboard Hot 100	2
US R&B Singles (Billboard)	5
US Cash Box Top 100	1
US Top 50 in R&B Locations (Cash Box)	26
US Music Vendor	1
West Germany (GfK)	15

Chart (1977)	Peak position
UK Singles Chart	42

Chart (2005)	Peak position
UK Singles Chart	5

== Certifications and sales ==
Region	Certification	Certified units/sales
New Zealand (RMNZ)	Gold	15,000^{‡}
Norway	—	25,000
United Kingdom Physical sales	—	750,000
United Kingdom (BPI) Digital sales since 2004	Gold	400,000^{‡}
United States (RIAA)	Platinum	1,000,000^{^}
^{^} Shipments figures based on certification alone.^{‡} Sales+streaming figures based on certification alone.

== Bibliography ==
- Biszick-Lockwood, Bar (2010), Restless Giant: The Life and Times of Jean Aberbach and Hill and Range Songs, Urbana, Chicago and Springfield: University of Illinois Press, ISBN 978-0-252-03507-4
- Collins, Ace (2005), Untold Gold: The Stories Behind Elvis's #1 Hits, 814 North Franklin Street, Chicago, Illinois 60610: Chicago Review Press, ISBN 1-55652-565-6
- Humphries, Patrick (2003), Elvis The #1 Hits: The Secret History of the Classics, Kansas City: Andrews McMeel Publishing, ISBN 0-7407-3803-8
- Kubernik, Harvey (2006), Hollywood Shack Job: Rock Music in Film and on Your Screen, Albuquerque: University of New Mexico Press, ISBN 978-0-8263-3542-5
