= It Happened at the World's Fair =

1963 American musical film starring Elvis Presley

- Theatrical release poster
- Directed by: Norman Taurog
- Written by: Si Rose; Seaman Jacobs
- Produced by: Ted Richmond
- Starring: Elvis Presley; Joan O'Brien; Gary Lockwood
- Cinematography: Joseph Ruttenberg
- Edited by: Fredric Steinkamp; Don Guidice (uncredited)
- Music by: Leith Stevens
- Production company: Ted Richmond Productions
- Distributed by: Metro-Goldwyn-Mayer
- Release date: April 3, 1963 (USA)
- Running time: 105 minutes
- Country: United States
- Language: English
- Box office: $2,500,000 (US/ Canada)

It Happened at the World's Fair is a 1963 American musical comedy film starring Elvis Presley as a crop-dusting pilot. It was filmed in Seattle, Washington, site of the Century 21 Exposition. The governor of Washington at the time, Albert Rosellini, suggested the setting to Metro-Goldwyn-Mayer executives. The film made $2.25 million at the box office. Kurt Russell had a small uncredited role in his film debut.

== Plot ==
Pilot Mike Edwards finds himself in a dilemma. His partner and friend, Danny, has overspent the money that Mike had set aside to pay their debts. Without it, their aircraft called Bessie, a Boeing-Stearman Model 75 crop duster, is taken by the local sheriff. If Mike and Danny do not get the money in a week, Bessie will be auctioned off to the highest bidder.

Mike and Danny become reluctant hitchhikers, looking for a lift to anywhere. They are picked up by apple farmer Walter Ling and his niece Sue-Lin. They end up in Seattle, Washington, location of the 1962 World's Fair. When the uncle is called away on business, Danny persuades Mike to take Sue-Lin to tour the fair. During a visit to a doctor at the fair, Mike falls for Diane Warren, an attractive but stubborn nurse who resists his advances. He gives a quarter to a boy who kicks him in the shin so that he can be treated by her. Diane's supervisor then convinces her to give Mike a ride back to his apartment, convinced that his leg is injured. Mike and Diane dine at the top of the fair's Space Needle. However, he also courts Dorothy Johnson.

Complications then arise when Walter inexplicably fails to return the next day to get Sue-Lin, leaving her with Mike. Sue-Lin feigns illness so that Diane will come to their apartment and examine her and see Mike again. When Diane discovers that Mike is not related to Sue-Lin, she wants to inform the welfare board so that Sue-Lin can be removed from Mike and Danny's apartment. A mysterious nightfall plane delivery is conducted for Mike and Danny's friend Vince, who smuggles valuable furs. The film ends with Mike and Diane in love.

== Cast ==
- Elvis Presley as Mike Edwards, a crop-duster pilot
- Joan O'Brien as Diane Warren, a nurse and Mike's love interest
- Gary Lockwood as Danny Burke, Mike's gambling-addicted business partner
- Vicky Tiu as Sue-Lin, a young girl whom Mike befriended (Note: Vicky Tiu later became the first lady of Hawaii when she married Governor Ben Cayetano.)
- Yvonne Craig as Dorothy Johnson, another of Mike's love interests
- H. M. Wynant as Vince Bradley, Danny's crooked associate
- Kam Tong as Walter Ling, Sue-Lin's uncle
- Edith Atwater as Miss Steuben
- Guy Raymond as Barney Thatcher
- Dorothy Green as Miss Ettinger

Kurt Russell, Sandra Giles, Diane O'Donnell, and Memphis Mafia members Red West and Joe Esposito, had uncredited cameo appearances.

== Production ==
The Seattle Center, including the Seattle Center Monorail and the Space Needle, serve as backdrops for several scenes. Security officers pursue Presley and the girl through the fountains at what is now the Pacific Science Center. The hitchhiking scene with Elvis and Gary Lockwood was filmed near Camarillo, California, as were some of the flying scenes. The entire hitchhiking scene, up to the point when Mike and Danny are picked up, was filmed on 5th Street near Pleasant Valley Road on the south side of Camarillo.

While The Elvis Encyclopedia believes that the Wilburton Trestle was shown in the film, further evidence points to a different location. (Note: The history blurb on this page was written before the trestle was demolished.) It is actually a trestle over the White River between Enumclaw and Buckley, now demolished. The view in the film was taken at the intersection of Mud Mountain Road and Highway 410, looking southeast. (Note: The bend in the road and a guard rail may still be seen in the same place as in the film.) Mount Rainier is visible in the background, but it cannot be seen at that angle from the Wilburton Trestle, which is larger than the White River Trestle, at six sections high. The trestle pictured in the film is only four sections high at the road crossing. (Note: Includes a photo of the trestle, but not the part shown in the film.)

== Reception ==
Film reviewer Eugene Archer of the New York Times wrote, "Elvis Presley's budding dramatic talents have been neatly nipped in the Seattle story, which emerges as a dismal parody of the Metro-Goldwyn-Mayer musicals of old. Burdened with a dozen tuneless songs and a plot requiring him to play guardian to a mercilessly cute Chinese waif, the crooner merely swivels ingenuously through a morass of clichés." Variety wrote that "this is apt to be tedious going for all but the most confirmed of Presley's young admirers. The 10-count-'em-10 tunes he sings may be cause for rejoicing among his more ardent followers but, stacked up proportionately against the skinny story in between, it seems at least three too many ... so many warbling interruptions upset the tempo of the yarn and prevent plot and picture from gathering momentum." John L. Scott of the Los Angeles Times wrote that "it must be said that unless you're a Presley fan, the 10 songs he offers while plinking a guitar or ukulele can grow tedious, while the frivolous backgrounding story is turned on and off between tunes."

== Home media ==
The film was released in widescreen format on Region 1 DVD by Warner Home Video on August 7, 2007.

== See also ==
- List of American films of 1963
