= Ollie Jones (songwriter) =

American Singer and Lyricist

Henry Oliver Jones (December 9, 1923 – October 4, 1990) was an American singer and songwriter.

== Biography ==
Jones was born in Philadelphia. From the mid 1940s until the late 1950s, he was a member of various doo-wop vocal groups, including The Ravens, The Blenders, and The Cues. The latter group, in particular, performed as backing singers for recording stars, including LaVern Baker, Big Joe Turner, and Nat "King" Cole.

Jones also wrote songs, and with his vocal bandmates recorded demo recordings. His best-known compositions include "Send for Me", a number one R&B chart hit for Nat "King" Cole in 1957; also that year, "Build Your Love (On A Strong Foundation)" for Johnnie Ray; "Love Makes the World Go Round", a hit for Perry Como in 1958; Fabian's 1959 hit "Tiger"; "Step by Step" by The Crests in 1960; "I'll Be There" by Damita Jo, a response to Ben E. King's hit "Stand By Me"; and "Finders Keepers, Losers Weepers", recorded by Elvis Presley in 1963. Jones is credited at BMI with over 200 compositions.

Jones died in Teaneck, New Jersey, in 1990, aged 66.
