= She's Not You =

Single by Elvis Presley
- B-side: "Just Tell Her Jim Said Hello"
- Released: July 17, 1962
- Recorded: March 19, 1962
- Studio: RCA Studio B, Nashville
- Genre: Rock and roll; pop; doo-wop
- Label: RCA Victor
- Songwriters: Jerry Leiber, Mike Stoller, Doc Pomus
- Producers: Steve Sholes and Chet Atkins

Elvis Presley singles chronology
| "Good Luck Charm" (1962) | "She's Not You" / "Just Tell Her Jim Said Hello" (1962) | "Return To Sender" (1962) |

Music video
- "She's Not You" (audio) on YouTube

"She's Not You" is a 1962 song recorded by Elvis Presley and released as a single on RCA Victor.

== Background ==
The song was recorded on March 19, 1962, in the key of F major. The Jordanaires sang background vocals. It was published by Elvis Presley Music, Inc., Elvis Presley's publishing company. The song was written by Doc Pomus in collaboration with Leiber and Stoller.

"She's Not You" reached No. 5 on the Billboard Hot 100 and No. 13 on Billboard's R&B chart. In the UK, the single reached No. 1 where it stayed for three weeks. It peaked at No. 4 (for two weeks) on Billboard's competitor Cashbox's pop chart. It was also the first song on the new Irish Charts to reach number one on October 5, 1962.

Biographer, music reviewer, and music historian Dave Marsh argues that "She's Not You" "integrates the Jordanaires so completely, it's practically doo-wop".

The recording appeared on the 1963 compilation Elvis' Golden Records Volume 3 and the 2002 career retrospective collection ELV1S: 30 No. 1 Hits. Episode 1 of the 2004 BBC miniseries Blackpool featured the Presley recording, accompanied on screen by the singing and dancing of the characters, as part of the story.

== Commercial performance ==
=== Charts ===
| Chart (1962) | Peak position |
|---|---|
| Belgium (Ultratop 50 Flanders) | 3 |
| Belgium (Ultratop 50 Wallonia) | 30 |
| Ireland (IRMA) | 1 |
| Netherlands (Single Top 100) | 4 |
| New Zealand (Lever Hit Parade) | 1 |
| Norway (VG-lista) | 1 |
| Switzerland (Schweizer Hitparade) | 100 |
| UK Singles (OCC) | 1 |
| US Billboard Hot 100 | 5 |
| US Adult Contemporary (Billboard) | 2 |
| US Hot R&B/Hip-Hop Songs (Billboard) | 13 |
| West Germany (GfK) | 15 |

=== Sales ===
| Region | Certification | Certified units/sales |
|---|---|---|
| United States | — | 1,000,000 |

== Other recordings ==
Chris Isaak covered this song on his 2011 album, Beyond the Sun. The song has also been recorded by Ronnie McDowell, Ray Smith. Rupert, Con Archer, Merrill Osmond, and The 69 Cats with Wanda Jackson.
