= Girls! Girls! Girls! =

1962 film

- Theatrical release poster
- Directed by: Norman Taurog
- Screenplay by: Edward Anhalt; Allen Weiss
- Story by: Allan Weiss
- Produced by: Hal B. Wallis
- Starring: Elvis Presley; Stella Stevens; Jeremy Slate; Laurel Goodwin
- Cinematography: Loyal Griggs
- Edited by: Stanley E. Johnson
- Music by: Joseph J. Lilley
- Production company: Hal Wallis Productions
- Distributed by: Paramount Pictures
- Release dates: October 31, 1962 (Honolulu); November 21, 1962 (Los Angeles)
- Running time: 106 minutes
- Country: United States
- Language: English
- Box office: $2,600,000 (USA) or $3.6 million (US/Canada)

Girls! Girls! Girls! is a 1962 American musical comedy film starring Elvis Presley as a penniless Hawaii-based fisherman who loves his life on the sea and dreams of owning his own boat. "Return to Sender", which reached No. 2 on the Billboard pop singles chart, is featured in the film. The film peaked at #6 on the Variety box office chart and finished the year at #19 on the year-end list of the top-grossing films of 1962, having earned $2.6 million at the box office. It was also nominated for the Golden Globe award for Best Motion Picture - Musical in 1963. The film was the second of three films Presley shot on location in Hawaii.

== Plot ==
Ross Carpenter is a Hawaii-based fishing guide and sailor who enjoys boating and sailing out on the sea. When he finds out his boss is retiring to Arizona, he seeks to find a way to buy the Westwind, a boat that he built with his father.

Ross is caught in a love triangle with two women: childish, insensitive club singer Robin, and sweet Laurel. When Wesley Johnson makes advances on Laurel, Ross punches him out. Wesley owns the boat, so Ross thereby loses it. Laurel, however, is not who she pretends to be. She is an heiress getting over a bad breakup, and searching for someone who doesn't love her for her money. She secretly buys the Westwind for him, but Ross' male pride won't allow him to take it. Ross has to choose between her and Robin.

== Cast ==
- Elvis Presley as Ross Carpenter
- Stella Stevens as Robin Gantner
- Laurel Goodwin as Laurel Dodge
- Jeremy Slate as Wesley Johnson
- Benson Fong as Kin Yung
- Beulah Quo as Madam Yung
- Guy Lee as Chen Yung
- Ginny Tiu as Mai Ling
- Elizabeth Tiu as Tai Ling
- Alexander Tiu as Mai and Tai Ling's Brother
- Robert Strauss as Sam Anderson
- Ann McCrea as Mrs. Arthur Morgan (uncredited)
- Nestor Paiva as Arthur Morgan (uncredited)
- The Jordanaires as Backup Singers

== Notes ==
Pamela Tiffin was asked to play Laurel Dodge, but turned down the role.

== Reception ==
A review in Variety wrote that the film put Presley "back into the non-dramatic, purely escapist light musical vein," adding, "Essentially, Presley plays himself in the breezy sea session. He handles the role capably, though one would hardly expect a hardened fisherman to be as soft, smooth and white as the one Presley depicts. The character has little depth, but he is pleasant." The Monthly Film Bulletin wrote that the songs were "strung very pleasantly on a story-line of disarming simplicity and bedded comfortably in a stretch of gently fizzing repartee." Margaret Harford of the Los Angeles Times called it "no better or worse than previous Elvis epics." American-based Jewish magazine The Forward has acknowledged that the film's song "The Walls Have Ears," also translated as "Vent hobn oyern," referred to a Yiddish phrase which warns how "someone's always listening."

=== Awards and nominations ===
- Golden Globes: Nominated for Best Motion Picture - Musical at the 1963 ceremony. The winner that year was The Music Man. Elvis Presley received a 2nd place Laurel Award for the best male performance in a musical for his acting role in this movie.

=== Box office ===
Girls! Girls! Girls! earned $2,600,000 at the box office in the United States.

== See also ==
- List of American films of 1962
