= Double Dynamite (album) =

Compilation album by Elvis Presley
- Released: December 1975
- Genre: Rock
- Label: Pickwick Records

Elvis Presley chronology
Today (1975)	Double Dynamite (1975)	Elvis: A Legendary Performer Volume 2 (1976)

Professional ratings
Review scores
Source	Rating
Allmusic	2/5 stars

Double Dynamite is a compilation album by American singer and musician Elvis Presley. The album was released in December 1975, and compiles various tracks that had previously been released on nine budget-priced albums on the RCA Camden label. This was also among the first albums issued by Pickwick after gaining reissue rights to the RCA Camden catalog earlier that year. It was certified Gold and Platinum on 1/6/2004 by the RIAA.

== Reissues and Foreign releases ==
The album was also issued by Pickwick in Great Britain and by RCA itself in Australia, under the title "The Elvis Explosion". Both the Great Britain and Australian issues add two songs not on the US release: "Tender Feeling" and "Charro".

In 1982, in conjunction with Pair Records, RCA Special Products reissued this album with two fewer songs ("You'll Never Walk Alone" and "If You Think I Don't Need You"), plus new cover artwork. Five years later, this 16-song version was issued on CD.

== Track listing ==
Side one
No.	Title	Writer(s)	Length
1.	"Burning Love" (from Burning Love and Hits from His Movies, Volume 2)	Dennis Linde	2:49
2.	"I'll Be There" (from Let's Be Friends)	Bobby Darin	2:23
3.	"Fools Fall In Love" (from I Got Lucky)	Jerry Leiber and Mike Stoller	2:04
4.	"Follow That Dream" (from C'mon Everybody)	Ben Weisman, Fred Wise	1:37
5.	"You'll Never Walk Alone" (from You'll Never Walk Alone)	Richard Rodgers, Oscar Hammerstein II	2:40

Side two
No.	Title	Writer(s)	Length
1.	"Flaming Star" (from Elvis Sings Flaming Star)	Sherman Edwards, Sid Wayne	2:24
2.	"The Yellow Rose of Texas" / "Eyes of Texas"" (from Elvis Sings Flaming Star)	Traditional	2:55
3.	"Old Shep" (from Separate Ways)	Willis Arthur, Red Foley	4:12
4.	"Mama" (from Let's Be Friends)	Charles O'Curran, Dudley Brooks	2:14

Side three
No.	Title	Writer(s)	Length
1.	"Rubberneckin'" (from Almost in Love)	Dory Jones, Bunny Warren	2:12
2.	"U.S. Male" (from Almost in Love)	Jerry Reed	2:41
3.	"Frankie and Johnny" (from Elvis Sings Hits from His Movies, Volume 1)	Traditional	2:31
4.	"If You Think I Don't Need You" (from I Got Lucky)	Red West	2:04
5.	"Easy Come, Easy Go" (from C'mon Everybody)	Ben Weisman, Sid Wayne	2:10

Side four
No.	Title	Writer(s)	Length
1.	"Separate Ways" (from Separate Ways)	Red West, Richard Mainegra	2:36
2.	"Peace in the Valley" (from You'll Never Walk Alone)	Thomas A. Dorsey	3:20
3.	"Big Boss Man" (from Elvis Sings Hits from His Movies, Volume 1)	Luther Dixon, Al Smith	2:48
4.	"It's a Matter of Time" (from Burning Love and Hits From His Movies, Volume 2)	Clive Westlake	3:04
