= List of accolades received by Elvis Presley =

Elvis Presley awards and nominations
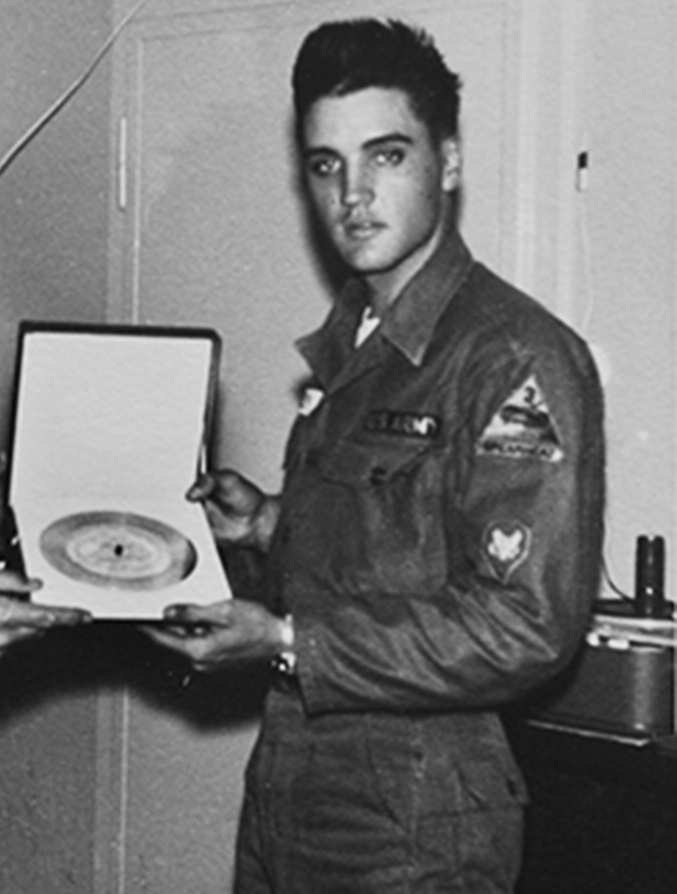
- Elvis Presley receiving a Gold record award for the sales of King Creole in Sweden (c. 1959)
Awards and nominations
Award	Wins	Nominations
ASCAP Award	1	1
Academy of Country Music Awards	0	3
American Music Awards	1	1
Bravo Otto Awards	1	2
Golden Laurel Awards	3	4
Grammy Awards	3	15
Japan Gold Disc Awards	1	1
NME Awards	26	26
Melody Maker Awards	12	14
Photoplay Gold Medal Awards	5	5
The Recording Academy	1	1

Totals (Note: Certain award groups do not simply award one winner. They acknowledge several different recipients, have runners-up, and have third place. Since this is a specific recognition and is different from losing an award, runner-up mentions are considered wins in this award tally. For simplification and to avoid errors, each award in this list has been presumed to have had a prior nomination.)
- Wins: 224
- Nominations: 409

Elvis Presley (1935–1977) was an American singer and actor who has received many awards and nominations during his lifetime and posthumously, for his work in music and film, his charitable endeavours, and military career. Known as the "King of Rock and Roll", Presley is one of the best-selling music artists ever.

Elvis Presley first gained recognition in the industry, when topped categories of "most promising" in various trade publications and consumer poll between 1954 and 1955. Beginning in 1956, Presley won various accolades at the international level, including consecutive World's Top Male Artist awards from British music magazines Melody Maker and New Musical Express (NME), becoming the most awarded artist in the NME Awards with 26 trophies won between 1956 and 1972. Presley won inaugural NARM Best Selling Awards in 1959, and eventually became the most awarded pop male artist in its history. The same year, he received his first of 14 Grammy Awards nominations, winning a total of 3 awards in competitive categories during his life. In 1971, he was honored with a Grammy Lifetime Achievement Award. Presley was posthumously recognized for his contributions with the first retrospective American Music Award of Merit in 1987, and the first Golden Hat Award by the Blues Music Awards in 1984. He won additional awards for his performance in films, including Laurel Awards and Photoplay Gold Medal Awards, while became the first "Double-Triple crown" winner in the history of Billboard charts in 1956. He is recognized by the Guinness World Records as being the highest selling solo artist in history.

Presley is known for having been admitted into various halls. He was recognized by the Guinness World Records in 2001, as the first performer to have ever been inducted into three different major music Hall of Fames: the Rock and Roll (1986), the Country Music (1998), and the Gospel Music Hall of Fame (2001). He was also admitted at the Rockabilly (1997), Christian (2006) and Rhythm & Blues (2016) Hall of Fames. Library of Congress' National Film Registry and National Recording Registry as well as the Grammy Hall of Fame have preserved various of his works due to their historical significance. In addition, Graceland was listed by the National Historic Landmark and National Register of Historic Places.

Described by the White House as an "enduring American icon", Presley was recognized with various civil awards and decorations, including the Presidential Medal of Freedom (highest U.S. civilian award) by U.S. president Donald Trump in 2018. As of 1961, Presley was bestowed with eleven honorary citizenship certificates, and at least 13 U.S. states proclaimed the "Elvis Presley Day" as of 1980; a nationwide group was organized to attempt to establish the National "Elvis Presley Day", with Democratic congressman Harold Ford Sr. filling out a resolution to U.S Congress for its consideration. Presley received a number of honorary law enforcement titles. In the mid-1950s, Mississippi Gov. James P. Coleman awarded him with a "scroll of honor" presenting a certificate calling him "American's No. 1 entertainer in the field of popular music", in addition to be called a favorite son.

Towards the end of the 20th century, Elvis Presley was named as the "Entertainer of the Century" by TV Guide and other publications. The Recording Industry Association of America (RIAA) also named him the Top Selling Male Rock Artist of the Century. According to SoundExchange in 2013, a performance rights organization that collects royalties from more than 2,000 digital music services, Presley ranked as the most frequently streamed artist of the past decade.

== Awards and nominations ==
Award/organization (Note: Charts are not included, unless they are explicitly described as "awards" or specific trophies are given.)	Year	Nominee/work	Category	Result	Ref.
Academy of Country Music Awards	1970	"Don't Cry Daddy"	Single Record of the Year	Nominated	
Academy of Country Music Awards	1971	Elvis Presley	Entertainer of the Year	Nominated	
Academy of Country Music Awards	1978	Moody Blue	Album of the Year	Nominated	
American Bandstand Poll Best Record Award	1957	"All Shook Up"	Best Record of the Year	Won	
American Bandstand Poll Best Record Award	1957	Elvis Presley	Best Male Singer	Won	
American Bandstand Poll Best Record Award	1958	"One Night"	Best Record of the Year	Won	
American Bandstand Poll Best Record Award	1958	Elvis Presley	Best Male Singer	Won	
American Bandstand Poll Best Record Award	1959	"My Wish Came True"	Best Record of the Year	Won	
American Bandstand Poll Best Record Award	1959	Elvis Presley	Best Male Singer	Won	
American Bandstand Poll Best Record Award	1960	"It's Now or Never"	Best Record of the Year	Won	
American Bandstand Poll Best Record Award	1960	Elvis Presley	Best Male Singer	Won	
American Bandstand Poll Best Record Award	1961	Elvis Presley	Best Male Singer	Won	
American Bandstand Poll Best Record Award	1962	Elvis Presley	Best Male Singer	Won	
American Music Awards	1987	Elvis Presley	Award of Merit	Honoree	
American Music Awards	2000	Elvis Presley	Favorite Artist of the Decade: 1950s (Fan vote)	Honoree	
Amusement & Music Operators Association (AMOA)	1962	Elvis Presley	Most Popular Juke Box Artist of the Year	Runner-up	
Amusement & Music Operators Association (AMOA)	1980	Elvis Presley	Jukebox Music Awards: Best All Time Favorite Artist	Honoree	
Amusement & Music Operators Association (AMOA)	1989	Elvis Presley	Legends of the Jukebox	Honoree	
Associated-Rediffusion Close-Up Award	1962	Elvis Presley	Best Actor of the Year	Won	
ASCAP Gospel Music Awards	1977	Elvis Presley	Special award	Honoree	
Automaten markt (Germany) (Note: A German coin magazine (c. 1951), then a leading paper of the world coin machine industry, according to Billboard.)	1962	Elvis Presley	Jukebox Awards: Top Most Played Male Vocalist	2nd place	
Automaten markt (Germany)	1963	Elvis Presley	Jukebox Awards: Top Male Vocalists	Won	
Australian Go-Set Awards	1966	Elvis Presley	International Male Vocalist	Won	
Australian Go-Set Awards	1967	Elvis Presley	International Male Vocalist	2nd place	
Australian Go-Set Awards	1968	Elvis Presley	International Male Vocalist	3rd place	
Australian Go-Set Awards	1969	Elvis Presley	International Male Vocalist	2nd place	
Australian Go-Set Awards	1970	Elvis Presley	International Male Vocalist	2nd place	
Australian Go-Set Awards	1970	Elvis Presley	International Male — Guitarist	Nominated	
Australian Go-Set Awards	1971	Elvis Presley	International Male Vocalist	Won	
Australian Go-Set Awards	1971	That's the Way It Is	Best International Album	Nominated	
Australian Go-Set Awards	1972	Elvis Presley	International Male Vocalist	3rd place	
Australian Go-Set Awards	1972	As Recorded at Madison Square Garden	Best International Album	Nominated	
Bravo Otto Awards	1960	Elvis Presley	Best Male Singer	Bronze	
Bravo Otto Awards	1963	Elvis Presley	Best Male Singer	4th place	
Berlingske-Tidende Poll Awards (Denmark)	1962	Elvis Presley	Top Selling Record Artists of the Year	Won	
Billboard Disk Jockey Poll Awards	1954	Elvis Presley	Most Promising	Nominated	
Billboard Disk Jockey Poll Awards	1955	Elvis Presley	Most Promising New Country and Western Artist	Won	
Billboard Disk Jockey Poll Awards	1955	Elvis Presley	Best New Single (Country and Western Jamboree)	Won	
Billboard Disk Jockey Poll Awards	1955	Elvis Presley	Most Promising Country and Western Artist	Won	
Billboard Disk Jockey Poll Awards	1956	Elvis Presley	Most-Played Male Vocalist	Won	
Billboard Disk Jockey Poll Awards	1956	"Don't Be Cruel"	Favorite Record	Nominated	
Billboard Disk Jockey Poll Awards	1956	"Don't Be Cruel"	Most-Played Record	Nominated	
Billboard Disk Jockey Poll Awards	1956	"Heartbreak Hotel"	Most-Played Record	Nominated	
Billboard Disk Jockey Poll Awards	1956	"Hound Dog"	Most-Played Record	Nominated	
Billboard Disk Jockey Poll Awards	1960	Elvis Presley	Most Played Vocalist	Nominated	
Billboard Disk Jockey Poll Awards	1962	Elvis Presley	Most Popular Artist on Jukeboxs	2nd place	
Billboard Disk Jockey Poll Awards	1965	Elvis Presley	Favorite Male Vocalist — Singles	Won	
Billboard Number One Awards (Year-End Awards)	1971	Elvis Presley	Top Singles Artist	Nominated	
Billboard Number One Awards (Year-End Awards)	1971	Elvis Presley	Top Album Artist	Nominated	
Billboard Number One Awards (Year-End Awards)	1971	Elvis Presley	Top Singles Males Vocalist	Nominated	
Billboard Number One Awards (Year-End Awards)	1971	Elvis Presley	Top Singles Countries Vocalist	Nominated	
Billboard Number One Awards (Year-End Awards)	1971	Elvis Presley	Top Singles Easy Listening Artist	Nominated	
Billboard Number One Awards (Year-End Awards)	1971	Elvis Presley	Top Album Male Vocalist	Nominated	
Billboard Number One Awards (Year-End Awards)	1971	Elvis Presley	Top Album Country Vocalist	Nominated	
Billboard Number One Awards (Year-End Awards)	1971	Elvis Presley	Top Album Country Vocalist	Nominated	
Billboard Number One Awards (Year-End Awards)	1971	"I Really Don't Want to Know"	Top Easy Listening Single	Nominated	
Billboard Number One Awards (Year-End Awards)	1971	Elvis Country	Top Country Album	Nominated	
Billboard Number One Awards (Year-End Awards)	1971	That's the Way It Is	Top Country Album	Nominated	
Billboard Number One Awards (Year-End Awards)	1972	Elvis Presley	Top Singles Artist	Nominated	
Billboard Number One Awards (Year-End Awards)	1972	Elvis Presley	Top Album Artist	Nominated	
Billboard Number One Awards (Year-End Awards)	1972	Elvis Presley	Top Singles Male Vocalist	Nominated	
Billboard Number One Awards (Year-End Awards)	1972	Elvis Presley	Top Singles Easy Listening Artist	Nominated	
Billboard Number One Awards (Year-End Awards)	1972	Elvis Presley	Top Album Male Vocalist	Nominated	
Billboard Number One Awards (Year-End Awards)	1972	Elvis Presley	Top Album Country Artist	Nominated	
Billboard Number One Awards (Year-End Awards)	1972	"Burning Love"	Top Pop 100 Single	Nominated	
Billboard Number One Awards (Year-End Awards)	1972	Elvis Live at Madison Square Garden	Top Popular Album	Nominated	
Billboard Number One Awards (Year-End Awards)	1973	Elvis Presley	Top Singles Artist	Nominated	
Billboard Number One Awards (Year-End Awards)	1973	Elvis Presley	Top Album Artist	Nominated	
Billboard Number One Awards (Year-End Awards)	1973	Elvis Presley	Top Singles Male Vocalist	Nominated	
Billboard Number One Awards (Year-End Awards)	1973	Elvis Presley	Top Singles Easy Listening Artists	Nominated	
Billboard Number One Awards (Year-End Awards)	1973	Elvis Presley	Top Album Male Artist	Nominated	
Billboard Number One Awards (Year-End Awards)	1973	Elvis Presley	Top Album Country Artist	Nominated	
Billboard Number One Awards (Year-End Awards)	1973	"Separate Ways"	Top Easy Listening Single	Nominated	
Billboard Number One Awards (Year-End Awards)	1973	Aloha from Hawaii via Satellite	Top Popular Album	Nominated	
Billboard Number One Awards (Year-End Awards)	1973	Aloha from Hawaii via Satellite	Top Country Album	Nominated	
Billboard Number One Awards (Year-End Awards)	1973	Burning Love and Hits from His Movies, Volume 2	Top Country Album	Nominated	
Billboard Number One Awards (Year-End Awards)	1974	Elvis Presley	Top Pop Singles Male Vocalist	Nominated	
Billboard Number One Awards (Year-End Awards)	1974	Elvis Presley	Top Pop Album Artist	Nominated	
Billboard Number One Awards (Year-End Awards)	1974	Elvis Presley	Top Pop Album Male Artist	Nominated	
Billboard Number One Awards (Year-End Awards)	1974	Elvis Presley	Top Country Singles Artist	Nominated	
Billboard Number One Awards (Year-End Awards)	1974	Elvis Presley	Top Country Album Artist	Nominated	
Billboard Number One Awards (Year-End Awards)	1974	Elvis Presley	Top Easy Listening Singles Artist	Nominated	
Billboard Number One Awards (Year-End Awards)	1974	Elvis: A Legendary Performer Volume 1	Top Country Album	Nominated	
Billboard Number One Awards (Year-End Awards)	1975	Elvis Presley	Pop Singles Male Artist	Nominated	
Billboard Number One Awards (Year-End Awards)	1975	Elvis Presley	Country Singles Male Artist	Nominated	
Billboard Number One Awards (Year-End Awards)	1975	Elvis Presley	Country Album Artist	Nominated	
Billboard Number One Awards (Year-End Awards)	1975	Elvis Presley	Easy Listening Artist	Nominated	
Billboard Number One Awards (Year-End Awards)	1975	"My Boy"	Easy Listening Song	Nominated	
Billboard Number One Awards (Year-End Awards)	1975	Promised Land	Top Country Album	Nominated	
Billboard Number One Awards (Year-End Awards)	1976	Elvis Presley	Top Album Artist	Nominated	
Billboard Number One Awards (Year-End Awards)	1976	Elvis Presley	Top Country Album Artist	Nominated	
Billboard Number One Awards (Year-End Awards)	1976	From Elvis Presley Boulevard, Memphis, Tennessee	Top Country Album	Nominated	
Billboard Number One Awards (Year-End Awards)	1976	The Sun Sessions	Top Country Album	Nominated	
Billboard Number One Awards (Year-End Awards)	1977	Elvis Presley	Pop Male Artist	Nominated	
Billboard Number One Awards (Year-End Awards)	1977	Elvis Presley	Country Male Artist	Nominated	
Billboard Number One Awards (Year-End Awards)	1977	Elvis Presley	Country Singles Artist	Nominated	
Billboard Number One Awards (Year-End Awards)	1977	Elvis Presley	Country Album Artist	Nominated	
Billboard Number One Awards (Year-End Awards)	1977	Elvis Presley	Pop Singles Artist	Nominated	
Billboard Number One Awards (Year-End Awards)	1977	Elvis Presley	Pop Album Artist	Nominated	
Billboard Number One Awards (Year-End Awards)	1977	Elvis Presley	Pop Album Male Artist	Nominated	
Billboard Number One Awards (Year-End Awards)	1977	Elvis Presley	Pop Producer (No. of charted singles)	Nominated	
Billboard Number One Awards (Year-End Awards)	1977	Elvis Presley	Easy Listening Singles Artist	Nominated	
Billboard Number One Awards (Year-End Awards)	1977	Elvis Presley	Top Arena Artist	Won	
Billboard Number One Awards (Year-End Awards)	1977	Moody Blue	Country Album	Nominated	
Billboard Number One Awards (Year-End Awards)	1977	Welcome to My World	Country Album	Nominated	
Billboard Number One Awards (Year-End Awards)	1977	"Way Down"	Country Single	Nominated	
Billboard Number One Awards (Year-End Awards)	1977	"Moody Blue/"She Thinks I Still Care"	Country Single	Nominated	
Billboard Number One Awards (Year-End Awards)	1977	"Way Down"	Pop Single	Nominated	
Billboard Number One Awards (Year-End Awards)	1977	"Way Down"	Easy Listening Single	Nominated	
Billboard Number One Awards (Year-End Awards)	1977	"Moody Blue"	Easy Listening Single	Nominated	
Billboard Number One Awards (Year-End Awards)	1978	Elvis Presley	Pop Male Artist	Nominated	
Billboard Number One Awards (Year-End Awards)	1978	Elvis Presley	Pop Album Artist	Nominated	
Billboard Number One Awards (Year-End Awards)	1978	Elvis Presley	Pop Male Album Artist	Nominated	
Billboard Number One Awards (Year-End Awards)	1978	Elvis Presley	Country Artist	Nominated	
Billboard Number One Awards (Year-End Awards)	1978	Elvis Presley	Country Album Artist	Won	
Billboard Number One Awards (Year-End Awards)	1978	Elvis in Concert	Country Album	Nominated	
Billboard Number One Awards (Year-End Awards)	1978	Moody Blue	Country Album	Nominated	
Billboard Number One Awards (Year-End Awards)	1978	He Walks Beside Me	Country Album	Nominated	
Billboard Number One Awards (Year-End Awards)	1978	How Great Thou Art	Country Album	Nominated	
Billboard Number One Awards (Year-End Awards)	1978	Elvis Sings for Children and Grownups Too	Country Album	Nominated	
Billboard Number One Awards (Year-End Awards)	1978	"My Way"	Top Country Single	Nominated	
Billboard Number One Awards (Year-End Awards)	1979	Elvis Presley	Top Overal Country Artist	Nominated	
Billboard Number One Awards (Year-End Awards)	1979	Elvis Presley	Top Album Artist	Nominated	
Billboard Number One Awards (Year-End Awards)	1979	Our Memories of Elvis	Top Album	Nominated	
Billboard Number One Awards (Year-End Awards)	1979	Elvis: A Legendary Performer Volume 3	Top Album	Nominated	
Billboard Number One Awards (Year-End Awards)	1980	Elvis Presley	Top Album Artist	Nominated	
Billboard Trendsetter Awards	1974	Elvis Presley	For creating the first worldwide TV concert which was streamed via satellite to 1.5 billion persons	Won	
BMI R&B Awards	1958 (Note: Although "Jailhouse Rock" also won an award in 1958, Presley is not credited as writer/co-writer)	"All Shook Up"	Citations of Achievements	Won	
Cash Box Disk Jockey Poll Awards	1965	Elvis Presley	Most Programmed Artist on Radio	Won	
Cash Box Disk Jockey Poll Awards	1957	Elvis	Most Programmed Album of the Year	Won	
Cash Box Year-End Awards	1965	Elvis Presley	Top Male Vocalist	Won	
Cash Box Year-End Awards	1965	Elvis Presley	Top Male Vocalist — Album	Won	
Discomanía Awards (Spain)	1963	Elvis Presley	Gold Disk Award: Foreign Singer	3rd place	
Disc Readers' Choice Awards	1968	Elvis Presley	World's Top Male Singer	3rd place	
Disc Readers' Choice Awards	1972	Elvis Presley	Top International Male Singer	Won	
Disco Revue (France)	1962	Elvis Presley	Best r&r Foreign Artists	Won	
DownBeat Awards	1955	Elvis Presley	Best New Artist	Won	
DownBeat Awards	1957	Elvis Presley	Top Recording Personality of the last Year	3rd place	
DownBeat Awards	1958	Elvis Presley	Best Male Singer	5th place	
Edison Award	1970	Worldwide 50 Gold Award Hits Vol. 1	Best Pop Music	Nominated	
Encore Awards	1977	Elvis Presley	Entertainer of the Year Award	Won	
Encore Awards	1978	Elvis Presley	Entertainer of the Year Award	Won	
Encore Awards	1978	Elvis Presley	Special award for music	Honoree	
Fashion Group International	2022	Elvis Presley	Fashion Oracle Award	Won	
GeeGee Poll Awards	1962	Elvis Presley	Best Musical Movie Actor	Won	
GeeGee Poll Awards	1963	Elvis Presley	Best Musical Movie Actor	Won	
GeeGee Poll Awards	1964	Elvis Presley	Best Musical Movie Actor	Won	
GeeGee Poll Awards	1965	Elvis Presley	Best Musical Movie Actor	Won	
Golden Apple Award	1960	Elvis Presley	Sour Apple	Won	
Golden Apple Award	1966	Elvis Presley	Sour Apple	Won	
Golden Boot Awards (Note: Don't confuse with the Golden Boot Awards (1983-2007). RCA Golden Boot Awards recognized country music artists with outstanding sales, or whose singles record attained a No. 1 position in two or more of chart records.)	1974	"Raised on Rock / For Ol' Times Sake"	Hit Single	Won	
Golden Boot Awards	1974	Elvis Recorded Live on Stage in Memphis	Hit Album	Won	
Golden Boot Awards	1974	A Legendary Performer, Vol. 1	Hit Album	Won	
Golden Boot Awards	1974	A Legendary Performer, Vol. 2	Hit Album	Won	
Golden Boot Awards	1974	Good Times	Hit Album	Won	
Golden Boot Awards	1974	"Help Me"	Hit Single	Won	
Golden Boot Awards	1974	"It's Midnight"	Hit Single	Won	
Golden Boot Awards	1974	"I've Got a Thing About You Baby"	Hit Single	Won	
Golden Boot Awards	1976	From Elvis Presley Boulevard, Memphis, Tennessee	Hit Album	Won	
Golden Boot Awards	1976	The Sun Sessions	Hit Album	Won	
Golden Boot Awards	1977	Moody Blue	Hit Album	Won	
Golden Boot Awards	1977	"Moody Blue"	Hit Single	Won	
Golden Boot Awards	1977	"Way Down"	Hit Single	Won	
Golden Boot Awards	1977	Welcome to My World	Hit Album	Won	
Golden Boot Awards	1978	"My Way"	Hit Single	Won	
Golden Boot Awards	1978	Elvis Sings for Children	Hit Album	Won	
Golden Boot Awards	1978	He Walks Beside Me	Hit Album	Won	
Golden Boot Awards	1978	Elvis in Concert	Hit Album	Won	
Golden Laurel Awards	1962	Elvis Presley	Best Actor of the Year	2nd place	
Golden Laurel Awards	1963	Elvis Presley	Top Ten Name Power Star	Won	
Golden Laurel Awards	1965	Elvis Presley	Top Five Musical Star	Won	
Golden Laurel Awards	1966	Elvis Presley	Best Male Performance in a Musical Film	Won	
Grammy Awards	1959	"A Big Hunk o' Love"	Best R&B Performance	Nominated	
Grammy Awards	1959	"A Big Hunk o' Love"	Best Performance By A "Top 40" Artist	Nominated	
Grammy Awards	1959	"A Fool Such as I"	Record of the Year	Nominated	
Grammy Awards	1961	"Are You Lonesome Tonight?"	Record of the Year	Nominated	
Grammy Awards	1961	"Are You Lonesome Tonight?"	Best Performance By A Pop Single Artist	Nominated	
Grammy Awards	1961	"Are You Lonesome Tonight?"	Best Vocal Performance Single Record Or Track, Male	Nominated	
Grammy Awards	1961	G.I. Blues	Best Sound Track Album or Recording of Original Cast From a Motion Picture or Television	Nominated	
Grammy Awards	1961	G.I. Blues	Best Male Pop Vocal Performance	Nominated	
Grammy Awards	1962	Blue Hawaii	Best Sound Track Album or Recording of Original Cast From a Motion Picture or Television	Nominated	
Grammy Awards	1968	How Great Thou Art	Best Sacred Performance	Won	
Grammy Awards	1969	You'll Never Walk Alone	Best Sacred Performance	Nominated	
Grammy Awards	1971	Elvis Presley	Grammy Lifetime Achievement Award	Honoree	
Grammy Awards	1973	He Touched Me	Best Inspirational Performance	Won	
Grammy Awards	1975	"How Great Thou Art"	Best Inspirational Performance (Non-Classical)	Won	
Grammy Awards	1979	"Softly, as I Leave You"	Best Country Vocal Performance, Male	Nominated	
Hungarian Music Awards	2004	Elvis: 2nd to None	Foreign Rock Album	Nominated	
International Film Music Academy Awards	1976	Elvis Presley	Achievements Overdue	Honoree	
Japan Gold Disc Awards	1973	Elvis Presley	Best Recording Artist of 1972	Won	
Juke Box magazine (Belgium)	1963	Elvis Presley	Most Popular International Male Artist	Won	
KAKC Awards	1958	"Jailhouse Rock"	Top 10 Tunes	Won	
KAKC Awards	1958	"All Shook Up"	Top 10 Tunes	Won	
Las Vegas Entertainment Awards (Note: An award established in 1971.)	1977	Elvis Presley	Male Musical Star of the Year	Won	
Melody Maker Readers' Poll Awards	1956	Elvis Presley	World's Top Male Artist	Won	
Melody Maker Readers' Poll Awards	1957	Elvis Presley	World's Top Male Artist	Won	
Melody Maker Readers' Poll Awards	1958	Elvis Presley	World's Top Male Artist	Won	
Melody Maker Readers' Poll Awards	1959	Elvis Presley	World's Top Male Artist	Won	
Melody Maker Readers' Poll Awards	1960	Elvis Presley	World's Top Male Artist	Won	
Melody Maker Readers' Poll Awards	1961	Elvis Presley	World's Top Male Artist	Won	
Melody Maker Readers' Poll Awards	1962	Elvis Presley	World's Top Male Artist	Won	
Melody Maker Readers' Poll Awards	1963	Elvis Presley	World's Top Male Artist	Won	
Melody Maker Readers' Poll Awards	1964	Elvis Presley	World's Top Male Artist	Won	
Melody Maker Readers' Poll Awards	1965	Elvis Presley	World's Top Male Artist	Won	
Melody Maker Readers' Poll Awards	1966	Elvis Presley	World's Top Male Artist	Won	
Melody Maker Readers' Poll Awards	1967	Elvis Presley	World's Top Male Artist	2nd place	
Melody Maker Readers' Poll Awards	1967	"Indescribably Blue"	International Single Disc	Nominated	
Melody Maker Readers' Poll Awards	1967	How Great Thou Art	International LP	Nominated	
Memphis Music Awards	1971	Elvis Presley	Founder's Award	Won	
Memphis Music Awards	1971	Elvis Presley	Outstanding Male Vocalist 1969/70	Nominated	
Memphis Music Awards	1971	"Suspicious Minds"	Most Outstanding Record 1969/70	Won	
Memphis Music Awards	1971	From Elvis in Memphis	Most Outstanding Album 1969/70	Nominated	
Music Business Year-End Awards	1964	Elvis Presley	Top Male Vocalist — Single Records	2nd place	
Music City News Awards	1978	Moody Blue	Album of the Year	Won	
Music Operators of America (MOA) Juke Box Operator Poll Awards	1956	Elvis Presley	Favorite Artist (Western)	Won	
Music Operators of America (MOA) Juke Box Operator Poll Awards	1956	Elvis Presley	Favorite Artist (Country)	Won	
Music Operators of America (MOA) Juke Box Operator Poll Awards	1956	"I Forgot to Remember to Forget"	Favorite Country (Song)	Won	
Music Operators of America (MOA) Juke Box Operator Poll Awards	1962	Elvis Presley	Best Artist of the Year	Nominated	
Muziek Parade Awards (Netherlands)	1964	Elvis Presley	International Male Singer	Won	
Musikparade Readers' Choice Awards (Germany)	1963	Elvis Presley	Favorite Male Singer Locally	Won	
Napster Awards	2006	Elvis Presley	Unstoppable Artist — Germany	Won	
NARM Best Seller Awards	1959	Elvis Presley	Best Selling Male Artist	Won	
NARM Best Seller Awards	1960	Elvis Presley	Best Selling Male Artist	Won	
NARM Best Seller Awards	1960	"Are You Lonesome Tonight?"	Best Selling Single Record	Won	
NARM Best Seller Awards	1960	A Touch of Gold Vol. 2	Best Selling Extended Play Record	Won	
NARM Best Seller Awards	1961	Elvis Presley	Best Selling Male Artist	Won	
NARM Best Seller Awards	1961	Blue Hawaii	Best Selling LP	Won	
NARM Best Seller Awards	1961	G.I. Blues	Best Selling LP	Nominated	
NARM Best Seller Awards	1962	Elvis Presley	Best Selling Male Vocalist	Won	
NARM Best Seller Awards	1962	Blue Hawaii	Best Selling LP	Won	
NARM Best Seller Awards	1962	"Return to Sender"	Best Selling Hit Single Record	Nominated	
NARM Best Seller Awards	1963	Elvis Presley	Best Selling Male Artist	Won	
NARM Best Seller Awards	1965	Elvis Presley	Best Selling Male Artist	Won	
NARM Best Seller Awards	1966	Elvis Presley	Best Selling Male Vocalist	Won	
NARM Best Seller Awards	1966	"Crying in the Chapel"	Best Selling Hit Single Record	Nominated	
NARM Best Seller Awards	1972	Burning Love	Best Selling Economy Album	Won	
NARM Best Seller Awards	1973	Burning Love	Best Selling Economy Album	Won	
NARM Best Seller Awards	1974	Elvis Presley	Best Selling Economy Album	Won	
NARM Best Seller Awards	1977	Moody Blue	Best LP by a Male Artist	Nominated	
NARM Best Seller Awards	1977	Moody Blue	Best LP by a Country Male Artist	Nominated	
NARM Best Seller Awards	1977	Elvis' Christmas Album	Best Selling Economy LP	Nominated	
NARM Best Seller Awards	1977	Double Dynamite	Best Selling Economy LP	Nominated	
NARM Best Seller Awards	1977	Pure Gold	Best Selling Economy LP	Nominated	
NARM Best Seller Awards	1978	Elvis' Christmas Album	Best Selling Economy Album	Won	
NARM Best Seller Awards	1978	Moody Blue	Best Selling Album By A Country Artist	Won	
National Association of Rack Merchandisers (NARM)	1961	Elvis Presley	Best Selling Male Artist on the Racks	Won	
National Association of Rack Merchandisers (NARM)	1961	"Are You Lonesome Tonight?"	Best-Selling Single Hit	Won	
National Association of Rack Merchandisers (NARM)	1961	Best-Selling EP	A Touch of Gold Vol. 3	Won	
NME Awards	1957	Elvis Presley	World's Outstanding Musical Personality	Won	
NME Awards	1958	Elvis Presley	World's Outstanding Popular Singer	Won	
NME Awards	1958	Elvis Presley	World's Outstanding Musical Personality	Won	
NME Awards	1958	Elvis Presley	Favourite US Male Singer	Won	
NME Awards	1959	Elvis Presley	World's Outstanding Male Singer	Won	
NME Awards	1959	Elvis Presley	World's Outstanding Musical Personality	Won	
NME Awards	1960	Elvis Presley	World Male Singer	Won	
NME Awards	1961	Elvis Presley	World Musical Personality	Won	
NME Awards	1961	Elvis Presley	World Male Singer	Won	
NME Awards	1962	Elvis Presley	World's Outstanding Male Singer	Won	
NME Awards	1962	Elvis Presley	World's Outstanding Musical Personality	Won	
NME Awards	1963	Elvis Presley	World Musical Personality	Won	
NME Awards	1964	Elvis Presley	Outstanding Male Singer	Won	
NME Awards	1964	Elvis Presley	Outstanding Musical Personality	Won	
NME Awards	1965	Elvis Presley	World Male Singer	Won	
NME Awards	1965	Elvis Presley	World Musical Personality	Won	
NME Awards	1966	Elvis Presley	World Male Singer	Won	
NME Awards	1966	Elvis Presley	World Musical Personality	Won	
NME Awards	1968	Elvis Presley	World Male Singer	Won	
NME Awards	1968	Elvis Presley	World Musical Personality	Won	
NME Awards	1970	Elvis Presley	World's Top Musical Personality	Won	
NME Awards	1970	Elvis Presley	World Male Singer	Won	
NME Awards	1971	Elvis Presley	World's Male Singer	Won	
NME Awards	1971	Elvis Presley	World Musical Personality	Won	
NME Awards	1972	Elvis Presley	World Male Singer	Won	
NME Awards	1972	Elvis Presley	World Musical Personality	Won	
Party magazine Golden Roses Awards (Germany)	1962	Elvis Presley	Most Popular Star	Nominated	
Philippine Record Dealer's Association (PREDA)	1972	Elvis Presley	Top Foreign Male Singer	Won	
Photoplay Gold Medal Awards	1968	Elvis Presley	Most Popular Male Star	Won	
Photoplay Gold Medal Awards	1973	Elvis Presley	Photoplay Editors' Award	Won	
Photoplay Gold Medal Awards	1975	Elvis Presley	Favorite Variety Star	Won	
Photoplay Gold Medal Awards	1976	Elvis Presley	Favorite Variety Star	Won	
Photoplay Gold Medal Awards	1977	Elvis Presley	Favorite Variety Star	Won	
Photoplay Gold Medal Awards	1977	Elvis Presley	Favorite Rock Music Star	Won	
Radio Luxembourg	1964	Elvis Presley	Battle of the Giants Awards	Won	
Radio Luxembourg	1964	Elvis Presley	The Gateway Trophy	Won	
Record Mirror Poll Awards	1974	Elvis Presley	International Male Singer	Won	
Record Mirror Poll Awards	1974	Elvis' 40 Greatest	International Album of the Year	Nominated	
Record World DJ Poll Awards	1965	Elvis Presley	Top Male Vocalist	Won	
Record World DJ Poll Awards	1965	Elvis Presley	Top Album Artist — Folk	Won	
Record World DJ Poll Awards	—N/a	Elvis Presley	Top Male Vocalist, Singles	Won	
Reel Cowboys Silver Spur Awards	2016	Elvis Presley	Golden Spirit Award	Honoree	
RIAA Artists of the Century	1999	Elvis Presley	Top Selling Male Rock Artist of the Century	Honoree	
Screen Silver Cup Awards	1956	Elvis Presley	Most Popular Newcomers of 1956	Won	
Teen magazine	1961	Elvis Presley	Damp Raincoat Award (Most Disappointing Performers of the Year)	Won	
The Recording Academy	1971	Elvis Presley	Grammy Trustees Award	Honoree	
Tuney Tunes Awards (Netherlands)	1959	Elvis Presley	Best Male Vocalist	Nominated	
TV Guide Award	1999	Elvis Presley	Entertainer of the Century	Honoree	
W. C. Handy Awards (Blues Music Awards)	1984	Elvis Presley	Golden Hat Award	Honoree	
WCNT	1956	Elvis Presley	Most Popular Disk Artist	Won	
WHB	1956	Elvis Presley	Most Popular Artist	Won	
WHN-AM Listeners' Choice Awards	1976	Elvis Presley	Most Popular Male Vocalist	Won	
WHN-AM Listeners' Choice Awards	1979	Elvis Presley	Male Vocalist of the Year	2nd place	
WHN-AM Listeners' Choice Awards	1979	Elvis Presley	Entertainer of the Year	2nd place	
WLOB Music Popularity Poll Awards	1958	Elvis Presley	Male Vocalist	Runner-up	
WIRE Top Choice Awards	1978	Elvis Presley	Male Vocalist of the Year	Won	
WSAI Listening Choice Awards	1960	Elvis Presley	Listener's Favorite Artist on Records	Won	
XM Nation Music Awards	2005	Elvis Presley	Icon: 1950s	Honoree	

== Halls of Fame ==
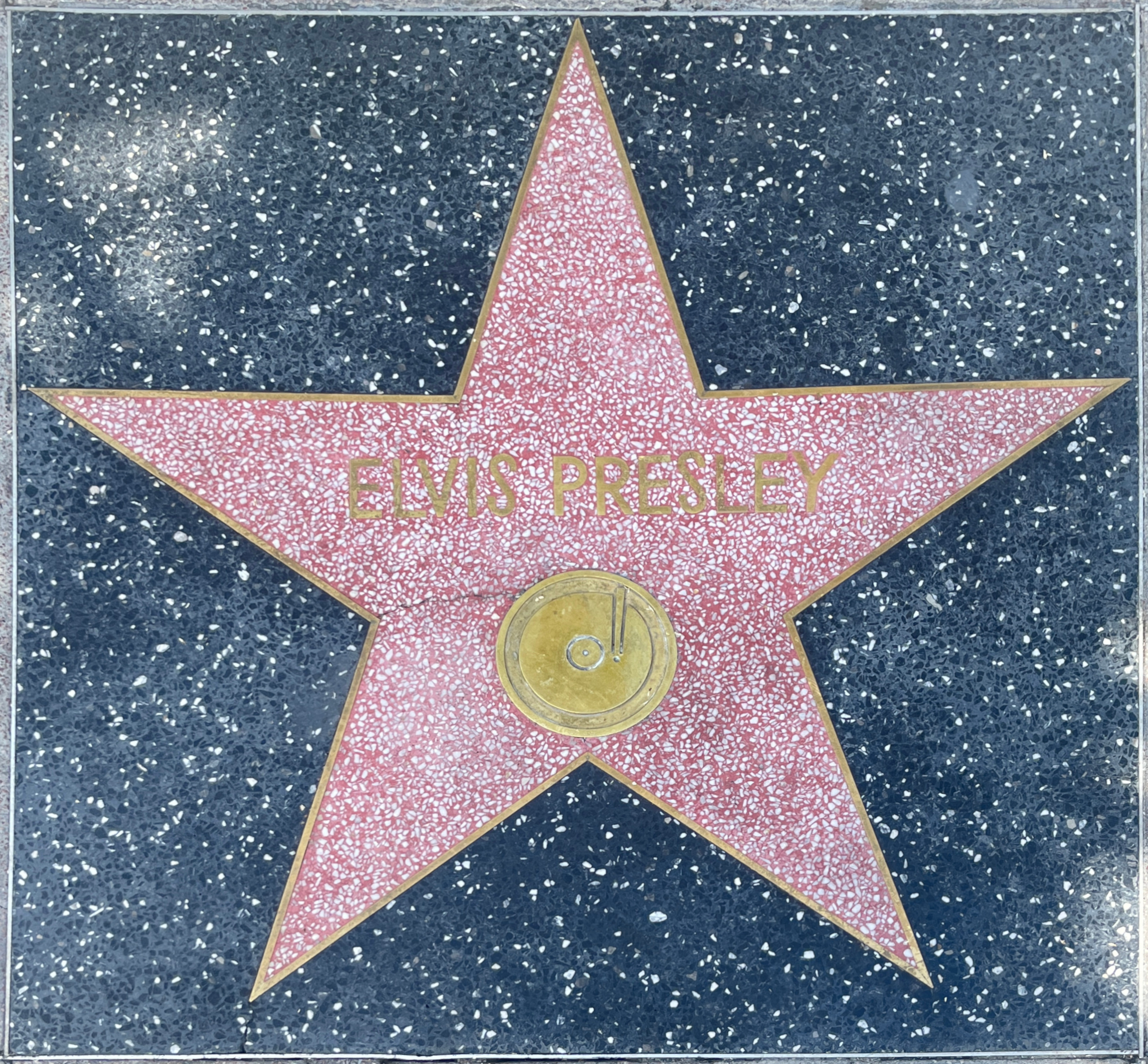
Presley's star on the Hollywood Walk of Fame at 6777 Hollywood Boulevard

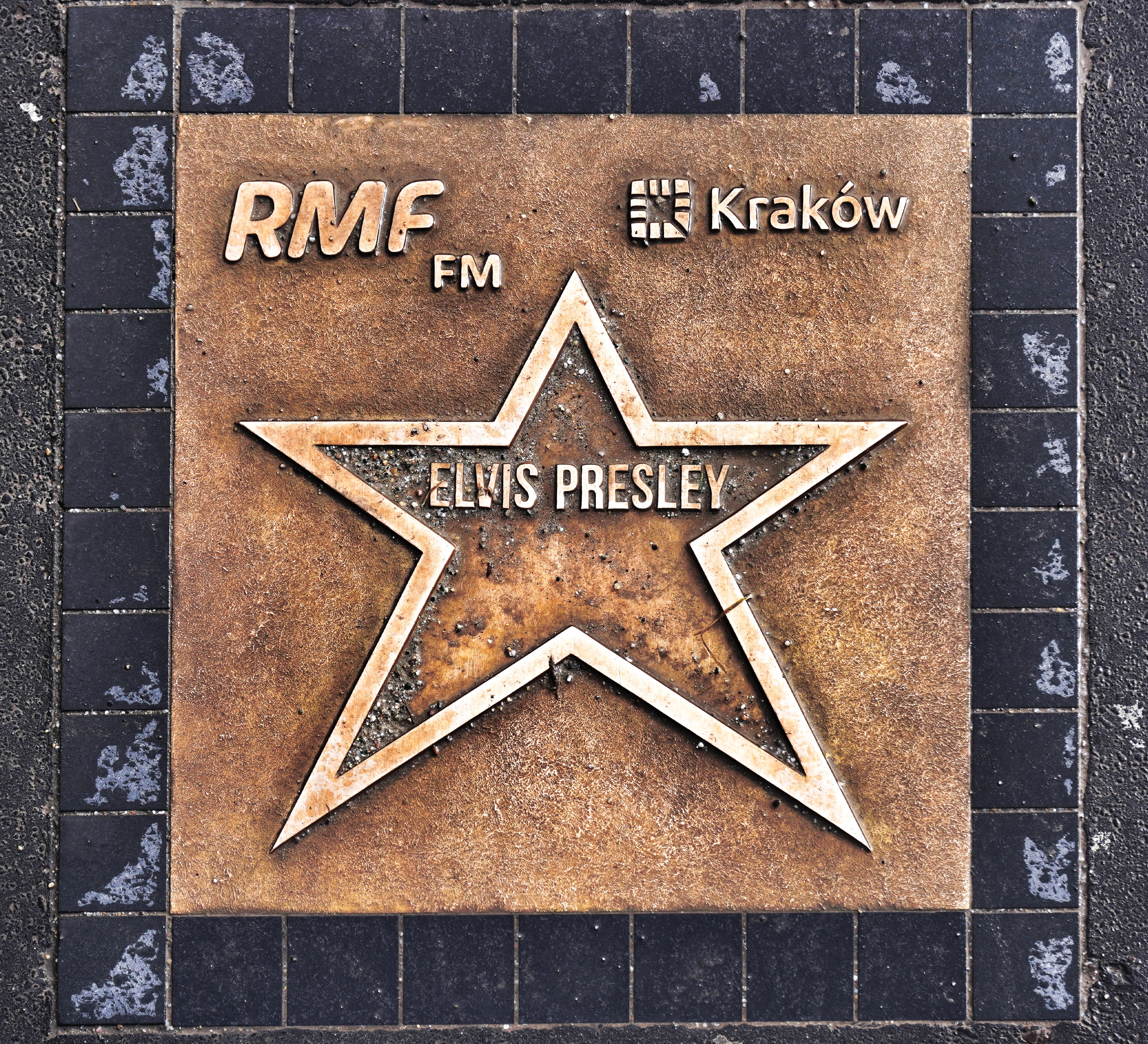
Presley's star on Kraków's Walk of Fame

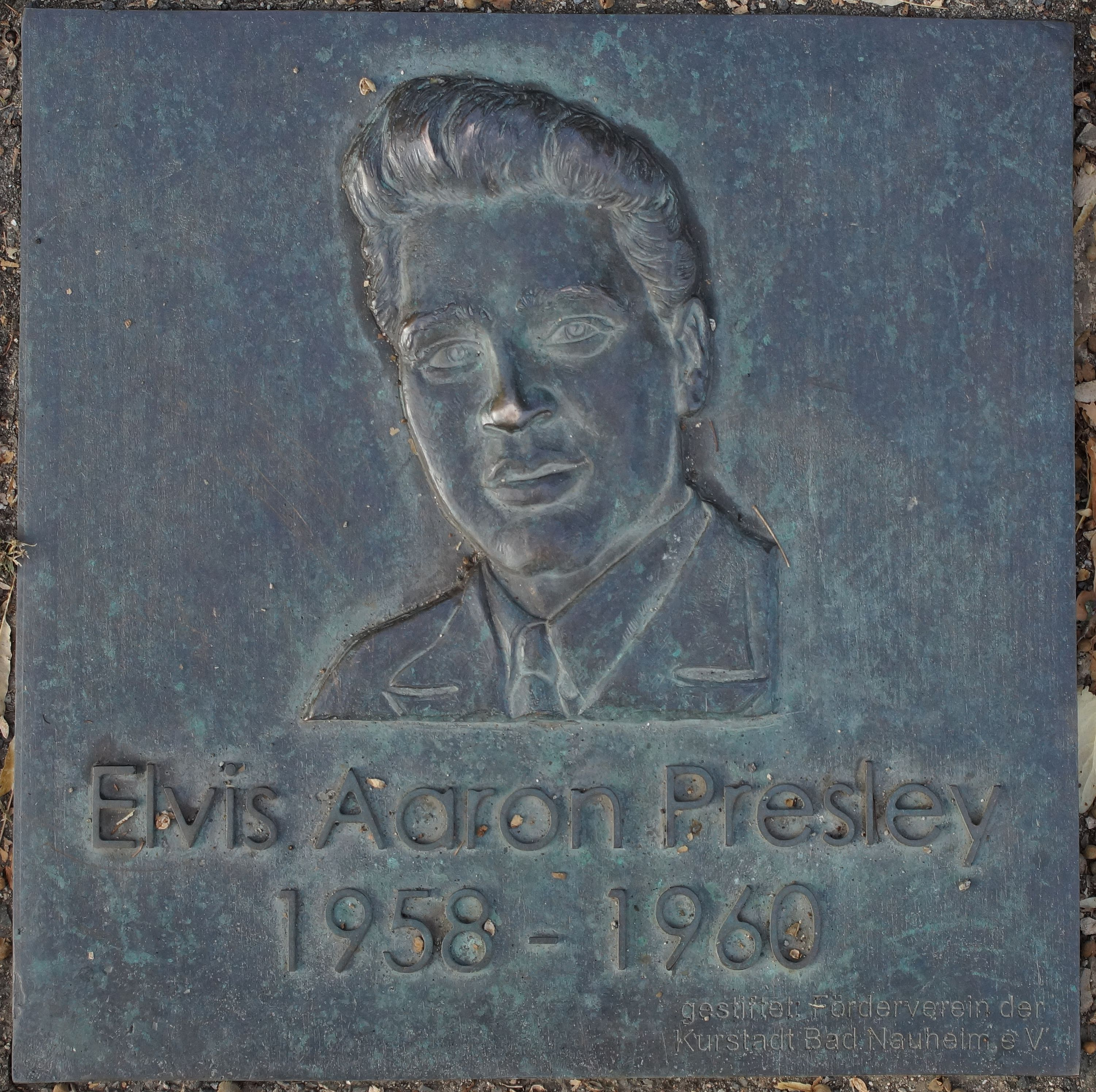
Presley's at the Walk of Fame in Bad Nauheim, Germany

Halls of Fame honoring Elvis Presley
Organization	Year	Notes	Result	Ref.
Playboy Jazz and Pop Hall of Fame	1971	Hall of fame inductee	Won	
Rock Music Awards Hall of Fame	1977	Hall of fame inductee	Won	
Playboy Musical Hall of Fame	1978	Hall of fame inductee	Won	
Jukebox Legends Hall of Fame	—N/a	By the Amusement & Music Operators Association (AMOA)	Won	
Rock and Roll Hall of Fame	1986	Hall of fame inductee	Won	
Country Music Hall of Fame	1998	Hall of fame inductee	Won	
Mississippi Musicians Hall of Fame	2000	Hall of fame inductee	Won	
Gospel Music Hall of Fame	2001	Hall of fame inductee	Won	
UK Music Hall of Fame	2004	Inaugural induction	Won	
Karate Hall of Fame (New York)	2005	Hall of fame inductee	Won	
The Peabody's Duck Walk Hall of Fame	2007	Hall of fame inductee	Won	
Rockabilly Hall of Fame	2007	Hall of fame inductee	Won	
Christian Music Hall of Fame	2007	Hall of fame inductee	Won	
Motion Picture Hall of Fame	2008	Hall of fame inductee	Won	
Memphis Music Hall of Fame	2012	Inaugural induction	Won	
Hit Parade Hall of Fame	2014	Hall of fame inductee	Won	
National Rhythm & Blues Hall of Fame	2015	Hall of fame inductee	Won	
Martial Arts Hall of Fame	2016	Hall of fame inductee	Won	
Kenpo Karate Hall of Fame	2016	Hall of fame inductee	Won	
Mississippi Hall of Fame	2016	Second musician inducted	Won	
Mississippi Arts and Entertainment Experience Hall of Fame	2017	Hall of fame inductee	Won	
Volunteer State Music Hall of Fame	2025	Hall of fame inductee	Won	

Halls of Fame honoring Elvis Presley's work
Organization	Year	Inductee work	Status	Ref.
Grammy Hall of Fame	1988	"Hound Dog"	Won	
Grammy Hall of Fame	1995	"Heartbreak Hotel"	Won	
Grammy Hall of Fame	1998	"That's All Right"	Won	
Grammy Hall of Fame	1999	"Suspicious Minds"	Won	
Grammy Hall of Fame	2002	"Don't Be Cruel"	Won	
Grammy Hall of Fame	2007	"Are You Lonesome Tonight?"	Won	
Grammy Hall of Fame	2017	"Jailhouse Rock"	Won	

List of Walks of Fame
Organization	Year	Notes	Result	Ref.
Hollywood Walk of Fame	1960	Walk of Fame Star	Won	
Palm Springs Walk of Stars	1994	Walk of Fame Star	Won	
Star Trail of Fame	1997	Walk of Fame Star	Won	
Northwest Louisiana Walk of Stars (Shreveport)	(Note: Between 1997-2004)	Walk of Fame Star	Won	
Music City Walk of Fame (Nashville)	2008	Walk of Fame Star	Won	
Las Vegas Walk of Stars	2008	Walk of Fame Star	Won	
Mississippi Arts and Entertainment Experience	2016	Walk of Fame Star	Won	
Kraków's Walk of Stars	2018	Walk of Fame Star	Won	
Beale Street Brass Notes Walk of Fame	—N/a	Walk of Fame Notes	Won	
Bad Nauheim Walk of Fame	—N/a	Walk of Fame Plaque	Won	
Hollywood Rock Walk	—N/a	Walk of Fame Plaque	Won	

== Decorations, state honors and other accolades ==
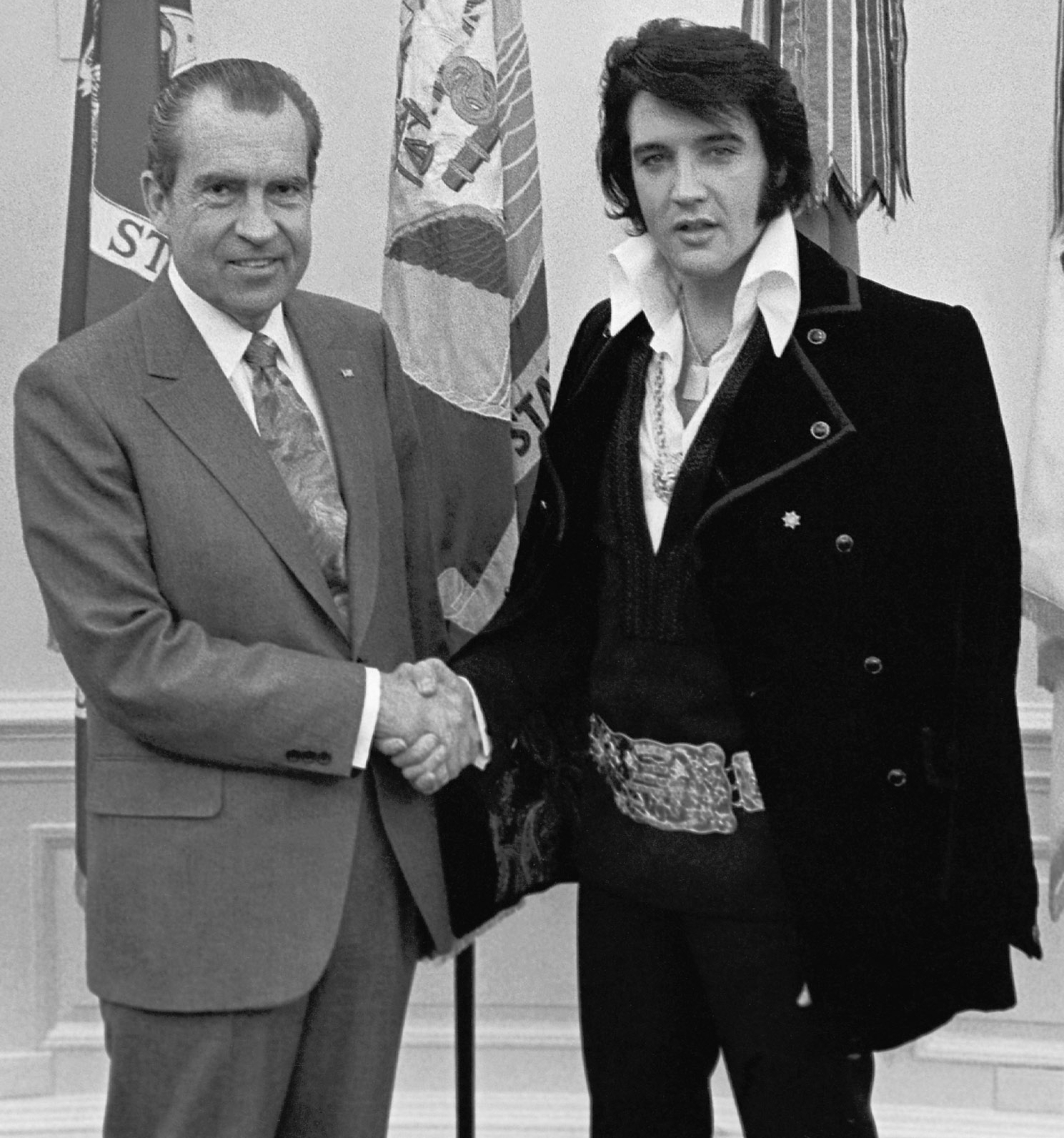
Elvis Presley and then U.S. president Richard Nixon in 1970.

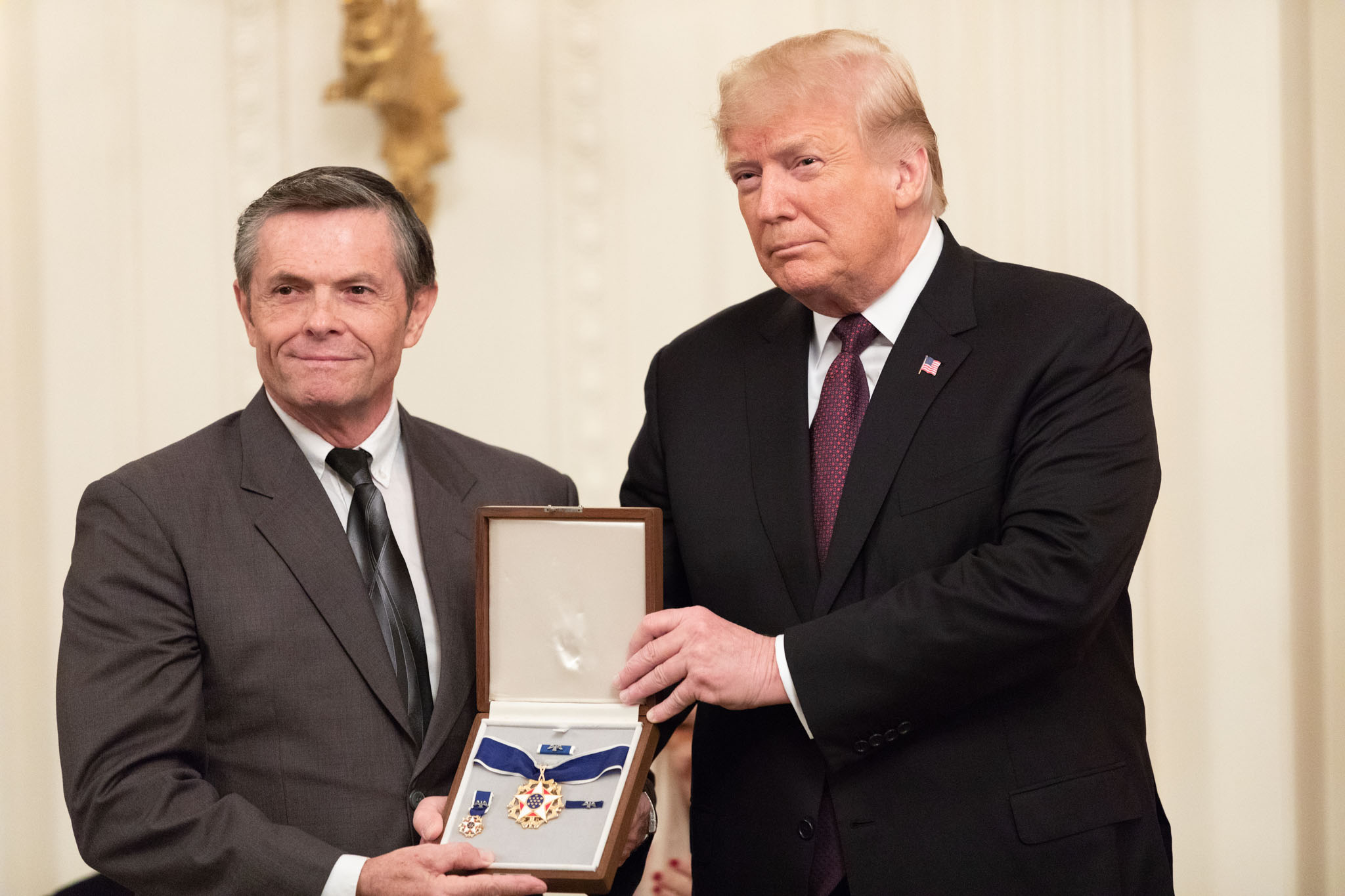
President Donald Trump presents Presidential Medal of Freedom for Elvis Presley to Jack Soden

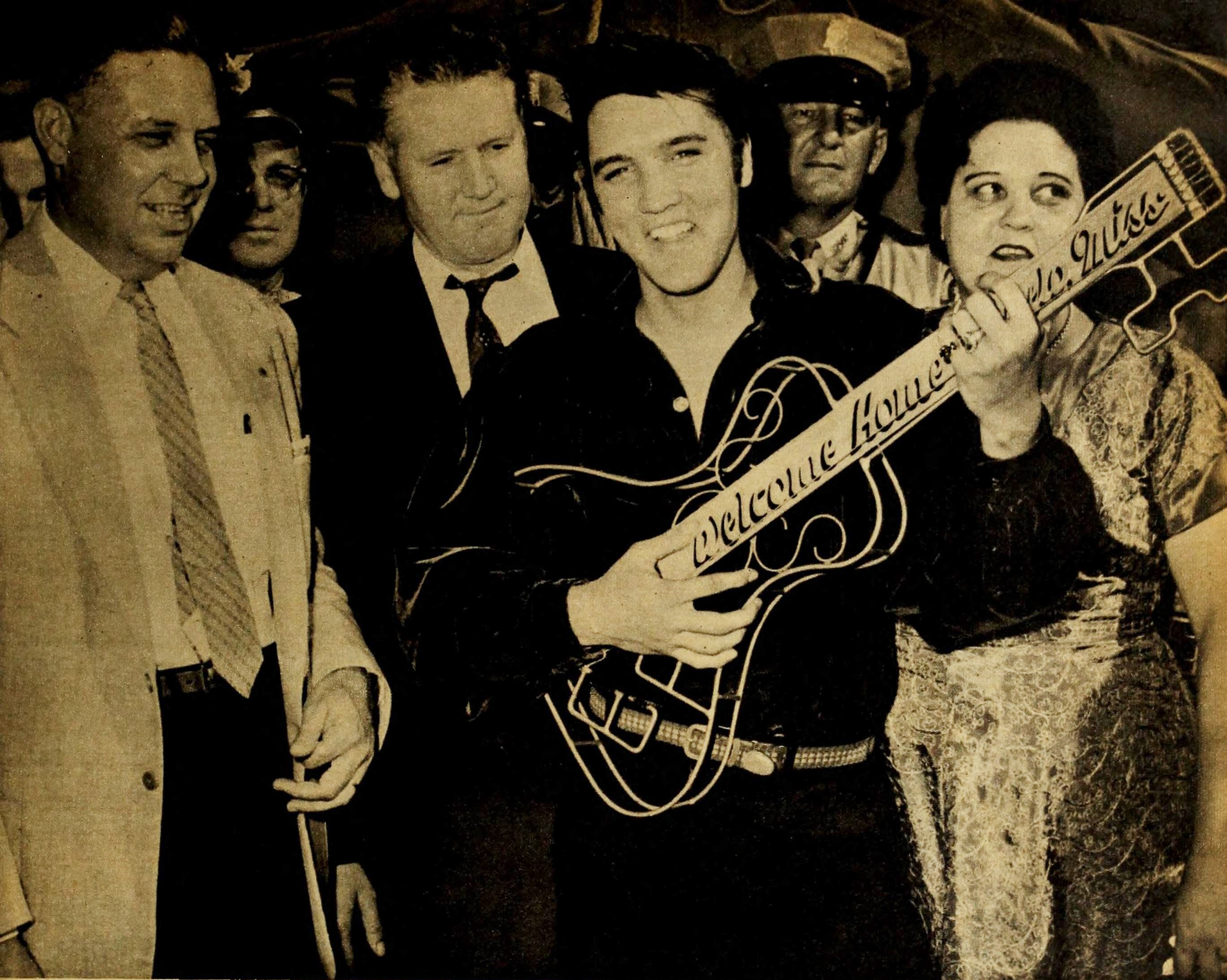
Elvis Presley with the Key to the City of Tupelo, a guitar-shaped key provided by Mayor James L. Ballard

State honors granted to Elvis Presley
Government/organizer	Year	Award	Result	Ref.
City of Tupelo	1957	Key to the City of Tupelo, Mississippi	Won	
Government of Mississippi	1957	Scroll of honor, awarded by Gov. James P. Coleman and certified him as "America's No. 1 entertainer in the field of popular music"	Won	
Tennessee State Legislature	1961	Honorary Tennessee Colonel "Aide-de-Camp" by Governor Buford Ellington	Won	
City of Yankeetown	1961	Key to the City of Yankeetown, Florida	Won	
City of Memphis	1967	A massive plaque from the City of Memphis, to commemorate his charitable contributions to more than 50 local charities	Won	
BNDD	1970	An honorary badge at U.S. president Richard Nixon's request	Won	
City of Macon	1975	Key to the City of Macon, Georgia	Won	
City of Macon	1975	Honorary citizenship	Won	
Budapest's City Council	2011	Honorary citizenship of Budapest, Hungary	Won	
President of the United States	2018	Presidential Medal of Freedom	Won	

Civil and other awards granted to Elvis Presley
Organization	Year	Award	Result	Ref.
Tau Kappa Epsilon at Arkansas State College	1960	Honorary Teke of the Year "(Man of the Year)"	Won	
Los Angeles Tribal Council	1960	Inducted and granted a special recognition by chief Wah-Neo-Ota	Won	
Pacific War Memorial Commission	1961	Special award for his charitable efforts to help raise money and bring attention to help build the USS Arizona Memorial	Won	
Sigma Chi fraternity	1966	Young Leadership Award	Won	
Westgate Las Vegas (a.k.a. International Hotel)	1969	A Gold Belt for his "World's Championship Attendance Record"	Won	
Ten Outstanding Young Americans	1970	Outstanding YoungMen of the Nation Award	Won	
City of Tupelo	1971	"Good neighbor" plaque	Won	
Kui Lee Cancer Fund	1973	Special plaque provided for his charitable gig Aloha from Hawaii via Satellite	Won	
Liberty Bowl Festive Association	1977	Distinguished American Award	Won	
Veterans of Foreign Wars (Mississippi)	1977	Highest honor award for patriotic and humanitarian service	Won	
Karate Hall of Fame (New York)	2005	In Memory Award	Won	

== Dedications ==
=== Preservation and dedications ===
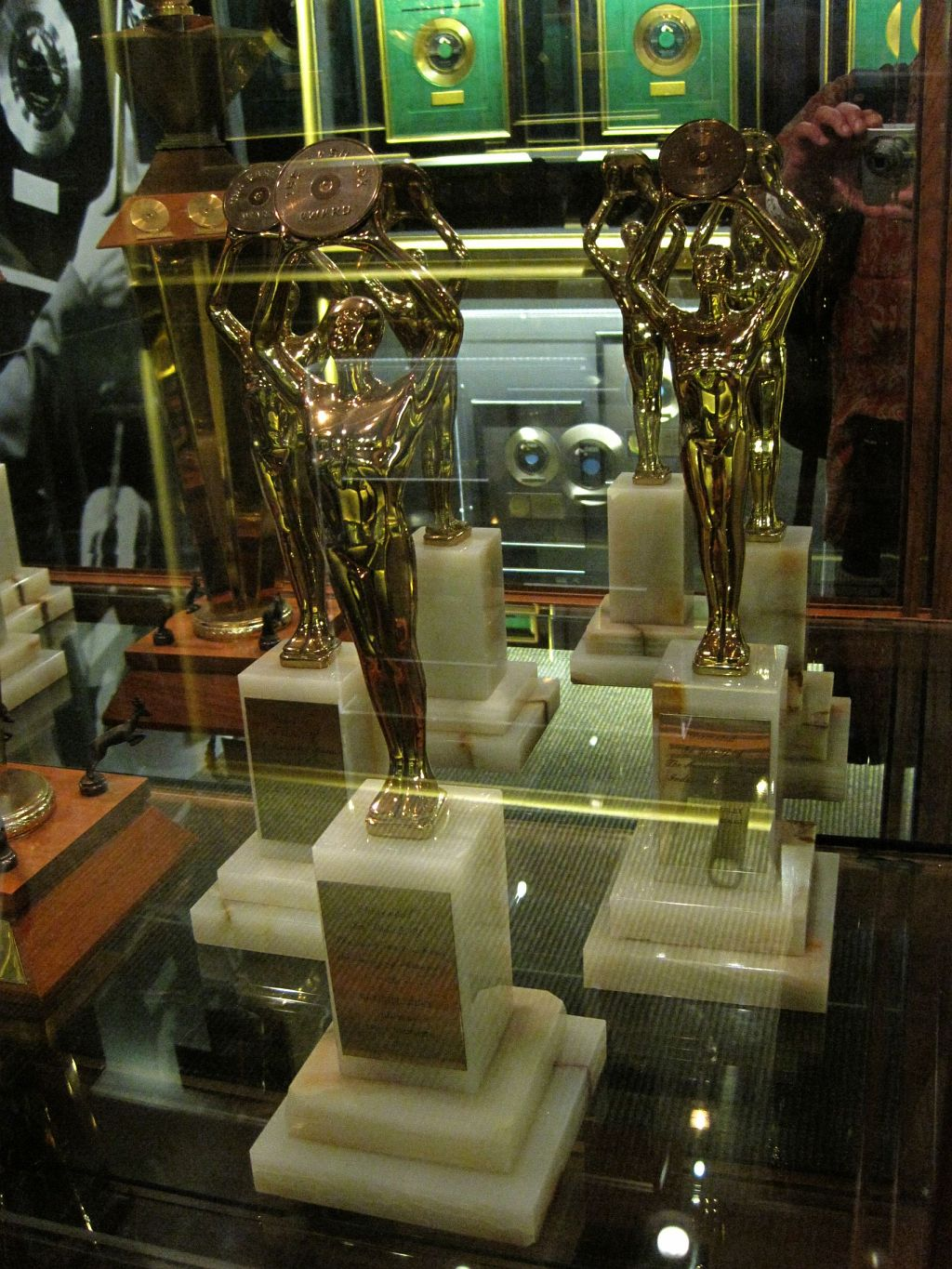
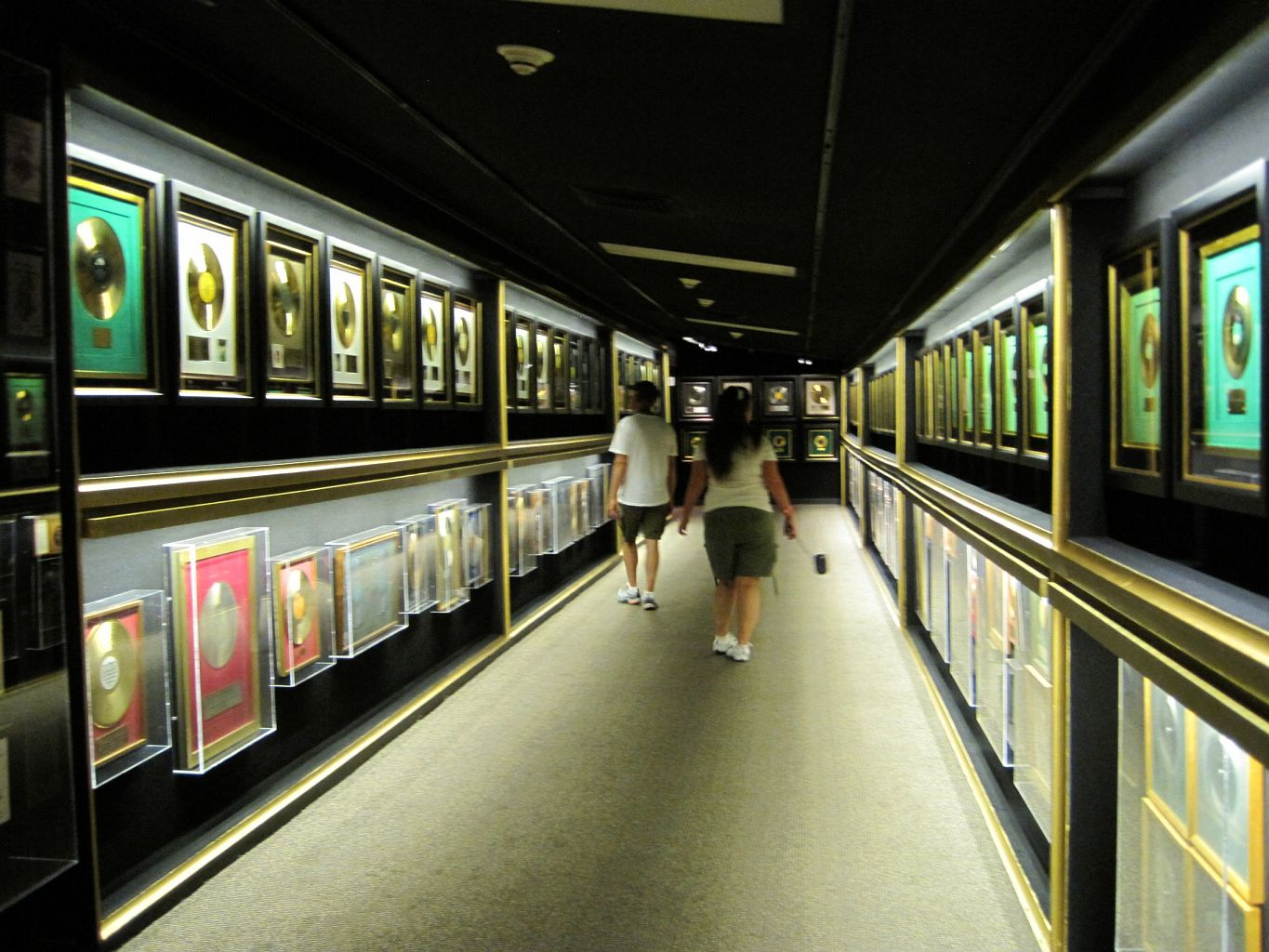
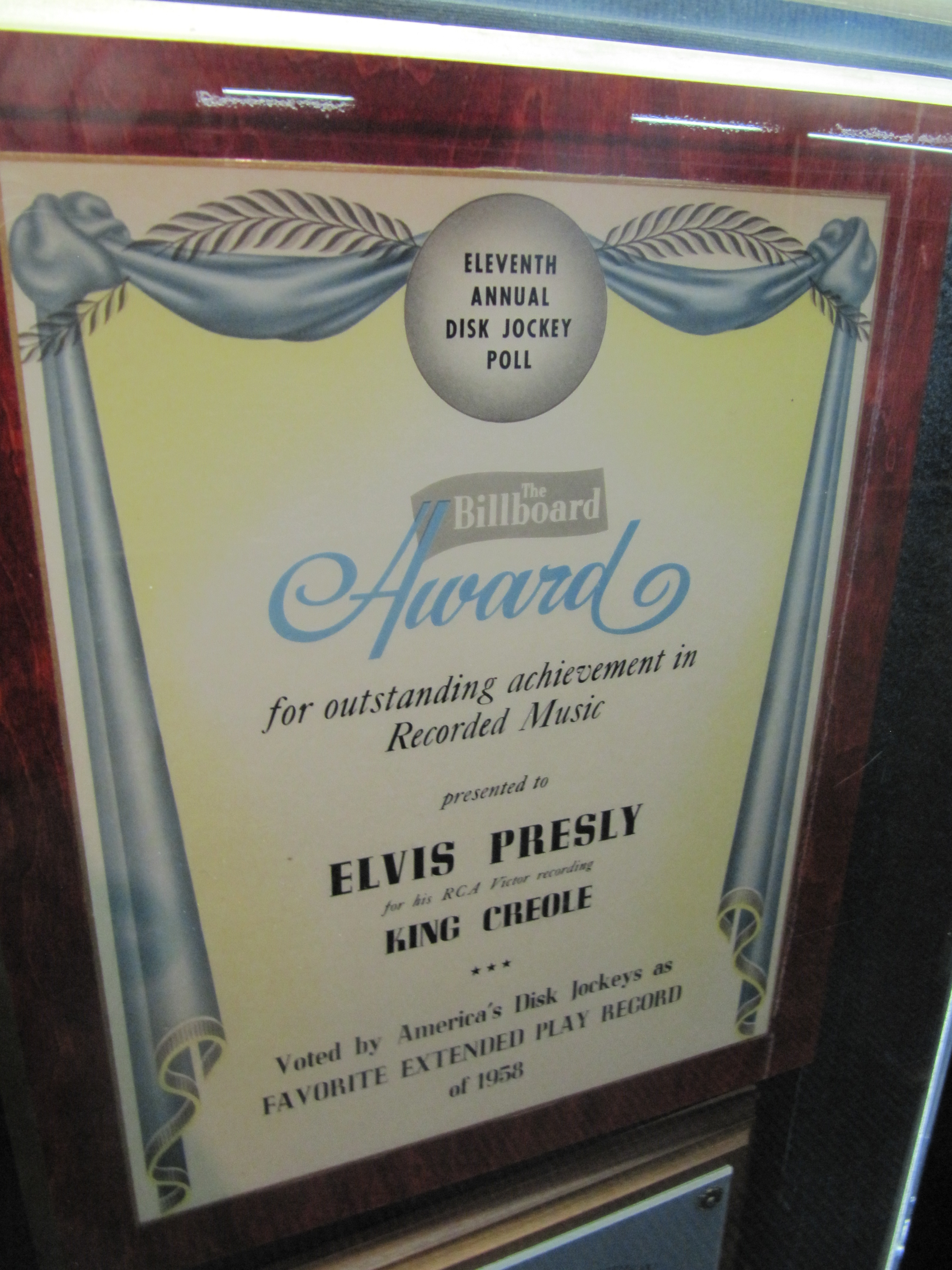
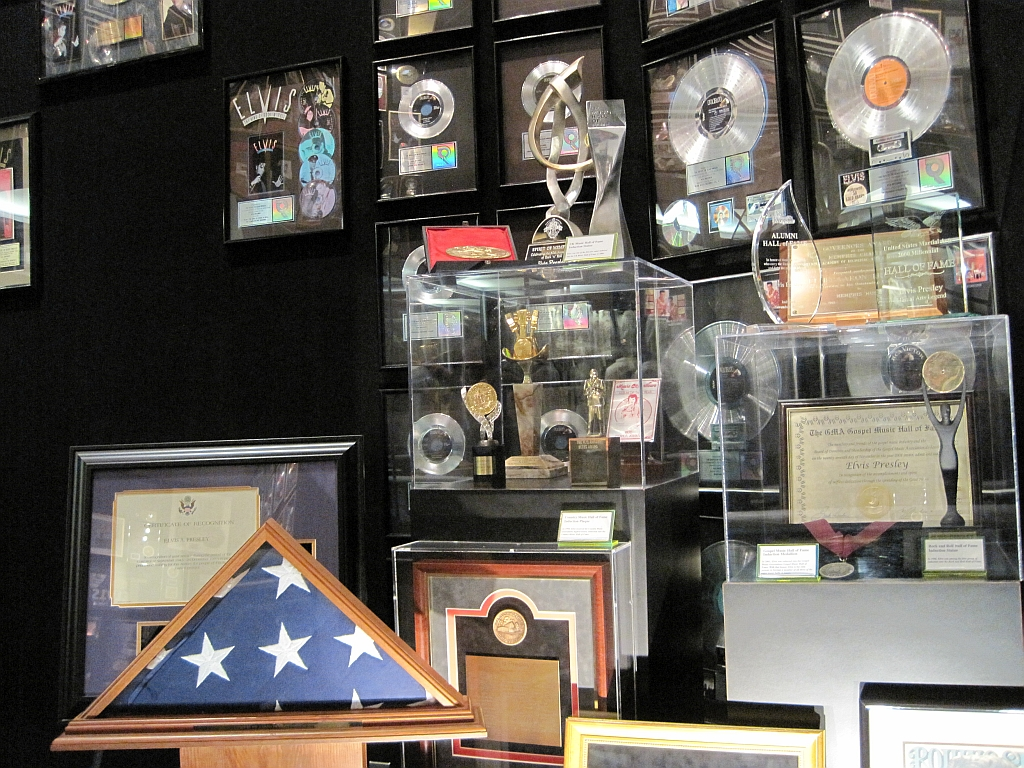
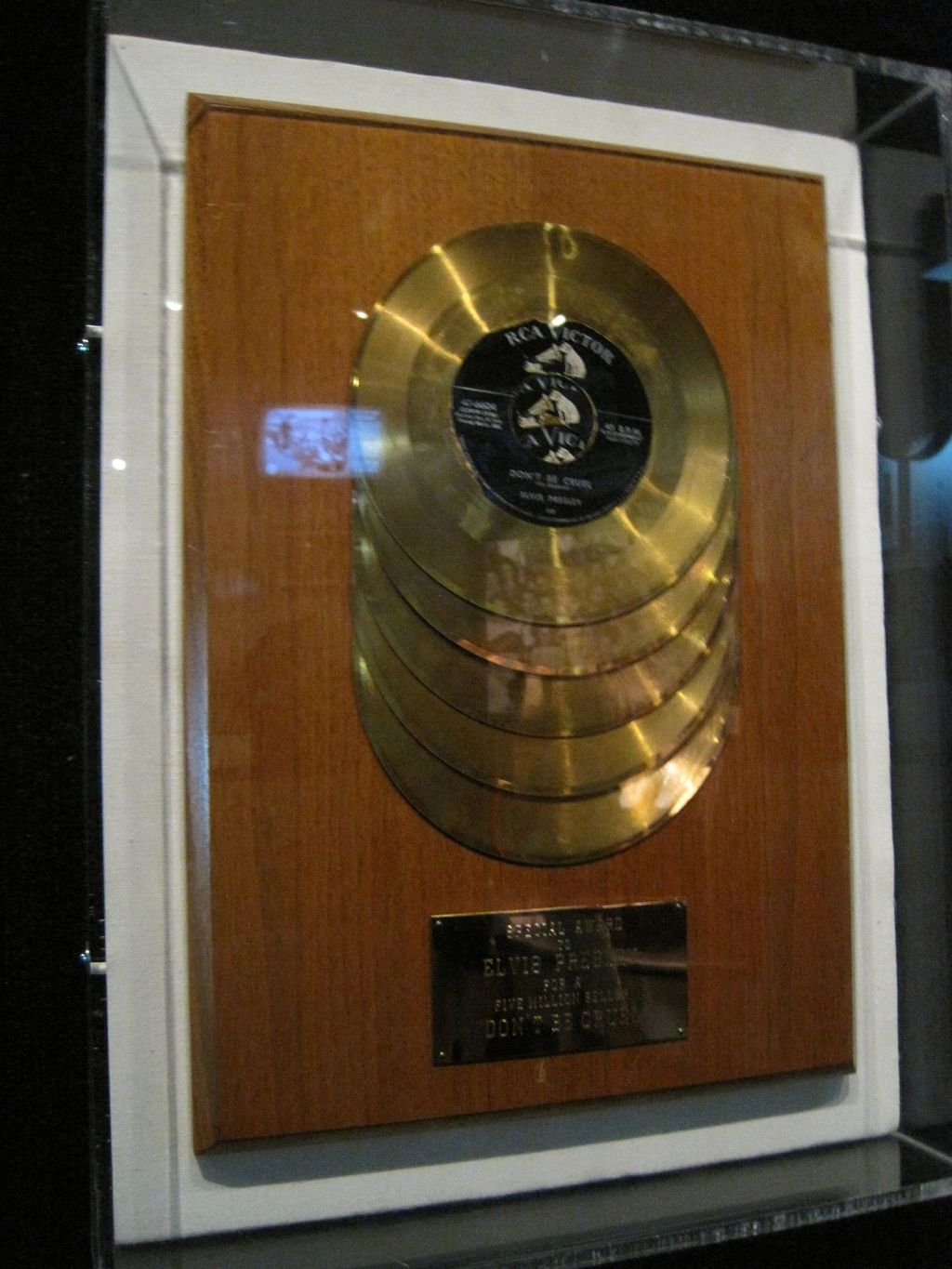
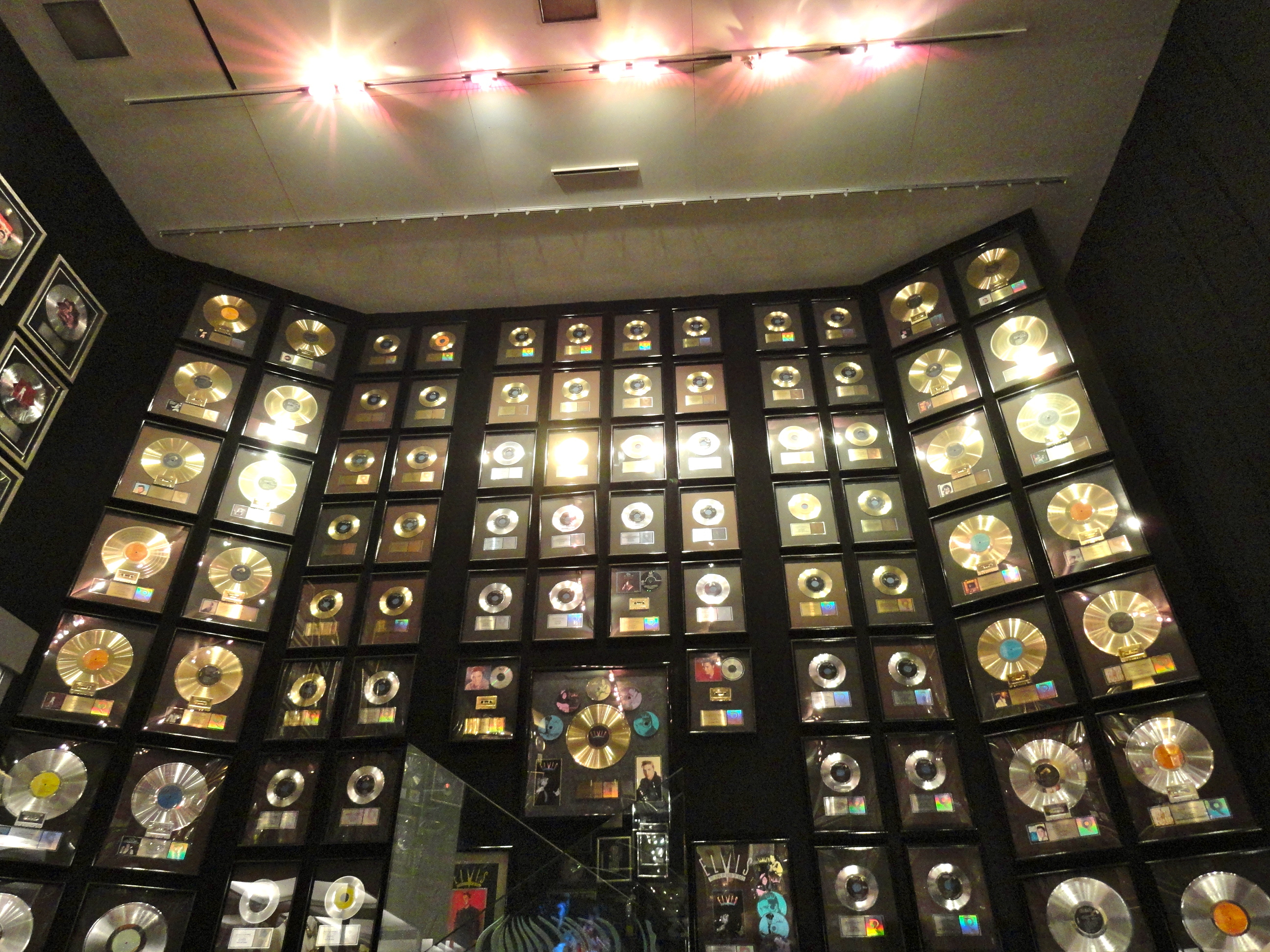
Some of the accolades received by Elvis Presley, including music certifications at the Graceland's Trophy Room/Hall of Gold

Graceland's "Trophy Room"/"Hall of Gold" exhibit some of the accolades received by Elvis Presley, including music recording certifications. The trophy building is a "famous" 80-foot "Hall of Gold" according to Reading Eagle. Graceland itself was listed by the National Historic Landmark in 2006—country's highest designation for historic properties— and by the National Register of Historic Places in 1991. According to National Council on Economic Education's United States History (1993), Elvis gained global popularity and received certifications all over the world, including Yugoslavia, Japan and South Africa. Notably, he received the first Gold Record Award for a single by the Recording Industry Association of America (RIAA) in 1958.

List of Elvis Presley's works preserved
Organization	Year	Inductee work	Status	Ref.
National Register of Historic Places	1991	Graceland	Honoree	
National Recording Registry	2002	Sun Records sessions (1954–1955)	Honoree	
National Film Registry	2005	Jailhouse Rock	Honoree	
National Historic Landmark	2006	Graceland	Honoree	

=== Depictions ===
A number of prizes were named after Elvis or inspired by him, including:

International Rock Awards; a category named after Elvis with its Elvis statuette

Memphis Music Awards; established in his honor

Hardin–Simmons University; The Elvis Presley Award

NARM Scholarship Award; Elvis Presley Memorial Award

Memphis State University; the "Distinguished Achievement Award", started as an Elvis tribute, the Elvis memory award honored outstanding contributions in creative and performing arts

Tennessee Walking Horse National Celebration; a trophy giving in memory of Elvis Presley

International Elvis Tribute Artist Hall of Fame

Elvis Presley Impersonators Hall of Fame

Presley Charitable Foundation

== See also ==
- List of accolades received by Elvis (2022 film)
- Top Ten Money Making Stars Poll

== Further references ==
- Honorary captain in the Denver police force (Colorado Public Radio; 2017)
- Elvis Memorial plaque, from "Always Elvis" convention in Las Vegas (Billboard, 1978)
- The Campus Corner "King", various times. See 1956 (Ottawa Citizen) or 1959 (Ottawa Citizen)
- Gilbert Youth Research Organization Poll (Billboard, 1968)
- National Association of Record Merchandisers (NARM) survey (Billboard, 1963)
- 1965 BMI Awards (Music Business, 1965)
- Hong Kong Polls (Record Mirror, 1961)
