= Burning Love (disambiguation) =

"Burning Love" is a 1972 song by Elvis Presley. It may also refer to:

- Burning love, a common name for the plant Lychnis chalcedonica.

== Film and TV ==
- Burning Love (Arrested Development), a season 2 episode of the sitcom Arrested Development
- Burning Love (film), a 2015 mockumentary comedy film
- Burning Love (TV series), an American scripted comedy series

== Music ==
- Burning Love (band), a hardcore punk band from Toronto, Ontario, Canada
- Burning Love and Hits from His Movies, Volume 2, a 1972 compilation album by Elvis Presley
- "Burning Love", a song by Kix from the album Cool Kids, 1983
- "Burnin Love", a song by Dido from the album Safe Trip Home, 2008
