= Separate Ways =

Separate Ways may refer to:

- Separate Ways (Elvis Presley album), 1973 compilation by Elvis Presley
  - "Separate Ways" (Elvis Presley song), title track of the above album
- Separate Ways, a 1981 film starring Karen Black
- "Separate Ways (Worlds Apart)", 1983 single by Journey
- "Separate Ways", 1992 single of the After Hours album by Gary Moore
- "Separate Ways" (Faye Wong song), title track of 2001 EP by Faye Wong
- "Separate Ways (Worlds Apart)" (Dawson's Creek), a 2002 television episode
- Separate Ways (Teddy Thompson album), 2005 album by Teddy Thompson, or its title track
- Separate Ways, novel by Ichiyō Higuchi
- Separate Ways, a bonus campaign from the 2005 video game Resident Evil 4 and its 2023 remake.
