= List of monuments and memorials to Elvis Presley =

There are many memorials dedicated to American singer and actor Elvis Presley.

== Statues ==
=== United States ===
Image	Location (and name)	Date	Sculptor	Ref
	Tupelo, Mississippi; Elvis Presley Birthplace "Elvis at 13"^{34.25927138943434°N 88.67779233110497°W}		Michiel VanderSommen	
	Tupelo, Mississippi; Elvis Presley Birthplace; Becoming^{34.25927138943434°N 88.67779233110497°W}	2015	Michiel VanderSommen	
	Tupelo, Mississippi; City Hall grounds^{34.257123895646345°N 88.7012001464303°W}	2012	Bill Beckwith	
	Memphis; B.B. King Elvis Presley Welcome Center^{35.06117636919467°N 90.02412747865334°W}	1996	Ed Dwight	
	Memphis; Beale Street^{35.13998327413054°N 90.05427749194408°W}	1997	Andrea Lugar	
	Shreveport, Louisiana; Shreveport Municipal Memorial Auditorium^{32.507719612582115°N 93.75318923272535°W}			
	Daytona, Florida; Bruce Rossmeier's Harley Davidson^{29.339401273290616°N 81.13220988500129°W}		Jeff Decker	
	Dallas^{32.78335057136305°N 96.80745199277456°W}			
	Las Vegas; Westgate Las Vegas^{36.13555524034683°N 115.15250868360032°W},			
	Bakersfield, California; Buck Owens Crystal Palace^{35.38559171990276°N 115.15250868360032°W},			
	Honolulu; Neal S. Blaisdell Center	2007		
	Seattle			

=== Outside United States ===
Image	Location (and name)	Date	Sculptor	Ref
	Parkes, New South Wales; Cooke Park^{33.13984798674574°S 148.17448853742778°E}			
	Randers, Denmark; Memphis Mansion^{56.4333947333818°N 10.05415854474275°E}	2012		
	Kobuleti, country of Georgia; Musicians Park^{33.13984798674574°S 148.17448853742778°E}			
	Bad Nauheim, Hesse, Germany	2021		
	Neve Ilan, Abu Ghosh, Israel; Elvis Inn^{31.80449047243748°N 35.09227582692281°E}			
	Neve Ilan, Abu Ghosh, Israel; Elvis Inn^{31.804524664616423°N 35.09246492264042°E}			
	Neve Ilan, Abu Ghosh, Israel; Elvis Inn			
	Kobe; Harborland	1987 (rededicated 2009)		
	Glasgow; Kelvingrove Art Gallery and Museum; Return to Sender	1996	Sean Read	

== Memorials and other works ==
=== United States ===
Image	Location (and name)	Date	Sculptor	Ref
	Memphis; Graceland; Grave of Elvis Presley^{35.045252702419276°N 90.02281919767715°W}			
	Hollywood, California; Hollywood Walk of Fame			
	Dodgeville, Wisconsin; Elvis Karate Fight Plaque			

=== Outside United States ===
Image	Location (and name)	Date	Sculptor	Ref
	Willofs, Schlitz, Hesse, Germany^{50.68041357822582°N 9.47414679244014°E}			
	Ray Barracks in Friedberg, Hesse, Germany^{50.321993976819456°N 8.74734039019571°E}			
	Bad Nauheim, Germany; Hotel Grunewald^{50.36700480819453°N 8.736834083787997°E}			
	Ober-Mörlen, Hesse, Germany; Eichkopf Proving Ground^{50.34749769744427°N 8.656109471387843°E}			
	Dębniki Zhchód, Kraków^{50.04492633935178°N 19.910947757581688°E}			
	Parkes, New South Wales; Kelly Reserve^{33.125573957667235°S 148.1741593468196°E}			
	Melbourne; Melbourne General Cemetery^{37.78931692164808°S 144.9638755670165°E}	1977		

== See also ==
- List of accolades received by Elvis Presley
