= It's a Matter of Time =

Single by Elvis Presley

from the album Burning Love and Hits from His Movies, Volume 2
- A-side: "Burning Love"
- Released: August 1972
- Recorded: March 29, 1972
- Studio: RCA Studio C, Hollywood; RCA Studio B, Nashville
- Genre: Country
- Length: 2:48
- Label: RCA Victor
- Songwriter: Clive Westlake

Elvis Presley singles chronology
| "An American Trilogy" / "The First Time Ever I Saw Your Face" (1972) | "Burning Love" / "It's a Matter of Time" (1972) | "Separate Ways" / "Always on My Mind" (1972) |

"It's a Matter of Time'" is a song written by Clive Westlake and recorded in 1972 by Elvis Presley.

It was recorded by Presley on the final day of the March 27–29, 1972, recording session at RCA Studio C in Hollywood. Overdubs were later recorded in Nashville at RCA Studio B.

The song was first released in August 1972 as a B-side to "Burning Love" and then in November on the album Burning Love and Hits from His Movies, Volume 2.

== Critical response ==
Billboard in its August 12, 1972, issue put the single "Burning Love / It's a Matter of Time" on the recommended list (New Radio Action Billboard Pick Singles, section "Pop").

== Reception ==
While the A-side ("Burning Love") made it to number two on the Hot 100, the flip side ("It's a Matter of Time") charted both on the Billboard Easy Listening and Hot Country Singles charts.

"Burning Love / It's a Matter of Time" became the last Elvis Presley's single to be certified platinum.

== Charts ==
| Chart (1972) | Peak position |
|---|---|
| US Billboard Easy Listening | 27* / 9** |
| US Billboard Hot Country Singles | 36* |

^{*} as "It's a Matter of Time"
^{**} as "It's a Matter of Time / Burning Love"
