= Always on My Mind =

Ballad written by Wayne Carson, Mark James, and Johnny Christopher

"You Were Always on My Mind"
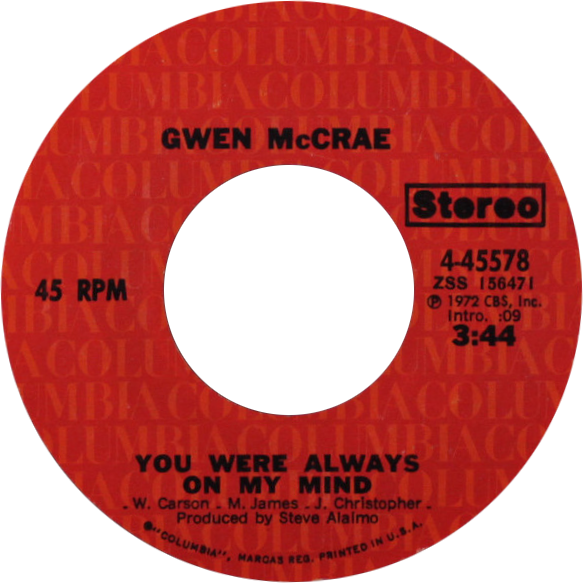
- US release of the Gwen McCrae recording

Single by Gwen McCrae
- A-side: "He's Not You"
- Released: March 28, 1972
- Length: 3:44
- Label: Columbia
- Songwriters: Wayne Carson; Mark James; Johnny Christopher
- Producer: Steve Alaimo

"Always on My Mind"
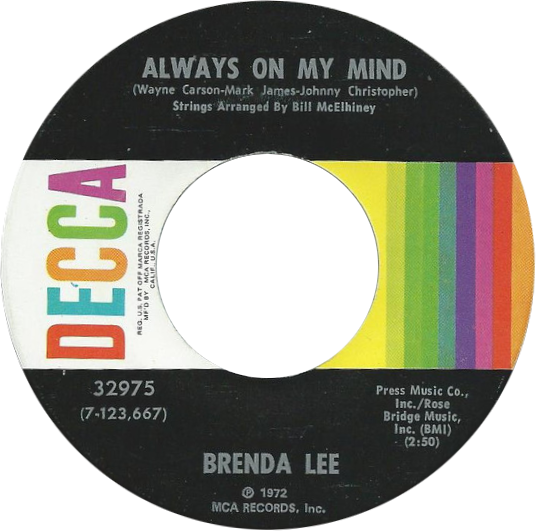
- US single of the Brenda Lee recording

Single by Brenda Lee

from the album Brenda
- B-side: "That Ain't Right"
- Released: June 1972
- Studio: American Sound (Memphis, Tennessee)
- Genre: Country
- Length: 2:50
- Label: Decca
- Songwriters: Wayne Carson; Mark James; Johnny Christopher
- Producer: Owen Bradley

Brenda Lee singles chronology
"Misty Memories" (1971)	"Always on My Mind" (1972)	"Nobody Wins" (1973)

"Always on My Mind" is a ballad written by Wayne Carson, Johnny Christopher, and Mark James, first recorded by Brenda Lee and first released by Gwen McCrae (as "You Were Always on My Mind") in March 1972. Lee's version was released three months later in June 1972. The song has been a crossover hit, charting in both the country and western and pop categories. Elvis Presley's recording was the first commercially successful version of the song.

AllMusic lists more than 300 recorded releases of the song in versions by dozens of performers. While Lee's version reached No. 45 on the US country chart in 1972, other performers reached the top 20 on the country and/or pop charts in the United States and elsewhere with their own versions: Elvis Presley (1972, US country; UK pop top ten); John Wesley Ryles (1979, US country) and Willie Nelson's version (1982, US/Canada country number one; US/Canada pop top ten); and the Pet Shop Boys' 1987 hi-NRG/synth-pop interpretation (UK number one; US top ten).

== Background and composition ==
"Always on My Mind" was not completed until late 1971. Songwriter-guitarist Wayne Carson had about two verses done with the working title "You Were Always on My Mind". He had been occupied in Memphis on a project that required him to stay ten days longer, and he phoned his wife in Springfield, Missouri, to apologize for the delay. She was angry, and he replied: "Well, I know I’ve been gone a lot, but I’ve been thinking about you all the time." This idea struck him as potential song material, and he quickly ended the call so he could capture it on paper. He brought the song back to the recording studio of Chips Moman and worked on it for a few days, but it did not gel. Carson asked for help from his colleague Johnny Christopher (the two had already written the hit song "No Love at All" in 1970) and they composed more of it in Moman's office. Feeling stuck, they appealed for assistance from songwriter Mark James who was walking through the studio. James was exhausted from non-stop music projects, but he ran through the song with Carson and Christopher. By the fourth run-through, the song was finished.

Music critic Robert Hilburn said that it was commonly thought in Nashville and Memphis that Elvis Presley's marital troubles were the inspiration of the song, and that it was tailored to fit his musical style. Fueling this conjecture was that James had already written a hit song "Suspicious Minds" for Presley. Carson responded that the song was not written for Presley but for every man. He said that it "was one long apology. It’s sort of like all guys who screw up and would love nothing better than to pick up the phone and call their wives and say, 'Listen, honey, I could have done better, but I want you to know that you were always on my mind.'"

== Elvis Presley version ==
"Always on My Mind"
- Picture sleeve (reverse) for North American single with "Separate Ways" in smaller font, also used for some European and Australian releases

Single by Elvis Presley

from the album Separate Ways
- A-side: "Separate Ways"
- Released: October 31, 1972
- Recorded: March 29, 1972
- Studio: RCA (Hollywood, California)
- Genre: Country; soft rock
- Length: 3:37
- Label: RCA Victor
- Songwriters: Wayne Carson; Mark James; Johnny Christopher
- Producer: Felton Jarvis

Elvis Presley singles chronology
"Burning Love" (1972)	"Always on My Mind" (1972)	"Fool" / "Steamroller Blues" (1973)

Elvis Presley recorded "Always on My Mind" on March 29, 1972, a few weeks after his February separation from his wife, Priscilla. The song was popular and critically appreciated and is considered one of Presley's standout songs of the 1970s. The song was released as the B-side of the "Separate Ways" single, which was certified gold by the Recording Industry Association of America (RIAA) for sales in excess of one million units. It was listed as a double A-side, reaching number 16 on Billboard's Hot Country Singles chart in November 1972. In the United Kingdom, "Always on My Mind" (as the A-side) reached the Top Ten in January 1973. In 2013 the recording ranked number one in a poll conducted by ITV, "The Nation's Favourite Elvis Songs", just ahead of "Suspicious Minds" and "Can't Help Falling in Love".

=== Charts ===
1972–1973 chart performance for "Always on My Mind"
Chart (1972–1973)	Peak position
Belgium (Ultratop 50 Wallonia)	10
Canada Country Singles (RPM)	4
Ireland (IRMA)	9
UK Singles (Official Charts)	9
US Hot Country Songs (Billboard)	16
US Country Singles (Cash Box)	30

1997 chart performance for "Always on My Mind"
Chart (1997)	Peak position
Belgium (Ultratop 50 Flanders)	49
Netherlands (Dutch Top 40)	15
Netherlands (Single Top 100)	17

1999 chart performance for "Always on My Mind"
Chart (1999)	Peak position
France (SNEP)	56

2007 chart performance for "Always on My Mind"
Chart (2007)	Peak position
Switzerland (Schweizer Hitparade)	39

=== Certifications ===
Certifications for "Always on My Mind"
Region	Certification	Certified units/sales
New Zealand (RMNZ)	Gold	15,000^{‡}
United Kingdom (BPI)	Platinum	600,000^{‡}
^{‡} Sales+streaming figures based on certification alone.

== John Wesley Ryles version ==
"You Are Always on My Mind"

Single by John Wesley Ryles

from the album Let the Night Begin
- B-side: "My Angel Got Her Wings Today"
- Released: 1979
- Genre: Country
- Length: 3:40
- Label: MCA
- Songwriters: Wayne Carson; Mark James; Johnny Christopher
- Producer: Bob Montgomery

John Wesley Ryles singles chronology
"Liberated Woman" (1979)	"You Are Always on My Mind" (1979)	"Perfect Strangers" (1980)

In 1979, John Wesley Ryles reached number 20 on the US Hot Country Songs chart with his rendition, retitled "You Are Always on My Mind", from the album Let the Night Begin. The rendition was produced by Bob Montgomery.

A review in Billboard praised the "brightly mixed vocals" and "powerful production".

=== Charts ===
Chart performance for "Always on My Mind"
Chart (1979)	Peak position
Canada Country Singles (RPM)	24
US Hot Country Songs (Billboard)	20
US Country Singles (Cash Box)	17

== Willie Nelson version ==
"Always on My Mind"
- Side A of the US 7-inch vinyl

Single by Willie Nelson

from the album Always on My Mind
- B-side: "The Party's Over"
- Released: February 1982
- Genre: Country pop
- Length: 3:33
- Label: Columbia
- Songwriters: Johnny Christopher; Wayne Carson Thompson; Mark James
- Producer: Chips Moman

Willie Nelson singles chronology
"Heartaches of a Fool" (1981)	"Always on My Mind" (1982)	"Let It Be Me" (1982)

Willie Nelson recorded and released the song in early 1982. It raced to number one on Billboard's Hot Country Singles chart that May, spending two weeks on top and a total of 21 weeks on the chart. The song also fared well on Top 40 radio, reaching number five on the Billboard Hot 100 for three weeks and staying on that chart for 23 weeks. It was the best-performing single on the Hot Country Singles year-end chart of 1982. This version also charted in a number of other countries. The single was certified platinum by the RIAA on October 7, 1991.

Nelson's version resulted in three wins at the 25th Grammy Awards in February 1983: songwriters Christopher, James, and Carson won Song of the Year and Best Country Song; in addition, Nelson won for Best Male Country Vocal Performance. This version also won Country Music Association Awards in two consecutive years: 1982 Song of the Year and 1983 Song of the Year for songwriters Christopher, James and Carson; 1982 Single of the Year for Nelson; and contributed to Nelson winning 1982 Album of the Year for the album Always on My Mind.

Nelson performed the song with Johnny Cash on the 1998 release of VH1 Storytellers: Johnny Cash & Willie Nelson. The song was also featured in a December 2009 ASPCA commercial. In 2008, the song was inducted into the Grammy Hall of Fame.

In 2013, Nelson's version was also featured in its entirety in a season two episode of the HBO series The Newsroom.

=== Charts ===
==== Weekly charts ====
Chart (1982–1984)	Peak position
Australia (Kent Music Report)	39
Belgium (Ultratop 50 Flanders)	31
Canada Top Singles (RPM)	10
Canada Adult Contemporary (RPM)	4
Canada Country Singles (RPM)	1
Ireland (IRMA)	8
Netherlands (Dutch Top 40)	17
Netherlands (Single Top 100)	19
UK Singles (Official Charts)	49
US Billboard Hot 100	5
US Adult Contemporary (Billboard)	2
US Hot Country Songs (Billboard)	1
US Cash Box Top 100 Singles	4
US Country Singles (Cash Box)	1

==== Year-end charts ====
Chart (1982)	Position
Canada Top Singles (RPM)	70
US Billboard Hot 100	22
US Adult Contemporary (Billboard)	8
US Hot Country Singles (Billboard)	1
US Cash Box Top 100 Singles	31

=== Certifications ===
Certifications for "Always on My Mind"
Region	Certification	Certified units/sales
New Zealand (RMNZ)	Gold	15,000^{‡}
United Kingdom (BPI)	Silver	250,000^{‡}
United States (RIAA)	Platinum	1,000,000^{^}
^{^} Shipments figures based on certification alone.^{‡} Sales+streaming figures based on certification alone.

== Pet Shop Boys version ==
"Always on My Mind"
- Artwork for retail singles of most territories

Single by Pet Shop Boys
- B-side: "Do I Have To?"
- Released: November 30, 1987
- Genre: Synth-pop; dance-pop; hi-NRG; disco; post-disco
- Length: 3:56
- Label: Parlophone
- Songwriters: Wayne Carson; Johnny Christopher; Mark James
- Producers: Julian Mendelsohn; Pet Shop Boys

Pet Shop Boys singles chronology
"Rent" (1987)	"Always on My Mind" (1987)	"Heart" (1988)

"Always on My Mind / In My House"

Song by Pet Shop Boys

from the album Introspective
- Released: October 10, 1988
- Genre: Synth-pop; acid house
- Length: 9:05
- Label: Parlophone
- Songwriters: Wayne Carson; Johnny Christopher; Mark James; Chris Lowe; Neil Tennant
- Producers: Julian Mendelsohn; Pet Shop Boys

In 1987, the Pet Shop Boys performed a synth-pop version of "Always on My Mind" in Love Me Tender, a television special produced by Central Independent Television for ITV in the United Kingdom. Commemorating the tenth anniversary of Presley's death, the programme featured various popular acts of the time performing cover versions of his songs. The Pet Shop Boys' performance was so well-received that the duo decided to record the song and release it as a single. It was later included on the 1991 compilation album Discography.

This hi-NRG, dance-pop, disco, and post-disco version became the UK's Christmas number-one single that year – edging out "Fairytale of New York" by the Pogues and Kirsty MacColl – spending four weeks atop the chart. It also reached number four on the US Billboard Hot 100, becoming the duo's fifth and final top-10 hit on that chart.

As of May 2024, it is the second-most streamed Pet Shop Boys song in the UK with 53 million streams.

=== Composition ===
The Pet Shop Boys version introduces a harmonic variation not present in the original version. In the original, the ending phrase "always on my mind" is sung to a IV-V^{7}-I cadence (C-D^{7}-G). The Pet Shop Boys extend this cadence by adding two further chords: C-D^{7}-Gm^{7}/B♭-C-G (i.e., a progression of IV-V^{7}-III_{b}-IV-I).

=== Critical reception ===
In November 2004, The Daily Telegraph placed the version at number two in a list of the 50 best cover versions of all time. In October 2014, a public poll compiled by the BBC saw the song voted the all-time best cover version.

=== Music video ===
In the video for Pet Shop Boys' version of "Always on My Mind" (an excerpt from their surreal music film It Couldn't Happen Here) (1988), Neil Tennant and Chris Lowe are seated in the front of a taxi cab, when an eccentric passenger gets in, played by British actor Joss Ackland. At the end of the song, he gets out of the car and the car drives away. Standing alone, he mutters: "You went away. It should make me feel better. But I don't know how I'm going to get through", which is part of the lyric for another Pet Shop Boys song, "What Have I Done to Deserve This?", released earlier in the year.

=== Remixes ===
In 1988, the duo remixed the song for their third studio album, Introspective, combining it with the acid house track "In My House". Two further remixes by longtime Pet Shop Boys remixer Shep Pettibone were released on the US promotional triple vinyl version of the album—Shep's Holiday mix and Shep's House mix. Neither have appeared in any other format since.

=== Charts ===
==== Weekly charts ====
Chart (1987–1988)	Peak position
Australia (Australian Music Report)	10
Austria (Ö3 Austria Top 40)	2
Belgium (Ultratop 50 Flanders)	2
Canada Retail Singles (The Record)	1
Canada Top Singles (RPM)	1
Denmark (Tracklisten)	2
Europe (European Hot 100 Singles)	1
Finland (Suomen virallinen lista)	1
France (SNEP)	22
Iceland (Íslenski Listinn Topp 10)	2
Ireland (IRMA)	2
Italy (Musica e dischi)	8
Luxembourg (Radio Luxembourg)	1
Netherlands (Dutch Top 40)	3
Netherlands (Single Top 100)	5
New Zealand (Recorded Music NZ)	8
Norway (VG-lista)	3
Panama (UPI)	3
Peru (UPI)	3
Quebec (ADISQ)	4
South Africa (Springbok Radio)	3
Spain (AFYVE)	1
Sweden (Sverigetopplistan)	1
Switzerland (Schweizer Hitparade)	1
UK Singles (Official Charts)	1
UK Dance (Music Week)	1
US Billboard Hot 100	4
US Dance Club Songs (Billboard)	8
US Dance Singles Sales (Billboard)	12
US Cash Box Top 100 Singles	7
West Germany (GfK)	1

==== Year-end charts ====
Chart (1987)	Position
UK Singles (Gallup)	14

Chart (1988)	Position
Australia (ARIA)	35
Austria (Ö3 Austria Top 40)	13
Belgium (Ultratop 50 Flanders)	29
Canada Top Singles (RPM)	15
Europe (European Hot 100 Singles)	12
Netherlands (Dutch Top 40)	62
Netherlands (Single Top 100)	88
South Africa (Springbok Radio)	11
Switzerland (Schweizer Hitparade)	15
US Billboard Hot 100	80
West Germany (Media Control)	4

=== Certifications ===
Certifications for "Always on My Mind"
Region	Certification	Certified units/sales
Canada (Music Canada)	Gold	50,000^{^}
Germany (BVMI)	Gold	250,000^{^}
New Zealand (RMNZ)	Gold	15,000^{‡}
Singapore	—	20,000
Spain (Promusicae)	Platinum	60,000^{‡}
United Kingdom (BPI)	Platinum	600,000^{‡}
United States	—	270,000
^{^} Shipments figures based on certification alone.^{‡} Sales+streaming figures based on certification alone.

=== Release history ===
Release dates and formats for "Always on My Mind"
Region	Date	Format(s)	Label(s)	Ref(s).
United Kingdom	November 30, 1987	7-inch vinyl; 12-inch vinyl	Parlophone	
United Kingdom	December 7, 1987	CD; cassette	Parlophone	
United Kingdom	December 21, 1987	12-inch remix vinyl	Parlophone	
Japan	April 24, 1988	Mini-CD	EMI	

=== In popular culture ===
In 2008, a shortened version of "Always on My Mind" was included in the video game Dance Dance Revolution X for the PlayStation 2 and arcade. This song is also available in the arcade version of Dance Dance Revolution X2, which was released in 2010.

In 2017, Burberry released its holiday campaign, as directed by Alasdair McLellan, which features Cara Delevingne and actor Matt Smith. It opens with Delevingne singing "Always on My Mind" before segueing into the Pet Shop Boys cover of the song. The song is also included in the films I Now Pronounce You Chuck & Larry, Matthias & Maxime, All of Us Strangers, The Apprentice, and the Season 3 premiere of Cold Case, "Family".
