= Mississippi Arts and Entertainment Experience =

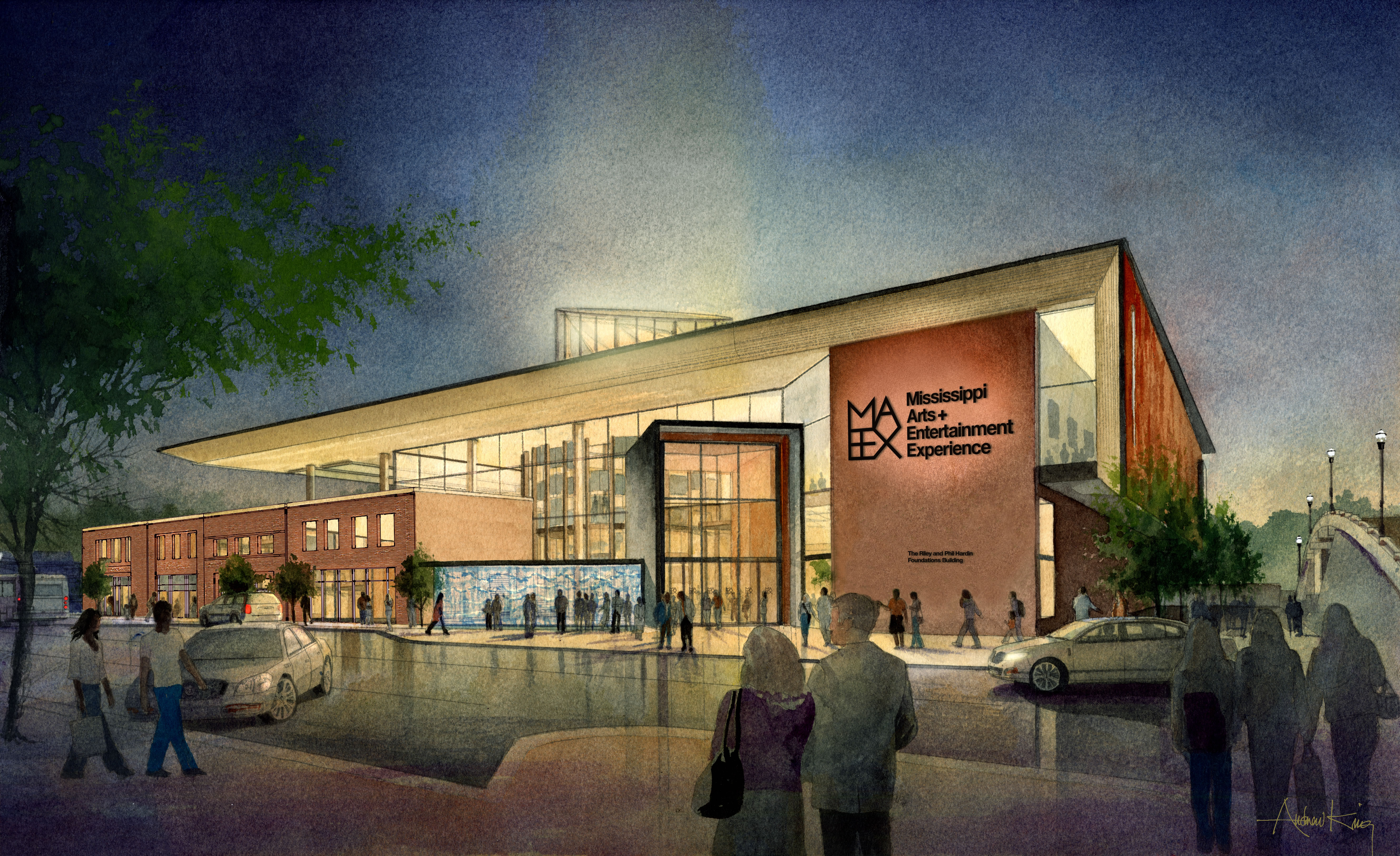
- Architect's rendering Mississippi Arts and Entertainment Experience
- Established: 2018
- Location: 2155 Front Street; Meridian, Mississippi; United States
- Coordinates: 32.3630551°N 88.7007163°W
- Type: Art museum
- Website: www.msarts.org

The Mississippi Arts and Entertainment Experience (The MAX) is an art museum that opened April 28, 2018 in downtown Meridian, Mississippi, United States. The 50 million dollar museum highlights Mississippi artists and celebrates the contributions of arts and entertainment enterprisers in every artistic discipline. The museum opened during Mississippi's bicentennial celebration. The institution's principal mission is education of the public by recognizing and honoring legendary artists and entertainers through interactive exhibits that visually, auditorily, and kinesthetically challenge, entertain, and inform visitors. The MAX housed in a contemporary, two-level structure contains 58,500 square feet of space. The facility was designed and planned by Meridian-based architectural firm, LPK Architects, P.A. with exhibit design by Gallagher & Associates.

The exhibits are organized around six themes: Land, Community, Home, Church, People + Places, and Global Community. Within these six themes, there are 15 total permanent galleries of exhibits and two spaces for changing exhibits. Audio and video stories are used to communicate who, what, where, when, why, and how Mississippians have influenced all areas of the arts and the creative economy all over the world. Other elements include a Mississippi Arts + Entertainment Hall of Fame, museum store, recording studio, both a 2D art studio (painting and drawing) and a 3D art studio (ceramics), multi-purpose gallery, outdoor amphitheater, second-floor terrace, and courtyard.

Walk of Fame

A Hollywood-style Walk of Fame, unveiled in 2009, makes its way from the nearby Mississippi State University Riley Center to the MAX site. New Walk of Fame stars will accompany the earlier state legends, including Elvis Presley, Jimmie Rodgers, B.B. King, William Faulkner, Morgan Freeman, Walter Inglis Anderson, Hartley Peavey, Sela Ward and others.
