= Elvis Sings Hits from His Movies, Volume 1 =

Compilation album by Elvis Presley
- Released: June 1972
- Genre: Rock
- Label: RCA Camden

Elvis Presley chronology
He Touched Me (1972)	Elvis Sings Hits from His Movies, Volume 1 (1972)	Elvis: As Recorded At Madison Square Garden (1972)

Elvis Sings Hits from His Movies, Volume 1 is a compilation album by American singer and musician Elvis Presley, featuring tracks from four of his movies plus two non-movie tracks. The album was released in June 1972. It was certified Gold and Platinum on January 6, 2004 by the RIAA.

The collection reached no. 87 on the Billboard album chart.

== Track listing ==
Side one
No.	Title	Length
1.	"Down by the Riverside" / "When the Saints Go Marching In" (from Frankie and Johnny)	1:55
2.	"They Remind Me Too Much of You" (from It Happened at the World's Fair)	2:30
3.	"Confidence" (from Clambake)	2:31
4.	"Frankie and Johnny" (from Frankie and Johnny)	2:33
5.	"Guitar Man" (non-movie bonus track from the Clambake soundtrack album)	2:20

Side two
No.	Title	Length
1.	"Long Legged Girl (with the Short Dress On)" (from Double Trouble)	1:27
2.	"You Don't Know Me" (from Clambake)	2:31
3.	"How Would You Like To Be?" (from It Happened at the World's Fair)	3:26
4.	"Big Boss Man" (non-movie bonus track from the Clambake soundtrack album)	2:53
5.	"Old MacDonald" (from Double Trouble)	2:04
