= He Walks Beside Me =

Compilation album by Elvis Presley
- Released: February 13, 1978
- Genre: Gospel
- Label: RCA Victor
- Producer: Felton Jarvis

Elvis Presley chronology
Elvis in Concert (1977)	He Walks Beside Me (1978)	Mahalo from Elvis (1978)

Professional ratings
Review scores
Source	Rating
The Rolling Stone Album Guide	3/5 stars

He Walks Beside Me: Favorite Songs of Faith and Inspiration is an Elvis Presley gospel album released by RCA Records (AFL1-2772) on February 13, 1978. The album was made up of music recorded from 1966 to 1972. The 'live' performance of "The Impossible Dream" and the outtake of "If I Can Dream" had been previously unreleased. The album peaked at No. 113 on the Billboard 200 albums chart, on June 9, 1978.

== Track listing ==
Side 1:

1. "He Is My Everything"
2. "Miracle of the Rosary"
3. "Where Did They Go, Lord?"
4. "Somebody Bigger Than You and I"
5. "An Evening Prayer"
6. "The Impossible Dream"

Side 2:

1. "If I Can Dream"
2. "Padre"
3. "Known Only to Him"
4. "Who Am I?"
5. "How Great Thou Art"
