= Gobo (recording) =

Movable acoustic isolation panel

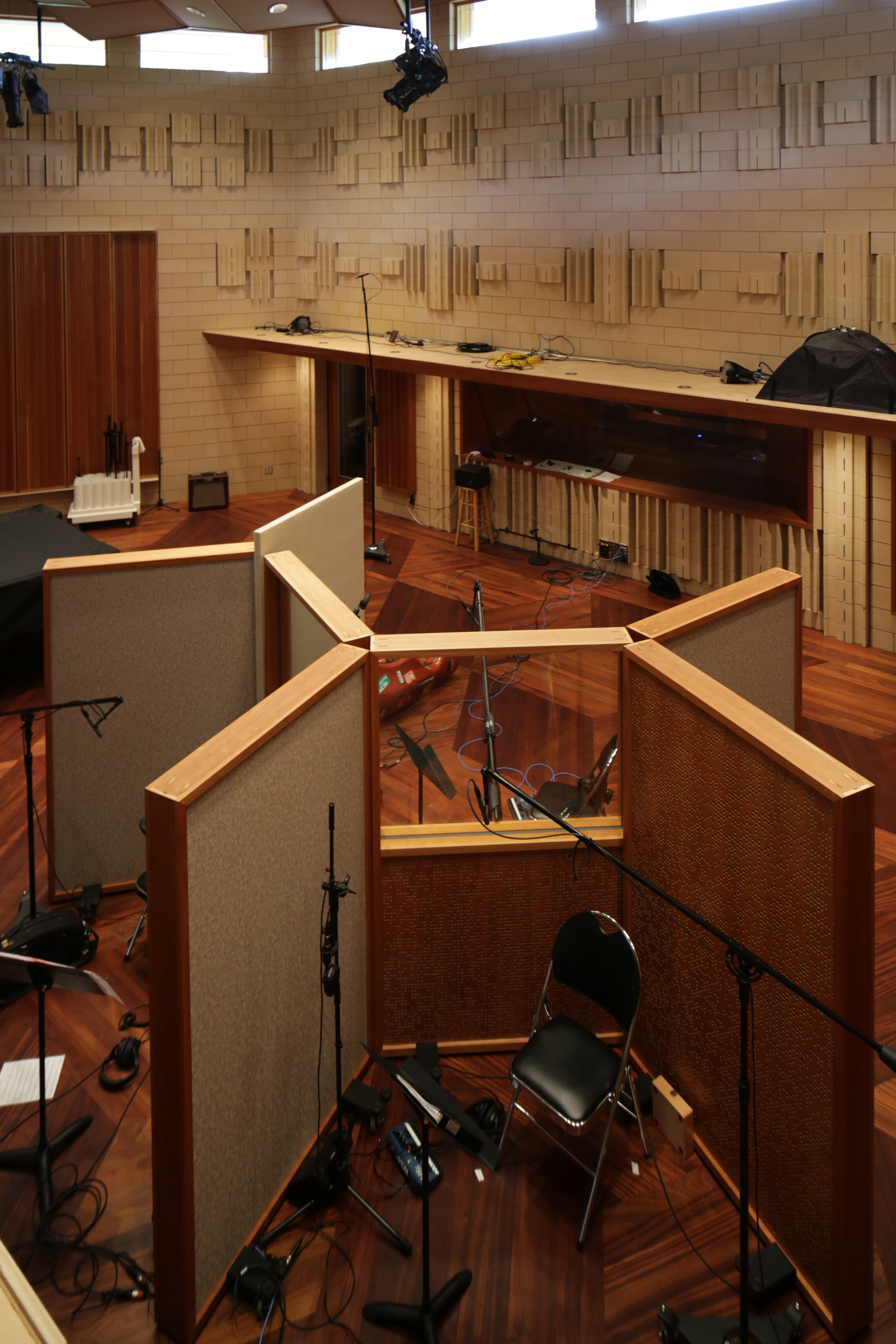
Gobo panels in a recording studio

Gobo is a sound recording term for a movable acoustic isolation panel. In typical use, a recording engineer might put a gobo between two musicians to increase the isolation of their microphones from each other.

The origin of the term "gobo" is obscure, but is most likely short for "go-between".

== Use ==
Gobo panels control the acoustical properties of a room by absorbing and diffusing sound waves. Uses include treating recording and mixing areas for unwanted reverberation, or to separate two or more musicians so they can play close to each other with separate microphones. Gobo panels are typically constructed to accommodate portability and storage, an advantage over more permanent acoustical room treatments.

== Construction ==
A gobo typically consists of a wooden panel covered with foam, carpeting or other materials with sound damping properties. A gobo can rest directly on the floor or be raised on adjustable legs.
