= Burning Love =

1972 song

"Burning Love" is a 1972 song written by Dennis Linde, originally released by Arthur Alexander in April 1972 on his album Arthur Alexander, and covered by Elvis Presley four months later that same year as a single. Linde released a version of the song himself in 1973.

== Arthur Alexander's original recording ==
"Burning Love"

Song by Arthur Alexander

from the album Arthur Alexander
- Released: April 1972
- Recorded: November 1971
- Studio: FAME Studios, Muscle Shoals, Alabama
- Genre: Southern soul
- Length: 2:41
- Label: Warner Bros.
- Songwriter: Dennis Linde
- Producer: Tommy Cogbill

Arthur Alexander, known for his influence on artists such as the Beatles and the Rolling Stones, recorded "Burning Love" during his final years at Warner Bros. Records. Alexander's version was released in April 1971 on his album Arthur Alexander, and was released as a single after Elvis's single.

== Elvis Presley version ==
"Burning Love"

Single by Elvis Presley

from the album Burning Love and Hits from His Movies, Volume 2
- B-side: "It's a Matter of Time"
- Released: August 1, 1972
- Recorded: March 28 and April 27, 1972
- Studio: RCA, Hollywood; RCA Studio B, Nashville
- Genre: Rock and roll; Southern soul
- Length: 2:50
- Label: RCA Victor
- Songwriter: Dennis Linde
- Producer: Felton Jarvis

Elvis Presley singles chronology
"An American Trilogy" (1971)	"Burning Love" / "It's a Matter of Time" (1972)	"Separate Ways" / "Always on My Mind" (1971)

Music video
- "Burning Love" on YouTube

Elvis Presley's version was released as a single on August 1, 1972, with the B-side "It's a Matter of Time", and it reached number 36 in the country charts. Elvis had recorded it at RCA's Hollywood studios on March 28, 1972. It was his final Top 10 big hit in the American Hot 100 or pop charts, peaking at number 2.

== Recording ==
Since July 1969, Presley had been performing a concert residency in Las Vegas with a select group of musicians called the TCB Band. In March 1972, the band and Presley went to RCA Studio C in Hollywood, California, to record a new album and practice for the next series of concerts. Bassist Emory Gordy was new to the group, joining veteran guitarists James Burton, John Wilkinson, and Charlie Hodge, along with drummer Ronnie Tutt and pianist Glen Hardin. Presley's personal assistant Joe Esposito was also listed on guitar, though he was not a musician. The studio was small, which Presley preferred for the feeling of intimacy. He sang in the main room with the musicians, not in an isolation booth. He liked to use a handheld microphone for these sessions, an Electro-Voice RE16 model. A blanket was thrown over the piano and gobos positioned around drums and guitar amps to reduce leakage between instruments. RCA staff engineer Rick Ruggieri captured the songs on an Ampex 16-track tape recorder.

Three days were scheduled for the recording sessions. The first day, March 27, Presley and the band recorded "Separate Ways", "For the Good Times" and "Where Do I Go from Here". This was the first time that this TCB Band lineup performed together. On March 28, Presley balked at recording "Burning Love" because he did not think it was appropriate. It was a gospel-rock song unlike the romantic ballads he had been recording. Presley's friend Jerry Schilling was there; he said, "Elvis didn't hate the song, he just wasn't in the mood for it." Everyone else in the room insisted that the song had promise, so Presley gave it a good effort. The gospel quartet J. D. Sumner & the Stamps supplied backing vocals. The next day, a film crew shot footage of the band playing together, recording more songs including "It's a Matter of Time".

In April, the project moved to Nashville's RCA Studio B where Presley had recorded many earlier hits. Overdubs were recorded by RCA engineer Al Pachucki. On April 27, songwriter Dennis Linde laid down the song's intro riff on guitar, and Jerry Carrigan added percussion accents, especially cowbell.

=== Critical reception ===
For the week of October 28, 1972, "Burning Love" rose to number 2 on the Billboard Hot 100. It reached number 1 on Billboard's rival Cashbox's pop charts during the week of November 11, 1972. The song was Elvis's 40th and final Top Ten hit on the Billboard US charts.

The song was also released on an album titled Burning Love and Hits from His Movies, Volume 2 on November 1, 1972. Despite this album's subtitle, the only actual hit on the album was the title song.

=== Personnel ===
Partial credits from Keith Flynn and Ernst Jorgensen's examination of session tapes, RCA and AFM union paperwork, and the recollection of RCA engineer Rick Ruggieri in 2013.

- Elvis Presley – lead vocals
- James Burton, Charlie Hodge, Joe Esposito, John Wilkinson, Dennis Linde – guitar
- Emory Gordy Jr. – bass
- Glen D. Hardin – piano
- Ronnie Tutt – drums
- J. D. Sumner & the Stamps (Bill Baize, Ed Enoch, Donnie Sumner, Richard Sterban) – backing vocals
- Jerry Carrigan – percussion, cowbell
- Rick Ruggieri – engineer in Hollywood
- Al Pachucki – engineer in Nashville

=== Charts ===
==== Weekly charts ====
Chart (1972)	Peak position
Australia	37
Australian Go-Set Charts	2
Belgium	17
Canada RPM Top Singles	2
Germany	31
Ireland (IRMA)	6
Italy	28
Netherlands	17
New Zealand (Listener)	9
South Africa	7
Switzerland	72
United Kingdom	7
US Billboard Hot 100	2
US Easy Listening (Billboard)	9
US Cash Box Top 100	1

==== Year-end charts ====
Chart (1972)	Rank
US Cash Box Top 100	63

=== Certifications ===
Region	Certification	Certified units/sales
New Zealand (RMNZ)	Platinum	30,000^{‡}
Spain (Promusicae)	Gold	30,000^{‡}
United Kingdom (BPI)	Platinum	600,000^{‡}
United States (RIAA)	Platinum	1,000,000^{^}
^{^} Shipments figures based on certification alone.^{‡} Sales+streaming figures based on certification alone.

== Other versions ==
A new backing track for the song was recorded in 1980, intended for the Guitar Man album. It went unreleased until 2000. The musicians on this session were Jerry Shook on guitar, Larry Byrom on electric guitar, Mike Leech on bass, David Briggs on piano, and Larrie Londin on drums.

In 2002, country singer Wynonna Judd covered the song for the soundtrack of the Disney film Lilo & Stitch, with Nyjah Music & Zyah Rhythm covering the song in the 2025 live action remake.

In 2010, the Las Vegas show Viva Elvis by Cirque du Soleil included a radical reworking of the song. Only Presley's vocal was retained from the 1972 recording sessions. The guitar part was sampled from the Hives' "Walk Idiot Walk", added to a distorted bassline and rollicking, pounding drums. NPR described it as "a mind-blowing, left-field recasting" of the original.

In 2015, a new orchestral arrangement for the song was recorded accompanied by the Royal Philharmonic Orchestra and was released on album If I Can Dream.
