= Separate Ways (Elvis Presley album) =

Compilation album by Elvis Presley
- Released: December 1, 1972
- Genre: Rhythm and blues, pop, country, rock
- Label: RCA Camden

Elvis Presley chronology
Burning Love and Hits from His Movies, Volume 2 (1972)	Separate Ways (1972)	Aloha from Hawaii Via Satellite (1973)

Separate Ways is a compilation album issued by RCA Records on December 1, 1972 from American singer and musician Elvis Presley. Released on the budget RCA Camden label shortly after another similar compilation, Burning Love and Hits from His Movies, Volume 2, Separate Ways was the second and final attempt by RCA to repackage older Elvis recordings by pairing them with a recent chart hit, in this case "Separate Ways" and its flipside "Always On My Mind".

Separate Ways peaked on the Billboard chart at number 46 and the Country Album chart at number 12 on its release and has since gone on to sell over 3 million copies worldwide. It was certified gold on March 27, 1992, and platinum on January 6, 2004, by the RIAA.

Apart from "Separate Ways" and "Always On My Mind", the remainder of the album — which was not promoted as a compilation on the front cover — consists of previously released recordings from 1960s Presley film soundtracks, plus one song, "Old Shep", originally issued on Elvis' second album, released in 1956. In the mid-1970s, The Pickwick Records label leased the rights to reissue several albums from the RCA Camden catalog. Separate Ways was reissued on the Pickwick label with the original RCA Camden cover art and catalog number, CAS-2611. After Presley's unexpected death in August 1977, demand for his recordings skyrocketed and RCA sought to reclaim the rights to their Pickwick/Camden recordings. In 1991, Separate Ways was reissued for the first time on compact disc in the "RCA Camden Classics" series. RCA reissued the album on CD again in 2006 as part of another reissue series featuring most of Presley's RCA Camden albums.

== Title track ==
Presley recorded "Separate Ways", written by Red West and Richard Mainegra, on March 27, 1972, and the country song "Always On My Mind" on March 29. They were released together as a single on October 31, 1972. It reached gold status in the US for sales of over half a million copies. It was listed as a double-sided hit reaching #16 on Billboard's Hot Country Singles chart in November 1972. In the UK "Always On My Mind" was the hit song and "Separate Ways" was the B-side.

Professional ratings
Review scores
Source	Rating
Allmusic	link

== Track listing ==
Side one
No.	Title	Writer(s)	Recording date	Length
1.	"Separate Ways"	Richard Mainegra and Red West	March 27, 1972	2:38
2.	"Sentimental Me"	James Cassin, James T. Morehead	March 12, 1961	2:34
3.	"In My Way" (from Wild in the Country)	Ben Weisman, Fred Wise	November 7, 1960	1:24
4.	"I Met Her Today"	Hal Blair, Don Robertson	October 15, 1961	2:45
5.	"What Now, What Next, Where To?"	Hal Blair, Don Robertson	May 26, 1963	1:59

Side two
No.	Title	Writer(s)	Recording date	Length
1.	"Always on My Mind"	Johnny Christopher, Mark James and Wayne Carson	March 29, 1972	3:41
2.	"I Slipped, I Stumbled, I Fell" (from Wild in the Country)	Ben Weisman, Fred Wise	November 8, 1960	1:38
3.	"Is It So Strange"	Faron Young	January 19, 1957	2:31
4.	"Forget Me Never" (from Wild in the Country)	Ben Weisman, Fred Wise	November 7, 1960	1:38
5.	"Old Shep"	Red Foley	September 2, 1956	4:10
