= Separate Ways (Elvis Presley song) =

Single by Elvis Presley

from the album Separate Ways
- B-side: "Always on My Mind"
- Released: October 31, 1972
- Recorded: March 27, 1972
- Studio: RCA Studio C, Hollywood
- Genre: Pop; country
- Length: 2:38
- Label: RCA Victor
- Songwriters: Red West, Richard Mainegra

Elvis Presley singles chronology
"Burning Love" / "It's a Matter of Time" (1972)	"Separate Ways" / "Always on My Mind" (1972)	"Steamroller Blues" / "Fool" (1973)

"Separate Ways" is a 1972 song by Elvis Presley written by Red West and Richard Mainegra. Elvis Presley recorded the song on March 27, 1972, and released it as a single with "Always On My Mind" as the B-side. It reached gold status in the US for sales of over half a million copies. It was listed as a double-sided hit reaching No. 16 on Billboard magazine's Hot Country Singles chart in November 1972. In the UK "Always On My Mind" was the hit song and "Separate Ways" was the B-side.

== Song information ==
Richard Mainegra had the following to say about the song. "It's a big understatement to say getting an Elvis cut was the highlight of my career. At the time, I was only 22 and right out of Slidell into the music business. I was very excited to be doing what I'd always wanted to do. I'd only had about three songs cut so far – the Yellow Pages, Gary Puckett, and Pat Boone. I had stars in my eyes, but I wasn't prepared for what was about to happen.

Red West, who co-wrote the song, was one of the 'Memphis Mafia' – Elvis' bodyguards and buddies. At the time, he was heading the publishing company I happened to stumble into a year earlier. One day I had a melody going that Red really liked, so he began writing lyrics to it. Before long, he had a look of real excitement in his eyes as if he knew we had something special going. We started leaning the story line toward Elvis' break-up with Priscilla and how it affected their daughter. He told me when it was finished Elvis was going to cut the song. I let that go in one ear and out the other. I thought, 'No way!' First of all, why would Elvis want to sing about his personal life that was already being dragged through the media every day? And, secondly, there was no way little ole 'small town, green me' was going to get a song cut by the one artist every songwriter in the world wanted to sing their song!

Red telephoned me one night a few months later and played a rough cut of the recording – I was actually listening to ELVIS PRESLEY singing the song that I had co-written! I've never been higher in my life than at that moment! We eventually got word that our song would definitely be on an album. Sometimes you get a song cut, but it never makes the final 10 or 12 songs that actually go on an album. A few months later, after we all had moved to Nashville, we got word that it was going to be the flip side of the single 'Always on My Mind'. How cool that was!!! A few weeks later, we were informed 'Separate Ways' was going to be released as a pop single. I've had cuts by some pretty major artists since then, but nothing has ever matched the feeling I had when I first heard 'The King' sing a song of which I was lucky to be a part!"

== Chart performance ==
Chart (1972/73)	Peak position
US Billboard Hot 100	20
US Billboard Easy Listening	3
US Billboard Hot Country Singles	16

== Cover versions ==
- In 1973, Andre Kostelanetz and His Orchestra covered "Separate Ways" on his album Last Tango in Paris.
