= Burning Love and Hits from His Movies, Volume 2 =

Compilation album by Elvis Presley
- Released: November 1, 1972
- Genre: Rock
- Length: 23:21
- Label: RCA Camden

Elvis Presley chronology
As Recorded at Madison Square Garden (1972)	Burning Love and Hits from His Movies, Volume 2 (1972)	Separate Ways (1972)

Burning Love and Hits from His Movies, Volume 2 is a compilation album by American singer and musician Elvis Presley. The album was released on November 1, 1972, on the budget label, RCA Camden. The contents of the album consist primarily of soundtrack recordings from various Presley films of the 1960s, augmented by both sides of his 1972 hit single, "Burning Love". RCA Records generally issued Presley's recordings on the standard Victor label, rather than the budget Camden label; a similar compilation album on RCA Camden, Separate Ways, was issued a month later, which also featured a recent chart hit leading a collection of older, non-hit soundtrack recordings.

Upon its release, the album reached number 22 on the Billboard pop album chart and number 10 on the Billboard country chart. In the mid-1970s, RCA Records leased the rights to reissue certain Camden recordings by Presley and other RCA recording artists to the budget reissue label Pickwick Records. Burning Love was reissued with the same cover art on the Pickwick label. After Presley's unexpected death in August, 1977, demand for his recordings increased dramatically; RCA sought to reclaim the rights to their Pickwick/Camden recordings, and reissued and repackaged several of them. RCA first reissued Burning Love on compact disc in 1987 as part of the "RCA Camden Classics" series. The album was certified Gold on March 27, 1992, Platinum on July 15, 1999, and 2× Platinum on January 6, 2004, by the RIAA. RCA reissued the Burning Love album on CD again in 2007, as part of a reissue series featuring most of Presley's RCA Camden albums.

== Track listing ==
Side one
No.	Title	Writer(s)	Recording date	Length
1.	"Burning Love"	Dennis Linde	March 28, 1972	2:50
2.	"Tender Feeling" (from Kissin' Cousins)	Bernie Baum, Bill Giant, Florence Kaye	September 29, 1963	2:32
3.	"Am I Ready?" (from Spinout)	Roy C. Bennett, Sid Tepper	February 16, 1966	2:24
4.	"Tonight Is So Right for Love" (from G.I. Blues)	Joseph Lilley, Abner Silver, Sid Wayne	April 27, 1960	2:11
5.	"Guadalajara" (from Fun in Acapulco)	Pepe Guízar	January 23, 1963	2:42

Side two
No.	Title	Writer(s)	Recording date	Length
1.	"It's a Matter of Time"	Clive Westlake	March 29, 1972	3:04
2.	"No More" (from Blue Hawaii)	Hal Blair, Don Robertson	March 21, 1961	2:21
3.	"Santa Lucia" (from Viva Las Vegas)	Traditional: Arranged by Elvis Presley	July 10, 1963	1:11
4.	"We'll Be Together" (from Girls! Girls! Girls!)	Dudley Brooks, Charles O'Curran	March–May 1962	2:14
5.	"I Love Only One Girl" (from Double Trouble)	Roy C. Bennett, Sid Tepper	June 29, 1966	1:51

== Personnel ==
- Elvis Presley — guitar, lead vocals
- The Jordanaires — background vocals except "Burning Love" and "It's A Matter of Time"
- Scotty Moore — guitar
- D.J. Fontana — drums, percussion
- Buddy Harman — drums, percussion
- Bob Moore — double bass
- Tiny Timbrell – guitar or mandolin on "Tonight Is So Right For Love"
- Hank Garland – guitar on "No More"
- Tommy Tedesco – lead guitar
- J.D. Sumner & the Stamps — background vocals on "Burning Love" and "It's A Matter of Time"
- James Burton — lead guitar on "Burning Love" and "It's A Matter of Time"
- Dennis Linde — lead/rhythm guitar on "Burning Love"
- Emory Gordy Jr. — bass guitar on "Burning Love" and "It's A Matter of Time"
- Glen D. Hardin — piano on "Burning Love" and "It's A Matter of Time"
- Ron Tutt — drums on "Burning Love" and "It's A Matter of Time"
