= Stewart Francke =

American singer-songwriter (1958–2025)

Stewart Francke (September 15, 1958 – May 9, 2025) was an American singer, musician and songwriter in Detroit.

== Life and career ==
Francke was born in Saginaw, Michigan on September 15, 1958. According to Pete Wurdock, Francke's manager, Stewart started performing music when he turned 19 years old. Bob Baldori, a founding member of The Woolies and a blues musician from the Midwest, served as his mentor during his formative years.

Before focusing on music full-time, Francke worked as a music journalist for newspapers nationally, including the Detroit Metro Times, after graduating from the University of Redlands in California.

One of his later CDs, Heartless World, released in May 2011, features a guest appearance by Bruce Springsteen. His album, Motor City Serenade, was recorded with the legendary Motown session band The Funk Brothers.

Francke's music won numerous awards: nine Detroit music awards, Hour Detroit's most popular musician 2002–2004, four straight ASCAP writer's awards, and the prestigious Point of Light Award for his work in cancer care. The Stewart Francke Leukemia Foundation (SFLF) was also presented the Partnership In Humanity Award by the Detroit Newspapers, and he was awarded a Creative Artist Grant by Artserve Michigan in 2003.

In 2009, Stewart Francke received the 20th Anniversary Lifetime Achievement Arts Award from his hometown of Saginaw.

Francke died on the morning of May 9, 2025, due to complications from a stroke he suffered in 2019. He was 66.

== Discography ==
- 1995: Where the River Meets the Bay (Schoolkids Records)
- 1996: Expecting Heroes (Wild Justice)
- 1997: House of Lights (Blue Boundary Records)
- 1998: Sunflower Soul Serenade (Blue Boundary Records)
- 1999: Swimming in Mercury (Blue Boundary Records)
- 2000: What We Talk of ... When We Talk (Blue Boundary Records)
- 2001: Kiss Kiss Bang Bang: Best of Stewart Francke (Blue Boundary Records)
- 2002: Wheel of Life (Blue Boundary Records)
- 2005: Motor City Serenade (Zane Records)
- 2008: Alive and Unplugged at The Ark (Zane Records)
- 2011: Heartless World (Blue Boundary Records)
- 2012: Love Implied (Blue Boundary Records)
- 2013: A Familiar Fire (Blue Boundary Records)
- 2015: Midwestern---The Best of Stewart Francke.
