= Mr. B =

Mr. B may refer to:

- Mr. B (album), an album by jazz trumpeter Chet Baker

== People ==
- George Balanchine, choreographer, co-founder and balletmaster of the New York City Ballet
- Mark Braun, a boogie-woogie piano player
- Billy Eckstine, a jazz bandleader and balladeer
- A codename for John Murphy, a loyalist paramilitary from Northern Ireland
- The nickname of Bernard Lansky, the owner of the famed Lansky Brothers clothier in Memphis, Tennessee
- Mr. B The Gentleman Rhymer, alter ego of musician Jim Burke

== Characters ==
- Mr. B, a character in the literacy program The Letter People
- Mr. B, a character in Samuel Richardson's book, Pamela, or Virtue Rewarded
- Mr. B, a character in the Nigerian sitcom Basi & Company
- The nickname Hazel uses for the character George Baxter in the T.V. sitcom Hazel (1961-1966)
