= Military career of Elvis Presley =

Elvis Presley
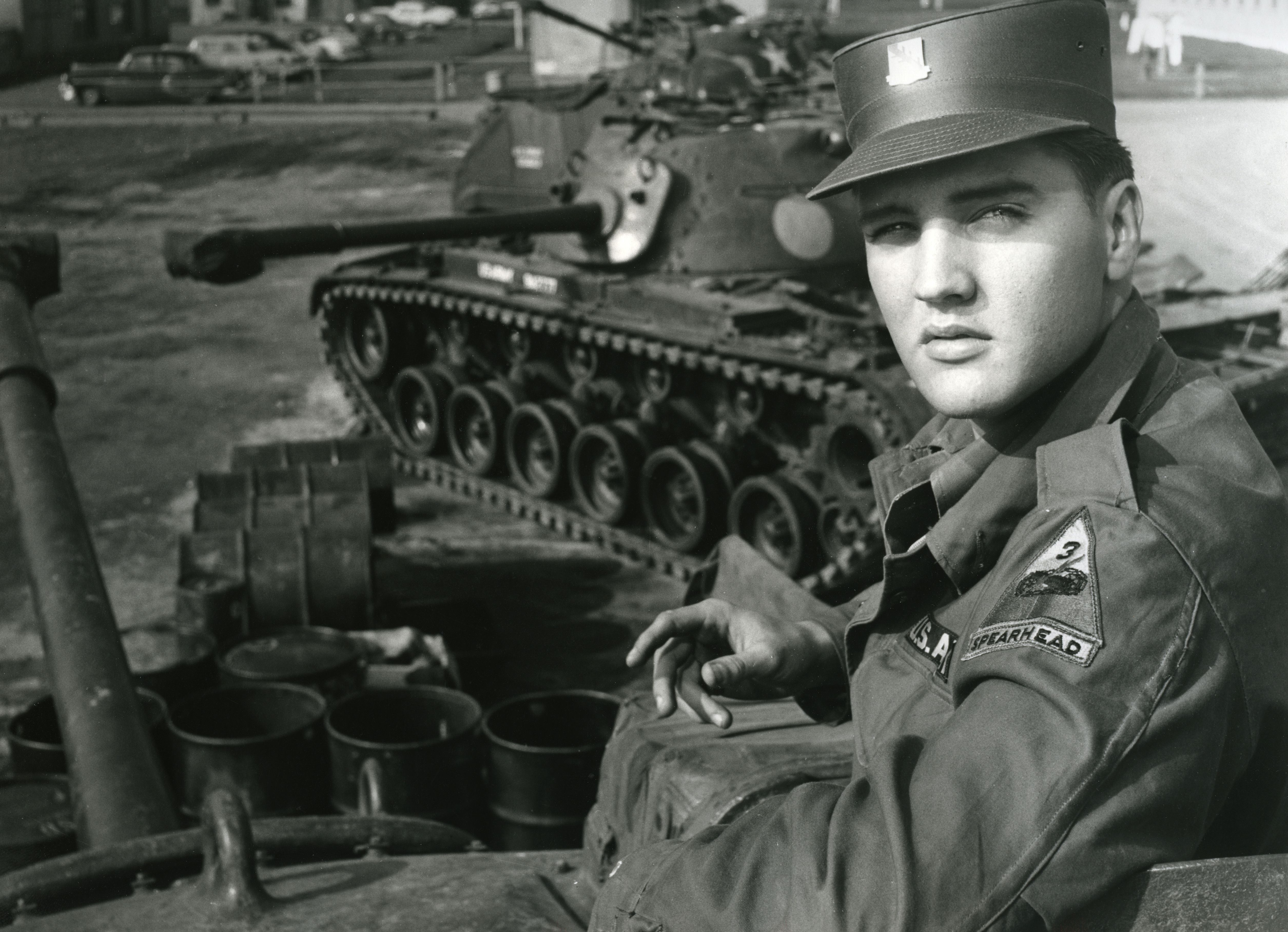
- Presley at Ray Barracks, West Germany, 1958
- Military career
- Branch: United States Army
- Service years: 1958–1960
- Rank: Sergeant
- Units: Headquarters Company, 1st Medium Tank Battalion, 32d Armor, 3d Armored Division
- Awards: Good Conduct Medal
- Memorials: Elvis Presley Circle, Friedberg; Elvis Presley Memorial, Bad Nauheim; Elvis Presley Memorial, Ober-Mörlen; Elvis Presley Memorial, Schlitz

American singer and actor Elvis Presley served in the United States Army from 1958 to 1960 after being drafted to serve in the military as an active duty soldier for two years. At the time of his enlistment, he was widely regarded as the most well-known name in the world of entertainment.

Before entering the Army, Presley had caused national outrage with his rock and roll music. Many parents, religious leaders, and teachers' groups welcomed his draft into the military. Despite being offered the chance to enlist in Special Services to entertain the troops and live in priority housing, Presley was persuaded by his manager, Colonel Tom Parker, to serve as a regular soldier. This earned him the respect of many of his fellow soldiers and people back in the United States who previously viewed him in a negative light.

During his service, Presley's life was affected in many ways. Not long before he was transferred to West Germany, his mother, Gladys Presley died of a heart attack brought on by acute hepatitis and cirrhosis at the age of 46. While he was living in Bad Nauheim, he met his future wife, Priscilla Beaulieu. He also became reliant on barbiturates and stimulants.

== The draft ==
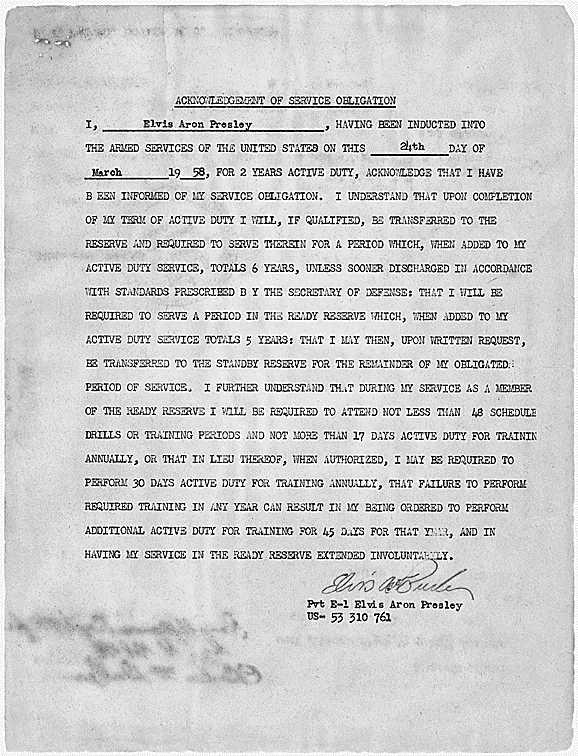
Elvis Presley's two-year active duty service obligation, March 24, 1958

On January 8, 1956, his 21st birthday, Presley became eligible to be drafted into the military. Colonel Tom Parker, Presley's manager, was well aware of his client's draft status and how it could affect his career. In the summer of 1956, Parker wrote to the Department of Defense requesting that Presley be considered for Special Services, which would allow him to do only six weeks of basic training and then resume life as normal, performing several times a year for the armed forces. However, Parker had no intention of allowing Presley to sign up for Special Service, each performance would have been recorded and filmed for sale to television stations worldwide and the armed forces would own the exclusive rights to these recordings, meaning all of the profits would be retained by the government. Parker was unwilling to allow anyone to effectively enjoy Presley's talents for free, let alone profit from them. Over the next twelve months, Parker led Presley to believe that it was still possible to avoid the draft completely, while secretly planning to allow it. In his eyes, after a year of negative publicity, this was the perfect opportunity to change the view that older Americans had of him. Parker explained to Presley that this was a situation neither of them could refuse. When Presley was told that he would have to serve as a regular soldier, he was furious that Parker failed to get him out of the draft. Parker promised Presley that if he worked hard and served as a regular GI for two years, he would return "a bigger star" than when he left.

On January 4, 1957, Presley visited Kennedy Veterans Hospital in Memphis for a pre-induction physical exam. On January 8, Presley's twenty-second birthday, he was declared 1-A by the Memphis Draft Board, meaning he was physically fit for service and likely to be drafted sometime in the next eight months. On December 16, 1957, it was officially announced that Presley would be receiving his draft notice, which he physically received on December 20. While fans around the country were upset by the news, parents and teachers' groups were ecstatic; they viewed Presley as a menace to society.

The Navy offered to create a special Elvis Presley Company made up of men from Memphis and Presley's closest friends, and offered him the chance to perform in Las Vegas and have his own private quarters. The Army offered Presley the chance to tour the world and visit army bases to boost morale among soldiers and encourage other young men to enlist. Presley politely told both parties that he would consider their offers. The Pentagon, too, had been in touch to offer Presley the opportunity to join Special Services, entertaining the troops without having to train as a regular soldier; this option was known by many soldiers and veterans as "the celebrity wimp-out". After discussing each offer with Parker, Presley eschewed any special treatment and decided to serve as a regular soldier. In Parker's words, "Taking any of these deals will make millions of Americans angry."

=== King Creole ===
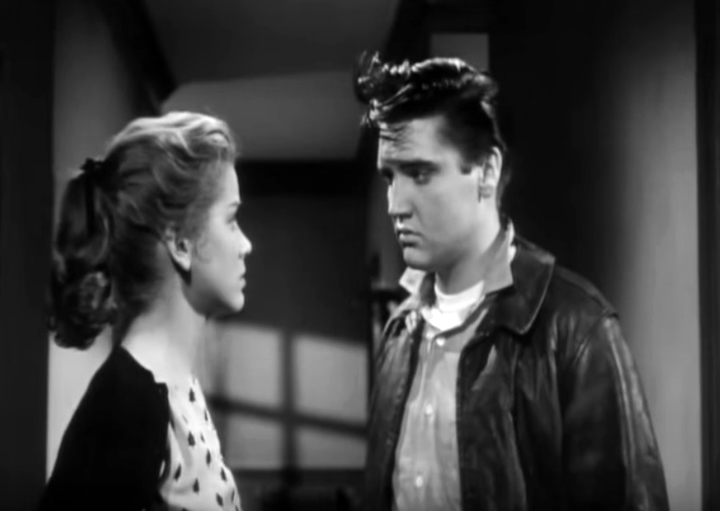
Presley with Dolores Hart in the 1958 film King Creole

Presley was originally scheduled to be inducted on January 20, 1958. However, due to commitments at Paramount and the filming schedule of his latest film, King Creole, Presley had to personally write to the Memphis Draft Board to request a deferment. He explained to them that Paramount had already spent up to $350,000 on pre-production of the film, and that many jobs were dependent on his ability to complete filming, which was due to begin on January 13. They granted him an extension until the middle of March. When news of the extension broke, angry letters were sent to the Memphis Draft Board complaining about the "special treatment" that Presley was receiving. According to Milton Bowers, head of the draft board and angered by the public outcry, Presley "would have automatically gotten the extension [anyway] if he hadn't been Elvis Presley the superstar".

Worried that rock and roll was a passing fad, Presley wanted to make King Creole the best role he had ever acted. He knew that two years out of the limelight would mean hard work when he returned, and so he gave his all in that film to show the world that he had the potential to return as a serious, dramatic actor. Author Alanna Nash described it as "the performance that would forever define his potential".

== Induction ==
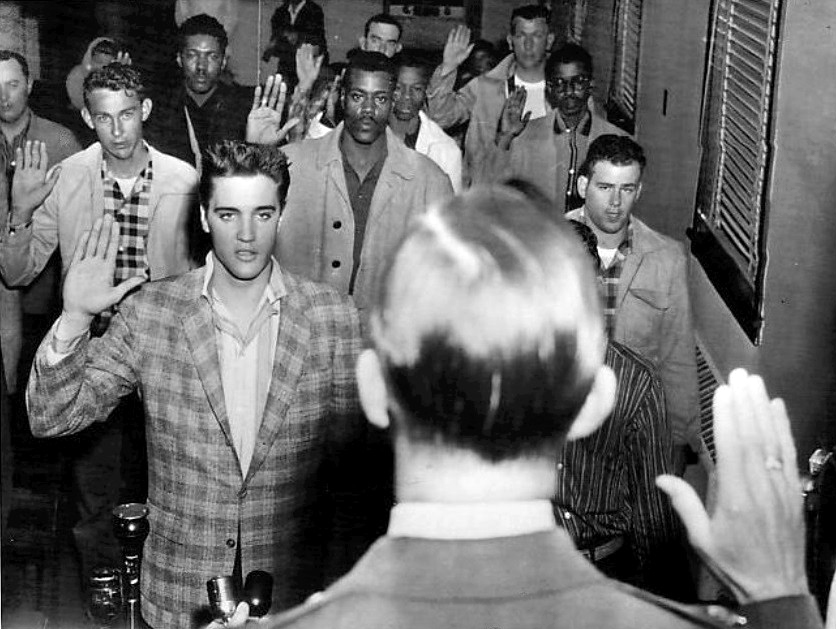
Presley being sworn into the Army on March 24, 1958, at Fort Chaffee

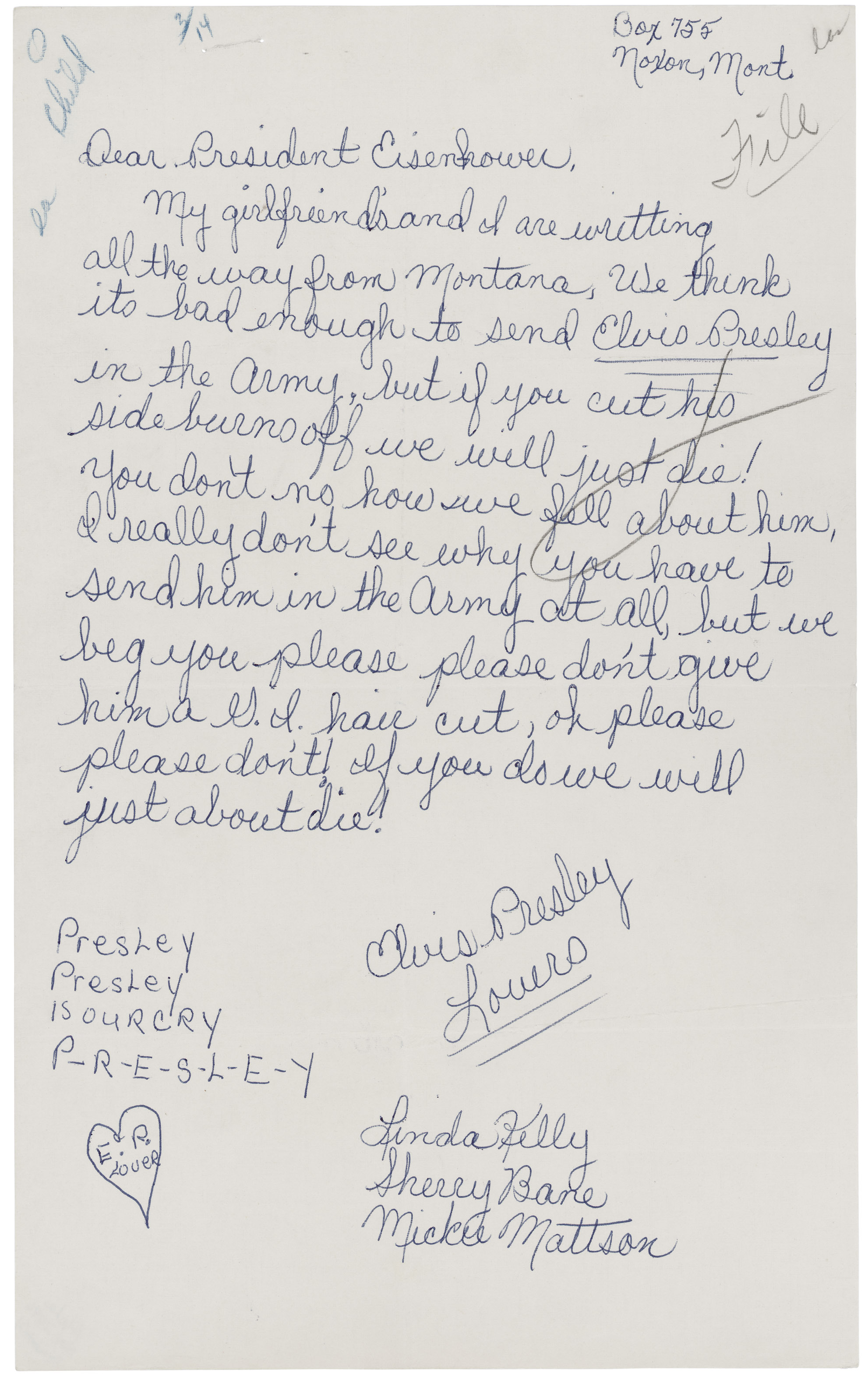
Letter sent to President Dwight D. Eisenhower by three Elvis fans from Noxon, Montana, pleading with him not to have Presley's hair cut short. The letter is preserved in the Library of Congress.

Two weeks after finishing King Creole, Presley reported for his induction on March 24, 1958, a day dubbed "Black Monday" for his fans by the press. Presley was given a medical examination and assigned service number 53310761, before being sworn in and made leader of his group. Parker, with the permission of the Army, had arranged for news crews from around the world to be on hand to report Presley's entry into the Army. After his final goodbyes to family and friends, Presley and his fellow Army recruits were taken by bus to Fort Chaffee, Arkansas.

== Fort Hood ==
Presley spent four days at Fort Chaffee before being transferred to Fort Hood, Texas. After being assigned to Company A, 2d Medium Tank Battalion, 37th Armor, Presley completed basic training by June. He had become a pistol sharpshooter, and expressed his enjoyment at the "rough and tumble" of the tanks obstacle course. To friends back home, however, he was less upbeat. In letters to friend Alan Fortas, Presley described his homesickness and insisted that he hated the training. Eddie Fadal, another of Presley's friends, remembers that Presley would worry about his career, fearing it was all over. One of Presley's instructors, Bill Norwood, who let Presley use his phone to call home on many occasions, recalls Presley breaking down in tears during many of these phone calls.

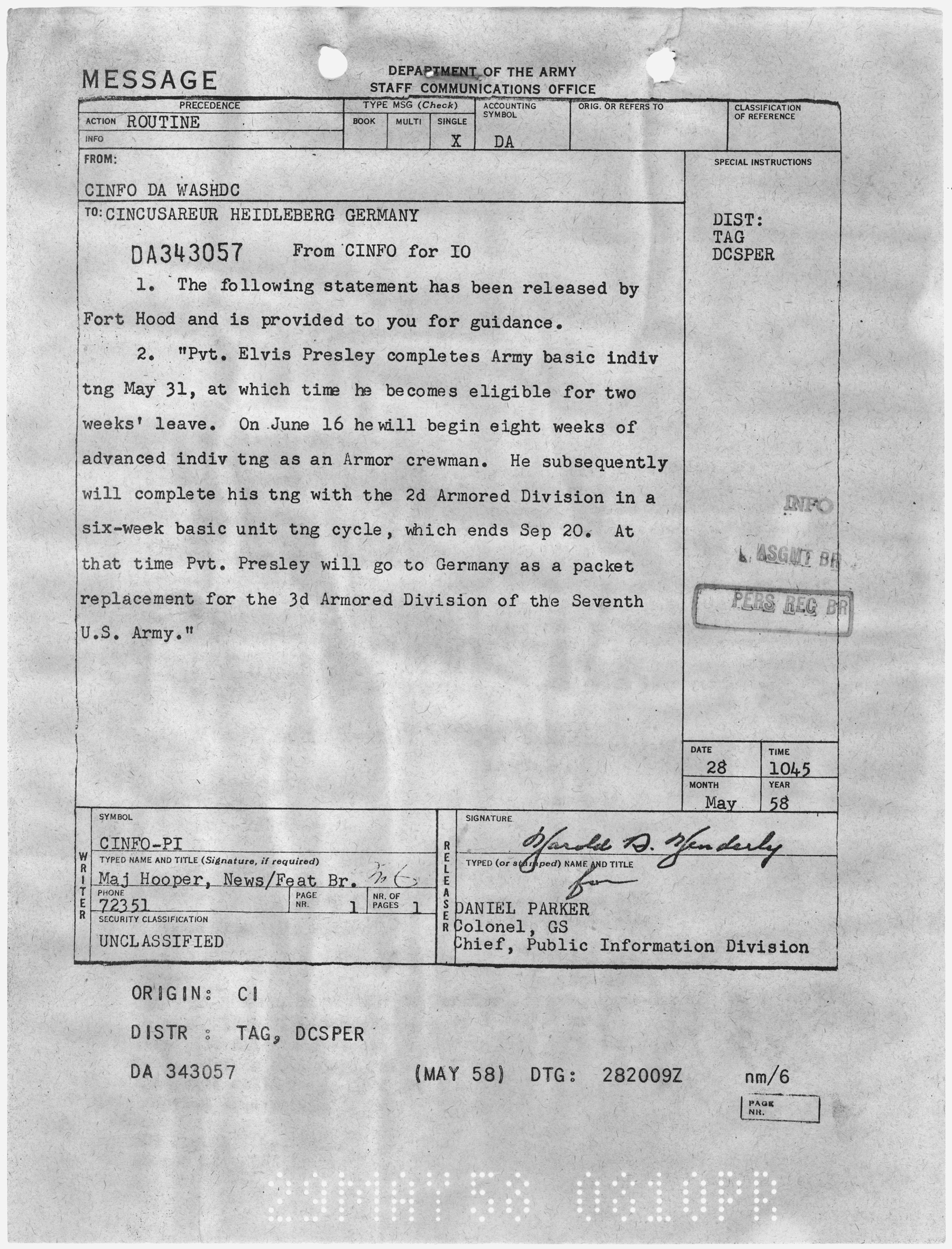
Message from the United States Army Public Information Division releasing information about Elvis Presley's basic and advanced training, with approximate date of assignment to the 3d Armored Division in West Germany

After a short break to record new material for RCA Victor in June, Presley returned to Fort Hood to finish his tank training. He was now living off post, in his own house, with his mother, father, grandmother, and friend Lamar Fike; soldiers who had dependents living off post were allowed to live with them. Having his family close by cheered him up immensely, although he still spoke to friends about his fears for his career. Parker, who was often a visitor to Presley's home, would attempt to reassure his client. Parker had arranged for enough material and merchandise to be available to keep Presley's name in the public arena during his two years in the service. Although Presley nodded along in agreement with his manager, he was not really convinced that he could return to what he had known previously.

=== Mother's death ===
In early August, while in Texas with her son, Gladys Presley took ill. She had recently increased her alcohol intake to cope with her son's fame and army commitments, and she had also begun using diet pills to attempt to lose weight. This, coupled with a poor diet, had led to the deterioration of her liver function. One afternoon, after a heated argument with her husband Vernon, Gladys collapsed from exhaustion. Presley arranged for her and Vernon to return to Memphis on August 8. The next day, Gladys' condition worsened so rapidly that she was rushed to a hospital. On August 11, after calls from her doctor, Presley requested emergency leave to visit with his mother. After initially being turned down and threatening to go absent without leave, Presley was eventually given permission to leave on August 12. The officer who initially denied Presley his emergency leave was later disciplined for his actions.

On August 14, Gladys died from cirrhosis; her official cause of death was listed as a heart attack, but the Presleys refused an autopsy to verify it. Elvis and Vernon were both devastated by her death. Her funeral was held on August 15, and Presley collapsed with grief several times before, during, and after the service. His mother had always been the most important person in his life, and now he felt as though everything he had worked for had been for nothing. Presley's leave was extended by five days on August 18, and when he finally left to return to Fort Hood, he left instructions that nothing in his mother's room was to be altered.

== West Germany ==
=== 1958 ===
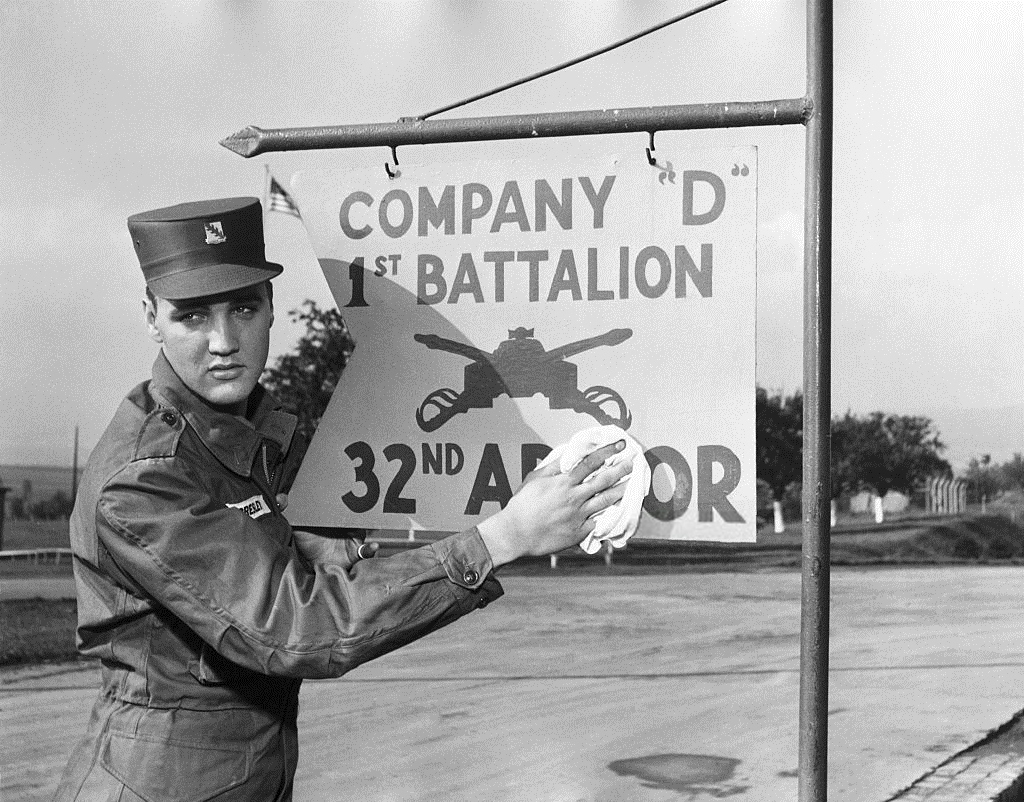
Presley shortly after his arrival

After training at Fort Hood, Presley was reassigned to the 1st Medium Tank Battalion, 32d Armor, 3d Armored Division, at Ray Barracks, West Germany, where he served as an armor intelligence specialist. He left Fort Hood on September 19, headed for Brooklyn Army Terminal in New York where he would ship out to West Germany on September 22. After a short press conference arranged by Parker, which also involved Presley walking up and down the plank of the USS General George M. Randall eight times for cameras, the ship set sail and Presley would spend the rest of his service overseas.

During the crossing Presley became a friend of a fellow soldier named Charlie Hodge. Hodge, who had enjoyed some success as an entertainer himself before being drafted, encouraged Presley to help him put together a show for the troops. Presley accepted his request, but only agreed to play piano in the background; Parker had drilled into him that there would be no public performances of any kind during his service. Hodge would become a close friend to Presley during their time in the army, and he was invited to work for him when they were both discharged.

On October 1 the USS General George M. Randall arrived in West Germany. Presley was once again offered the chance to join Special Services, but politely refused. He was instead given the task of being the chauffeur for the commanding officer of Company D, a Captain Russell. Russell, however, did not take kindly to the attention surrounding Presley, and he was transferred to driving duties for Reconnaissance Platoon Sergeant Ira Jones of Company C.

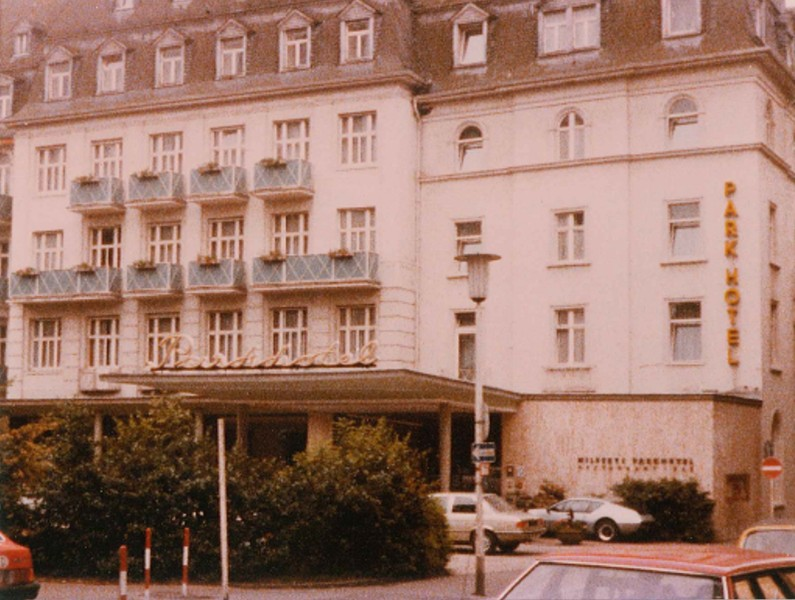
Hilbert's Park Hotel, Bad Nauheim

Shortly after arriving in West Germany, Presley was allowed to live off post. He and his family moved into Hilbert's Park Hotel in Bad Homburg then to the Hotel Villa Grunewald in Bad Nauheim, a town even closer to Friedberg, where Ray Barracks was located. In the meantime, Parker wrote from the United States on a nearly daily basis to Presley about how things were going back home. He had acquired deals with RCA and 20th Century Fox to make sure Presley's return to public life would go as smoothly as possible. RCA agreed to release an album of Presley's press conference the day he left for West Germany; titled Elvis Sails, the album would pay Presley $0.22 per sale in royalties, guaranteed up to at least 100,000 copies. 20th Century Fox had agreed upon a $200,000 fee for one Presley film, with options on a second for $250,000 and a 50/50 split on profits. Paramount, as well, had signed deals to produce a number of new Presley films after his release; what would eventually become G.I. Blues was agreed upon for $175,000 and a three-picture option was also included. Parker also reassured his client about the press coverage he was receiving while overseas. News outlets were reporting regularly on stories, mostly released by Parker himself, about plans for Presley's return to entertainment. Stories of wild parties in Presley's hotel room were also making it into the papers regularly, and Parker was forced to hold a press conference to dispel these rumors. For Presley, however, being away in West Germany was not all happy times. He would often write home to friends and family about how homesick he was, how desperately he missed his mother, and of how his fears about his career still clouded his mind.

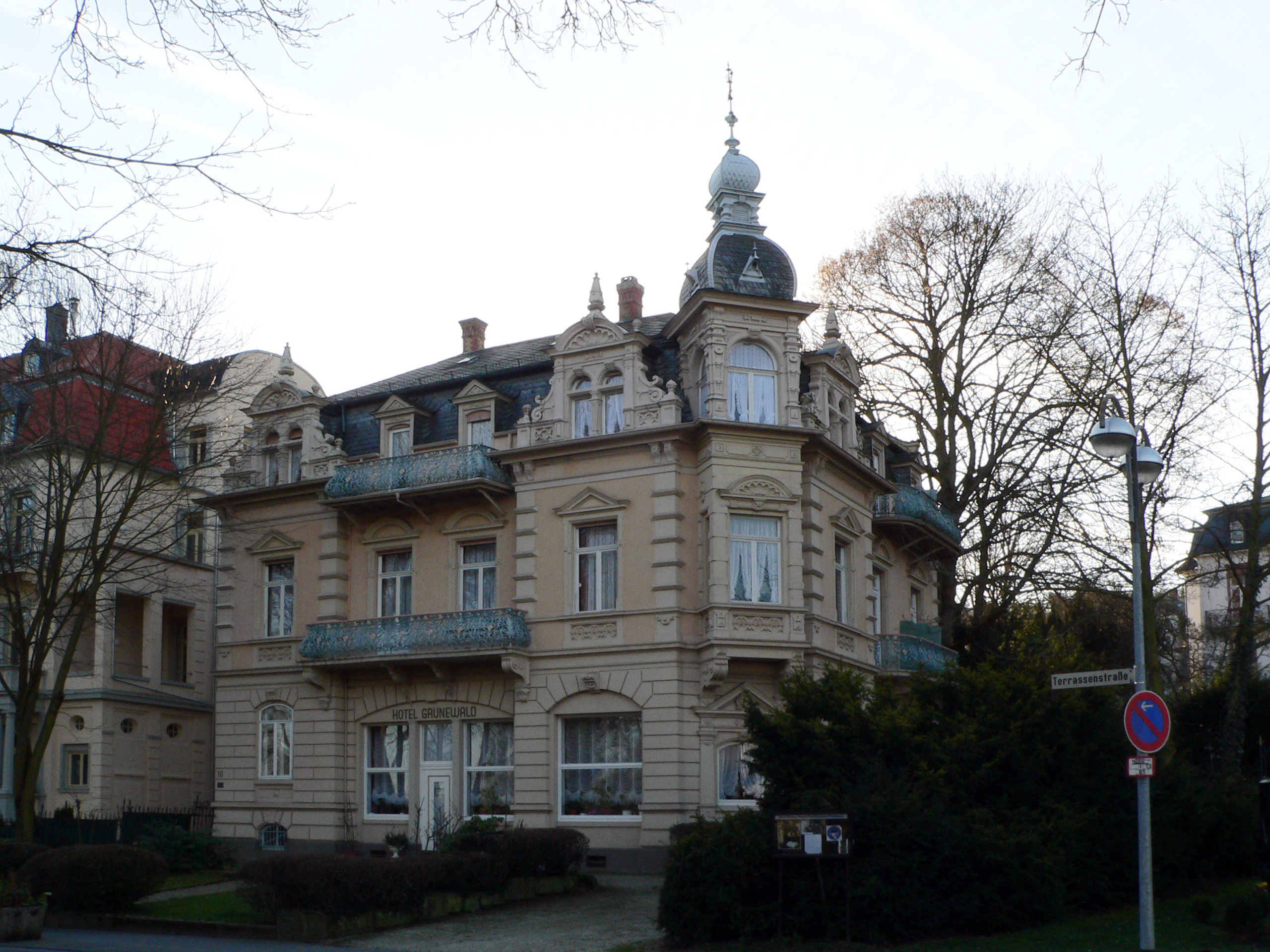
Villa Grunewald, Bad Nauheim

Although Presley's manager had forbidden him from performing while in the army, pressure from RCA for him to record new material led to Parker sending a microphone and a tape recorder to West Germany. Presley had recorded a handful of songs before he left for overseas to cover his time away, but RCA was worried that they would run out of material before March 1960. In a letter to his client, Parker explained that recordings of Presley with just a piano for accompaniment, singing gospel songs would be good enough; his fans would just want to hear him sing anything. Presley used the recorder to mess around with friends and family, singing mainly gospel and current hits, but none of these recordings was sent back for release by RCA. Decades later these recordings would be released officially on titles such as Private Presley and Home Recordings. In June, with 15 days' leave to enjoy, Presley and his friends traveled to Munich and Paris. Two days in Munich were followed by over a week of partying in Paris where, on several occasions, Presley would invite the whole chorus line of girls from The 4 O'Clock club back to his hotel.

Media reports echoed Presley's concerns about his career, but RCA producer Steve Sholes and Freddy Bienstock of Hill and Range had carefully prepared for his two-year hiatus. Armed with a substantial amount of unreleased material, they kept up a regular stream of successful releases. Between his induction and discharge, Presley had ten top 40 hits, including "Wear My Ring Around Your Neck", the best-selling "Hard Headed Woman", and "One Night" in 1958, and "(Now and Then There's) A Fool Such as I" and the number one "A Big Hunk o' Love" in 1959. RCA also managed to generate four albums compiling old material during this period, most successfully Elvis' Golden Records (1958), which hit number three on the LP chart.

Introduced to amphetamines by a sergeant while on maneuvers, he became "practically evangelical about their benefits"—not only for energy, but for "strength" and weight loss, as well—and many of his friends in the outfit joined him in indulging. The army also introduced Presley to karate, which he studied seriously, later including it in his live performances. Fellow soldiers have attested to Presley's wish to be seen as an able, ordinary soldier, despite his fame, and to his generosity while in the service. He donated his army pay to charity, purchased TV sets for the post, and bought an extra set of fatigues for everyone in his outfit.

=== 1959 ===
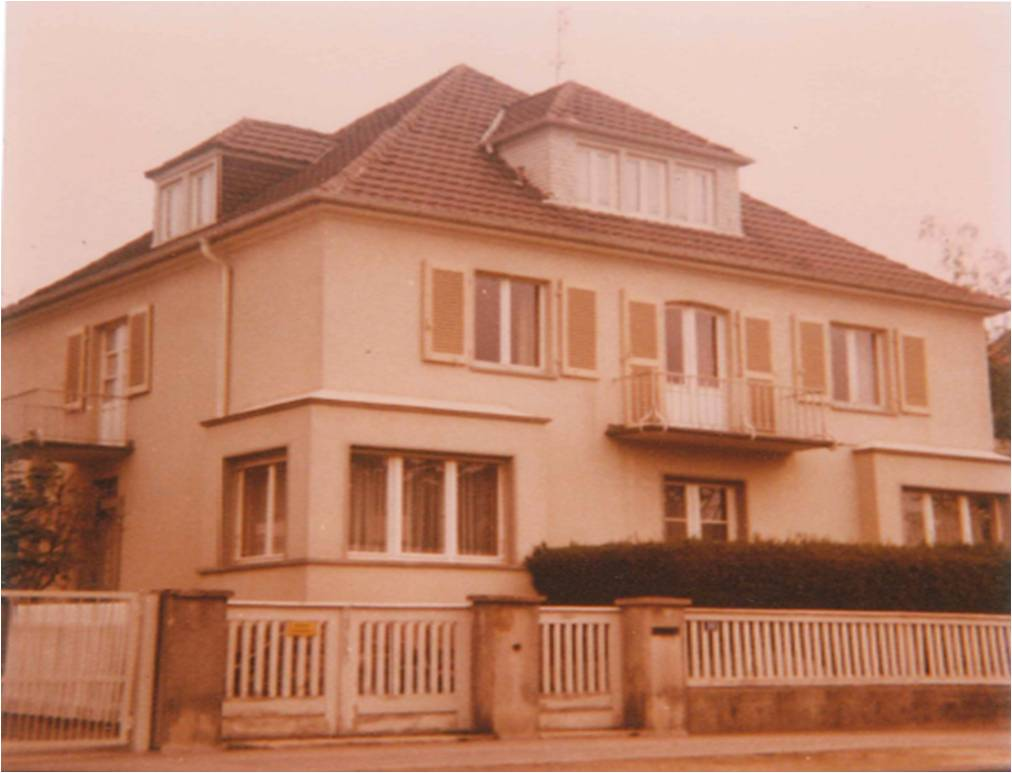
Goethestrasse 14, Bad Nauheim

In early 1959, after a combination of a few complaints from other guests about the behavior of Presley fans wanting to see him at the Grunewald Hotel and the arrival of King Saud of Saudi Arabia, whose rather large entourage demanded the closing of the entire facility so that they could be well taken care of, particularly as his stay there was for medical reasons, Elvis and the group left the hotel and moved to a five-bedroom house nearby, at No. 14 Goethestrasse, soon to become West Germany's most celebrated private address. Fans would congregate outside the house to see Presley as he came and went to work, and a sign was put up stating that autographs would be given between 7:30 and 8 p.m.

=== 1960 ===
On January 20, 1960, Presley was promoted to sergeant. The Army held a press conference on March 1 before Presley departed West Germany for the United States. Presley was asked about his decision to serve as a regular soldier instead of in Special Services. He said, "I was in a funny position. Actually, that's the only way it could be. People were expecting me to mess up, to goof up in one way or another. They thought I couldn't take it and so forth, and I was determined to go to any limits to prove otherwise, not only to the people who were wondering, but to myself".

== Discharge ==
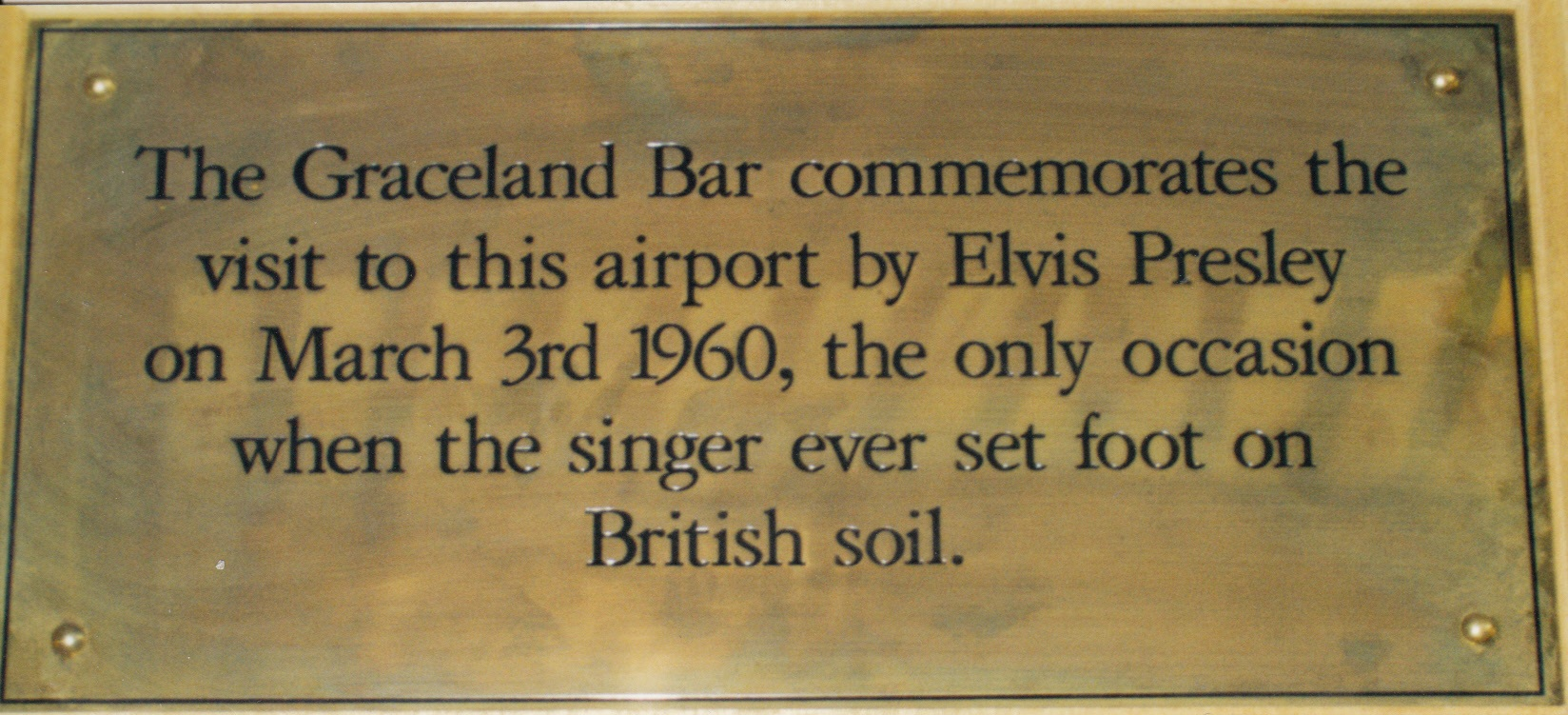
Prestwick Airport plaque recording the only occasion when Presley set foot in the UK

On March 2, with Priscilla in attendance, Presley waved goodbye to the fans and media of West Germany and flew home to the U.S. On the way, his plane stopped at Prestwick Airport in Scotland to refuel; this was the only time that Presley would be in the United Kingdom, although he was never legally in the country having never left the airport.

On March 3, Presley's plane arrived at McGuire Air Force Base near Fort Dix, New Jersey, at 7:42 am. Nancy Sinatra, RCA representatives, and Parker were there to welcome him home, as well as a huge crowd of fans. Two days later, on March 5, Presley was officially discharged from active duty with his service officially notated as honorable.

== Personal life ==
=== Dee Stanley ===
Around this time Presley's father, Vernon, had been getting close to a woman named Dee Stanley, the wife of army sergeant Bill Stanley. Originally Dee had written to Presley inviting him to dinner. She had seen him live during one of his earliest performances in the fifties, and she was keen to meet a star of his stature. Presley, not interested in dinner with someone he knew was considerably older, sent his father in his place. Most biographers state that Dee was already in the process of divorcing her husband when she met Vernon, but some others claim that Vernon had gotten to know both of them together, and was even asked by Bill to help him save his marriage. When Presley heard of the relationship between his father and Dee he flew into a rage; in his mind his father had no business to be setting up with another woman so soon after the death of Gladys. Dee returned to the US in the summer of 1959, closely followed by Vernon, and the pair returned to West Germany together. Close friends of Presley have stated that Bill received a "handsome payoff" for his signature on the divorce papers. Dee and Vernon eventually married in 1960, with her children becoming stepbrothers to Presley. Although Presley never liked Dee, he became very close to her young children and welcomed them to his home as the brothers he never had; in later years they were employed as bodyguards and drivers. Dee Stanley Presley died on September 28, 2013.

=== Priscilla Beaulieu ===
On September 13, 1959, airman Currie Grant, who had met Presley a few months earlier, introduced him to 14-year-old Priscilla Beaulieu (née Wagner) during a party at Presley's home. Witnesses recall that Presley took an instant liking to Beaulieu. Back in the US after the army, Presley would return to his steady girlfriend Anita Wood. Wood left Presley in 1962 after she heard Presley say that he could not choose between her and Beaulieu (who was still living in Germany, but who visited Memphis for two weeks in June 1962 and again in December). Beaulieu's stepfather allowed her to go back to US three months before the rest of the family would return home. She stayed in Presley's father's home and finished the few weeks left before her graduation May 29, 1963. After several years of speculation about a secret marriage, they were married in Las Vegas on May 1, 1967.

== Dates of rank ==
Promotions
Rank	Date
Private (no insignia until 1968)	March 24, 1958
Private First Class	November 27, 1958
Specialist Four	June 1, 1959
Sergeant	February 11, 1960

== Memorials in Germany ==
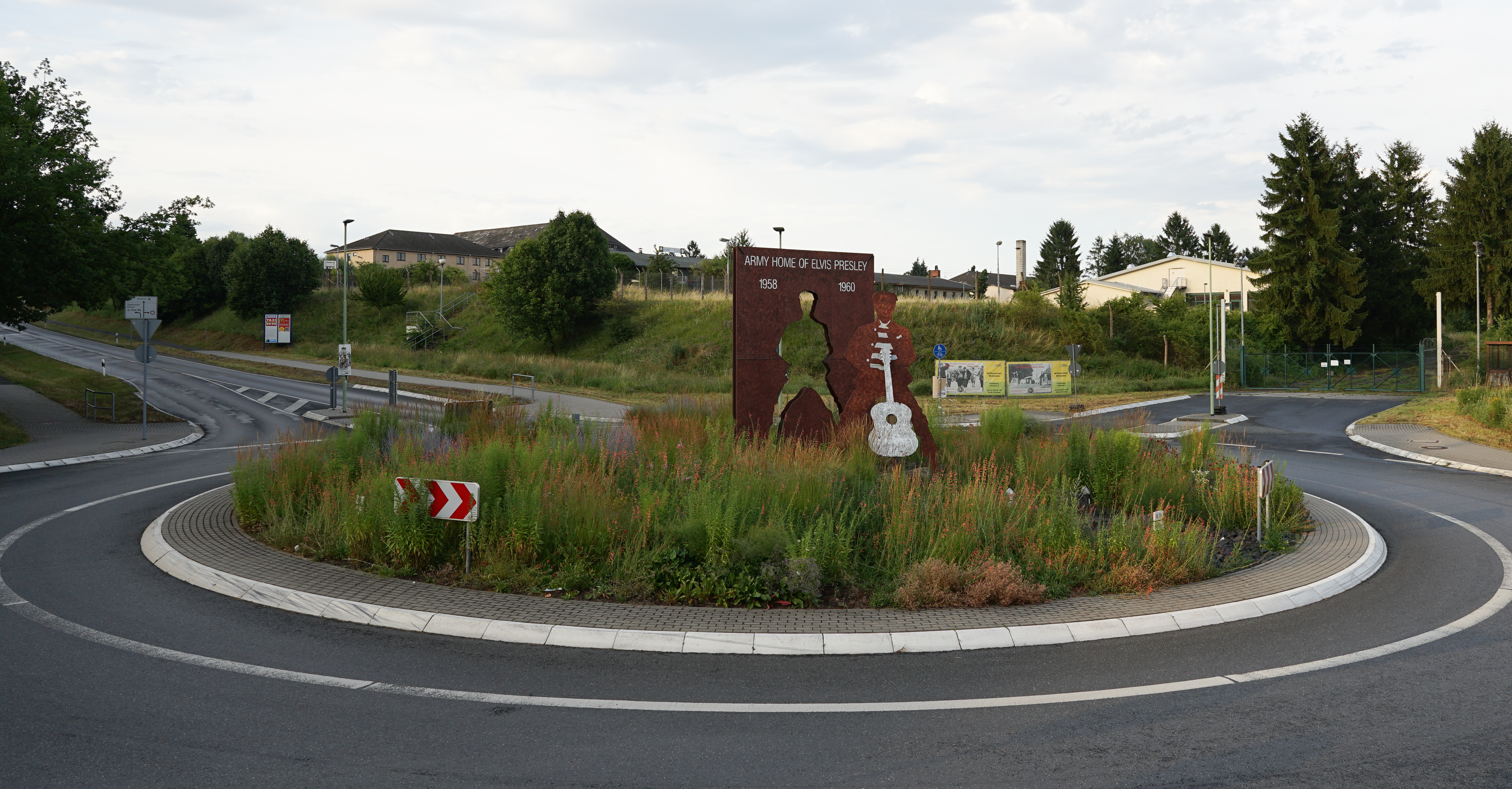
Elvis Presley Circle, Friedberg

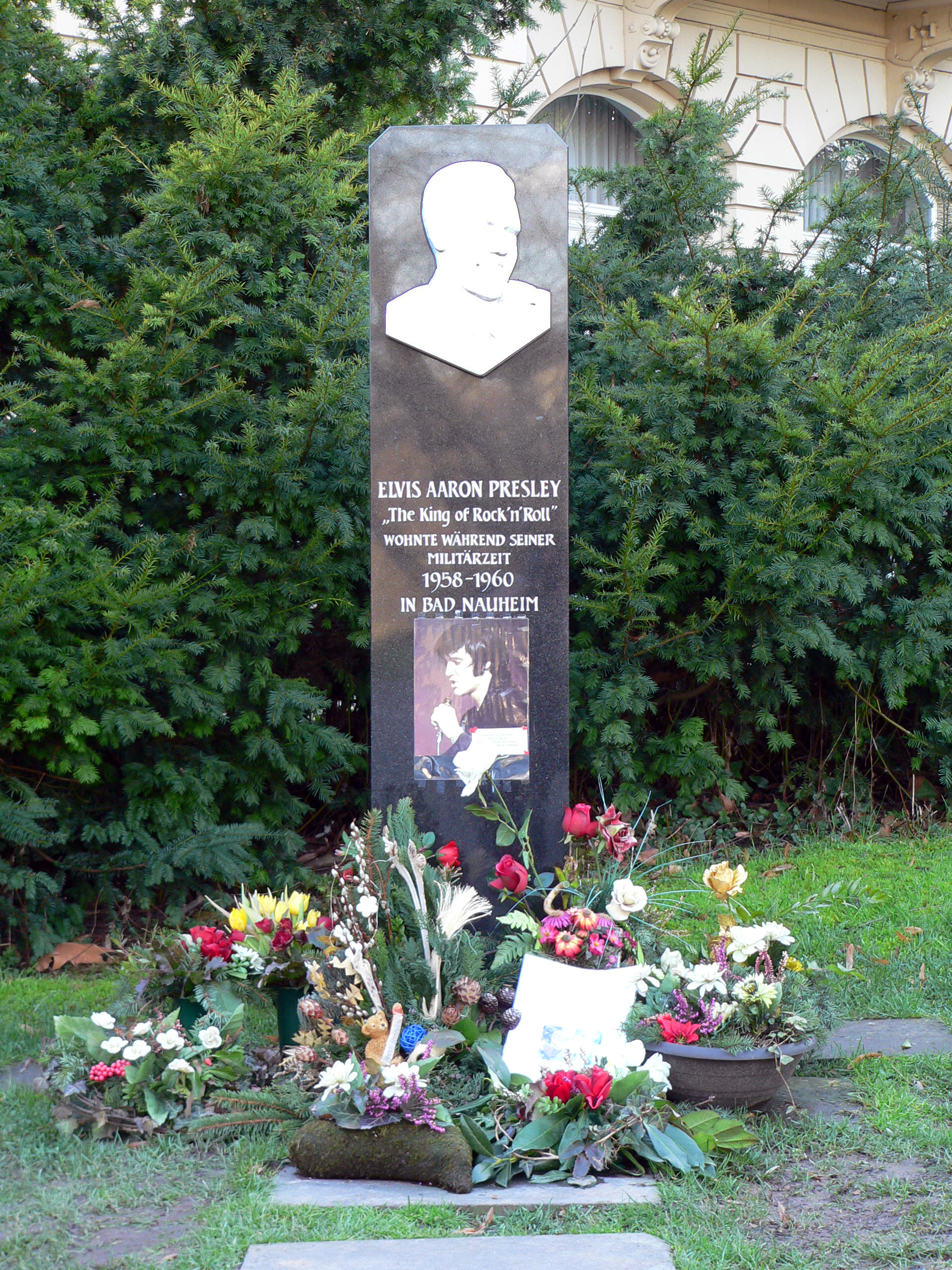
Elvis Presley Memorial, Bad Nauheim

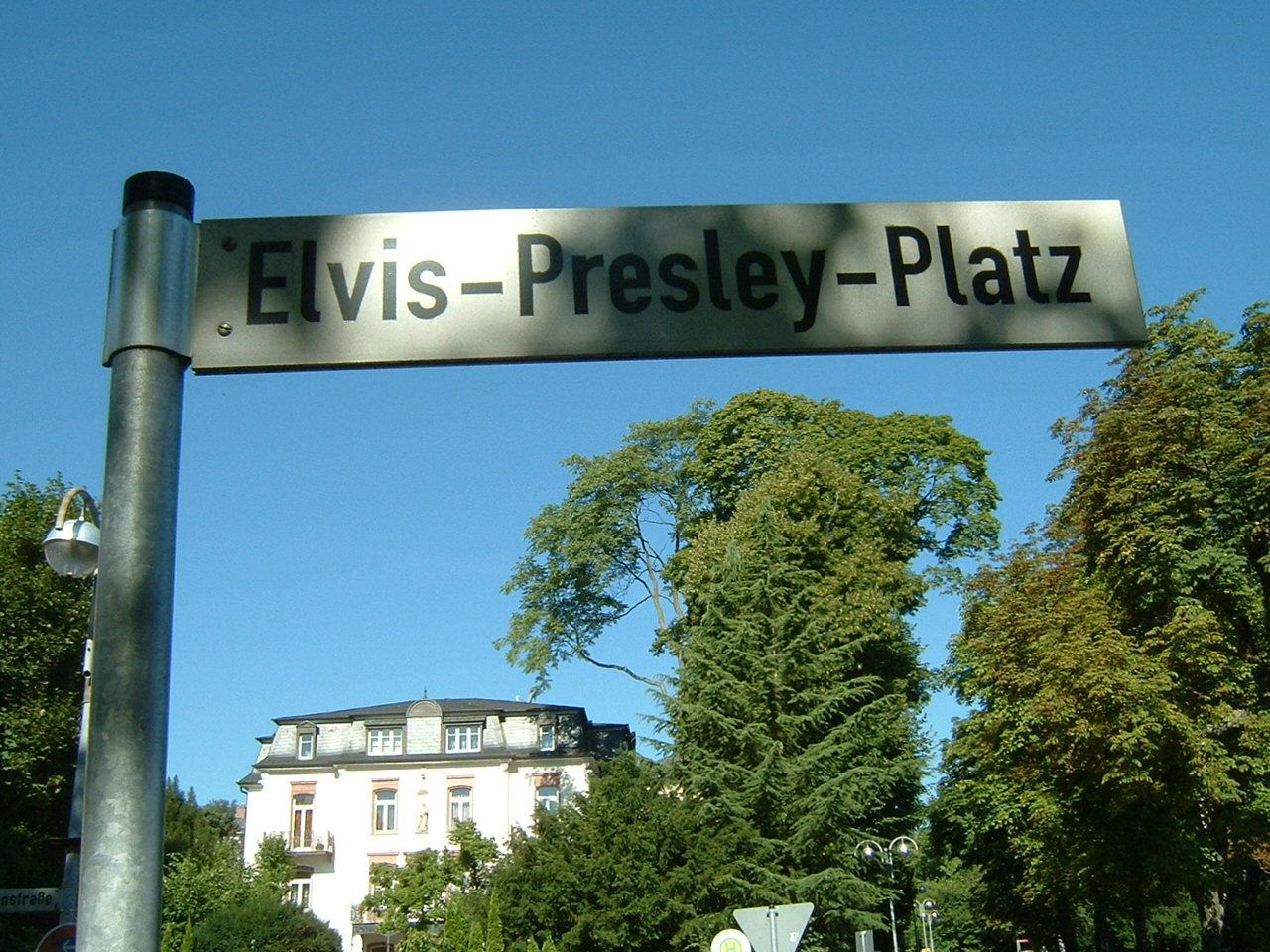
Elvis Presley Square, Bad Nauheim

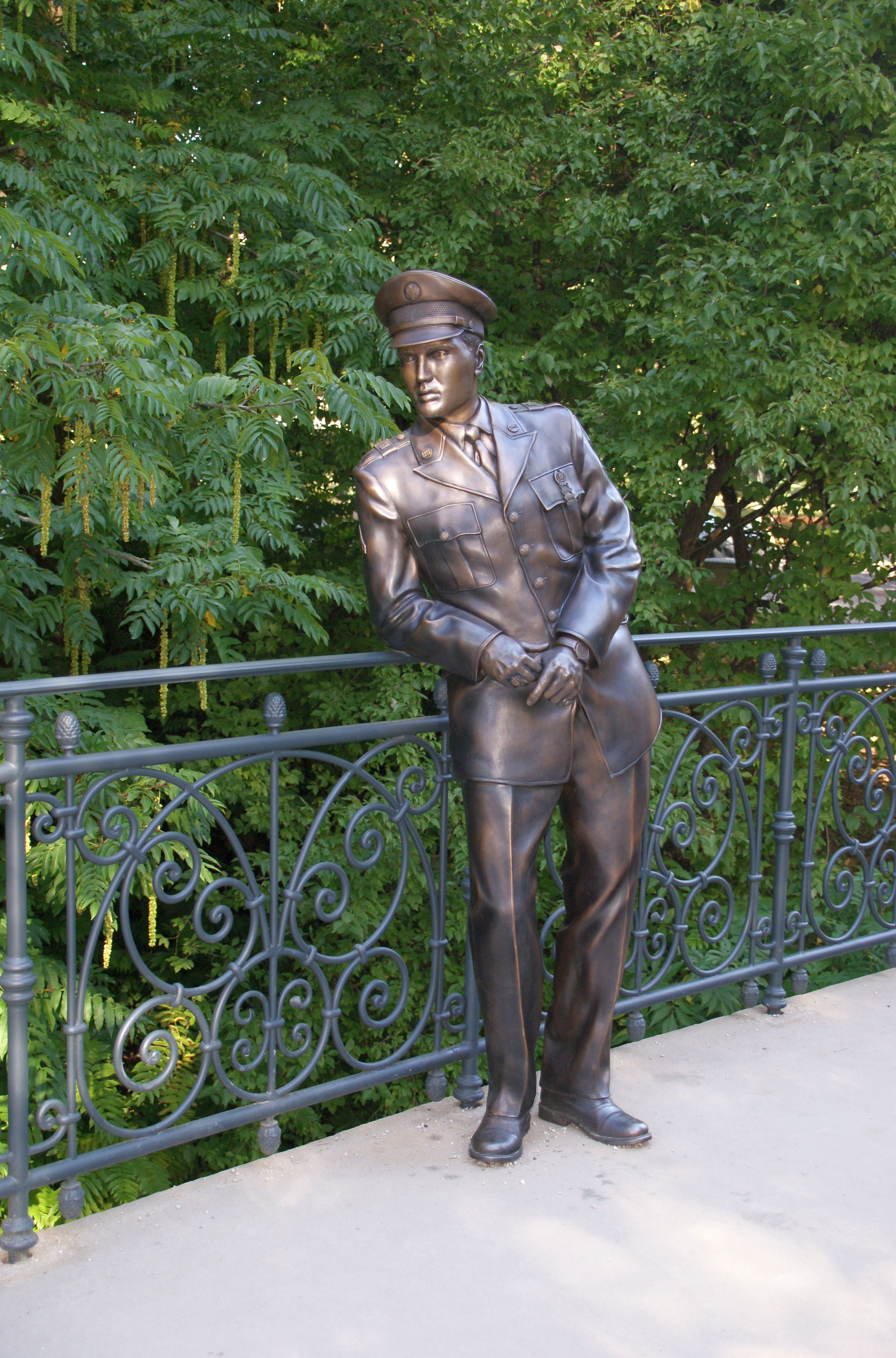
Usa Bridge, Bad Nauheim

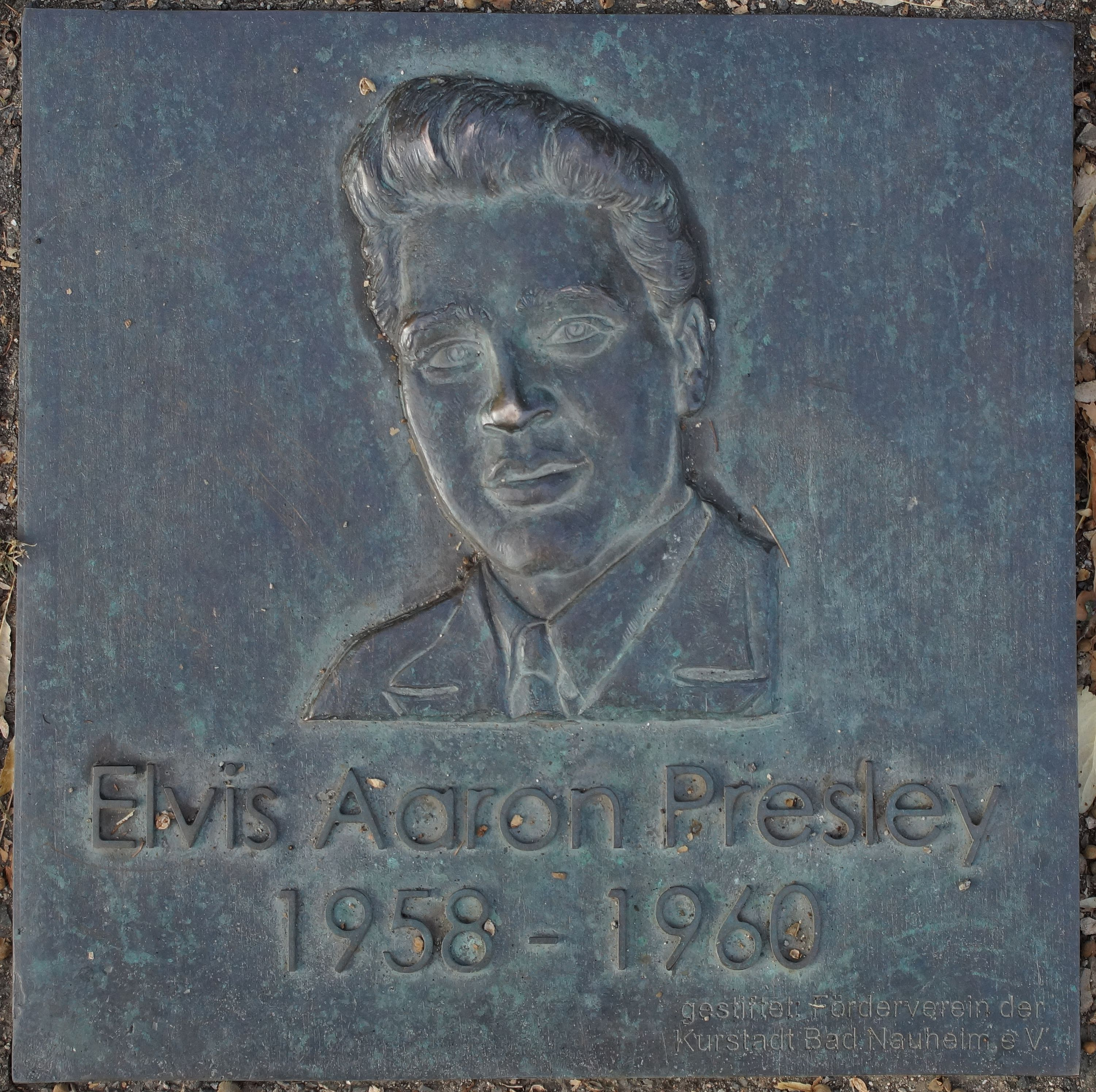
Walk of Fame, Bad Nauheim

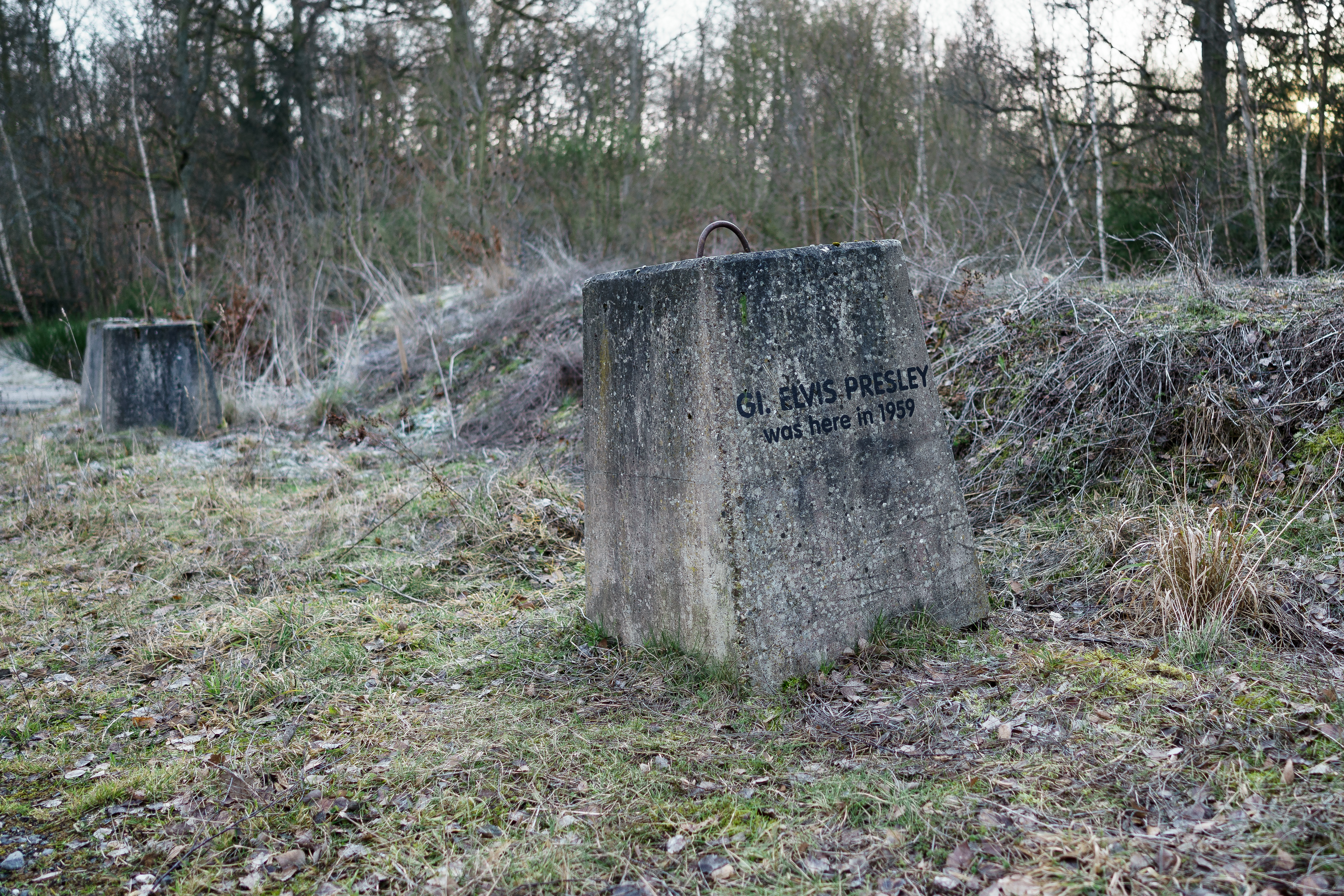
Elvis Presley Memorial, Ober-Mörlen

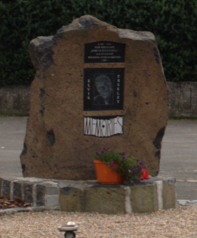
Elvis Presley Memorial, Schlitz
