= Early life of Elvis Presley =

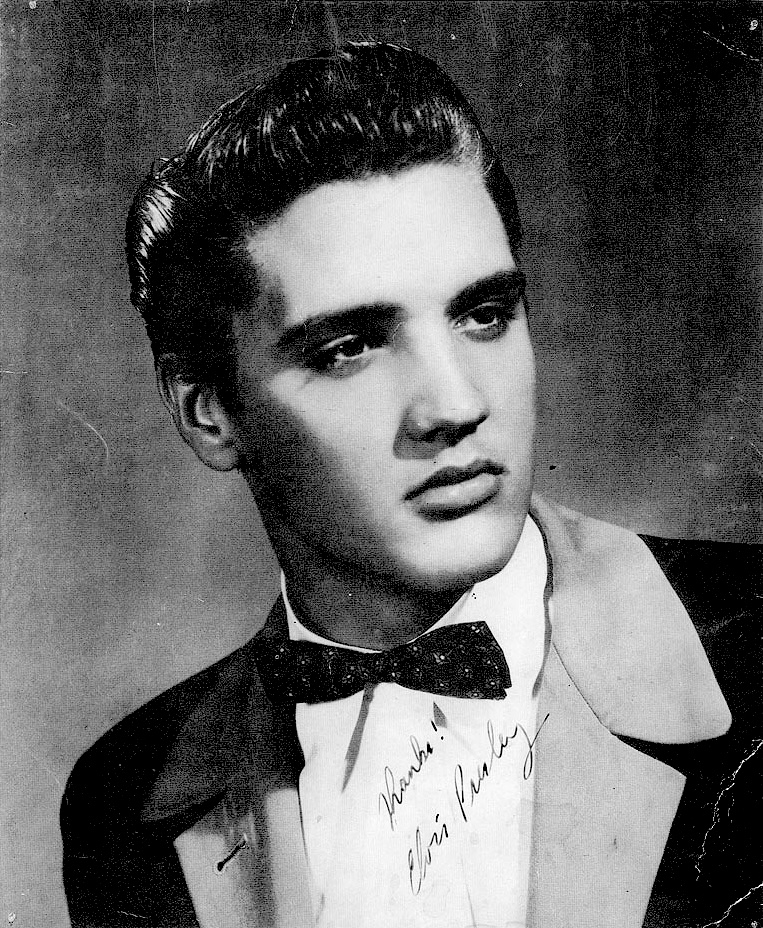
Elvis in a Sun Records promotional photograph, 1954

Elvis Aaron Presley (January 8, 1935 – August 16, 1977), popularly known by his first name Elvis, was an American singer and actor. He was born in Tupelo, Mississippi, and moved to Memphis, Tennessee, with his family at age 13. His music career began there in 1954, recording at Sun Records with producer Sam Phillips, who wanted to bring the sound of African-American music to a wider audience. Presley, on rhythm acoustic guitar, and accompanied by lead guitarist Scotty Moore and bassist Bill Black, was a pioneer of rockabilly, an uptempo, backbeat-driven fusion of country music and rhythm and blues. In 1955, drummer D. J. Fontana joined to complete the lineup of Presley's classic quartet and RCA Victor acquired his contract in a deal arranged by Colonel Tom Parker, who would manage him for more than two decades.

== Childhood in Tupelo ==
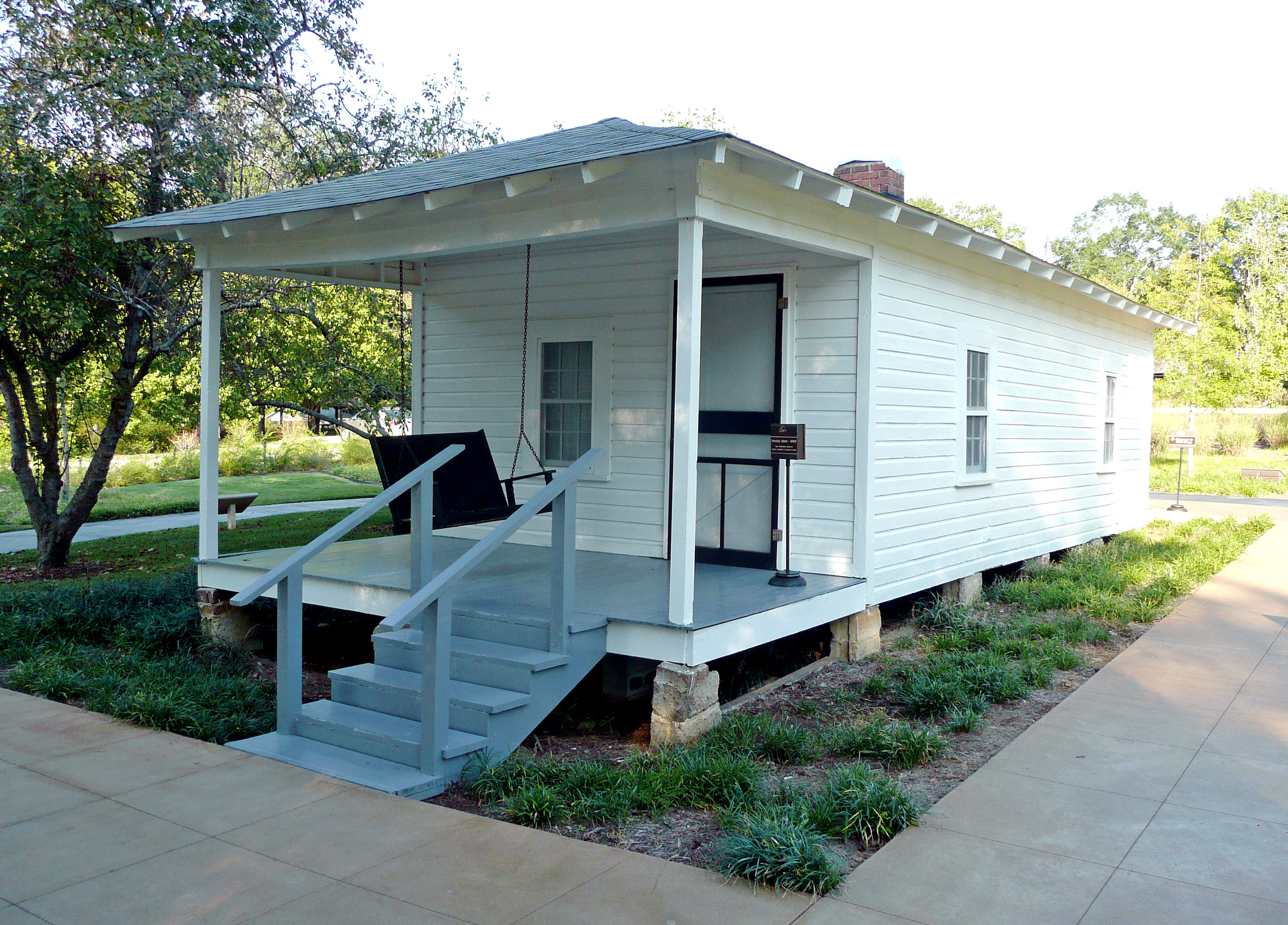
Presley's birthplace in Tupelo, Mississippi

Elvis Aaron Presley was born on January 8, 1935, in Tupelo, Mississippi, to Vernon Presley and Gladys Love (née Smith) Presley in a two-room shotgun house that his father built for the occasion. Elvis's identical twin brother, Jesse Garon Presley, was delivered stillborn thirty-five minutes before him. Elvis became close to both parents and formed an especially close bond with his mother. The family attended an Assembly of God church, where he found his initial musical inspiration.

Presley's father Vernon was of Irish, German, Scottish, and English origins, and was a descendant of the Harrison family of Virginia through his mother, Minnie Mae Presley (née Hood). Presley's mother Gladys was Scots-Irish with some French Norman ancestry. She and the rest of the family believed that her great-great-grandmother, Morning Dove White, was Cherokee. This belief was restated by Elvis's granddaughter Riley Keough in 2017. Elaine Dundy, in her biography, supports the belief, as does Northern Ireland-based historian Alister McReynolds, who stated in his 2014 book Kith and Kin: The Continuing Legacy of the Scots-Irish in America that Morning Dove White was a Cherokee princess who married Presley's Ulster Scot ancestor William Mansell. Dundy also alleged that Elvis' great-great grandmother Nancy J. Burdine (married to Abner Tackett) was Jewish. Burdine's family are believed to have migrated to the United States from what is now Lithuania around the time of the American Revolution; it was revealed that the original headstone for Gladys Presley, which was placed on her first grave at Memphis' Forest Hill Cemetery in December 1964 and had been in storage in the Graceland Archives between 1977 and 2018, had not only a cross marking, but also a Star of David marking on it as well. Nate Bloom challenged the claim of a Jewish ancestor after checking records, and a conversation with a woman whose mother was friends with Gladys. More recently genealogical researcher Carrie Zeidman concluded the claim "doesn’t stand up to the research" after not finding any records connecting a Nancy J. Burdine to the Tackett family.

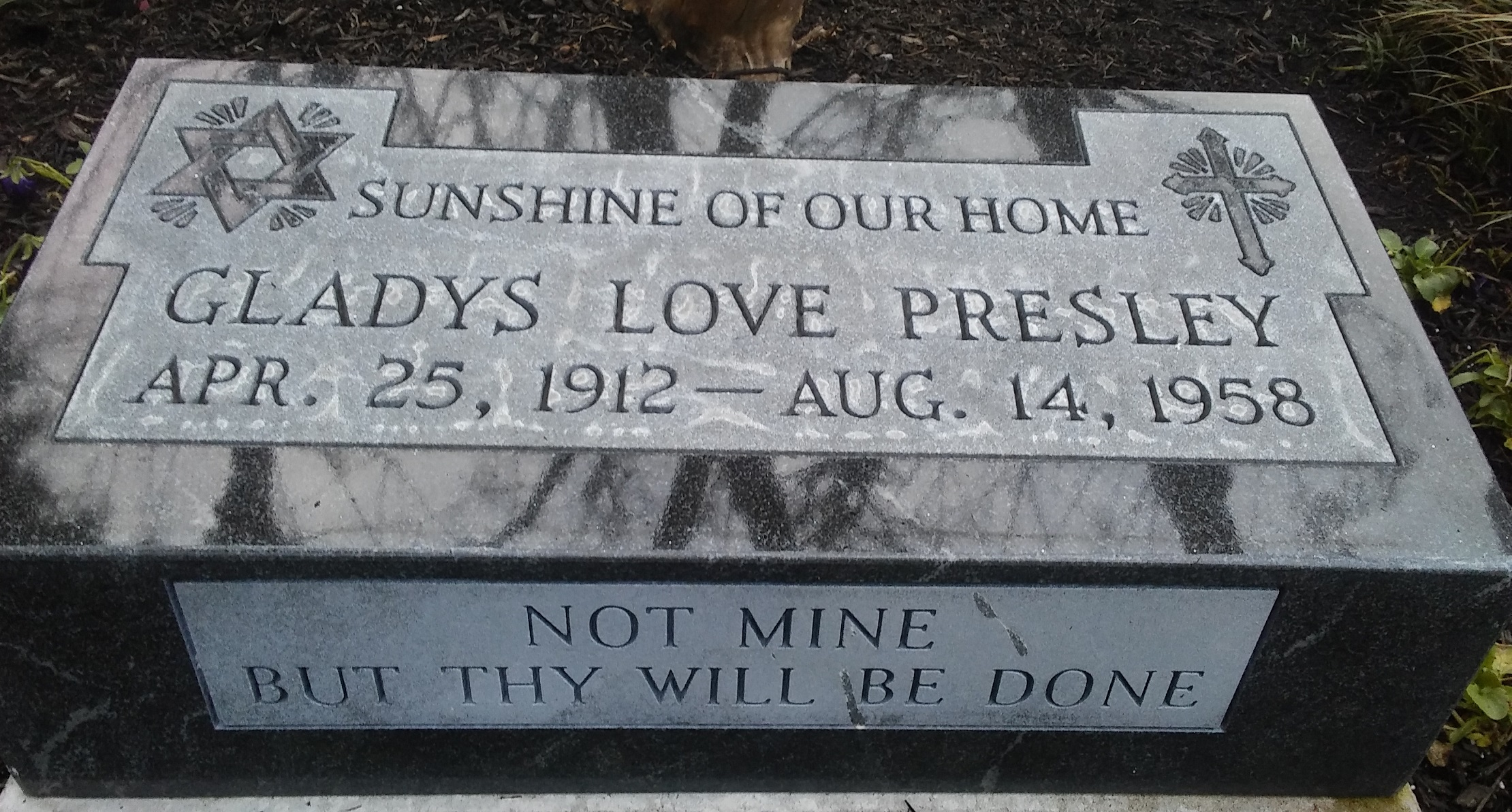
Gladys Presley’s headstone became publicly displayed in Graceland's Meditation Garden in 2018. It is marked with both a cross and a Star of David.

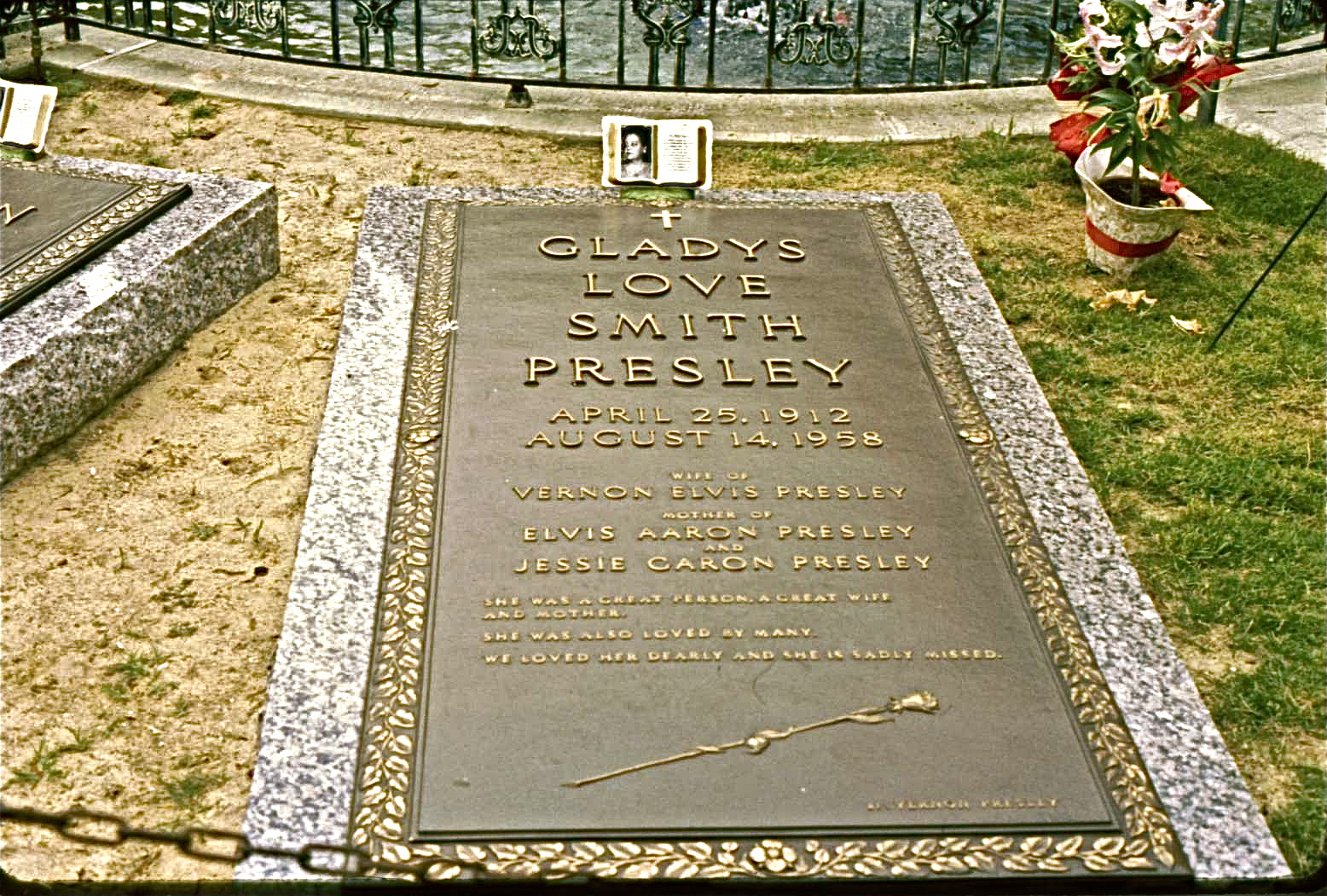
Gladys Presley's grave, in Graceland's Meditation Garden, marked with only a cross

Vernon moved from one odd job to the next, showing little ambition. The family often relied on help from neighbors and government food assistance. In 1938 they lost their home after Vernon was found guilty of altering a check written by his landowner and sometime-employer. He was jailed for eight months while Gladys and Elvis moved in with relatives.

In September 1941, Presley entered first grade at East Tupelo Consolidated, where his teachers regarded him as "average". He was encouraged to enter a singing contest after impressing his schoolteacher with a rendition of Red Foley's country song "Old Shep" during morning prayers. The contest, held at the Mississippi–Alabama Fair and Dairy Show on October 3, 1945, was his first public performance. The ten-year-old Presley stood on a chair to reach the microphone and sang "Old Shep". He recalled placing fifth. A few months later, Presley received his first guitar for his birthday; he had hoped for something else—by different accounts, either a bicycle or a rifle. Over the following year, he received basic guitar lessons from two of his uncles and the new pastor at the family's church. Presley recalled, "I took the guitar, and I watched people, and I learned to play a little bit. But I would never sing in public. I was very shy about it."

In September 1946, Presley entered a new school, Milam, for sixth grade; he was regarded as a loner. The following year, he began bringing his guitar to school on a daily basis. He played and sang during lunchtime and was often teased as a "trashy" kid who played hillbilly music. By then, the family was living in a largely African-American neighborhood. Presley was a devotee of Mississippi Slim's show on the Tupelo radio station WELO. He was described as "crazy about music" by Slim's younger brother, who was one of Presley's classmates and often took him into the station. Slim supplemented Presley's guitar instruction by demonstrating chord techniques. When his protégé was aged 12, Slim scheduled him for two on-air performances. Presley was overcome by stage fright the first time but succeeded in performing the following week.

== Teenage life in Memphis ==
In November 1948, the family moved to Memphis, Tennessee. After residing for nearly a year in rooming houses, they were granted a two-bedroom apartment in the public housing complex known as the Lauderdale Courts. Enrolled at L. C. Humes High School, Presley received only a C in music in eighth grade. When his music teacher told him that he had no aptitude for singing, he brought in his guitar the next day and sang a recent hit, "Keep Them Cold Icy Fingers Off Me", to prove otherwise. A classmate later recalled that the teacher "agreed that Elvis was right when he said that she didn't appreciate his kind of singing". He was usually too shy to perform openly and was occasionally bullied by classmates who viewed him as a "mama's boy".

In 1950, Presley began practicing guitar regularly under the tutelage of Lee Denson, a neighbor two and a half years his senior. They and three other boys—including two future rockabilly pioneers, brothers Dorsey and Johnny Burnette—formed a loose musical collective that played frequently around the Courts. That September, Presley began working as an usher at Loew's State Theater. Other jobs followed at Precision Tool, another stint at Loew's, and MARL Metal Products. Presley also helped Jewish neighbors, the Fruchters, by being their shabbos goy.

During his junior year, Presley began to stand out more among his classmates, largely because of his appearance: he grew his sideburns and styled his hair with rose oil and Vaseline. In his free time, he would head down to Beale Street, the heart of Memphis' thriving blues scene, and gaze longingly at the wild, flashy clothes in the windows of Lansky Brothers. By his senior year, he was wearing those clothes. Overcoming his reticence about performing outside the Courts, he competed in Humes' Annual "Minstrel" Show in April 1953. Singing and playing guitar, he opened with "Till I Waltz Again with You", a recent hit for Teresa Brewer. Presley recalled that the performance did much for his reputation: "I wasn't popular in school ... I failed music—only thing I ever failed. And then they entered me in this talent show ... when I came onstage, I heard people kind of rumbling and whispering and so forth, 'cause nobody knew I even sang. It was amazing how popular I became in school after that."

Presley, who received no formal music training and could not read music, studied and played by ear. He also visited record stores that provided jukeboxes and listening booths to customers. He knew all of Hank Snow's songs, and he loved records by other country singers such as Roy Acuff, Ernest Tubb, Ted Daffan, Jimmie Rodgers, Jimmie Davis, and Bob Wills. The Southern gospel singer Jake Hess, one of his favorite performers, was a significant influence on his ballad-singing style. Presley was a regular audience member at the monthly All-Night Singings downtown, where many of the white gospel groups that performed reflected the influence of African American spiritual music. He adored the music of black gospel singer Sister Rosetta Tharpe.

Presley listened to regional radio stations, such as WDIA, that played what were then called "race records": spirituals, blues, and the modern, backbeat-heavy sound of rhythm and blues. Like some of his peers, he may have attended blues venues only on nights designated for exclusively white audiences—a necessity in the segregated South. Many of his future recordings were inspired by local African-American musicians such as Arthur Crudup and Rufus Thomas. B.B. King recalled that he had known Presley before he was popular when they both used to frequent Beale Street. By the time he graduated from high school in June 1953, Presley had already singled out music as his future.

== Sam Phillips and Sun Records ==
In August 1953, Presley checked into the offices of Memphis Recording Service, the company run by Sam Phillips before he started Sun Records. He aimed to pay for a few minutes of studio time to record a two-sided acetate disc: "My Happiness" and "That's When Your Heartaches Begin". He later claimed that he intended the record as a birthday gift for his mother, or that he was merely interested in what he "sounded like", although there was a much cheaper, amateur record-making service at a nearby general store. Biographer Peter Guralnick argued that Presley chose Sun in the hope of being discovered. Asked by receptionist Marion Keisker what kind of singer he was, Presley responded, "I sing all kinds." When she pressed him on who he sounded like, he repeatedly answered, "I don't sound like nobody." After he recorded, Keisker wrote down the young man's name for Phillips, who was out of the office, along with her own commentary: "Good ballad singer. Hold."

In January 1954, Presley cut a second acetate at Sun—"I'll Never Stand in Your Way" and "It Wouldn't Be the Same Without You"—but again nothing came of it. Not long after, he failed an audition for a local vocal quartet, the Songfellows, explaining to his father, "They told me I couldn't sing." Songfellow Jim Hamill later claimed that he was turned down because he did not demonstrate an ear for harmony at the time. In April, Presley began working for the Crown Electric company as a truck driver. His friend Ronnie Smith, after playing a few local gigs with him, suggested he contact Eddie Bond, leader of Smith's professional band, which had an opening for a vocalist. Bond rejected him after a tryout, advising Presley to stick to truck driving "because you're never going to make it as a singer".

Phillips, meanwhile, was always on the lookout for someone who could bring to a broader audience the sound of the black musicians on whom Sun focused. As Keisker reported, "Over and over I remember Sam saying, 'If I could find a white man who had the Negro sound and the Negro feel, I could make a billion dollars.'" In June, he acquired a demo recording by Jimmy Sweeney of a ballad, "Without You", that he thought might suit Presley. The teenaged singer came by the studio but was unable to do it justice. Despite this, Phillips asked Presley to sing as many numbers as he knew. He was sufficiently affected by what he heard to invite two local musicians, guitarist Winfield "Scotty" Moore and upright bass player Bill Black, to work something up with Presley for a recording session.

The session, held the evening of July 5, proved entirely unfruitful until late in the night. As they were about to abort and go home, Presley took his guitar and launched into a 1946 blues number, Arthur Crudup's "That's All Right". Moore recalled, "All of a sudden, Elvis just started singing this song, jumping around and acting the fool, and then Bill picked up his bass, and he started acting the fool, too, and I started playing with them. Sam, I think, had the door to the control booth open ... he stuck his head out and said, 'What are you doing?' And we said, 'We don't know.' 'Well, back up,' he said, 'try to find a place to start, and do it again.'" Phillips quickly began taping; this was the sound he had been looking for.

Three days later, popular Memphis disc jockey Dewey Phillips (no relation to Sam Phillips) played "That's All Right" on his Red, Hot, and Blue show. Listeners began phoning in, eager to find out who the singer was. The interest was such that Phillips played the record repeatedly during the remaining two hours of his show. Interviewing Presley on-air, Phillips asked him what high school he attended to clarify his color for the many callers who had assumed that he was black. During the next few days, the trio recorded a bluegrass song, Bill Monroe's "Blue Moon of Kentucky", again in a distinctive style and employing a jury-rigged echo effect that Sam Phillips dubbed "slapback". A single was pressed with "That's All Right" on the A-side and "Blue Moon of Kentucky" on the reverse.

== Early live performances and RCA Victor contract ==
The trio played publicly for the first time at the Bon Air club on July 17, 1954—Presley still sporting his child-size guitar. At the end of the month, they appeared at the Overton Park Shell, with Slim Whitman headlining. Here Elvis pioneered 'Rubber Legs', his signature style dance movement that he is best known for. A combination of his strong response to rhythm and nervousness at playing before a large crowd led Presley to shake his legs as he performed: his wide-cut pants emphasized his movements, causing young women in the audience to start screaming. Moore recalled, "During the instrumental parts, he would back off from the mike and be playing and shaking, and the crowd would just go wild". Black, a natural showman, whooped and rode his bass, hitting double licks that Presley would later remember as "really a wild sound, like a jungle drum or something".

Soon after, Moore and Black left their old band, the Starlite Wranglers, to play with Presley regularly, and disc jockey/promoter Bob Neal became the trio's manager. From August through October, they played frequently at the Eagle's Nest club, a dance venue on the second floor of the Clearpool recreation complex in Memphis. When Presley played his fifteen-minute sets, teenagers rushed from the pool to fill the club, then left again as the house western swing band resumed. Presley quickly grew more confident on stage. According to Moore, "His movement was a natural thing, but he was also very conscious of what got a reaction. He'd do something one time and then he would expand on it real quick." Amid these live performances, Presley returned to Sun studio for more recording sessions. Presley made what would be his only appearance on Nashville's Grand Ole Opry on October 2; after a polite audience response, Opry manager Jim Denny told Phillips that his singer was "not bad" but did not suit the program.

== Louisiana Hayride, radio commercial, and first television performances ==
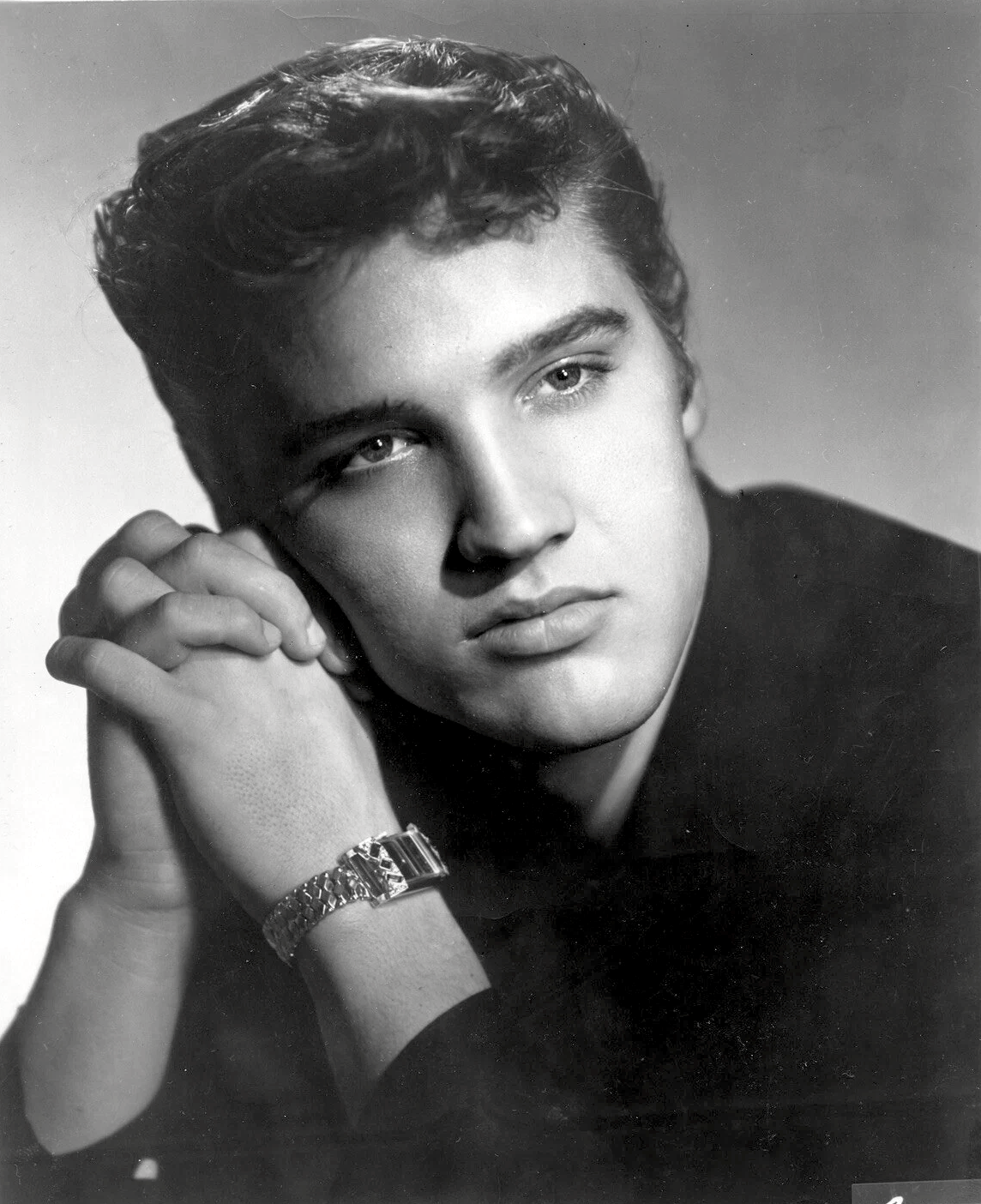
Presley in a 1955 Sun Records promotional portrait

In November 1954, Presley performed on Louisiana Hayride—the Opry's chief, and more adventurous, rival. The Shreveport-based show was broadcast to 198 radio stations in 28 states. Presley had another attack of nerves during the first set, which drew a muted reaction. A more composed and energetic second set inspired an enthusiastic response. House drummer D. J. Fontana brought a new element, complementing Presley's movements with accented beats that he had mastered playing in strip clubs. Soon after the show, the Hayride engaged Presley for a year's worth of Saturday-night appearances. Trading in his old guitar for $8 (and seeing it promptly dispatched to the garbage), he purchased a Martin instrument for $175 (equivalent to $2,100 in 2025) and his trio began playing in new locales, including Houston, Texas, and Texarkana, Arkansas.

Many fledgling performers, like Minnie Pearl, Johnny Horton, and Johnny Cash, sang the praises of Louisiana Hayride sponsor Southern Maid Donuts, including Presley, who developed a lifelong love of donuts. Presley made his singular product endorsement commercial for the donut company, which was never released, recording a radio jingle "in exchange for a box of hot glazed doughnuts". Presley made his first television appearance on the KSLA-TV television broadcast of Louisiana Hayride. Soon after, he failed an audition for Arthur Godfrey's Talent Scouts on the CBS television network. By early 1955, Presley's regular Hayride appearances, constant touring, and well-received record releases had made him a regional star, from Tennessee to West Texas.

In January, Neal signed a formal management contract with Presley and brought him to the attention of Colonel Tom Parker, whom he considered the best promoter in the music business. Parker, born in the Netherlands, had immigrated illegally to the U.S. and claimed to be from West Virginia; he had acquired an honorary colonel's commission from the Louisiana governor and country singer Jimmie Davis. Having successfully managed the top country star Eddy Arnold, Parker was working with the new number-one country singer, Hank Snow. Parker booked Presley on Snow's February tour. When the tour reached Odessa, Texas, a 19-year-old Roy Orbison saw Presley for the first time: "His energy was incredible, his instinct was just amazing. ... I just didn't know what to make of it. There was just no reference point in the culture to compare it."

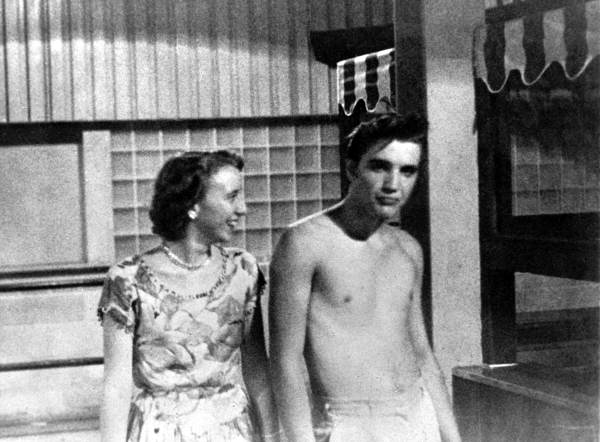
Presley stripped to his waist after escaping from a fan riot, during the concerts performed in Jacksonville, Florida, May 12–13, 1955

By August, Sun had released ten sides credited to "Elvis Presley, Scotty and Bill"; on the latest recordings, the trio were joined by a drummer. Some of the songs, like "That's All Right", were in what one Memphis journalist described as the "R&B idiom of negro field jazz"; others, like "Blue Moon of Kentucky", were "more in the country field", "but there was a curious blending of the two different musics in both". This blend of styles made it difficult for Presley's music to find radio airplay. According to Neal, many country-music disc jockeys would not play it because Presley sounded too much like a black artist and none of the R&B stations would touch him because "he sounded too much like a hillbilly." The blend came to be known as "rockabilly". At the time, Presley was variously billed as "The King of Western Bop", "The Hillbilly Cat", and "The Memphis Flash".

Presley renewed Neal's management contract in August 1955, simultaneously appointing Parker as his special adviser. The group maintained an extensive touring schedule throughout the second half of the year. Neal recalled, "It was almost frightening, the reaction that came to Elvis from the teenaged boys. So many of them, through some sort of jealousy, would practically hate him. There were occasions in some towns in Texas when we'd have to be sure to have a police guard because somebody'd always try to take a crack at him. They'd get a gang and try to waylay him or something." The trio became a quartet when Hayride drummer Fontana joined as a full member. In mid-October, they played a few shows in support of Bill Haley, whose "Rock Around the Clock" track had been a number-one hit the previous year. Haley observed that Presley had a natural feel for rhythm, and advised him to sing fewer ballads.

At the Country Disc Jockey Convention in early November, Presley was voted the year's most promising male artist. Several record companies had by now shown interest in signing him. After three major labels made offers of up to $25,000, Parker and Phillips struck a deal with RCA Victor on November 21 to acquire Presley's Sun contract for an unprecedented $40,000. (Note: Of the $40,000, $5,000 covered back royalties owed by Sun.) Presley, now aged 20, was legally still a minor, so his father signed the contract. Parker arranged with the owners of Hill & Range Publishing, Jean and Julian Aberbach, to create two entities, Elvis Presley Music and Gladys Music, to handle all the new material recorded by Presley. Songwriters were obliged to forgo one-third of their customary royalties in exchange for having Presley perform their compositions. (Note: In 1956–57, Presley was also credited as a co-writer on several songs where he had no hand in the writing process: "Heartbreak Hotel"; "Don't Be Cruel"; all four songs from his first film, including the title track, "Love Me Tender"; "Paralyzed"; and "All Shook Up". (Parker, however, failed to register Presley with such musical licensing firms as ASCAP and its rival BMI, which eventually denied Presley annuity from songwriter's royalties.) Presley received credit on two other songs to which he did contribute: he provided the title for "That's Someone You Never Forget" (1961), written by his friend and former Humes schoolmate Red West; they collaborated with another friend, guitarist Charlie Hodge, on "You'll Be Gone" (1962).) By December, RCA had begun to heavily promote its new singer, and before month's end had reissued many of his Sun recordings.

== Sources ==
- Beifuss, John (August 15, 2018). "Gladys Presley's Elvis-designed tombstone returns to Graceland". Commercial Appeal.
- Bertrand, Michael T (2000). Race, Rock, and Elvis. University of Illinois Press. ISBN 978-0-252-02586-0.
- Blazeski, Goran (April 23, 2017). "Elvis Presley performed in a TV commercial in exchange for a box of hot glazed doughnuts". The Vintage News.
- Burke, Ken; Griffin, Dan (2006). The Blue Moon Boys: The Story of Elvis Presley's Band. Chicago Review Press. ISBN 978-1-55652-614-5.
- Cusic, Don (Summer 1988). "Singing with the King". Rejoice! The Gospel Music Magazine.
- Dundy, Elaine (2004). Elvis and Gladys (2nd ed.). University Press of Mississippi. ISBN 978-1-57806-634-6.
- Earl, Jennifer (February 14, 2017). "19 celebrities you didn't know were twins (Elvis and Jesse Presley)". CBS News.
- Escott, Colin (1998). "Elvis Presley". In Kingsbury, Paul (ed.). The Encyclopedia of Country Music. Oxford University Press. ISBN 978-0-19-517608-7.
- Everet, Todd (August 17, 1977). "Elvis Presley, 42, Found Dead in His Memphis Mansion". Variety.
- Fellner, Dan (June 24, 2021a). "Elvis Presley was Jewish? A grave marker confirms it after four decades". Jewish Telegraph Agency.
- Fellner, Dan (June 25, 2021b). "Display of mother's Star of David headstone revives talk of Elvis's Jewish roots". The Times of Israel.
- Graceland (August 14, 2018). "Gladys Presley's Headstone Added to Meditation Garden". Graceland.
- Guralnick, Peter (1994). Last Train to Memphis: The Rise of Elvis Presley. Little, Brown. ISBN 978-0-316-33225-5.
- Guralnick, Peter (January 8, 2004). "How Did Elvis Get Turned into a Racist?". The New York Times.
- Guralnick, Peter; Jorgensen, Ernst (1999). Elvis Day by Day: The Definitive Record of His Life and Music. Ballantine. ISBN 978-0-345-42089-3.
- Hopkins, Jerry (2007). Elvis – The Biography. Plexus. ISBN 978-0-85965-391-6.
- Jorgensen, Ernst (1998). Elvis Presley – A Life in Music: The Complete Recording Sessions. St Martin's Press. ISBN 978-0-312-18572-5.
- Kamphoefner, Walter D. (2010). "Elvis and Other Germans: Some Reflections and Modest Proposals on the Study of German-American Ethnicity (2009)". In Kluge, Cora Lee (ed.). Paths Crossing: Essays in German-American Studies. Peter Lang. ISBN 978-3-0343-0221-0.
- Keogh, Pamela Clarke (2008). Elvis Presley: The Man, The Life, The Legend. Simon & Schuster. ISBN 978-1-4391-0815-4.
- Keough, Riley [@rileykeough] (July 19, 2017). "I had one great grandma who was creek and one who was full blood Cherokee" (Tweet) – via Twitter.
- Marcus, Greil (1982). Mystery Train: Images of America in Rock 'n' Roll Music (Revised ed.). E.P. Dutton. ISBN 978-0-525-47708-2.
- Mason, Bobbie Ann (2007). Elvis Presley. Penguin. ISBN 978-0-14-303889-4.
- Matthew-Walker, Robert (1979). Elvis Presley. A Study in Music. Midas Books. ISBN 978-0-85936-162-0.
- Miller, James (2000). Flowers in the Dustbin: The Rise of Rock and Roll, 1947–1977. Fireside. ISBN 978-0-684-86560-7.
- Miller, Madison (March 23, 2021). "Elvis Presley: How the King of Rock 'n' Roll Developed His Signature Dance Moves". Outsider. Archived from the original on February 14, 2022.
- Nash, Alanna (2003). The Colonel: The Extraordinary Story of Colonel Tom Parker and Elvis Presley. Simon & Schuster. ISBN 978-0-7432-1301-1.
- Nash, Alanna (2005). Elvis and the Memphis Mafia. Aurum. ISBN 978-1-84513-128-9.
- Parsons, Michael (April 16, 2016). "Elvis Presley's Irish roots proven by legal document". Irish Times.
- Poché, Dixie (2017). Louisiana Sweets: King Cakes, Bread Pudding & Sweet Dough Pie. Arcadia Publishing. ISBN 978-1-4396-6217-5.
- Ponce de Leon, Charles L. (2007). Fortunate Son: The Life of Elvis Presley. Macmillan. ISBN 978-0-8090-1641-9.
- Rodman, G.B. (2013). Elvis After Elvis The Posthumous Career of a Living Legend. Taylor & Francis. ISBN 9781136155062.
- Rogers, Dave (1982). Rock 'n' Roll. Routledge & Kegan Paul. ISBN 978-0-7100-0938-8.
- Stanley, David; Coffey, Frank (1998). The Elvis Encyclopedia. Virgin Books. ISBN 978-0-7535-0293-8.
- Szatmary, David (1996). A Time to Rock: A Social History of Rock 'n' Roll. Schirmer Books. ISBN 978-0-02-864670-1.
- Victor, Adam (2008). The Elvis Encyclopedia. Overlook Duckworth. ISBN 978-1-58567-598-2.
- Wadey, Paul (January 8, 2004). "Jake Hess". The Independent. Archived from the original on July 13, 2010.
- White, Francine (June 23, 2022). "Uh huh, Elvis was a nice Jewish boy". The Jewish Chronicle.
