= Arthur Migliazza =

Jazz musician (b. 1980)

- Born: 1980 (age 45–46); Hyattsville, Maryland
- Genres: Jazz, blues, ragtime, boogie woogie
- Occupation: Musician
- Instrument: Piano
- Years active: 1993–present
- Website: arthurmigliazza.com

Arthur Migliazza (born 1980) is an American blues and boogie woogie pianist.

== Early life and education ==
Arthur Migliazza began studying classical piano at age nine in Washington, D.C., but soon switched to playing blues at age 10 when exposed to it by his teacher. At age 11, Migliazza moved to Tucson, Arizona, with his family and played his first professional show at age 13 at the Tucson Blues Festival, opening for Little Milton.

Migliazza's most notable teachers growing up were Judy Luis-Watson, Ann Rabson, Mark Braun and Henry Butler. Many of his interactions with these teachers were not on a regular basis, but rather by correspondence. From 1991 to 2001, Migliazza also attended Augusta Blues Week in Elkins, West Virginia, for one week every summer. It was there that he befriended and learned from other blues musicians such as Cephas & Wiggins, John Jackson, Steve James, Del Rey, and Saffire – The Uppity Blues Women.

Throughout junior high and high school, Migliazza worked as a solo musician and as part of a piano and drums duo called The Blues Kats, mostly performing at Tucson social events and retirement homes. In 1996 the duo released its first and only album, Funja, and in 1997 the duo was a runner-up in the Tucson Area Music Awards for best blues act.

After graduating, Migliazza moved to Hiroshima, Japan to teach English for a year under the JET Programme.

== Teaching ==
Migliazza began teaching private piano lessons at age 15 and has also appeared on the faculty at Augusta Blues Week in Elkins, West Virginia, and Centrum Blues Week in Port Townsend, Washington, many times since 2001. In 2015, Hal Leonard published Migliazza's signature "8-Lick" teaching method in a book called How to Play Boogie Woogie Piano. The success of this book prompted Migliazza to author an article for wikihow also called How To Play Boogie Woogie Piano and start the first online school for boogie woogie piano instruction called School of Boogie.

== Solo performances and bands ==
Migliazza is most known for his solo performances, which blend virtuoso piano playing with historic storytelling and anecdotes. He continues to perform around the US and internationally as a solo act.

His first band was the Blues Kats, formed in 1994 in Tucson, Arizona, with drummer Joe Martinez and they released an album in 1997 called Funja.

From 2007 to 2011, Migliazza produced an annual dueling boogie woogie piano event in Tucson, called The Booginator with Eric-Jan Overbeek (aka Mr. Boogie Woogie).

In 2011, Migliazza teamed up with former Chuck Berry piano player Bob Baldori, to perform Baldori's original stage play about the history of Boogie Woogie music called Boogie Stomp!. This led to the release of an album together, Disturbing the Peace in 2018 under the name 'The Boogie Kings'. The duo enjoyed many US and international tours, including two sold-out tours of Russia on behalf of the US Embassy, and two extended Off-Broadway runs in New York City, in 2014 and 2015.

While living in Seattle in 2013, Migliazza performed with the rockabilly group The Dusty 45s.

In 2016, an unpublished original work of Migliazza called "Gimme Attention" was adapted to the J-pop style by the Japanese pop star Kazumi Morohoshi, and released as a signal. Migliazza performed with Morohoshi on stage at Zepp Tokyo for Morohoshi's birthday concert and release of the single.

== Awards ==
- Best Keyboardist in Tucson (TAMMY Award) - 2005
- Arizona Blues Hall of Fame - 2010
- Finalist - International Blues Challenge in Memphis, Tennessee, (The Blues Foundation) - 2010
- Best Keyboardist in Washington State (South Sound Best of the Blues Awards) - 2014
- Finalist - International Blues Challenge in Memphis (The Blues Foundation) - 2014
- Best Self Produced CD - Laying it Down (South Sound Blues Society) - 2014

== Discography ==
- Funja (The Blues Kats) - 1996
- Arthur Migliazza - 2004
- Pumping Ivories - 2006
- Positively 17th Street (17th Street Band) - 2009
- Burn Your Bridges (with Tom Walbank) - 2009
- Laying it Down - 2014
- Bumble Boogie - 2017
- Gimme Attention (Kazumi Morohoshi) - 2016
- Disturbing the Peace (Boogie Kings) - 2018
