= Maury Dean =

American musician, professor and author

- Born: 1943 (age 82–83); Detroit, Michigan, U.S.
- Education: Wayne State University; Michigan State University
- Occupations: Musician, author, professor
- Spouse: Toni (m. 1965)

Maury Dean (born 1943) is an American musician, author and former professor at Suffolk County Community College, whose book "The Rock Revolution" is in the Rock N' Roll Hall of Fame and the Smithsonian.

== Early life ==
Dean was born in Detroit, Michigan and grew up in nearby Dearborn. He attended Wayne State University but transferred to Michigan State University in 1964 after claiming "I wasted my first couple of years in an Animal House-type fraternity."

== Music and teaching ==
After earning his English doctorate, and embarking on brief teaching stints in various Detroit colleges, Dean decided to move his family out to Ronkonkoma, New York (after various colleges in Key West, Florida had no open teaching positions) in 1972 on a whim because Suffolk County Community College was looking for new faculty and he thought the town and job "sounded interesting". Dean taught a "History of Rock N' Roll" course as well as Mass Media, Journalism, and Literature courses at Suffolk County Community College. He taught for 37 years before retiring in early 2020. He also briefly taught at Miami-Dade Community College in Florida.

He was a member of the band "The Woolies", whose cover of the song "Who Do You Love?" hit the #95 spot on the Billboard Hot 100 charts in 1967. Dean was also in the rock band, 'Maury Dean & The Nite Shift' – who recorded for the Detroit-based Fortune Records. He was also a writer at Motown Records, where he says he lasted all of a few days before leaving.

== Author ==
Dean's first book, The Rock Revolution is considered one of the earliest books about rock n' roll, having been written and published in 1966. Dean has also authored Rock N' Roll Gold Rush, a book that is used as the textbook to his rock n' roll classes, as well as other professor's classes. Rock N' Roll Gold Rush also contains his opinions on music, with most of the text dedicated to his opinions on certain singles, musicians, and bands. Dean also wrote another book, about Buddy Holly, titled This'll Be the Day: The Life and Legacy of Buddy Holly. It was released in April 2009. Dean wrote another book in 2011 titled Billionaire Bingo: Saving Our Endangered Middle Class (ISBN 0-9726249-3-7). He wrote another book released in July 2021 dedicated to another one of his passions, running, titled Glory Days: Still Running Against the Wind (ISBN 0-9726249-6-1) and published by Maxwell Hunter Publishing. He has contributed to regional running publications on Long Island and in Michigan. His latest book, published in November 2024, is titled Rock the Hall: 123+ Greatest Rock Hall Recommendations.

While in college in the early 1960s, Dean wrote a book entitled The Hanging Gardens, about the teenage angst of attending high school in post-recession era Detroit, and having nothing much to look forward to except the long hours and boredom of building Fords on the assembly line at the River Rouge plant. He was in edits and rewrites with his publisher when “American Graffiti” hit the movie theaters and stole his thunder. It has been hinted that the hit TV series “Happy Days” was loosely based upon the unfinished manuscript of “The Hanging Gardens”.

== Personal life ==
Dean met his wife, Toni, in the cafeteria at Michigan State University in 1964. They were married one year later and are still married to each other as of 2024. Dean's son, Jeremy, is the keyboardist for the band Nine Days, whose song "Absolutely" hit #6 on the Billboard charts. Currently, Dean divides his time on Long Island and Detroit, Michigan, doing historical seminars. He has homes in Patchogue, New York and his native Michigan.

Dean's passion for running originally began as a way to lose some weight before he discovered how much he enjoyed it, leading to him to this present day still being an active runner. He was one of the fastest "over 40" runners on Long Island.
