= Bob Seeley =

American jazz musician (1928–2024)

Robert Seeley (September 13, 1928 – October 15, 2024) was an American boogie woogie pianist.

== Biography ==
Seeley was born in Detroit, Michigan, on September 13. 1928. He played piano at Charlie's Crab in Troy, Michigan, a northern suburb of Detroit, for over three decades. Seeley played Carnegie Hall several times, and major venues throughout Europe. He released five albums, before compiling a sixth with Bob Baldori.

His greatest influence was Meade Lux Lewis. Seeley first met Lewis during a Detroit gig in the late 1940s, and a longstanding friendship through the 1950s and 1960s developed, which influenced Seeley's piano styling. Seeley also played piano with Art Tatum. Eubie Blake was also among Seeley's circle of friends.

Seeley worked for a while as accompanist to Sippie Wallace. Seeley was an all-around pianist whose interest and repertoire span ragtime, stride, blues and boogie woogie.

Seeley also participated in the so-called "Cheek to Cheek Boogie" with Mark Braun. He performed annually at The Bloomington Blues & Boogie Woogie Piano Festival, in Bloomington, Indiana, from 2016 through 2018.Shakalis, Connie (October 13, 2025). "Bloomington Blues & Boogie Woogie Festival returns for kids adults". The Bloomington Herald-Times Online. Bloomington, IN, USA: The Bloomington Herald-Times.

Peter Silvester wrote: "His solos are notable for their coherence and logical progression, which propels them to a satisfying climax. Of all the contemporary pianists, Seeley reproduces the sound and spirit of Meade Lux Lewis with the most conviction and sometimes even surpasses the master".

Seeley lived with his mother until about age 55 and had a brother named James. He died on October 15, 2024, at the age of 96.

== Sources ==
- The Story of Boogie-Woogie - A Left Hand Like God, Silvester, Peter J., The Scarecrow Press, 2009, Maryland (USA), 2nd edition, ISBN 9780810869240
