= The Woolies =

American rock band

- Origin: Lansing, Michigan, United States
- Genres: Rock
- Years active: 1964–1975
- Past members: Bob Baldori; Stormy Rice; Jeff Baldori; Ron English; Bee Metros; Zocko Groendahl; Maury Dean

The Woolies were an American rock band from Lansing, Michigan. It was formed in 1964 by Bob Baldori, Stormy Rice, Jeff Baldori, Ron English, and Bee Metros. Their cover of "Who Do You Love?" became a regional hit when it was released as a single in 1966 and peaked at #95 on the Billboard Hot 100. Dunhill Records dropped the band after they failed to achieve much further success. In 1968, Stormy Rice left the band to begin a solo career and was replaced by Zocko Groendahl. The Woolies final release, a compilation of songs dating from 1965 to 1975 was titled Ride, Ride, Ride.

== Discography ==
=== Albums ===
- Basic Rock (1972)
- Live at Lizards (1973)
- Ride, Ride, Ride (2006)

=== Singles ===
- "Black Crow Blues" (1965)
- "Who Do You Love?" (1966)
- "Duncan and Brady" (1967)
