= Bob Baldori =

- Also known as: Boogie Bob
- Born: May 14, 1943 (age 82); Pennsylvania, U.S.
- Genres: Rock, blues, boogie
- Occupations: Musician, attorney
- Years active: 1964–present
- Label: Spirit Records
- Website: www.boog.com

Bob Baldori (born May 14, 1943), also known as "Boogie Bob", is an American rock, blues, boogie musician and attorney. He plays the guitar, harmonica and piano.

Baldori founded the rock band The Woolies in 1964; the group had a national hit in 1966 with Bo Diddley's "Who Do You Love?". He has also pursued a solo career, performing in venues all over the country, and recording a 1994 solo album. He started working with Chuck Berry in 1966 at Lake Lansing, Michigan and subsequently recorded two albums with Berry. He has also worked with and performed with Muddy Waters, John Lee Hooker, Tom Rush, Luther Allison, Del Shannon, John Hammond, Hubert Sumlin and Bo Diddley. In 2005 Baldori begun a two-piano collaboration with the pianist Bob Seeley called Seeley and Baldori, which continued steadily until 2011, at which point another pianist, Arthur Migliazza, stepped in to replace Seeley in most live performances.

== Boogie Stomp! ==
In 2012 Baldori released a documentary film called Boogie Stomp! that tells "the story of boogie woogie, its origins, subsequent history and ongoing development." It also serves as an unofficial biography of boogie woogie pianist Bob Seeley. The film appeared in film festivals around the US and was well received, winning fourteen awards.

Baldori's duo project with Arthur Migliazza was originally called Boogie Stomp! The Musical and enjoyed a one-month run at the Chain Theatre, an Off-Broadway theater in Long Island City, New York in May 2014 and a six-month run at the Elektra Theater in Times Square, New York in 2015/2016. In 2016 the duo officially changed their name to the Boogie Kings and released their first studio album, Disturbing the Peace, in 2018 on Spirit Records.

In addition to recording and performing his own material, Baldori operates his own recording studio, and has produced and engineered over 200 albums. He wrote and starred in the rock musical Almost Famous, with productions in Chicago, Toronto and in Michigan.

As an entertainment law attorney, Baldori represents many performers including Hubert Sumlin and Chuck Berry.

He lives in Okemos, Michigan, with his family.

== Partial discography ==
- Tulane (Chuck Berry), 1970 (Harmonica)
- Basic Rock (The Woolies, 1971)
- Live at Lizards (The Woolies, 1973)
- Who Do You Love (1994)
- Boogie Stomp! (with Bob Seeley, 2006)
- Disturbing the Peace (The Boogie Kings, 2018)

== Other sources ==
- "Boogie Bob Baldori and The Woolies" (Blue Suede News magazine, issue 53, Winter 2000/01)
- Interview with Baldori (WKAR Radio, August 10, 2005)
- Waiting Forty Years for the Woolies (Lansing City Pulse, May 16, 2006)
- Roll Over Beethoven (St. Louis Riverfront Times, October 25, 2006)
- Short documentary reveals history of boogie-woogie (Lansing Lowdown, March 28, 2007)
- The Woolies (Rusted Chrome: Southeast Michigan's Bands and Musicians, 1966–72)
