= Southern Maid Donuts =

Franchised donut shops based in Garland, Texas

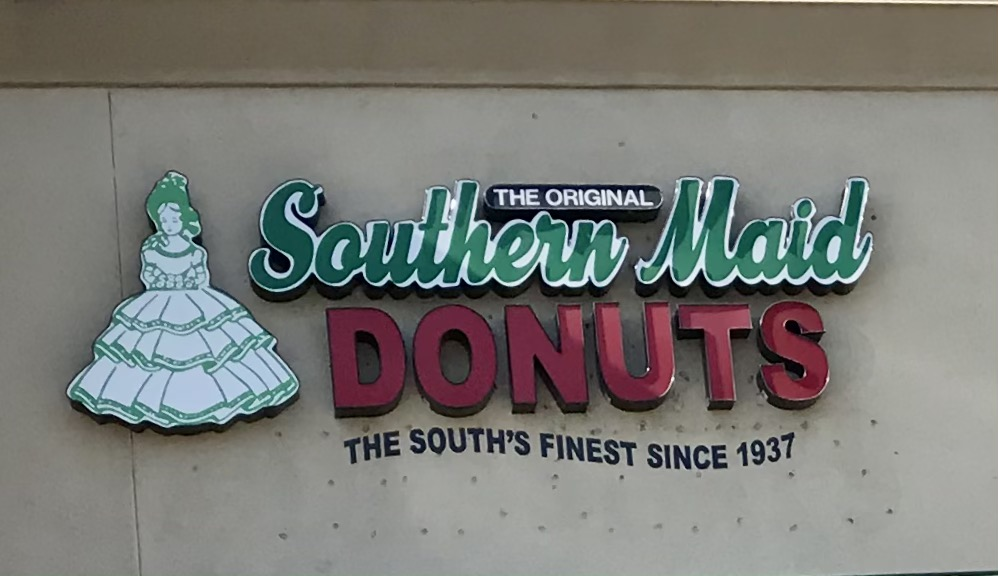
Southern Maid Donuts sign in Corona, California

Southern Maid Donuts is a chain of franchised donut shops based in Garland, Texas. The stores serves more than 30 varieties of donuts. There are currently more than 100 locations primarily in the Southern United States but stretching as far west as California. Elvis Presley recorded a jingle for the stores in 1954, which became the only product the singer ever endorsed.

The company was founded by Rosalee and John B. Hargrove who created their own brand of donut flour and designed equipment to mix and cut donuts. Their son Lon Hargrove remains president of Southern Maid Donut Flour Company

The Hargroves opened their first store in Houston, Texas in 1937. In March 1941 Bruce and Dannie Jones opened the first franchised store on Texas Street in Shreveport, Louisiana. That store is still run by the Jones family. During the 1950s the Jones family sponsored the Search for Talent television show on KTBS Channel 3 in Shreveport. Southern Maid Donuts aired a commercial featuring Dannie Jones's miniature white poodle “Miss Merry Mary” dressed in a bonnet pushing a carriage filled with Southern Maid Donuts. A photograph of the dog has become a company logo and is still emblazoned on donut boxes.
