= Mr. B. (Mark Braun) =

- Born: Mark Lincoln Braun; 1957 (age 68–69); Flint, Michigan, United States
- Genres: Boogie-woogie
- Instrument: Piano
- Label: Oldie Blues
- Website: marklincolnbraun.com

Mr. B. (born Mark Lincoln Braun, 1957), is an American boogie-woogie pianist.

== Early life ==
Born in Flint, Michigan, United States, Mark Lincoln Braun was the youngest of the three children of Phil and Sally Braun. He became interested in the piano through recordings that his father had played and began studying under the likes of Boogie Woogie Red and other famous area musicians. Between listening to records as well as the local musicians, and receiving one-on-one instructions from the local musicians, Braun's music career had begun. Mark began playing by listening and watching the local musicians perform at local venues and private lessons. Whilst immersing himself in the blues and boogie traditions and culture, Braun graduated from Flint Southwestern High School and was accepted into the prestigious University of Michigan. After completing three years towards a Bachelor of Arts in History degree, Braun decided to drop out and pursue a career in blues and boogie woogie style piano.

== Career ==
He moved to Ann Arbor as a young adult, and learned to play rock and pop piano at age 15, but was converted to blues and boogie by a Jimmy Yancey record his father gave him.

Mr. B. is a dedicated blues piano revivalist, recording tunes made famous by Yancey, as well as Little Brother Montgomery, Professor Longhair, Mercy Dee Walton, Amos Milburn, and Sunnyland Slim, among others.

== Discography ==
=== My Sunday Best ===
1994 - This is another trio date with Kurt Krahnke (bass) and Andy Conlin (drums). Also featured prominently is the drummer, Roy Brooks. "The changes in direction serve to literally amaze the listener, taking them through a range of moods and colors that are generally not experienced in such a setting. Truly, in Braun's hands, musical genres are bent into a pervasive whole, with no regard for anything but the purity of intention and the transference of joyous emotion … this is musical empathy at its best. This is not just a case of a local boy making good, this is a statement of a world class musician playing for his hometown fans." Detroit Metro Times Magazine. Recorded live at the Kerrytown Concert House in Ann Arbor, Michigan.

Track listing:

1. "My Sunday Best"
2. "Deep Excavation"
3. "Little Brother"
4. "Swanee River Boogie"
5. "La Piragua"
6. "Blues for a Carpenter"
7. "Thunder & Lightning Boogie"
8. "When I Lost My Baby"
9. "New 44 Blues"
10. "Roll 'Em Pete"
11. "Deep South Blues"

=== Hallelujah Train ===
Released on 3 September 1996 - Mr. B meets the Bird of Paradise Orchestra.

Track Listing:

1. "Hallelujah Train"
2. "Brauny"
3. "One Room Country Shack"
4. "My Sunday Best"
5. "Little Brother"
6. "Down the Road Apiece"
7. "Mardi Gras in New Orleans"
8. "Air Mail Special"
9. "La Bailarina"
10. "Deep Excavation"
11. "B's Boogie Woogie"

=== Mr. B Live ===
Mr. B Live at the Kerrytown Concert House 2002

Track Listing:

1. "Pinetop's Boogies"
2. "When the Saints Go Marching In"
3. "After Hours"
4. "Jimmy's Stuff"
5. "Cow-Cow Blues"
6. "Honky Tonk Train Blues"
7. "Sunny Side of the Street"
8. "Vicksburg Blues"
9. "Chicago Breakdown"
10. "My Babe"
11. "St. Louis Blues"

=== Cheek to Cheek ===
For many years, Mr. B. has been visiting Ann Arbor for the annual art fair. Every year he brings his bike-transported upright piano to play on the University of Michigan campus. His most famous act is the 'Cheek to Cheek Boogie' where two players boogie on a single piano, switching positions from time to time. Until recently, his only partner in this act was Bob Seeley. Both Braun and Seeley performed at The Bloomington Blues & Boogie Woogie Piano Festival, in Bloomington, Indiana, in 2017.
