= Lansky Brothers =

Clothing store in Memphis, United States

- Industry: clothing retailer
- Headquarters: Memphis, Tennessee
- Key people: Bernard Lansky

Lansky Brothers (better known as Lansky's) is a clothier in Memphis, Tennessee. It has gained worldwide recognition for being the choice location to buy clothes for musicians including Roy Orbison, Isaac Hayes, and Elvis Presley.

== History ==
Elvis Presley and Bernard Lansky in 1956.

Lansky Bros. was started in 1946 at 126 Beale Street in downtown Memphis, Tennessee. It started as a store that sold leftover Army supplies from World War II, Bernard took advantage of the elevating Beale Street music scene and looked to provide clothing for the typical characters of Beale who wanted to dress dapper. After a few years of business, Lansky Bros. already had an impressive list of customers, among them being Count Basie, Lionel Hampton, Duke Ellington and B.B. King.

At the start of 1952, Bernard noticed a young man who would continuously walk past his window and look inside, but never actually came inside to buy anything. Eventually, Bernard went to invite the man in. It was seventeen-year-old Elvis Presley, who worked at the local Loew's Theatre. According to Bernard Lansky, Elvis told him he was going to buy him out when he got enough money. According to the historical marker on Beale Street in Memphis, Bernard Lansky responded: "Elvis, don't buy me out, buy from me!" Once Elvis became an international superstar, Lansky Brothers provided much of his attire, including his outfit for his first appearance on The Ed Sullivan Show in 1956. "I put Elvis in his first suit, and I put him in his last," Lansky recalls.

In 2001, Lansky's established a new line of clothing entitled "Clothier To The King," which provides reproductions of clothing that Elvis actually wore combined with new 1950s-inspired clothing. At some point, Lansky Brothers moved from its original location at 126 Beale Street to Memphis' renowned Peabody Hotel. It subsequently re-opened a second location at 126 Beale Street inside the Hard Rock Cafe complex in July 2014 Musicians who currently shop there include The Jonas Brothers, Robert Plant, Eddie Floyd, Stephen Stills, Steven Tyler, Dr. John, Gavin DeGraw.

In 2001, Lansky Bros. unveiled a historical marker at 126 Beale St. to celebrate the history of Lansky Bros. at the original location.

Bernard died on November 15, 2012. According to his sister, he died of Alzheimer's disease.

Bernard Lansky's son (Hal Lansky) and granddaughter (Julie Lansky) continue to run the business now located in the Lobby of the Peabody Hotel.
