= Viva Las Vegas (EP) =

EP (soundtrack) by Elvis Presley
- Released: May 1964
- Recorded: July 9–11, 1963
- Studio: Radio Recorders (Hollywood)
- Genre: Pop
- Length: 10:31; 31:31 (2010 Re-release)
- Label: RCA Victor
- Producer: George Stoll

Elvis Presley chronology
| Kissin' Cousins (1964) | Viva Las Vegas (1964) | Roustabout (1964) |

Viva Las Vegas is an EP by American singer Elvis Presley, containing four songs from the 1964 motion picture Viva Las Vegas. It was released by RCA Victor in May 1964 to coincide with the film's premiere. The soundtrack EP made the Billboard Hot 100 at No. 92, the lowest-charting release of Presley's career to this point. RCA had not released a Presley EP single in two years; given the format's decreasing popularity in the United States and the disappointing chart performance of Viva Las Vegas, the company would only issue two more for the remainder of Presley's career.

== Recording and release history ==
Recording sessions took place on July 9, 10 and 11, 1963, at Radio Recorders in Hollywood, California. By then, film and soundtrack obligations were starting to back up on each other, and six weeks after the aborted "lost album" sessions of May 1963, the stable of Presley songwriters was required to come up with another dozen songs for yet another new picture. Song quality took a back seat to the need for quantity, and Presley's filming schedule made it difficult for song publishers to live up to obligations. Memphis Mafia pal Red West had written a "Ray Charles-styled" number, but so little good material had surfaced that an extra session was scheduled on August 30 for an actual Ray Charles song to be recorded, "What'd I Say".

Fifteen songs were recorded of which eleven were used in the film. For debated reasons, the idea of a full-length soundtrack long-playing album was not considered, which has attracted much criticism from various accounts, including Elvis: The Illustrated Record. Instead, to coincide with the film's release, RCA chose four songs for a Viva Las Vegas EP. In addition, the title song, along with "What'd I Say", were released as a single, catalogue 47-8360 on April 28. The strength of both sides caused it to split the difference on the chart, with "What'd I Say" peaking at disappointing No. 21 and "Viva Las Vegas" faring even worse at No. 29.

The remaining songs from the film were released sporadically over the ensuing decades. The Neapolitan song, "Santa Lucia", was placed on the compilation, Elvis for Everyone, in 1965. Later, "Night Life" and "Do the Vega" (neither of which were used in the film) and a medley of "The Yellow Rose of Texas"/"The Eyes of Texas" were released on the RCA Camden release, Elvis Sings Flaming Star, in 1969.

Presley recorded three duets with co-star Ann-Margret for the film; only one, "The Lady Loves Me", was used in the movie and it would not be officially issued by RCA until the posthumous collection, Elvis: A Legendary Performer Volume 4 in 1983. Of the other two, "You're the Boss" debuted on Elvis Sings Leiber & Stoller in 1991., while a duet version of the ballad "Today, Tomorrow and Forever" (sung by Elvis alone in the film), was first released as the title track of a four-CD box set issued by RCA in 2002.

One track, a rhythm and blues dance number called "The Climb", performed by George MacFadden of the Jubilee Four backed by the Jordanaires and an uncredited Presley, would not be officially released until 2018 (see "Reissues", below).

Ann-Margret recorded two solo numbers for the film, neither of which were released for years, either, with "My Rival" first appearing on the 1984 Australian album The Many Moods of Ann-Margret on Raven Records (with the label noting "by arrangement with RCA Records), and "Appreciation" first officially appearing in 1996 on the Rhino Records compilation, Bachelor in Paradise: Cocktail Classics from M-G-M Films.

Released during Beatlemania and the beginning of the British Invasion, North American box office receipts of $9,442,967 were markedly higher than The Beatles' first motion picture, A Hard Day's Night, which was released two months later worldwide, earning $1,626,784 in worldwide receipts.

== Reissues ==
In 1993, Viva Las Vegas was released as part of the RCA 'Double Features' remastered collection. This edition had all the twelve songs and 11 of the Roustabout soundtrack.

In 2003 the complete soundtrack was reissued on the Follow That Dream collectors label in a special edition that contained the original album tracks along with a selection of alternate takes.

In January 2010, as part of the 75th anniversary of Presley's birth, Sony Music finally released an official almost-complete soundtrack album which included all twelve songs recorded for the film. The front cover of the CD insert reproduces the images used for the original EP release, and also adds the words "...AND MORE" as part of the text. The release was not a complete soundtrack, as it omitted the film version of "C'mon Everybody" (which featured whistling as well as backing vocals by Ann-Margret), the duet version of "Today, Tomorrow and Forever" and "The Climb" featuring Presley on backing vocals. It also excludes the songs with Ann-Margret on lead vocals, "My Rival" and "Appreciation". The original film version of "What'd I Say" also featured backing vocals by Ann-Margret and has yet to be officially released.

In August 2018 the Follow That Dream label released The Viva Las Vegas Sessions as a Special 3–CD Deluxe Edition, which made the film version of "C'mon Everybody" and "The Climb" officially available for the first time. According to the track listing, a version of "The Climb" was recorded for record release.

== Track listing ==
Original release side one
| No. | Title | Writer(s) | Length |
|---|---|---|---|
| 1. | "If You Think I Don't Need You" (recorded 1963-07-09) | Red West, Joe Cooper | 2:07 |
| 2. | "I Need Somebody to Lean On" (recorded 1963-07-10) | Doc Pomus, Mort Shuman | 3:03 |

Original release side two
| No. | Title | Writer(s) | Length |
|---|---|---|---|
| 1. | "C'mon Everybody" (recorded 1963-07-09) | Joy Byers | 2:21 |
| 2. | "Today, Tomorrow and Forever" (recorded 1963-07-11) | Bill Giant, Bernie Baum, Florence Kaye | 3:27 |

2010 expanded reissue
| No. | Title | Writer(s) | Length |
|---|---|---|---|
| 1. | "Viva Las Vegas" | Doc Pomus, Mort Shuman | 2:27 |
| 2. | "What'd I Say" | Ray Charles | 3:06 |
| 3. | "If You Think I Don't Need You" | Red West, Joe Cooper | 2:07 |
| 4. | "I Need Somebody to Lean On" | Doc Pomus, Mort Shuman | 3:03 |
| 5. | "C'mon Everybody" | Joy Byers | 2:21 |
| 6. | "Today, Tomorrow and Forever" | Bill Giant, Bernie Baum, Florence Kaye | 3:27 |
| 7. | "Night Life" | Bill Giant, Bernie Baum, Florence Kaye | 1:52 |
| 8. | "Santa Lucia" | Traditional | 1:14 |
| 9. | "Do the Vega" | Bill Giant, Bernie Baum, Florence Kaye | 2:26 |
| 10. | "You're the Boss" (with Ann-Margret) | Jerry Leiber and Mike Stoller | 2:47 |
| 11. | "The Yellow Rose of Texas" / "The Eyes of Texas" | Fred Wise, Randy Starr, John Sinclair | 2:58 |
| 12. | "The Lady Loves Me" (with Ann-Margret) | Sid Tepper, Roy C. Bennett | 3:43 |

== Personnel ==
- Elvis Presley – vocals
- The Jordanaires – background vocals
- The Jubilee Four – background vocals on "What'd I Say"
- The Carole Lombard Quartet – background vocals on "What'd I Say"
- Ann-Margret – vocals on "The Lady Loves Me" and "You're the Boss"
- George McFadden – lead vocals on "The Climb”
- Scotty Moore – electric guitar
- Tiny Timbrell – electric guitar
- Billy Strange – electric guitar
- Glen Campbell – electric guitar on "What'd I Say"
- Alton Hendrickson – electric guitar on "What'd I Say"
- Bob Moore – double bass
- Ray Siegel – double bass on "What'd I Say"
- Floyd Cramer – piano
- Calvin Jackson – piano, organ
- Artie Kane – piano on "What'd I Say"
- D. J. Fontana – drums
- Buddy Harman – drums
- Frank Carlson – drums
- Hal Blaine – drums
- Roy Harte – percussion
- Boots Randolph – saxophone
- William Green – saxophone
- Steve Douglas – saxophone on "What'd I Say"
- Oliver Mitchell – trumpet
- James Zito – trumpet
- Herb Taylor – trombone
- Randall Miller – trombone
