= All Shook Up (musical) =

Musical

- Promotional poster for original Broadway production of All Shook Up
- Music: Various
- Lyrics: Various
- Book: Joe DiPietro
- Basis: Inspired by the music of Elvis Presley and the works of William Shakespeare
- Productions: 2004 Chicago; 2005 Broadway; 2006 United States tour 2009 Netherlands; 2014 Seoul; 2015 UK Tour; 2016 Seoul

All Shook Up is an American jukebox musical with music from the Elvis Presley songbook and with a book by Joe DiPietro.

The show concerns the repressed residents of an unnamed American town in the Midwest during the summer of 1955 who experience an awakening when a leather-clad guitar-strumming roustabout rolls into town. The story takes inspiration from the comedies of William Shakespeare, particularly Twelfth Night, As You Like It, A Midsummer Night's Dream, and Much Ado About Nothing. It explores themes such as authoritarianism, segregation, and homosexuality.

The musical premiered on Broadway in 2005.

== Production history ==
The musical had a developmental staging at the Goodspeed Musicals May 13 – June 6, 2004, with most of the Broadway cast, except for Manley Pope in the lead role of Chad. Christopher Ashley directed, with choreography by Jody Moccia. The musical had a tryout in Chicago at the Cadillac Palace from December 19, 2004, through January 23, 2005. After the tryout, changes were made to the finale and to add "a more specific instrumental and vocal voice" for Chad.

=== Broadway ===
The musical premiered on Broadway at the Palace Theatre on March 24, 2005, and closed on September 25, 2005, after 213 performances and 33 previews. Directed by Christopher Ashley, with choreography by Ken Roberson, the original Broadway cast included Cheyenne Jackson (Chad), Jenn Gambatese (Natalie Haller/Ed), and Jonathan Hadary (Jim Haller).

=== US National tour ===
The US National tour played 35 cities in September 2006 – 2007, directed by Christopher Ashley, and featuring Joe Mandragona as Chad, and Jenny Fellner as Natalie Haller/Ed. Sergio Trujillo revised the choreography for the tour.

=== "Love Me Tender" - 2015 UK Tour ===
A UK tour of the show commenced at Manchester Opera House in June 2015, with the show being retitled "Love Me Tender". The production starred Mica Paris as 'Sylvia', Sian Reeves as 'Mayor Matilda Hyde', Shaun Williamson as 'Jim Haller' and Ben Lewis as 'Chad'.

== Synopsis ==
This synopsis is based on the current licensed version

=== Act One ===
Somewhere in the Midwest in the summer of 1955, Chad, a guitar-playing roustabout, is released from a week in jail ("Jailhouse Rock"). In a nearby dreary little town, a young mechanic named Natalie Haller yearns for love and adventure, unaware that her best friend Dennis has a crush on her. Sitting in Sylvia's Honky-Tonk, the townspeople lament their feelings of loneliness ("Heartbreak Hotel"), before getting interrupted by the roar of a motorbike; Chad has arrived in town ("Roustabout").

In need of a mechanic, Chad is introduced to Natalie, who is instantly smitten ("One Night With You"). Upon learning that Mayor Matilda Hyde and the silent Sheriff Earl enforce the Mamie Eisenhower Decency Act, outlawing "loud music, public necking, and tight pants", Chad seeks to incite rebelliousness in the citizens ("C'mon Everybody"). Whilst Natalie repairs his motorbike, Chad inspires her to take to the open road ("Follow That Dream").

Chad recruits Dennis as his sidekick. The newly-formed duo meets the town's museum owner, Miss Sandra, whom Chad instantly falls in love with. He attempts to smooth-talk her, but she resists ("Teddy Bear/Hound Dog"), retreating to the Honky-Tonk where Natalie's widowed father, Jim Haller, also falls for her.

Matilda's teenage son, Dean Hyde, declares his love for Sylvia's daughter, Lorraine. Chad encourages their blossoming relationship, much to Sylvia's dismay ("That's All Right"). Matilda demands that Dean be sent away on a bus to a military academy. However, Dean disobeys his mother to stay in town with Lorraine ("It's Now or Never").

Desperate for Chad's attention, Natalie disguises herself as a bearded man named 'Ed' to grow closer to him ("Love Me Tender"). Ed dramatically rides into town, with Chad instantly dropping Dennis as his sidekick in favor of him ("Blue Suede Shoes"). Jim receives romance advice from Chad, both unaware they seek the same woman ("Don't Be Cruel"). Under Chad's orders, Ed visits the museum to give Sandra a Shakespearean sonnet, which Dennis had previously suggested, though Sandra unexpectedly finds herself attracted to Ed. Flustered, Ed tries leaving, but Sandra is intent on seducing him ("Let Yourself Go").

Matilda, appalled that Dean has stayed in town to be with Lorraine, vows to arrest Chad due to his influence. Ed suggests that Chad should hide in the town's abandoned fairgrounds to evade capture. Jim, now with extra confidence, condemns Sylvia for having grown so bitter and gives her a very surprising kiss. Soon, everyone in town finds themselves escaping to the fairgrounds, desperate for someone to love ("Can't Help Falling in Love").

=== Act Two ===
In the abandoned fairgrounds, the townspeople each search for their love ("All Shook Up"). Dennis reveals to Natalie that he's upset about the way Chad treats her, but she disregards his concerns ("It Hurts Me"). Disguised as Ed, Natalie attempts to bond with Chad by asking for advice on seducing a woman, but accidentally kisses him in the process ("A Little Less Conversation"). Chad and Jim discover they are both pursuing the same woman: Sandra, who is lustfully searching the fairgrounds for Ed ("The Power of My Love"). Chad quickly realizes that he, too, has feelings for his new sidekick ("I Don't Want To").

Meanwhile, Matilda and Earl are hunting for the elusive roustabout ("(You're the) Devil in Disguise"). Jim, heartbroken that Sandra doesn't care for him, comes across Sylvia, who confesses her feelings for him ("There's Always Me"). Dean and Lorraine plan to leave town, but they run into Chad, who convinces them to stay and fight for their love ("If I Can Dream").

Chad, Dean, and Lorraine confront Matilda. Earl finally breaks his silence, denying Matilda's orders to arrest Chad and instead confessing his love for her. With a newfound acceptance for love, Matilda allows Dean and Lorraine to remain together, as does Sylvia ("Can't Help Falling in Love (Reprise)"). Chad bravely confesses his feelings for Ed, who reveals his true identity as Natalie, causing Chad to leave town abruptly. Dennis takes the opportunity to confess his long-time crush to Natalie, who kindly rejects him. However, he and Sandra realize a common admiration for Shakespeare and subsequently fall for one another. Left alone with her father, Jim, Natalie reconciles with Chad's absence ("Fools Fall in Love").

The next day, a triple wedding takes place: Jim & Sylvia, Matilda & Earl, and Dennis & Sandra. Chad makes an unexpected return to the town, interrupting the wedding and declaring his love for Natalie. She decides to pursue her dreams with him and hit the open road together. The brides and grooms marry while the town celebrates ("Burning Love"). After the bows at curtain call, the cast sings one last song ("C'mon Everybody (Encore)").

== Characters ==
Source (copied directly from the All Shook Up libretto):

- Chad - A great-lookin', motorcyclin', guitar-playin', leather-jacketed roustabout.
- Natalie Haller - A young woman and an excellent mechanic. She's much more at home in greasy overalls than a dress.
- Dennis - An awkward young man. He aspires to be a dentist.
- Miss Sandra - The beautiful, intellectual caretaker of the town's museum.
- Sylvia - The no-nonsense, African-American owner of Sylvia's Honky-Tonk.
- Jim Haller - Natalie's widowed father. Middle-aged and messy, he still longs for his wife.
- Lorraine - Sylvia's teenage daughter. Pretty, smart and a total romantic.
- Dean Hyde - Matilda's teenage son. He has spent his youth at military boarding schools and he has never disobeyed his mother.
- Mayor Matilda Hyde - The town's very conservative mayor.
- Sheriff Earl - The law in town and a man of not many words. He loyally follows the Mayor wherever she goes.

== Casts ==
Character	Broadway	US Tour	UK Tour	Australia
Character	2005	2006	2015	2023
Chad	Cheyenne Jackson	Joe Mandragona	Ben Lewis	John Berry
Natalie Haller/Ed	Jenn Gambatese	Jenny Fellner	Laura Tebbutt	Mia Simonette
Dennis	Mark Price	Dennis Moench	Mark Anderson	Tate Bennett
Miss Sandra	Leah Hocking	Susan Anton	Kate Tydman	Emma Haines
Sylvia	Sharon Wilkins	NaTasha Yvette Williams	Mica Paris	Paula Parore
Jim Haller	Jonathan Hadary	Wally Dunn	Shaun Williamson	Brendan Hanson
Lorraine	Nikki M. James	Valisia Lekae Little	Aretha Ayeh	Jade Baynes
Dean Hyde	Curtis Holbrook	Brian Sears	Felix Mosse	Joshua Firman
Mayor Matilda Hyde	Alix Korey	Beth Glover	Siân Reeves	Taneel Van Zyl
Sheriff Earl	John Jellison	David Benoit	Chris Howell	Clay Darius

== Musical numbers ==
This song list is based on the current licensed version

Act I

- "Jailhouse Rock" - Chad, Ensemble (Music and lyrics by Jerry Leiber and Mike Stoller)
- "Heartbreak Hotel" - Dennis, Sylvia, Lorraine, Jim, Ensemble (Music and lyrics by Elvis Presley, Mae Boren Axton, and Tommy Durden)
- "Roustabout" - Chad (Music and lyrics by Florence Kaye, Bernie Baum, and Bill Giant)
- "One Night With You" - Natalie (Music and lyrics by Pearl King and Dave Bartholomew)
- "C'mon Everybody" - Chad, Natalie, Dennis, Ensemble (Music and lyrics by Joy Byers)
- "Follow That Dream" - Chad, Natalie (Music and lyrics by Ben Weisman and Fred Wise)
- "Teddy Bear/Hound Dog" - Chad, Dennis, Sandra, Natalie (Music and lyrics by Kal Mann and Bernie Lowe/Leiber and Stoller)
- "That's All Right" - Chad, Dennis, Lorraine, Dean, Sylvia, Natalie, Ensemble (Music and lyrics by Arthur Crudup)
- "It's Now or Never" - Dean, Lorraine, Ensemble (Music and lyrics by Aaron Schroeder and Wally Gold)
- "Love Me Tender" - Chad, Natalie (Music and lyrics by Presley and Vera Matson)
- "Blue Suede Shoes" - Ed, Chad, Dennis, Ensemble (Music and lyrics by Carl Perkins)
- "Don't Be Cruel" - Chad, Jim (Music and lyrics by Presley and Otis Blackwell)
- "Let Yourself Go" - Sandra, Ensemble (Music and lyrics by Byers)
- "Can't Help Falling in Love" - Sylvia, Dennis, Sandra, Chad, Jim, Ed, Lorraine, Dean, Ensemble (Music and lyrics by Hugo Peretti, Luigi Creatore, and George David Weiss)

Act II

- "All Shook Up" - Chad, Ed, Dean, Lorraine, Dennis, Jim, Sylvia, Sandra, Ensemble (Music and lyrics by Presley and Blackwell)
- "It Hurts Me" - Dennis, Ensemble (Music and lyrics by Byers and Charlie Daniels)
- "A Little Less Conversation" - Ed, Female Ensemble (Music and lyrics by Mac Davis and Billy Strange)
- "The Power of My Love" - Chad, Jim, Sandra (Music and lyrics by Giant, Baum, and Kaye)
- "I Don't Want To" - Chad (Music and lyrics by Fred Spielman and Janice Torre)
- "(You're the) Devil in Disguise" - Matilda, Ensemble (Music and lyrics by Giant, Baum, and Kaye)
- "There's Always Me" - Sylvia (Music and lyrics by Don Robertson)
- "If I Can Dream" - Chad, Lorraine, Dean, Ensemble (Music and lyrics by W. Earl Brown)
- "Can't Help Falling in Love" (Reprise) - Earl, Jim, Sylvia, Matilda
- "Fools Fall in Love" - Natalie, Ensemble (Music and lyrics by Leiber and Stoller)
- "Burning Love" - Company (Music and lyrics by Dennis Linde)
- "C'mon Everybody" (Encore) - Chad, Company

== Instrumentation ==
The original Broadway production had fifteen musicians, including the musical director and associate conductor. The original production was scored for two keyboards, two guitars, electric bass, drums, percussion, four woodwinds, three trumpets, and trombone. The first keyboard part was played by the conductor and the second keyboard part also doubled on organ. The first woodwind part doubled on piccolo, flute, clarinet, and alto sax; the second on flute, clarinet, and alto sax; the third on clarinet and tenor sax; the fourth on bass clarinet and baritone sax. There were also three trumpets where the first trumpet is the lead trumpet. The trumpets also doubled on flugelhorn.

The orchestration that is under the current license is based on the national tour version; there are only twelve musicians. The percussion part is removed, there are now three woodwind parts, and two trumpets. The rest remain the same. This time the first woodwind part doubles on flute and alto sax; the second on clarinet and tenor sax; the third on bass clarinet and baritone sax.

=== Original Broadway production ===
Year	Award	Category	Nominee	Result
2005	Drama Desk Award	Drama Desk Award for Outstanding Scenic Design of a Musical	David Rockwell	Nominated
2005	Outer Critics Circle Award	Outstanding New Broadway Musical		Nominated
2005	Outer Critics Circle Award	Outstanding Actor in a Musical	Cheyenne Jackson	Nominated
2005	Outer Critics Circle Award	Outstanding Actress in a Musical	Jenn Gambatese	Nominated
2005	Theatre World Award		Cheyenne Jackson	Won

== Recording ==
The Original Broadway Cast Recording was released on May 31, 2005, by BMG Marketing.

== Controversy ==
The musical was the source of a minor controversy when students put it on at Herriman High School in Utah. After discussion, the play was allowed to go on after "minor edits to Presley's songs and scene changes" to reduce its sexuality.

== See also ==
For other plays relating to Elvis Presley, see also Cooking with Elvis.
