= Kissin' Cousins (soundtrack) =

Soundtrack album by Elvis Presley
- Released: April 2, 1964
- Recorded: May–September 1963
- Studio: RCA Studio B (Nashville)
- Genre: Pop; rock and roll
- Length: 26:15
- Label: RCA Victor
- Producer: Gene Nelson; Fred Karger

Elvis Presley chronology
| Fun in Acapulco (1963) | Kissin' Cousins (1964) | Viva Las Vegas (1964) |

Singles from Kissin' Cousins
- 1. "Kissin' Cousins" Released: September 30, 1963

Professional ratings
Review scores
| Source | Rating |
|---|---|
| Allmusic | 2/5 stars |
| Record Mirror | 2/5 stars |

Kissin' Cousins is the eighth soundtrack album by American singer and musician Elvis Presley, released by RCA Victor in mono and stereo, LPM/LSP 2894, in April 1964. It is the soundtrack to the 1964 film of the same name starring Presley. Recording sessions took place at RCA Studio B in Nashville, Tennessee, on May 26 and 27, and September 29 and 30, 1963. It peaked at number six on the Billboard Top LPs chart.

== Background ==
Since the sessions for Viva Las Vegas had gone way over budget, released after but completed before Kissin' Cousins, Presley's manager, Colonel Tom Parker determined for fiscal prudence to have the songs recorded at Studio B, away from Hollywood and its distractions, and its platoon of available on-call musicians. Demand for songs to fill long-playing soundtrack albums, by now a regularity as the EP single was becoming less and less a viable sales item, strained the resources of the stable of Presley songwriters, with five songs alone originating from the team of Giant, Baum and Kaye.

== Content ==
Ten soundtrack songs were recorded by Presley with members of the Nashville A-Team during two evening sessions in September, with two distinct versions by different songwriters of the title track, one (titled "Kissin' Cousins") recorded in Presley's normal voice and the other (titled "Kissin' Cousins (No. 2)") with a mock-hillbilly twang. The former version of "Kissin' Cousins" would be issued as a single in February 1964, with "It Hurts Me" on the B-side. It would peak at number 12 on the Billboard Hot 100, its flipside making it independently to No. 29. It became a gold record. "Anyone (Could Fall In Love With You)", included in the album, was omitted from the film. "Pappy, Won't You Please Come Home", performed by Glenda Farrell, is included in the film but omitted from the album.

As had happened with soundtrack of Fun in Acapulco, two additional tracks, "Echoes of Love" and "(It's a) Long Lonely Highway" by Doc Pomus and Mort Shuman were taken from the aborted "lost" album sessions of May 1963, and added here to bring the running order up to twelve tracks. Three selections – "Once Is Enough", "One Boy, Two Little Girls", and the single – were on the 1995 soundtrack compilation, Command Performances: The Essential 60s Masters II.

== Track listing ==
Side one
| No. | Title | Writer(s) | Recording date | Length |
|---|---|---|---|---|
| 1. | "Kissin' Cousins (Number 2)" | Bernie Baum, Bill Giant, Florence Kaye | September 29, 1963 | 1:16 |
| 2. | "Smokey Mountain Boy" | Lenore Rosenblatt, Victor Millrose | September 30, 1963 | 2:37 |
| 3. | "There's Gold in the Mountains" | Bernie Baum, Bill Giant, Florence Kaye | September 29, 1963 | 1:54 |
| 4. | "One Boy, Two Little Girls" | Bernie Baum, Bill Giant, Florence Kaye | September 29, 1963 | 2:32 |
| 5. | "Catchin' On Fast" | Bernie Baum, Bill Giant, Florence Kaye | September 30, 1963 | 1:21 |
| 6. | "Tender Feeling" | Bernie Baum, Bill Giant, Florence Kaye | September 29, 1963 | 2:33 |

Side two
| No. | Title | Writer(s) | Recording date | Length |
|---|---|---|---|---|
| 1. | "Anyone (Could Fall in Love with You)" (omitted from film) | Bennie Benjamin, Luchi de Jesus, and Sol Marcus | September 30, 1963 | 2:29 |
| 2. | "Barefoot Ballad" | Dolores Fuller, Larry Morris | September 30, 1963 | 2:26 |
| 3. | "Once Is Enough" | Sid Tepper and Roy C. Bennett | September 29, 1963 | 1:55 |
| 4. | "Kissin' Cousins" | Fred Wise and Randy Starr | September 30, 1963 | 2:14 |
| 5. | "Echoes of Love" (bonus track) | Bob Roberts and Paddy McMains | May 26, 1963 | 2:20 |
| 6. | "(It's a) Long Lonely Highway" (bonus track) | Doc Pomus and Mort Shuman | May 27, 1963 | 2:38 |

Note

- "Kissin' Cousins" was released as a single (RCA 47-8307) on February 10, 1964. It reached number 12 on the Billboard Hot 100 chart. The single's B-side, "It Hurts Me" (not from the film) reached number 29. The British release of the single (RCA 1404) reached number 10.

== Personnel ==
- Elvis Presley – vocals
- The Jordanaires – backing vocals
- Millie Kirkham – backing vocals
- Dolores Edgin – backing vocals
- Winnifred Brest – backing vocals
- Boots Randolph – saxophone, jug on "Barefoot Ballad"
- Bill Justis – saxophone
- Cecil Brower – fiddle
- Scotty Moore – electric guitar
- Grady Martin – electric guitar
- Jerry Kennedy – electric guitar, banjo on "Smokey Mountain Boy"
- Harold Bradley – electric guitar, banjo on "Barefoot Ballad"
- Floyd Cramer – piano
- Bob Moore – double bass
- D.J. Fontana – drums
- Buddy Harman – drums

== Charts ==
Album

| Year | Chart | Position |
|---|---|---|
| 1964 | Billboard Pop Albums | 6 |
