= C'mon Everybody (album) =

Compilation album by Elvis Presley
- Released: July 1, 1971
- Recorded: July 2, 1961 – September 28, 1966
- Genre: Rock
- Length: 22:58
- Label: RCA Camden

Elvis Presley chronology
Love Letters from Elvis (1971)	C'mon Everybody (1971)	The Other Sides – Elvis Worldwide Gold Award Hits Vol. 2 (1971)

Professional ratings
Review scores
Source	Rating
The Rolling Stone Record Guide	5/5 stars

C'mon Everybody is a compilation album by American singer and musician Elvis Presley released by RCA Records on July 1, 1971. The album was certified Gold on January 6, 2004 by the Recording Industry Association of America.

== Content ==
All tracks from C'Mon Everybody originated from four of Elvis's films and were only released on soundtrack EP's prior to this issue. The remaining EP tracks from the same four movies were compiled into another budget RCA Camden album, I Got Lucky, released three months later. All ten tracks are monaural recordings.

== Track listing ==
Side one
No.	Title	Writer(s)	Recording date	Length
1.	"C'mon Everybody" (from Viva Las Vegas)	Joy Byers	July 9, 1963	2:18
2.	"Angel" (from Follow That Dream)	Sid Tepper, Roy C. Bennett	July 2, 1961	2:38
3.	"Easy Come, Easy Go" (from Easy Come, Easy Go)	Ben Weisman, Sid Wayne	September 28, 1966	2:10
4.	"A Whistling Tune" (from Kid Galahad)	Sherman Edwards, Hal David	October 26, 1961	2:38
5.	"Follow That Dream" (from Follow That Dream)	Fred Wise, Ben Weisman	July 2, 1961	1:37

Side two
No.	Title	Writer(s)	Recording date	Length
1.	"King of the Whole Wide World" (from Kid Galahad)	Ruth Batchelor, Bob Roberts	October 27, 1961	2:07
2.	"I'll Take Love" (from Easy Come, Easy Go)	Dolores Fuller, Mark Barkan	September 28, 1966	2:13
3.	"Today, Tomorrow and Forever" (from Viva Las Vegas)	Mack David, Sherman Edwards	July 11, 1963	3:25
4.	"I'm Not the Marrying Kind" (from Follow That Dream)	Ben Weisman, Fred Wise	July 2, 1961	1:50
5.	"This Is Living" (from Kid Galahad)	Bill Giant, Bernie Baum, Florence Kaye	October 27, 1961	1:43

== Certifications ==
Region	Certification	Certified units/sales
France (SNEP)	Gold	100,000^{*}
^{*} Sales figures based on certification alone.
