= C'mon Everybody (Elvis Presley song) =

Song by Elvis Presley

from the EP Viva Las Vegas
- Released: 1964
- Recorded: July 9, 1963
- Studio: Radio Recorders, Hollywood
- Label: RCA
- Songwriter: Joy Byers

"C'mon Everybody" is a song written by Joy Byers and originally recorded by Elvis Presley for the 1964 MGM motion picture Viva Las Vegas. It made in into the top 10 in the Philippines and in South Africa.

== Composition ==
The song was written by Joy Byers. Elvis had previously had a modest hit with another of Byers' songs, "It Hurts Me", in 1964.

== Recording and release ==
The version that appeared on the soundtrack EP was recorded by Elvis on July 9, 1963, at Radio Recorders in Hollywood. The recording session featured Billy Strange, Scotty Moore and Tiny Timbrell on guitar, Bob Moore on bass, D.J. Fontana, Buddy Harman and Frank Carlson on drums, Floyd Cramer and Dudley Brooks on piano, Calvin Jackson on organ, and Boots Randolph on saxophone. Additional vocals were provided by The Jordanaires.

Eight years later, the song gave its title to a compilation of Presley's movie songs (C'mon Everybody, 1971).

The actual film version of the song "C'mon Everybody", featuring whistling as well as backing vocals by Ann-Margret, was later included on the special 3-CD Deluxe Edition of the Viva Las Vegas EP released by the label Follow That Dream in August 2018.

== Track listing ==
7" promo single (RCA Victor SP-45-118)
No.	Title	Writer(s)	Artist	Length
1.	"C'mon Everybody"	Joy Byers	Elvis Presley	2:18
2.	"King of the Whole Wide World"	Bob Roberts, Ruth Batchelor	Elvis Presley with the Jordanaires	2:07

== Charts ==
Chart (1964)	Peak position
Belgium (Ultratip Bubbling Under Wallonia)	–
