= Frankie and Johnny (soundtrack) =

1966 soundtrack album by Elvis Presley

Soundtrack album by Elvis Presley
- Released: March 1, 1966
- Recorded: May 12–14, 1965
- Studio: Radio Recorders (Hollywood)
- Genres: Dixieland; ragtime
- Length: 26:40
- Label: RCA Victor
- Producer: Fred Karger

Elvis Presley chronology
Harum Scarum (1965)	Frankie and Johnny (1966)	Paradise, Hawaiian Style (1966)

Singles from Frankie and Johnny
- 1. "Frankie and Johnny" / "Please Don't Stop Loving Me" Released: March 1, 1966

Frankie and Johnny is the twelfth soundtrack album by American singer and musician Elvis Presley, released on RCA Victor Records in mono and stereo, LPM/LSP 3553, on March 1, 1966. An excursion into Dixieland and ragtime music, it is the soundtrack to the 1966 film of the same name starring Presley. Recording sessions took place at Radio Recorders in Hollywood, California, on May 12, 13, and 14, 1965. It peaked at number 20 on the Top LP's chart. It was certified Gold and Platinum on January 6, 2004, by the Recording Industry Association of America.

== Content ==
To coincide with the 19th century setting of the film, some traditional song material was used for the soundtrack. "When the Saints Go Marching In" is an old gospel hymn that has become a jazz standard associated with the traditional hot jazz of New Orleans. It is paired in a medley with "Down by the Riverside", another traditional gospel song dating back to the relevant time period. Both are in the public domain, and the team of Giant, Baum, and Kaye captured the publishing for Freddy Bienstock and Presley's manager, Colonel Tom Parker. The title song, "Frankie and Johnny", is a variant on the American popular song first published in 1904 and credited to Hughie Cannon. With changed lyrics, another publishing royalty was secured for Gladys Music.

Stephen Thomas Erlewine wrote that, due to the film's period setting, the album is dominated by retro Dixieland music, while biographer Mike Eder wrote that the period setting allows the album to "[get] away with a bit more than usual", with a deliberately "outdated" sound. Peter Jones and Jopling Norman described the record as "very rag-time", with vibrant, brassy backings that add variety to Presley's catalogue. The authors of Elvis (2001) wrote that the album de-emphasised Presley's "rocking beat" in favour of "old-timey Dixie and ragtime beat". Adam Litovitz noted the mix of traditional songs "with an ersatz Dixieland flavor" alongside "blues, gospel, and gypsy music at their cheesiest". Regarding the title track, Eder noted that "touches of jazz" are rare on a Presley album. He also noted the "mock-gypsy melody" on "Chesay" and added that "Everybody Come Around", "Shout It Out" and "Come Along" have vaudeville arrangements with "old-time Dixie horns", ukulele and banjo.

Twelve songs were recorded at the sessions for Frankie and Johnny, and all were used and issued on the soundtrack. The title song was issued as a single, with "Please Don't Stop Loving Me" on the B-side. Released either just before or simultaneously with the album, depending if the disputed release dates are correct, "Frankie and Johnny" peaked at number 25 on the Billboard Hot 100, with the B-side also charting at number 45.

== Critical reception ==
Professional ratings
Review scores
Source	Rating
AllMusic	1/5 stars
Encyclopedia of Popular Music	2/5 stars
Record Mirror	4/5 stars

In a contemporary review of Frankie and Johnny for Record Mirror, Peter Jones and Jopling Norman wrote that Presley fans would enjoy the album's songs, while "trad fans" would enjoy the backings, noting that some listeners "might even think that Elvis has gone more versatile but it's only the backings." Overall he deemed the record to be "very pleasing and enjoyable".

In his retrospective review for AllMusic, Stephen Thomas Erlewine wrote that the album's Dixieland style kept Presley "far, far away from the swinging Mod explosion in pop music in 1966", further commenting that although the double-time breakdowns on "Shout It Out" features hints of "high-booted go-go-music", its impact is lessened by the late appearance of the song on the record, after "the clamor of the brass bands, tambourines, and bass drums". He added that "What Every Woman Lives For" and "Beginner's Luck" were minor highlights but that overall, "Frankie and Johnny is one relentless, noisy, ugly record, its decibel level cranked to the breaking point and Presley appearing singularly mirthless throughout."

In his 2016 ranking of Presley's 57 albums, Adam Litovitz of Variety placed Frankie and Johnny last. He noted that Presley had become tired with recording soundtracks and "threw a tantrum in the studio" and began recording his vocals away from the musicians, with the album being "the painful result". He criticised "What Every Woman Lives For" for being "ultra-sexist".

Mike Eder deemed the album a "miniscule [sic] improvement on the albums it followed and preceded", but still criticised the record and noted that it contains similarly "atrocious vocal mixes" to Presley's 1965 works. However, he noted some highlights, such as "Chesay" and the "second-rate vaudeville" songs, as well as some ballads "pretty enough to rise above the prevailing mood of languor". The authors of Elvis (2001) believed that Presley handled the ragtime and Dixieland material "very well", and highlighted the title song.

== Reissues ==
=== Pickwick ===
Frankie & Johnny

Soundtrack album (Reissue) by Elvis Presley
- Released: November 1976
- Recorded: 1965
- Length: 21:40
- Label: Pickwick Records

Elvis Presley chronology
From Elvis Presley Boulevard, Memphis, Tennessee (1976)	Frankie & Johnny (1976)	Welcome to My World (1977)

During the 1970s, Pickwick Records obtained the rights to reissue Presley compilation albums previously issued under the budget RCA Camden label between 1969 and 1973. Several tracks from Frankie and Johnny had been included on Camden releases; in 1976, Pickwick expanded its mandate and reissued the film's soundtrack album with a new cover showing a 1970s-era image of Presley and the title slightly amended to Frankie & Johnny. The running order of the tracks was altered and three songs from the original album were omitted — "Chesay", "Look Out Broadway", and "Everybody Come Aboard". The front cover does not indicate that this is a reissued soundtrack album, and it was Elvis' only soundtrack to be reissued in this way. It did not chart on the Billboard 200. This oddity remained in print for several years and when, following Presley's death in August 1977, RCA began reissuing all of his albums, the agreement between RCA and Pickwick prohibited RCA from reissuing the original, complete soundtrack album in the US for several years due to the existence of this version. The original Frankie and Johnny soundtrack album was reissued in Canada and elsewhere however. Not until 2010 would the complete original Frankie and Johnny soundtrack be widely available in the United States again.

=== Follow That Dream ===
In 2003 Frankie and Johnny was reissued on the Follow That Dream label in a special edition that contained the original album tracks along with numerous alternate takes.

== Track listing ==
=== Original release ===
Side one
No.	Title	Writer(s)	Recording date	Length
1.	"Frankie and Johnny"	Alex Gottlieb, Fred Karger, Ben Weisman	May 14, 1965	2:32
2.	"Come Along"	David Hess	May 12, 1965	1:52
3.	"Petunia, the Gardener's Daughter"	Roy C. Bennett and Sid Tepper	May 14, 1965	2:59
4.	"Chesay"	Ben Weisman, Sid Wayne, Fred Karger	May 14, 1965	1:39
5.	"What Every Woman Lives For"	Doc Pomus, Mort Shuman	May 13, 1965	2:27
6.	"Look Out, Broadway"	Fred Wise, Randy Starr	May 14, 1965	1:40

Side two
No.	Title	Writer(s)	Recording date	Length
1.	"Beginner's Luck"	Roy C. Bennett and Sid Tepper	May 12, 1965	2:34
2.	"Down by the Riverside" and "When the Saints Go Marching In"	Bernie Baum, Bill Giant, Florence Kaye	May 12, 1965	1:56
3.	"Shout It Out"	Bernie Baum, Bill Giant, Florence Kaye	May 13, 1965	2:17
4.	"Hard Luck"	Ben Weisman and Sid Wayne	May 13, 1965	2:51
5.	"Please Don't Stop Loving Me"	Joy Byers	May 13, 1965	2:02
6.	"Everybody Come Aboard"	Bernie Baum, Bill Giant, Florence Kaye	May 14, 1965	1:51

Note

- "Frankie and Johnny" was released as a single (RCA 8780) in March 1966 and appeared on Billboard's Hot 100 list for eight weeks. Its highest position was number 25. The single's B-side, "Please Don't Stop Loving Me", also charted for eight weeks and reached number 45.

=== Pickwick reissue ===
Side one
No.	Title	Length
1.	"Frankie and Johnny"	2:32
2.	"Come Along"	1:52
3.	"What Every Woman Lives For"	2:27
4.	"Hard Luck"	2:51
5.	"Please Don't Stop Loving Me"	2:02

Side two
No.	Title	Length
1.	"Down by the Riverside" and "When the Saints Go Marching In"	1:56
2.	"Petunia, the Gardener's Daughter"	2:59
3.	"Beginner's Luck"	2:34
4.	"Shout It Out"	2:17

Note

- "Chesay", "Look Out, Broadway", and "Everybody Come Aboard" were not included in the reissue.

=== Follow That Dream reissue ===
Original album
No.	Title	Length
1.	"Frankie and Johnny"	2:32
2.	"Come Along"	1:50
3.	"Petunia, the Gardener's Daughter"	2:58
4.	"Chesay"	1:36
5.	"What Every Woman Lives For"	2:25
6.	"Look Out, Broadway"	1:38
7.	"Beginner's Luck"	2:25
8.	"Down by the Riverside" / "When the Saints Go Marching In"	1:54
9.	"Shout It Out"	2:15
10.	"Hard Luck"	2:50
11.	"Please Don't Stop Loving Me"	2:25
12.	"Everybody Come Aboard"	1:49

Alternate takes
No.	Title	Length
13.	"Frankie and Johnny" (take 1)	2:55
14.	"Please Don't Stop Loving Me" (take 10)	2:13
15.	"Everybody Come Aboard" (takes 1 & 2)	2:42
16.	"Chesay" (take 1)	1:58
17.	"Petunia, the Gardeners Daughter" (take 2)	2:53
18.	"Look Out, Broadway" (takes 3, 4, 5)	2:22
19.	"Please Don't Stop Loving Me" (takes 1, 2, 3)	3:00
20.	"Shout It Out" (takes 1, 2, 3)	3:31
21.	"Everybody Come Aboard" (takes 9, 10)	2:09
22.	"Chesay" (takes 3 & 6)	3:16
23.	"Look Out, Broadway" (takes 6, 7, 8)	2:13
24.	"Petunia, The Gardeners Daughter" (take 5)	3:23
25.	"Please Don't Stop Loving Me" (take 7)	2:10
26.	"Frankie and Johnny" (takes 3 & 4 [record version])	2:45
27.	"Frankie and Johnny" (movie version)	7:01

== Personnel ==
- Elvis Presley – vocals
- The Jordanaires – backing vocals
- Eileen Wilson – vocals
- George Worth – trumpet
- Richard Noel – trombone
- John Johnson – tuba
- Gus Bivona – saxophone
- Scotty Moore – electric guitar
- Tiny Timbrell – acoustic guitar
- Charlie McCoy – guitar, harmonica on "Hard Luck”
- Larry Muhoberac – piano
- Bob Moore – double bass
- D. J. Fontana – drums
- Buddy Harman – drums

== Charts ==
=== Album ===
Year	Chart	Position
1966	Billboard Pop Albums	20

=== Certifications and sales ===
Region	Certification	Certified units/sales
United States (RIAA) Pickwick release	Platinum	1,000,000^{^}
^{^} Shipments figures based on certification alone.
