= Fun in Acapulco (soundtrack) =

Soundtrack album by Elvis Presley
- Released: November 15, 1963
- Recorded: January 22–23, February 27, and May 26 and 28, 1963
- Studio: Radio Recorders (Hollywood); RCA Studio B (Nashville)
- Genre: Mexican music, pop
- Length: 29:30
- Label: RCA Victor
- Producer: Joseph Lilley

Elvis Presley chronology
Elvis' Golden Records Volume 3 (1963)	Fun in Acapulco (1963)	Kissin' Cousins (1964)

Singles from Fun in Acapulco
- 1. "Bossa Nova Baby" Released: October 1, 1963

Professional ratings
Review scores
Source	Rating
Allmusic	2.5/5 stars

Fun in Acapulco is the seventh soundtrack album by American singer and musician Elvis Presley, released on RCA Victor Records in mono and stereo, LPM/LSP 2756, in November 1963. It is the soundtrack to the 1963 film of the same name starring Presley. Recording sessions took place at Radio Recorders in Hollywood on January 22 and 23 and February 27, 1963; and at RCA Studio B in Nashville, Tennessee, on May 26 and 28, 1963. It peaked at number three on the Billboard Top Pop Albums chart.

== Content ==
The third of his tropical "travelogue films" for Paramount Pictures (after Blue Hawaii and Girls! Girls! Girls!) finds Elvis frolicking in Mexico. The established stable of songwriters for Presley delivered songs to match, with titles like "Marguerita", "El Toro", "You Can't Say No In Acapulco", and "The Bullfighter Was A Lady". Included as well was the 1937 standard "Guadalajara" by Pepe Guízar. With the change from the normal routine, and with the addition of brass arrangements inspired by the contemporaneously popular sound of Herb Alpert and the Tijuana Brass, Presley engaged the material with greater enthusiasm than on recent soundtrack outings. Four of these songs would be included on the 1995 compilation Command Performances: The Essential 60s Masters II: the title track, "Mexico", "Marguerita", and the song released as the lead single, "Bossa Nova Baby".

"Bossa Nova Baby" arrived in stores one month prior to the soundtrack, coupled with the track "Witchcraft" by rhythm and blues songwriter and arranger Dave Bartholomew and a hit for the Spiders in 1956. The fact that the bossa nova craze of the 1960s was a Brazilian phenomenon rather than a Mexican one mattered little, as the single peaked at number 8 on the Billboard Hot 100 as well as reaching as high as the 20th spot on the R&B singles chart.

== Recording ==
The main sessions for the Fun in Acapulco soundtrack were held between January 22 and 23, 1963, at Radio Recorders Studio B in Hollywood, California. These were preceded by a full day of rehearsals on January 21 as well as a half-day on January 22. Aside from Presley's bandmates Scotty Moore and D. J. Fontana as well as The Jordanaires, no members of the Nashville A-Team joined him. Instead, the core band featured frequent Hollywood collaborators Hilmer J. "Tiny" Timbrell on acoustic guitar and mandolin and Dudley Brooks on piano, Wrecking Crew members Hal Blaine on drums and jazz guitarist Barney Kessel, LA session bassist Ray Siegel, Anthony Terran and Rudolf Loera on trumpets and Emil Radocchia on percussion. In addition to the Jordanaires, another vocal group, the Amigos (with whom Elvis had previously worked on "We'll Be Together" for the Girls! Girls! Girls! soundtrack), provided backing vocals.

One song, "Guadalajara", was not done live in the studio as standard practice of the time, but instead recorded as a track on January 23, with Presley overdubbing his vocals at a later date. He recorded his vocals on February 27, 1963, again at Radio Recorders Studio B. The final master was a splice between vocal overdub takes 6 and 2.

Several tracks were recorded but not included on the album. Another Latin standard, "Malaguena" by Ernesto Lecuona from 1933, was slated for the picture, with new English lyrics penned by Don Robertson. Like "Guadalajara", this was recorded as a track on January 23 with the intent that Presley would overdub his vocals at a later date, and got as far as having acetates cut with a splice between takes 6 and 10. At one point, guide vocals by the Amigos using Lecuona's original lyrics were recorded; these are not known to survive on tape. However, the song was rejected at a late stage and the track lay abandoned. In addition, two more versions of "Vino, Dinero Y Amor" were recorded by the Amigos for the film on January 22, without Elvis participating. Finally, an instrumental version of "Mexico" was recorded on January 22 as a lead-in for its segment in the film.

The two bonus songs, "Love Me Tonight" and "Slowly But Surely", were recorded as part of a group of non-soundtrack sessions held at RCA Studio B in Nashville, Tennessee between May 26 and 28, 1963.

According to the original tape box for the stereo album masters, the album was mixed and assembled on October 1, 1963.

== Release history ==
Initially Fun in Acapulco was not intended for release as a long-playing album, for on January 24, 1963, Presley's manager Colonel Tom Parker announced to RCA Victor that he would not allow its release, expressing concern over its viability in a downsized market. This was in response to the short ten-track It Happened at the World's Fair soundtrack album released the previous year. Parker reaffirmed this in a letter to RCA executive Bill Bullock on January 29, where he also expressed that there was too much pressure on RCA Victor's part to have soundtracks available for the RCA Record Club. In the end Parker acquiesced, and allowed RCA Victor to release the soundtrack, but insisted on making Fun in Acapulco a good value album. To this end, two additional tracks, "Love Me Tonight" and "Slowly But Surely" were pulled from the aborted album sessions of May 1963, and added here to bring the running order up to thirteen tracks. This procedure of pulling material from non-soundtrack sessions to fill out soundtracks that ran short would be repeated for the remainder of Presley's film career, and was a major contributing factor to a dearth of non-soundtrack albums until the release of How Great Thou Art three years later.

No clear release date for Fun in Acapulco is known. Traditionally it has been given a date of November 1, 1963; however, unearthed paperwork dated October 7, 1963, has shown that RCA Victor slated the album's release for December 1963, with copies being shipped out to record dealers from November 15 onward.

Fun in Acapulco has seen many reissues over the years in various formats. The vinyl was reissued with a new registry (AFL1-2756) in 1977. In 1993 Fun in Acapulco was released on CD for the first time, as a "Double Feature" with the It Happened at the World's Fair soundtrack, although it lacked the two bonus songs. On January 26, 2010, a single-disc version of the original soundtrack remastered by Vic Anesini was released as part of events marking the 75th anniversary of Presley's birth; this time it contained the bonus songs. On March 18, 2016, a new remaster, again by Anesini, was released as part of The RCA Albums Collection box set.

Throughout the years many outtakes have come out on various releases (discounting bootlegs). Vocal Overdub, Take 2 of "Guadalajara" (the ending from which was used on the final master) was released in 1978 on Elvis: A Legendary Performer Volume 3. Take 2 of "Bossa Nova Baby" was released in 1997 as part of the box set Platinum: A Life in Music. Take 7 of "Mexico" (an alternate master with Elvis singing additional lyrics) was released in 1999 on the official fan club label, Follow That Dream Records, as part of the compilation Out in Hollywood. Take 2 of "Mexico" was released in 2002 as part of the box set Today, Tomorrow and Forever. Takes 4 and 5 of "Bossa Nova Baby", take 15 of the remake version of "I Think I'm Gonna Like It Here", take 1 of "Vino, Dinero Y Amor" and Take 10 of the remake version of "The Bullfighter Was a Lady" were released in 2015 on the Follow That Dream label "Classic Album" reissue of Elvis for Everyone!.

Fun in Acapulco was reissued on the Follow That Dream label in April 2003, this time containing the original album, the outtakes released up to that point, and numerous other unreleased takes.

In March 2019, Fun in Acapulco was re-released once again on the Follow That Dream label as a limited edition three-CD set entitled The Fun in Acapulco Sessions, containing a 28-page booklet and a new remaster of the original stereo album master tapes, as well as the virtually complete sessions including the masters remixed from scratch from the original three-track session reels by Vic Anesini and Sebastian Jeansson. This also saw the first official release of the non-Elvis material recorded for the soundtrack.

== Track listing ==
The song "Kaun Hai Jo Sapnon Mein Aaya" from the 1968 film Jhuk Gaya Aasman was a copy of "Marguerita".

=== Original release ===
Side one
No.	Title	Writer(s)	Recording date	Length
1.	"Fun in Acapulco"	Ben Weisman and Sid Wayne	January 23, 1963	2:30
2.	"Vino, Dinero Y Amor"	Sid Tepper and Roy C. Bennett	January 22, 1963	1:55
3.	"Mexico"	Sid Tepper and Roy C. Bennett	January 22, 1963	1:59
4.	"El Toro"	Bill Giant, Bernie Baum, Florence Kaye	January 23, 1963	2:42
5.	"Marguerita"	Don Robertson	January 22, 1963	2:42
6.	"The Bullfighter Was a Lady"	Sid Tepper and Roy C. Bennett	January 22, 1963	2:04
7.	"(There's) No Room to Rhumba in a Sports Car"	Fred Wise and Dick Manning	January 23, 1963	1:53
Total length:				15:59

Side two
No.	Title	Writer(s)	Recording date	Length
8.	"I Think I'm Gonna Like It Here"	Don Robertson and Hal Blair	January 22, 1963	2:53
9.	"Bossa Nova Baby"	Jerry Leiber and Mike Stoller	January 22, 1963	2:02
10.	"You Can't Say No in Acapulco"	Sid Feller, Dolores Fuller, Lee Morris	January 23, 1963	1:55
11.	"Guadalajara"	Pepe Guízar	January 23 and February 27, 1963	2:43
12.	"Love Me Tonight" (bonus song)	Don Robertson	May 26, 1963	2:00
13.	"Slowly But Surely" (bonus song)	Ben Weisman and Sid Wayne	May 28, 1963	2:12
Total length:				14:01

=== 2003 Follow That Dream reissue ===
No.	Title	Length
1.	"Fun in Acapulco"	2:29
2.	"Vino, Dinero Y Amor"	1:53
3.	"Mexico"	1:58
4.	"El Toro"	2:41
5.	"Marguerita"	2:39
6.	"The Bullfighter Was a Lady"	2:02
7.	"(There's) No Room to Rhumba in a Sports Car"	1:52
8.	"I Think I'm Gonna Like It Here"	2:51
9.	"Bossa Nova Baby"	2:02
10.	"You Can't Say No in Acapulco"	1:54
11.	"Guadalajara"	2:43
12.	"Love Me Tonight"	2:00
13.	"Slowly But Surely"	2:14
14.	"Mexico" (take 7)	1:58

No.	Title	Length
15.	"The Bullfighter Was a Lady" (remake take 17)	2:01
16.	"I Think I’m Gonna Like It Here" (remake takes 18, 19)	2:35
17.	"Bossa Nova Baby" (takes 1, 2)	2:53
18.	"The Bullfighter Was a Lady" (takes 4, 5, 6)	3:52
19.	"Marguerita" (take 6)	2:51
20.	"I Think I'm Gonna Like It Here" (take 1)	2:51
21.	"Mexico" (takes 1, 2)	2:41
22.	"You Can't Say No in Acapulco" (takes 1, 2, 3, 4)	3:11
23.	"Guadalajara" (take 2)	2:27
24.	"Bossa Nova Baby" (take 3)	2:48
25.	"Mexico" (take 6)	2:10
26.	"I Think I'm Gonna Like It Here" (takes 11, 12, 13-remake)	3:54
27.	"Guadalajara" (takes 3, 4)	2:55
Total length:		1:08:25

=== The Fun in Acapulco Sessions ===
==== Disc 1 ====
Side one
No.	Title	Writer(s)	Recording date	Length
1.	"Fun in Acapulco"	Ben Weisman and Sid Wayne	January 23, 1963	2:52
2.	"Vino, Dinero Y Amor"	Sid Tepper and Roy C. Bennett	January 22, 1963	1:56
3.	"Mexico"	Sid Tepper and Roy C. Bennett	January 22, 1963	2:01
4.	"El Toro"	Bill Giant, Bernie Baum and Florence Kaye	January 23, 1963	2:44
5.	"Marguerita"	Don Robertson	January 22, 1963	2:43
6.	"The Bullfighter Was a Lady"	Sid Tepper and Roy C. Bennett	January 22, 1963	2:05
7.	"(There's) No Room to Rhumba in a Sports Car"	Fred Wise and Dick Manning	January 23, 1963	1:56

Side two
No.	Title	Writer(s)	Recording date	Length
8.	"I Think I'm Gonna Like It Here"	Don Robertson and Hal Blair	January 22, 1963	2:53
9.	"Bossa Nova Baby"	Jerry Leiber and Mike Stoller	January 22, 1963	2:04
10.	"You Can't Say No in Acapulco"	Sid Feller, Dolores Fuller and Lee Morris	January 23, 1963	1:57
11.	"Guadalajara"	Pepe Guízar	January 23 and February 27, 1963	2:45
12.	"Love Me Tonight" (bonus song)	Don Robertson	May 26, 1963	2:02
13.	"Slowly But Surely" (bonus song)	Ben Weisman and Sid Wayne	May 28, 1963	2:18

Outtakes
No.	Title	Writer(s)	Recording date	Length
14.	"Bossa Nova Baby" (takes 1–2)	Jerry Leiber and Mike Stoller	January 22, 1963	2:58
15.	"Bossa Nova Baby" (take 3)	Jerry Leiber and Mike Stoller	January 22, 1963	2:36
16.	"Bossa Nova Baby" (takes 4–5)	Jerry Leiber and Mike Stoller	January 22, 1963	2:30
17.	"Bossa Nova Baby" (take 6)	Jerry Leiber and Mike Stoller	January 22, 1963	2:23
18.	"Bossa Nova Baby" (takes 7–8)	Jerry Leiber and Mike Stoller	January 22, 1963	3:02
19.	"Bossa Nova Baby" (take 9)	Jerry Leiber and Mike Stoller	January 22, 1963	2:28
20.	"Bossa Nova Baby" (takes 10 & 11/M)	Jerry Leiber and Mike Stoller	January 22, 1963	3:14
21.	"I Think I'm Gonna Like It Here" (take 1)	Don Robertson and Hal Blair	January 22, 1963	3:01
22.	"I Think I'm Gonna Like It Here" (takes 2–5)	Don Robertson and Hal Blair	January 22, 1963	4:31
23.	"I Think I'm Gonna Like It Here" (takes 6–7)	Don Robertson and Hal Blair	January 22, 1963	3:25
24.	"I Think I'm Gonna Like It Here" (takes 8–9)	Don Robertson and Hal Blair	January 22, 1963	4:03
25.	"I Think I'm Gonna Like It Here" (splice of take 10 and one line from take 7/M, record version)	Don Robertson and Hal Blair	January 22, 1963	3:06
26.	"Mexico" (takes 1–2)	Sid Tepper and Roy C. Bennett	January 22, 1963	2:44
27.	"Mexico" (takes 3–4)	Sid Tepper and Roy C. Bennett	January 22, 1963	3:17
28.	"Mexico" (take 5/M)	Sid Tepper and Roy C. Bennett	January 22, 1963	2:11
Total length:				1:15:34

==== Disc 2 ====
Outtakes
No.	Title	Writer(s)	Recording date	Length
1.	"Mexico" (take 6)	Sid Tepper and Roy C. Bennett	January 22, 1963	2:12
2.	"Mexico" (take 7/alternate M)	Sid Tepper and Roy C. Bennett	January 22, 1963	2:09
3.	"Mexico" (instrumental, takes 1–2 & 3/M)	Sid Tepper and Roy C. Bennett	January 22, 1963	1:23
4.	"The Bullfighter Was a Lady" (takes 1–3)	Sid Tepper and Roy C. Bennett	January 22, 1963	4:32
5.	"The Bullfighter Was a Lady" (takes 4–6)	Sid Tepper and Roy C. Bennett	January 22, 1963	3:58
6.	"The Bullfighter Was a Lady" (take 7)	Sid Tepper and Roy C. Bennett	January 22, 1963	2:13
7.	"The Bullfighter Was a Lady" (takes 8–9)	Sid Tepper and Roy C. Bennett	January 22, 1963	2:37
8.	"The Bullfighter Was a Lady" (splice of takes 9 & 7/M, record version)	Sid Tepper and Roy C. Bennett	January 22, 1963	2:05
9.	"Marguerita" (take 1)	Don Robertson	January 22, 1963	2:59
10.	"Marguerita" (takes 2–6)	Don Robertson	January 22, 1963	7:12
11.	"Marguerita" (takes 7 & 8/M)	Don Robertson	January 22, 1963	3:28
12.	"Vino, Dinero Y Amor" (take 1)	Sid Tepper and Roy C. Bennett	January 22, 1963	2:20
13.	"Vino, Dinero Y Amor" (takes 2–3)	Sid Tepper and Roy C. Bennett	January 22, 1963	2:34
14.	"Vino, Dinero Y Amor" (take 4)	Sid Tepper and Roy C. Bennett	January 22, 1963	2:17
15.	"Vino, Dinero Y Amor" (take 5/M)	Sid Tepper and Roy C. Bennett	January 22, 1963	2:23
16.	"Vino, Dinero Y Amor" (The Amigos, café version take 1)	Sid Tepper and Roy C. Bennett	January 22, 1963	1:19
17.	"Vino, Dinero Y Amor" (The Amigos, café version take 2)	Sid Tepper and Roy C. Bennett	January 22, 1963	1:16
18.	"Vino, Dinero Y Amor" (The Amigos, café version take 3)	Sid Tepper and Roy C. Bennett	January 22, 1963	1:17
19.	"Vino, Dinero Y Amor" (The Amigos, café version take 4)	Sid Tepper and Roy C. Bennett	January 22, 1963	1:18
20.	"Vino, Dinero Y Amor" (The Amigos, boat version takes 1–2 & 3/M)	Sid Tepper and Roy C. Bennett	January 22, 1963	2:32
21.	"(There's) No Room to Rhumba in a Sports Car" (take 1/M)	Fred Wise and Dick Manning	January 23, 1963	2:05
22.	"Fun in Acapulco" (take 1/M)	Ben Weisman and Sid Wayne	January 23, 1963	2:40
23.	"El Toro" (take 1)	Bill Giant, Bernie Baum and Florence Kaye	January 23, 1963	3:31
24.	"El Toro" (take 2)	Bill Giant, Bernie Baum and Florence Kaye	January 23, 1963	1:08
25.	"El Toro" (splice of takes 2 & 1/M)	Bill Giant, Bernie Baum and Florence Kaye	January 23, 1963	2:44
26.	"I Think I'm Gonna Like It Here" (takes 11–13)	Don Robertson and Hal Blair	January 23, 1963	4:03
27.	"I Think I'm Gonna Like It Here" (takes 14–15)	Don Robertson and Hal Blair	January 23, 1963	3:58
28.	"I Think I'm Gonna Like It Here" (takes 16–18)	Don Robertson and Hal Blair	January 23, 1963	3:47
29.	"I Think I'm Gonna Like It Here" (take 19)	Don Robertson and Hal Blair	January 23, 1963	3:08
Total length:				1:19:15

==== Disc 3 ====
Outtakes
No.	Title	Writer(s)	Recording date	Length
1.	"I Think I'm Gonna Like It Here" (splice of takes 19 & 18/M, movie version)	Don Robertson and Hal Blair	January 23, 1963	2:31
2.	"The Bullfighter Was a Lady" (take 10)	Sid Tepper and Roy C. Bennett	January 23, 1963	2:16
3.	"The Bullfighter Was a Lady" (takes 11–14)	Sid Tepper and Roy C. Bennett	January 23, 1963	4:12
4.	"The Bullfighter Was a Lady" (takes 15–16)	Sid Tepper and Roy C. Bennett	January 23, 1963	1:42
5.	"The Bullfighter Was a Lady" (take 17/M, movie version)	Sid Tepper and Roy C. Bennett	January 23, 1963	2:08
6.	"Malaguena" (track, take 1)	Ernesto Lecuona, Don Robertson	January 23, 1963	3:31
7.	"Malaguena" (track, takes 2–10)	Ernesto Lecuona, Don Robertson	January 23, 1963	8:34
8.	"Malaguena" (track, splice of takes 6 & 10/M)	Ernesto Lecuona, Don Robertson	January 23, 1963	3:12
9.	"You Can't Say No in Acapulco" (takes 1–4)	Sid Feller, Dolores Fuller and Lee Morris	January 23, 1963	3:20
10.	"You Can't Say No in Acapulco" (take 5/M)	Sid Feller, Dolores Fuller and Lee Morris	January 23, 1963	2:07
11.	"Guadalajara" (track, takes 1–2)	Pepe Guízar	January 23, 1963	3:42
12.	"Guadalajara" (track, takes 3–4)	Pepe Guízar	January 23, 1963	2:23
13.	"Guadalajara" (track, take 5)	Pepe Guízar	January 23, 1963	2:56
14.	"Guadalajara" (track, takes 6–7)	Pepe Guízar	January 23, 1963	1:28
15.	"Guadalajara" (track, splice of takes 1, 5 & 7/M)	Pepe Guízar	January 23, 1963	3:03
16.	"Guadalajara" (v.o. takes 1–2)	Pepe Guízar	February 27, 1963	4:35
17.	"Guadalajara" (v.o. takes 3–4)	Pepe Guízar	February 27, 1963	3:14
18.	"Guadalajara" (v.o. takes 5–6)	Pepe Guízar	February 27, 1963	3:44
19.	"Guadalajara" (v.o. takes 7–10)	Pepe Guízar	February 27, 1963	5:26
20.	"Guadalajara" (v.o. splice of takes 6 & 2/M)	Pepe Guízar	February 27, 1963	2:47
Total length:				1:06:58

== Personnel ==
(Per)

Musicians

January 22–23, February 27, 1963

- Elvis Presley – lead vocals
- The Jordanaires – backing vocals
- The Amigos – backing vocals
- Scotty Moore – electric guitar
- Barney Kessel – acoustic guitar
- Tiny Timbrell – acoustic guitar, mandolin
- Ray Siegel – double bass
- Dudley Brooks – piano
- D. J. Fontana – drums
- Hal Blaine – drums
- Emil Radocchi – percussion
- Tony Terran – trumpet
- Rudolph Loera – trumpet

May 26–28, 1963

- Elvis Presley – lead vocals
- The Jordanaires – backing vocals
- Millie Kirkham – backing vocals
- Scotty Moore – electric guitar
- Thomas "Grady" Martin – electric guitar ("Love Me Tonight")
- Harold Bradley – electric guitar
- Jerry Kennedy – electric guitar ("Slowly But Surely")
- Floyd Cramer – piano
- Bob Moore – double bass
- D. J. Fontana – drums
- Buddy Harman – drums
- Homer "Boots" Randolph – saxophone

Production

- Joseph Lilley – producer, musical director (January 22–23 and February 27)
- Steve Sholes – producer (May 26–28)
- Dave Wiechman – engineer, mixer (January 22–23 and February 27)
- Jerry H. – recording engineer (January 22–23 and February 27)
- Bill Porter – engineer, mixer (May 26–28)

The Fun in Acapulco Sessions reissue credits

- Ernst Mikael Jørgensen – reissue producer, art direction
- Roger Semon – reissue producer, art direction
- Vic Anesini – mixing
- Sebastian Jeansson – mixing, audio restoration, mastering
- Jimmy Carpenter – art restoration, scans, layout

== Charts ==
=== Album ===
Year	Chart	Position
1963	Billboard Pop Albums	3

=== Single ===
US release date	Record number		Song titles	Highest chart position		
US release date	US	UK	Song titles	US Hot	US R&B	UK
October 1963	RCA 47-8243	RCA 1374	"Bossa Nova Baby" b/w "Witchcraft" (not part of soundtrack)	8; 37	20 —	13 —
