= Bossa Nova Baby =

1963 single by Elvis Presley

Single by Elvis Presley

from the album Fun in Acapulco
- B-side: "Witchcraft"
- Released: October 1, 1963
- Recorded: January 22, 1963
- Studio: Radio Recorders, Hollywood
- Genre: Rock and roll, bossa nova
- Length: 2:02
- Label: RCA Victor
- Songwriters: Jerry Leiber, Mike Stoller
- Producer: Joseph Lilley

Elvis Presley singles chronology
"(You're the) Devil in Disguise" (1963)	"Bossa Nova Baby" / "Witchcraft" (1963)	"Kissin' Cousins" / "It Hurts Me" (1964)

Music video
- "Bossa Nova Baby" (audio only) on YouTube

"Bossa Nova Baby" is a song written by Jerry Leiber and Mike Stoller and recorded by Elvis Presley on January 22, 1963, at Radio Recorders in Hollywood, California as part of the soundtrack of the 1963 motion picture Fun in Acapulco. The song peaked at No. 8 on the Billboard Hot 100 in 1963.

== Background ==
The song was written by the songwriting duo Jerry Leiber and Mike Stoller. The song was initially given to Tippie and the Clovers, who recorded and released the song on Leiber and Stoller own label Tiger Records in 1962. It was recorded with a samba rhythm and a Farfisa hook with an arrangement by Alan Lorber. However, this version flopped and did not chart. Elvis Presley recorded the song for the 1963 motion picture Fun in Acapulco, despite the song having little to do with Acapulco or bossa nova. The Elvis Presley version was in a rock and roll style with an organ riff, electric guitar and a mariachi band.

The song reached number eight on the Billboard Hot 100 pop chart and number 20 on the Billboard R&B Singles chart in 1963. It also reached number 13 in the UK charts. Elvis' recording appeared on the 1997 reissue of the 1968 compilation album Elvis' Gold Records Volume 4 as a bonus track. The Elvis RCA Victor recording appeared in the 2011 romantic comedy film No Strings Attached starring Natalie Portman and Ashton Kutcher. In 2010, a remix version was released on Viva Elvis: The Album.

== Personnel ==
- Elvis Presley – vocals
- The Jordanaires – backing vocals
- The Amigos – backing vocals
- Tony Terran – trumpet
- Rudolph Loera – trumpet
- Scotty Moore – electric guitar
- Barney Kessel – acoustic guitar
- Tiny Timbrell – acoustic guitar, mandolin
- Dudley Brooks – piano
- Ray Siegel – double bass
- Emil Radocchi – percussion
- D. J. Fontana – drums
- Hal Blaine – drums

== Charts ==
Chart (1963)	Peak position
Belgium (Ultratop 50 Flanders)	2
Belgium (Ultratop 50 Wallonia)	21
Netherlands (Single Top 100)	8
Norway (VG-lista)	2
UK Singles (OCC)	13
US Hot R&B/Hip-Hop Songs (Billboard)	20
US Billboard Hot 100	8
West Germany (GfK)	12
