= Follow That Dream (disambiguation) =

Follow That Dream may refer to:

- Follow That Dream, a 1961 film starring Elvis Presley
  - "Follow That Dream" (song), a song by Elvis Presley, the title song from the above-mentioned film
  - Follow That Dream (EP), an EP by Elvis Presley, containing songs from the above-mentioned film
- Follow That Dream Records, a record label specializing in Elvis Presley collector's reissues
- Follow That Dream (band), a Dutch pop band
