= Today, Tomorrow and Forever (Elvis Presley song) =

Song by Elvis Presley

from the EP Viva Las Vegas
- Songwriters: Bernie Baum, Florence Kaye, Franz Liszt, Bill Giant

"Today, Tomorrow and Forever" is a song written by Bernie Baum, Florence Kaye and Bill Giant and based on a classical piano piece titled "Liebestraum" by Franz Liszt. Elvis Presley performed the song in the 1964 MGM film Viva Las Vegas.

== Recording ==
Elvis Presley recorded the song in two versions, as a duet with Ann-Margret and as a solo. Only the solo recording was used in the film and issued on the accompanying soundtrack EP. A duet version can be heard on the 2002 Elvis Presley compilation album Elvis: Today, Tomorrow, and Forever, offering a selection of rarities from his whole career.

The solo version also appeared on an RCA Camden compilation of Presley's movie songs titled C'mon Everybody (1971).

According to the Elvis Presley official website, both the solo and the duet versions were recorded for the motion picture Viva Las Vegas on July 11, 1963, at Radio Recorders in Hollywood and featured Billy Strange, Scotty Moore and Tiny Timbrell on guitar, Bob Moore on bass, D.J. Fontana, Buddy Harman and Frank Carlson on drums, Floyd Cramer and Dudley Brooks on piano, Calvin Jackson on organ, Boots Randolph on saxophone, and the Jordanaires on vocals.

== Charts ==
Chart (1964)	Peak position
Canada Top 40	5
