= Speedway (soundtrack) =

Soundtrack album by Elvis Presley
- Released: June 25, 1968
- Recorded: May 1963, June–September 1967, January 1968
- Studio: MGM (Hollywood)
- Genres: Rock, pop
- Length: 28:26
- Label: RCA Victor
- Producer: Jeff Alexander

Elvis Presley chronology
Elvis' Gold Records Volume 4 (1968)	Speedway (1968)	Elvis Sings Flaming Star (1968)

Singles from Speedway
- 1. "Your Time Hasn't Come Yet, Baby / Let Yourself Go" Released: June 25, 1968

Professional ratings
Review scores
Source	Rating
Allmusic	1/5 stars

Speedway is the seventeenth and final soundtrack album by American singer and musician Elvis Presley, released by RCA Victor in mono and stereo, LPM/LSP 3989, on June 25, 1968. It serves as the soundtrack album for the 1968 film Speedway starring Presley. Recording sessions took place at Metro-Goldwyn-Mayer studios in Hollywood, California, on June 20 and 21, 1967. It peaked at number 82 on the Billboard 200.

Speedway took over the new low for chart position and album sales by Presley, selling fewer than 100,000 copies, and jeopardizing his recording career. Much to his relief, it killed the soundtrack formula, this being the final Presley dramatic feature film to have a full soundtrack album. His last five movies of the decade — Stay Away, Joe, Live a Little, Love a Little, Charro!, The Trouble with Girls, and Change of Habit — concentrated on Presley the actor, not Presley the singer, with minimal song requirements. It is also the last Presley album to be released in both stereo and mono editions as mono was being phased out by the industry, thus making the rare mono pressing of Speedway (LPM-3989) a sought-after item among collectors.

== Content ==
Eight tracks for Speedway were recorded at the sessions, with "Suppose", the only song that held interest for Elvis, dropped from the movie. Two tracks were pulled for a single, "Your Time Hasn't Come Yet Baby" with "Let Yourself Go" on its flipside, and both sides made the lower reaches of the Billboard Hot 100 (respectively numbers 72 and 71) but bombed sales-wise. "There Ain't Nothing Like A Song", rejected from the soundtrack for Spinout, was one of two songs that feature the lead vocals of Nancy Sinatra, here in duet with Presley. All her vocals, and her "Your Groovy Self", the only time a track without Elvis featured on any of his releases, were recorded at a separate session on June 26, produced by Lee Hazlewood. Three leftover tracks, including one from the May 1963 "lost album" sessions, were unearthed to round out the album.

== Reissues ==
Three songs from this album appear on Command Performances: The Essential 60s Masters II (1995): the two sides of the single and the title track. In 2016 Speedway was reissued on the Follow That Dream label in a special 2-disc edition that contained the original album tracks along with numerous alternate takes.

== Track listing ==
Side one
No.	Title	Writer(s)	Recording date	Length
1.	"Speedway"	Mel Glazer and Stephen Schlaks	June 20, 1967	2:10
2.	"There Ain't Nothing Like a Song" (duet with Nancy Sinatra)	Joy Byers, Bob Johnston	June 20, 1967	2:06
3.	"Your Time Hasn't Come Yet, Baby"	Joel Hirschhorn, Al Kasha	June 20, 1967	1:49
4.	"Who Are You (Who Am I)"	Ben Weisman, Sid Wayne	June 20, 1967	2:32
5.	"He's Your Uncle, Not Your Dad"	Ben Weisman, Sid Wayne	June 21, 1967	2:25
6.	"Let Yourself Go"	Joy Byers	June 21, 1967	2:56

Side two
No.	Title	Writer(s)	Recording date	Length
1.	"Your Groovy Self" (solo by Nancy Sinatra)	Lee Hazlewood	June 26, 1967	2:54
2.	"Five Sleepy Heads" (bonus track)	Roy C. Bennett, Sid Tepper	June 20, 1967	1:29
3.	"Western Union" (bonus track)	Roy C. Bennett, Sid Tepper	May 27, 1963	2:10
4.	"Mine" (bonus track)	Roy C. Bennett, Sid Tepper	September 10, 1967	2:36
5.	"Goin' Home" (bonus track, cut from Stay Away, Joe)	Joy Byers	January 15, 1968	2:23
6.	"Suppose" (bonus track, cut from film)	Sylvia Dee, George Goehring	June 20, 1967	2:01

== Personnel ==
Credits from Keith Flynn and Ernst Jorgensen's examination of session tapes and RCA and AFM paperwork.

- Elvis Presley − vocals
- The Jordanaires (Gordon Stoker, Neal Matthews, Hoyt Hawkins, Ray Walker) − backing vocals
- Millie Kirkham – backing vocals on "Mine"
- Tiny Timbrell − lead guitar
- Chip Young − electric guitar
- Scotty Moore — rhythm guitar on "Western Union", "Suppose", "Mine", and "Goin' Home"
- Jerry Kennedy – lead guitar on "Western Union"
- Tommy Tedesco − lead guitar on "He's Your Uncle, Not Your Dad" and "Let Yourself Go"
- Harold Bradley – guitar or six-string "tic-tac" electric bass on "Mine"
- Larry Muhoberac − piano
- Floyd Cramer – piano on "Mine"
- Charlie Hodge − piano (on "Suppose")
- Hoyt Hawkins – organ on "Mine"
- Bob Moore − double bass, electric bass
- D. J. Fontana − drums
- Buddy Harman − drums
- Boots Randolph − saxophone
- Charlie McCoy − trumpet; guitar or harmonica on "Mine"
- Tony Terran − trumpet (uncertain)
- Pete Drake − pedal steel guitar

Production staff

- Jeffrey Alexander – producer
- Felton Jarvis – producer ("Mine")
- Aaron Rochin – engineer
- Lyle Burbridge – engineer
- Jim Malloy – engineer ("Mine")

June 26, 1967 session ("Your Groovy Self" by Nancy Sinatra only):

- Nancy Sinatra − vocals
- Billy Strange − electric guitar
- Donald Owens − electric guitar
- Donnie Lanier − electric guitar
- Al Casey − electric guitar
- Larry Knechtel − piano
- Don Randi − piano
- Chuck Berghofer − bass
- Hal Blaine − drums
- Roy Caton − trumpet
- Virgil Evans − trumpet
- Oliver Mitchell − trumpet
- Dick Hyde − trombone

== Charts ==
Chart (1968)	Peak position
Billboard Pop Albums	82
