= Today, Tomorrow, and Forever =

Today, Tomorrow, and Forever may refer to:

- "Today, Tomorrow and Forever" (Elvis Presley song), a song by Elvis Presley from the 1964 film Viva Las Vegas
- Today, Tomorrow, and Forever (Elvis Presley album), a 2002 compilation album
- Today, Tomorrow, and Forever (Patsy Cline album), a 1985 compilation album
  - "Today, Tomorrow and Forever" (Patsy Cline song), a 1957 single

== See also ==
- Today, Tomorrow, Forever (disambiguation)
