= Mexico (Elvis Presley song) =

Single by Elvis Presley

from the album Fun in Acapulco
- A-side: "Mexico" "You Can't Say No in Acapulco"
- Released: 1963
- Recorded: January 22, 1963
- Studio: Radio Recorders, Hollywood
- Label: RCA
- Songwriter(s): Sid Tepper; Roy C. Bennett

"Mexico" is a song written by Sid Tepper and Roy C. Bennett and originally recorded by Elvis Presley for the 1963 Paramount picture Fun in Acapulco. It also appeared on the soundtrack album for the movie.

Released as a single (with "You Can't Say No in Acapulco" on the opposite side) outside the United States, it reached number 23 in West Germany in 1964.

== Composition ==
The song was written by Sid Tepper and Roy C. Bennett.

== Recording ==
Elvis Presley recorded the song for the film Fun in Acapulco on January 22, 1963, at Radio Recorders in Hollywood. The recording sessions featured Barney Kessel and Scotty Moore on guitar, Tiny Timbrell on guitar and mandolin, Ray Siegel on bass, D. J. Fontana and Hal Blaine on drums, Emil Radocchia on percussion, Dudley Brooks on piano, Tony Terran and Rudolph Loera on trumpet. Additional vocals were provided by the Jordanaires and the Amigos.

== Track listing ==
7-inch single RCA Victor 47-9508, Germany, 1963)
No.	Title	Artist	Length
1.	"Mexico"	Elvis Presley	1:59
2.	"You Can't Say No in Acapulco"	Elvis Presley with the Jordanaires	1:53

== Charts ==
Chart (1964)	Peak position
Belgium (Ultratop 50 Flanders)	7
Belgium (Ultratop 50 Wallonia)	48
Netherlands (Single Top 100)	9
Norway (VG-lista)	7
West Germany (GfK)	23
