= The Islanders (American band) =

- Origin: United States
- Labels: Mayflower Records
- Past members: Frank Metis; Randy Starr; Ralph F. Curtiss

The Islanders were an American instrumental duo, which included Frank Metis (accordion) and Randy Starr (guitar), in addition to using special sound effects by Ralph F. Curtiss.

== Career ==
They are most noted for their 1959 hit single, "The Enchanted Sea", which reached number 15 on the Billboard Hot 100 chart.

None of their subsequent singles for Mayflower were successful. An LP The Enchanted Sound of The Islanders was released by Mayflower Records in 1960. An independent, limited edition CD was produced in 2016 with the 12 songs from the original LP in stereo, plus a bonus track, "Forbidden Island" in mono on the Scion imprint.

Randy Starr, whose original name was Warren Nadel (born July 2, 1930, Bronx, New York) was a guitar-playing, songwriting dentist. He also performed as a solo singer for a number of record labels, as well as penning songs for other artists, including "Kissin' Cousins" with Fred Wise, for Elvis Presley.

== The Enchanted Sound of The Islanders ==
=== Side A ===
- "Autumn Leaves"
- "The Breeze and I"
- "Blue Rain"
- "Tramp Steamer"
- "Sleepy Lagoon"
- "Paradise Lost"

=== Side B ===
- "The Enchanted Sea"
- "Kon-Tiki"
- "Dreamer"
- "Tornado"
- "Blue Tango"
- "City under the Sea"
