= Today, Tomorrow, and Forever (Elvis Presley album) =

Today, Tomorrow and Forever

Box set by Elvis Presley
- Released: June 25, 2002
- Recorded: July 6, 1954 – February 5, 1976
- Genre: Rock and roll
- Length: 4:28:07
- Label: RCA

Elvis Presley chronology
Live in Las Vegas (2001)	Today, Tomorrow and Forever (2002)	Elvis: Close Up (2003)

Today, Tomorrow, and Forever is a 2002 Elvis Presley compilation album released by RCA Records. The album features songs from the early years of Presley on Sun Records to his movie career, ’68 Comeback Special, Gospel, Vegas and later years. As indicated on the packaging, none of the tracks in this four-CD set had ever been released previously, as all tracks featured were either alternate studio takes or previously unreleased live performances. The title track of the collection is a (then-)recently discovered outtake from the soundtrack recording sessions for Viva Las Vegas featuring Presley in duet with Ann-Margret.

== Track listing ==
Disc one
No.	Title	Writer(s)	Length
1.	"Harbor Lights" (alt. take 3)	Jimmy Kennedy, Hugh Williams	2:28
2.	"I Got a Woman" (alt. take)	Ray Charles, Renald Richard	1:30
3.	"Shake, Rattle and Roll" (alt. take 2)	Charles E. Calhoun	3:08
4.	"I Want You, I Need You, I Love You" (alt. take 13)	Maurice Mysels, Ira Kosloff	2:42
5.	"Heartbreak Hotel" (live Little Rock AR, May 16, 1956)	Mae Boren Axton, Tommy Durden, Elvis Presley	2:33
6.	"Long Tall Sally" (live, May 16, 1956)	Robert Blackwell, Enotris Johnson, Richard Penniman	2:09
7.	"I Was the One" (live, May 16, 1956)	Hal Blair, Claude Demetrius, Bill Peppers, Aaron Schroeder	3:13
8.	"Money Honey" (live, May 16, 1956)	Jesse Stone	2:20
9.	"I Got a Woman" (live, May 16, 1956)	Ray Charles, Renald Richard	3:28
10.	"Blue Suede Shoes" (live, May 16, 1956)	Carl Perkins	4:00
11.	"Hound Dog" (live, May 16, 1956)	Jerry Leiber, Mike Stoller	2:45
12.	"Rip It Up" (alt. take 14)	Robert Blackwell, John Marascalco	2:01
13.	"Don't Forbid Me" / "You Belong to My Heart" (Million Dollar Quartet, December 4, 1956)	Charles Singleton / Ray Gilbert, Agustín Lara	1:52
14.	"I Beg of You" (alt. take 5)	Rose Marie McCoy	1:53
15.	"(There'll Be) Peace In The Valley (For Me)" (alt. take 1)	Thomas A. Dorsey	3:23
16.	"Is It So Strange" (alt. take 10)	Faron Young	2:33
17.	"Got a Lot O' Livin' to Do" (Movie Master Take 17)	Aaron Schroeder, Ben Weisman	1:54
18.	"Loving You" (fast version/alt. take 6)	Jerry Leiber, Mike Stoller	1:45
19.	"Treat Me Nice" (alt. take 6)	Leiber, Stoller	2:06
20.	"Young and Beautiful" (alt. takes 4 & 5)	Aaron Schroeder, Abner Silver	2:51
21.	"I Want to Be Free" (alt. takes 3 & 4)	Leiber, Stoller	2:00
22.	"Steadfast, Loyal and True" (undubbed master)	Leiber, Stoller	1:14
23.	"Doncha' Think It's Time" (alt. take 48)	Luther Dixon, Clyde Otis	1:56
24.	"I Need Your Love Tonight" (alt. take 4)	Bix Reichner, Sid Wayne	2:00
25.	"I Got Stung" (alt. take 16)	David Hill, Aaron Schroeder	1:47
26.	"The Fool" (alt. take 1)	Naomi Ford	1:54
Total length:			1:01:25

Disc two
No.	Title	Writer(s)	Length
1.	"Make Me Know It" (alt. takes 17-18)	Otis Blackwell	2:40
2.	"Are You Lonesome Tonight?" (alt. takes 1 & 2)	Lou Handman, Roy Turk	3:37
3.	"G.I. Blues" (alt. take 5)	Roy C. Bennett, Sid Tepper	2:49
4.	"Pocketful of Rainbows" (alt. take 3)	Ben Weisman, Fred Wise	2:59
5.	"Flaming Star" (alt. takes 4 & 1)	Sherman Edwards, Donald Meyer, Sid Wayne	3:26
6.	"Swing Down Sweet Chariot" (alt. takes 2 & 3)	Traditional	3:13
7.	"Lonely Man" (solo/alt. take 1)	Bennie Benjamin, Sol Marcus	2:01
8.	"There's Always Me" (alt. take 2)	Don Robertson	2:33
9.	"Can't Help Falling in Love" (alt. take 26)	Luigi Creatore, Hugo Peretti, George David Weiss	1:49
10.	"I'm Yours" (alt. take 5)	Hal Blair, Don Robertson	2:14
11.	"Follow That Dream" (alt. take 3)	Ben Weisman, Fred Wise	1:40
12.	"Anything That's Part of You" (alt take 8)	Don Robertson	2:07
13.	"King of the Whole Wide World" (alt. take 3)	Ruth Batchelor, Don Robertson	3:41
14.	"Gonna Get Back Home Somehow" (alt. take 2)	Doc Pomus, Mort Shuman	2:43
15.	"A Boy Like Me, a Girl Like You" (alt. take 4)	Roy Bennett, Sid Tepper	2:25
16.	"They Remind Me Too Much of You" (Take 4)	Don Robertson, Leith Stevens	2:30
17.	"Mexico" (alt. take 2)	Roy Bennett, Joseph Lilley, Sid Tepper	1:59
18.	"Witchcraft" (alt. take 2)	Dave Bartholomew, Pearl King	2:20
19.	"Today, Tomorrow and Forever" (with Ann-Margret) (alt. take 2)	Bernie Baum, Buddy Kaye	4:09
20.	"Ask Me" (alt. take 2)	Bernie Baum, Bill Giant, Buddy Kaye, Domenico Modugno	2:14
21.	"Roustabout" (alt. take 8)	Bernie Baum, Bill Giant, Florence Kaye	2:03
22.	"Puppet on a String" (alt. take 10)	Roy Bennett, Sid Tepper	2:39
23.	"My Desert Serenade" (alt. take 7)	Stanley Gelber	2:07
24.	"Please Don't Stop Loving Me" (alt. take 10)	Joy Byers	2:05
25.	"This Is My Heaven" (alt. take 7)	Bernie Baum, Bill Giant, Buddy Kaye	2:38
26.	"Never Say Yes" (alt. takes 1 & 2)	Doc Pomus, Mort Shuman	2:35
27.	"Hide Thou Me" (home recording)	Lou Baxter	5:01
Total length:			1:12:17

Disc three
No.	Title	Writer(s)	Length
1.	"Love Letters" (alt. take 2)	Edward Heyman, Victor Young	2:51
2.	"If the Lord Wasn't Walking by My Side" (alt. take 4)	Henry Slaughter	1:52
3.	"Come What May" (alt. takes 3 & 4)	Franklin Tableporter	2:19
4.	"Indescribably Blue" (alt. take 1)	Darrell Glenn	2:47
5.	"Long Legged Girl" (alt. master)	John Leslie McFarland, Winfield Scott	1:37
6.	"The Love Machine" (alt. take 3)	Fred Burch, Gerald Nelson, Chuck Taylor	2:42
7.	"You Don't Know Me" (movie version take 3)	Eddy Arnold, Cindy Walker	2:14
8.	"Big Boss Man" (alt. take 9)	Luther Dixon, Al Smith	2:53
9.	"We Call on Him" (alt. take 8)	Fred Karger, Sid Wayne, Ben Weisman	2:32
10.	"Stay Away" (alt. take 14)	Roy Bennett, Sid Tepper	2:26
11.	"U.S. Male" (alt. take 7)	Jerry Reed	2:58
12.	"Wonderful World" (alt. take 15)	Doug Flett	2:26
13.	"Trouble" / "Guitar Man" (68 Special) (alt. take 1)	Jerry Leiber and Mike Stoller / Jerry Reed	3:43
14.	"Where Could I Go But to the Lord" (68 Special) (alt. take 4)	James B. Coats	1:57
15.	"Memories" (68 Special) (stereo master)	Mac Davis, Billy Strange	3:06
16.	"Almost" (alt. take 6)	Buddy Kaye, Ben Weisman	1:51
17.	"In the Ghetto" (alt. take 20)	Mac Davis	3:06
18.	"True Love Travels on a Gravel Road" (alt. take 2)	Dallas Frazier, A.L. Owens	2:27
19.	"Let Us Pray" (alternate master)	Buddy Kaye, Ben Weisman	3:07
20.	"Baby What You Want Me to Do" (live, August 22, 1969, midnight show)	Jimmy Reed	2:27
21.	"Funny How Time Slips Away" (live, August 22, 1969, midnight show)	Willie Nelson	2:41
22.	"Runaway" (live, August 22, 1969, midnight show)	Max Crook, Del Shannon	2:07
23.	"My Babe" (live, August 22, 1969, midnight show)	Willie Dixon	2:00
24.	"What'd I Say" (live, August 22, 1969, midnight show)	Ray Charles	3:17
Total length:			1:01:26

Disc four
No.	Title	Writer(s)	Length
1.	"See See Rider" (live, February 19, 1970, dinner show)	Traditional	2:38
2.	"Polk Salad Annie" (live, February 17, 1970, midnight show)	Tony Joe White	4:30
3.	"Walk a Mile in My Shoes" (live, February 17, 1970, midnight show)	Joe South	2:49
4.	"The Next Step Is Love" (alt. take 6)	Paul Evans, Paul Parnes	3:40
5.	"Life" (alt. take 2)	Shirl Milete	3:15
6.	"Snowbird" (alt. take 2)	Gene MacLellan	2:08
7.	"That's What You Get for Lovin' Me" (alt. takes 9 & 10)	Gordon Lightfoot	2:52
8.	"Until It's Time for You to Go" (alt. take 5)	Buffy Sainte-Marie	4:20
9.	"Fools Rush In (Where Angels Fear to Tread)" (alt. take 9)	Rube Bloom, Johnny Mercer	2:43
10.	"A Thing Called Love" (rehearsal)	Jerry Reed	2:56
11.	"I'll Be Home on Christmas Day" (alt. take 9)	Michael Jarrett	4:21
12.	"Where Do I Go from Here" (alt. take 5)	Paul Williams	1:54
13.	"No More" (Aloha from Hawaii) (alt. take 1)	Hal Blair, Don Robertson	2:32
14.	"Take Good Care of Her" (alt. take 3)	Arthur Kent, [Edward C. Warren	3:33
15.	"I Miss You" (alt. take 1)	Donnie Sumner	2:13
16.	"I Got a Feelin' in My Body" (alt. take 4)	Dennis Linde	3:34
17.	"If You Talk in Your Sleep" (alt. take 5)	Johnny Christopher, Red West	2:26
18.	"Promised Land" (alt. take 2)	Chuck Berry	2:33
19.	"Your Love's Been a Long Time Coming" (alt. take 10)	Rory Bourke, Carmol Taylor, Norris Taylor	3:51
20.	"Pieces of My Life" (alt. take 1)	Troy Seals	3:44
21.	"For the Heart" (alt. take 4)	Dennis Linde	4:03
22.	"She Thinks I Still Care" (alt. take 10)	Dickey Lee, Steve Duffy	4:17
23.	"Hurt" (alt. take 5)	Jimmie Crane, Al Jacobs	2:07
Total length:			1:12:59

== Chart performance ==
Chart (2002)	Peak position
US Billboard 200	180
US Top Country Albums (Billboard)	21

=== Year-end charts ===
Chart (2002)	Position
Canadian Country Albums (Nielsen SoundScan)	90
