= Fun in Acapulco (song) =

Song by Elvis Presley

from the album Fun in Acapulco
- Released: 1963
- Recorded: January 23, 1963
- Studio: Radio Recorders, Hollywood
- Length: 2:30
- Label: RCA Victor
- Composer(s): Ben Weisman
- Lyricist(s): Sid Wayne

"Fun in Acapulco" is a song written by Ben Weisman and Sid Wayne and first recorded by Elvis Presley as part of the soundtrack for his 1963 motion picture Fun in Acapulco. It was released on the eponymous soundtrack album in 1963.

In some countries, the song was also released on a single or on an eponymous EP.

The Australian Kent Music Report (calculated in retrospect using archival data) lists the song "Fun in Acapulco" for 15 weeks, with the peak of 28 on the week of February 22, 1964.

== Writing and recording ==
The song was written by Sid Wayne (lyrics) and Ben Weisman (music).

Elvis Presley recorded it on January 23, 1963, during the soundtrack sessions for the Paramount movie Fun in Acapulco at the Radio Recorders studio in Hollywood.

== Track listings ==
7-inch single (Victor SS - 1413, Japan, February 1964)

1. "Fun In Acapulco" (2:28)
2. "Marguerita" (2:39)

7-inch single (RCA 101551, Australia, 1964)

1. "Fun In Acapulco" (2:30)
2. "I Think I'm Gonna Like It Here" (2:51)

7-inch EP (RCA Victor EPA - 9106, Germany, 1964)

1. "Fun In Acapulco"
2. "(There's) No Room To Rhumba In A Sports Car"
3. "I Think I'm Gonna Like It Here"
4. "Mexico"

== Charts ==
| Chart (1963–1964) | Peak position |
|---|---|
| Australia (retrospect Kent Music Report) | 28 |
