= Your Time Hasn't Come Yet, Baby =

Single by Elvis Presley

from the album Speedway
- A-side: "Your Time Hasn't Come Yet, Baby" "Let Yourself Go"
- Released: May 21, 1968
- Length: 1:49
- Label: RCA Victor
- Songwriters: Joel Hirschhorn; Al Kasha

Elvis Presley singles chronology
"We Call on Him" / "You'll Never Walk Alone" (1968)	"Your Time Hasn't Come Yet, Baby" / "Let Yourself Go" (1968)	"Almost in Love" / "A Little Less Conversation" (1968)

"Your Time Hasn't Come Yet, Baby" is a song written by Joel Hirschhorn and Al Kasha and recorded by Elvis Presley for the 1968 motion picture Speedway. It was sung by Presley in the movie and also appeared on its soundtrack album.

The song was originally released on May 21, 1968, as a single (with "Let Yourself Go" on the opposite side) from the upcoming movie due in theaters June 12.

The song peaked at number 72 on the Billboard Hot 100 for the week of July 13.

== Recording ==
The song was recorded on June 20, 1967, at MGM Studios in Hollywood. Additional vocals were provided by the Jordanaires and Nancy Sinatra.

== Track listing ==
7" single (RCA Victor 47-9547, 1968)
No.	Title	Writer(s)	Artist	Length
1.	"Your Time Hasn't Come Yet, Baby"	Joel Hirschhorn, Al Kasha	Elvis Presley with the Jordanaires	1:49
2.	"Let Yourself Go"		Elvis Presley with the Jordanaires	2:56

== Charts ==
Chart (1968)	Peak position
UK Singles (OCC)	22
US Billboard Hot 100	72
US Hot Country Songs (Billboard)	50
"Your Time Hasn't Come Yet, Baby" / "Let Yourself Go"
Australia (retrospect Kent Music Report)	19
