= Speedway (song) =

Song by Elvis Presley

from the album Speedway
- Released: 1968
- Recorded: June 20, 1967
- Length: 2:10
- Songwriters: Mel Glazer; Stephen Schlaks

"Speedway" is a song first recorded by Elvis Presley as part of the soundtrack for his 1968 motion picture Speedway.

Its first release on record was in 1968 on the soundtrack album Speedway.

== Writing and recording ==
The song was written by Mel Glazer and Stephen Schlaks.

Presley recorded it on June 20, 1967, at the soundtrack recordings for the MGM movie Speedway (that took place June 20–21, 1967 at the MGM Studios in Hollywood, California.)
