= Kissin' Cousins (song) =

1964 single by Elvis Presley and the Jordanaires

Single by Elvis Presley and the Jordanaires

from the album Kissin' Cousins
- A-side: "Kissin' Cousins"; "It Hurts Me"
- Released: February 10, 1964
- Recorded: 1963
- Genre: Rock and roll, pop
- Length: 2:14
- Label: RCA Victor
- Songwriters: Fred Wise; Randy Starr
- Producer: Chet Atkins

Elvis Presley singles chronology
"Bossa Nova Baby" / "Witchcraft" (1963)	"Kissin' Cousins" / "It Hurts Me'" (1964)	"Viva Las Vegas" / "What'd I Say" (1964)

Professional ratings
Review scores
Source	Rating
Billboard	Favorable

"Kissin' Cousins" is a song first recorded by Elvis Presley as the title track for the soundtrack of the 1964 motion picture Kissin' Cousins. The movie also featured a completely different song, titled "Kissin' Cousins (No. 2)", written by Bill Giant, Bernie Baum and Florence Kaye.

== Writing and recording ==
The song was written by Fred Wise and Randy Starr. The song was published by Elvis Presley's company Gladys Music, Inc. Elvis Presley recorded his vocals for the song over an earlier-recorded backing track on October 10 (or possibly in the early morning of October 11), 1963.

== Release history ==
The single was first released as a single on February 10, 1964, with "It Hurts Me", a non-movie song, on the opposite side as RCA Victor 47–8307."Kissin' Cousins" peaked at number 12 on the Billboard Hot 100. ("It Hurts Me" also charted, peaking at number 29.)

The song's first LP release was in March 1964 on the Kissing Cousins soundtrack LP (LPM-2894 in mono and LSP-2894 in stereo). On March 27, 1992, the single "Kissin' Cousins / It Hurts Me" was certified Gold by the RIAA for selling over 500,000 copies.

== Critical reception ==
Reviewing the single "Kissin' Cousins / It Hurts Me" in its February 15, 1964, issue, Billboard called the two songs "[t]wo more contenders for chart honors from Elvis."

First side is from forthcoming film and features good middle tempo rock with voices and guitars in support.

== Charts ==
Chart (1964)	Peak position
"Kissin' Cousins"
Belgium (Ultratop 50 Flanders)	12
Belgium (Ultratop 50 Wallonia)	33
Germany	27
Norway (VG-lista)	6
UK (Official Charts Company)	10
U.S. Billboard Hot 100	12
U.S. Cash Box Top 100	10
"Kissin' Cousins / It Hurts Me"
Australia (retrospect Kent Music Report)	7
