= Let Yourself Go (Elvis Presley song) =

Single by Elvis Presley

from the album Speedway
- B-side: "Your Time Hasn't Come Yet, Baby"
- Released: May 21, 1968
- Recorded: June 21, 1967
- Studio: MGM Studios, Hollywood
- Length: 2:56
- Label: RCA Victor
- Songwriter: Joy Byers (words and music)

Elvis Presley singles chronology
"We Call on Him" / "You'll Never Walk Alone" (1968)	"Your Time Hasn't Come Yet, Baby" / "Let Yourself Go" (1968)	"Almost in Love" / "A Little Less Conversation" (1968)

"Let Yourself Go" is a song first recorded by Elvis Presley as part of the soundtrack for his 1968 motion picture Speedway.

In June 1968 it was released on a single with "Your Time Hasn't Come Yet, Baby" on the other side and on the soundtrack album Speedway.

On December 1, 1970, the single "Let Yourself Go" / "Your Time Hasn't Come Yet, Baby" was re-released as part of RCA Victor's Gold Standard Series (together with 9 other Presley's singles).

== Writing and recording history ==
The song was written by Joy Byers.

Presley recorded it on June 21, 1967, at the soundtrack recordings for the MGM movie Speedway (that took place June 20–21, 1967, at the MGM Studios in Hollywood, California). Another version of the song was recorded for the 1968 Comeback Special and was subsequently released on A Legendary Performer Volume 3).

== Track listings ==
7" single (RCA 47–9547, 1968)

1. Let Yourself Go
2. Your Time Hasn't Come Yet, Baby

7" single

1. Your Time Hasn't Come Yet, Baby
2. Let Yourself Go

== Charts ==
Chart (1968)	Peak position
Belgium (Ultratip Bubbling Under Wallonia)	–
U.S. Billboard Hot 100	71
"Your Time Hasn't Come Yet, Baby" / "Let Yourself Go"
Australia (retrospect Kent Music Report)	19
