= Today, Tomorrow, Forever =

Today, Tomorrow, Forever may refer to:

- Today, Tomorrow, Forever (Nancy Wilson album)
- Today, Tomorrow, Forever (Corey Paul album)

== See also ==
- Today, Tomorrow, and Forever (disambiguation)
