= I'm Not the Marrying Kind =

Song by Elvis Presley
- Released: 1962
- Recorded: July 2, 1961
- Studio: RCA's Studio B, Nashville
- Label: RCA
- Songwriter(s): Mack David, Sherman Edwards

"I'm Not the Marrying Kind" is a song written by Mack David and Sherman Edwards and originally recorded by Elvis Presley for the 1961 United Artists motion picture Follow That Dream.

The song was featured on the soundtrack EP for the movie released on the label RCA Victor in April 1962 and made it into the top 10 in South Africa.

Nine years later, the song appeared on an RCA Camden compilation of Presley's movie songs titled C'mon Everybody (1971).

== Composition ==
The song was written by Mack David and Sherman Edwards.

== Recording ==
Elvis Presley recorded the song for the film Follow That Dream on July 2, 1961, at RCA's Studio B in Nashville. According to the Elvis Presley official website, the recording session featured Hank Garland, Scotty Moore and Neal Matthews on guitar, Bob Moore on bass, Buddy Harman and D.J. Fontana on drums, Floyd Cramer on piano and organ, Boots Randolph on saxophone, Millie Kirkham and The Jordanaires on vocals.
