= Roustabout (Elvis Presley song) =

Promotional single by Elvis Presley
- Released: 1964
- Recorded: April 29, 1964
- Studio: Radio Recorders, Hollywood
- Length: 1:57
- Label: RCA
- Songwriters: Bernie Baum, Bill Giant, Florence Kaye

Audio
- "Roustabout" on YouTube

"Roustabout" is a song written by Bernie Baum, Bill Giant and Florence Kaye for Elvis Presley and the 1964 Paramount picture Roustabout. The song also appeared on the soundtrack album for the movie.

== Composition ==
The song written by Bernie Baum, Bill Giant and Florence Kaye was chosen as a last-minute replacement for the song written as the title track for the movie Roustabout by Otis Blackwell and Winfield Scott.

Mike Eder describes "Roustabout" as "geeky, with abysmal lyrics and a generic backing". On the other hand, the song originally intended as the title track was, in his opinion, "a respectable rocker" and a surpringly "great song for the period".

The Elvis Presley official website recounts:

It was only after the completion of the picture that Hal Wallis nixed the already recorded Otis Blackwell–Winfield Scott title track for what he deemed its "risqué" lyrics, but the always efficient team of Giant/Baum/Kaye jumped right in and delivered a new one. The soundtrack was better integrated than some but of no higher quality, and there was no song strong enough to be released as a single.

(In fact, the song "Roustabout" was released as a promotional single in the US and as a commercial single in the Philippines, backed with "Little Egypt".)

== Recording ==
According to the Elvis Presley official website, the backing track was recorded on April 29, 1964, at Radio Recorders, Hollywood. The session featured Billy Strange and Tiny Timbrell on guitar, Ray Siegel on bass, Hal Blaine and Bernie Mattinson on drums, Dudley Brooks on piano and The Mello Men on vocals. Presley recorded his vocals on May 14, 1964.

According to Mike Eder's Elvis Music FAQ, the song was recorded on March 3, 1964.

== Track listing ==
7" promo single (RCA Victor SP-45-139, 1964)
No.	Title	Writer(s)	Length
1.	"Roustabout"	Bernie Baum, Bill Giant, Florence Kaye	1:57
2.	"One Track Heart"	Bernie Baum, Bill Giant, Florence Kaye	2:15

== Charts ==
Chart (1965)	Peak position
Belgium (Ultratip Bubbling Under Wallonia)	–
