= Please Don't Stop Loving Me (Elvis Presley song) =

Single by Elvis Presley

from the album Frankie and Johnny
- A-side: "Frankie and Johnny"
- Released: 1966
- Recorded: May 13, 1965
- Genre: Rock and Roll, Pop
- Length: 2:02
- Label: RCA Victor
- Songwriter: Joy Byers

Elvis Presley singles chronology
"Tell Me Why" / "Blue River" (1966)	"Please Don't Stop Loving Me" (1966)	"Love Letters" (1966)

"Please Don't Stop Loving Me" is a song first recorded by Elvis Presley as part of the soundtrack for his 1966 motion picture Frankie and Johnny.

It was also in 1966 released as the B-side to "Frankie and Johnny", the title song of the same movie. Both songs charted on the Billboard Hot 100. "Please Don't Stop Loving Me'" peaked in it at number 45 on the week of April 23, 1966.

The song also reached the top 10 in Israel.

== Musical style and lyrics ==
The song was published by Elvis Presley Music, Inc.

According to the book Elvis Films FAQ, "Please Don't Stop Loving Me" was influenced by the song "Non ho l'età (Per amarti)" ("I'm Too Young to Love You"), with which Gigliola Cinquetti won the Eurovision Song Contest in 1964. The book states that "although the chorus is completely different in "Please Don't Stop Loving Me," the similarity between the melody and the verses is striking".

== Charts ==
Chart (1966)	Peak position
US Billboard Hot 100	45
