= We Call on Him =

"We Call On Him"

Single by Elvis Presley
- Language: English
- B-side: "You'll Never Walk Alone"
- Published: Gladys Music
- Released: March 26, 1968
- Recorded: September 11, 1967
- Studio: RCA Studio B, Nashville
- Genre: Gospel
- Length: 2:31
- Label: RCA Victor
- Songwriters: Fred Karger, Sid Wayne, Ben Weisman

Elvis Presley singles chronology
"U.S. Male" / "Stay Away" (1968)	"We Call on Him" / "You'll Never Walk Alone" (1968)	"Let Yourself Go" / "Your Time Hasn't Come Yet, Baby" (1968)

We Call On Him is a song by Elvis Presley. Elvis Presley recorded the gospel song in 1967. The song was published by Gladys Music, Elvis Presley's publishing company. The song was written by Fred Karger, Sid Wayne, and Ben Weisman.

The song reached No. 106 on the U.S. Billboard Bubbling Under chart.

The single was backed with "You'll Never Walk Alone", which also became a chart hit and surpassed "We Call on Him". It reached No. 90 on the U.S. Billboard Hot 100 in 1968.
