= Follow That Dream (EP) =

EP (soundtrack) by Elvis Presley
- Released: April 1962
- Recorded: July 2, 1961
- Studio: RCA Studio B (Nashville)
- Genre: Pop
- Length: 8:36
- Label: RCA Victor
- Producer: Hans Salter

Elvis Presley chronology
Blue Hawaii (1961)	Follow That Dream (1962)	Pot Luck (1962)

Follow That Dream is an EP by American singer Elvis Presley, containing four songs from the motion picture of the same name. The EP was released by RCA Victor in April 1962.

It was simultaneously certified Gold and Platinum by the Recording Industry Association of America on March 27, 1992.

== Recording and release history ==
Recording sessions took place on July 2, 1961, at RCA Studio B in Nashville, Tennessee. Six songs were recorded for the film, and a distressed Presley insisted that the worst song, "Sound Advice," be omitted from release when it came time to assemble a soundtrack. "Sound Advice" would be placed on the compilation Elvis for Everyone, and a sixth soundtrack song, "A Whistling Tune," would be saved for the next film Kid Galahad, the version recorded at these sessions later released on Collectors Gold in 1991. Presley sang a few lines of "On Top of Old Smokey" in the film, but the recording was made on the movie set. The issue of quality would continue to be a sore point in his soundtrack material for the remainder of his film career.

Issued as an extended play record, the Follow That Dream soundtrack EP was released in April 1962 to coincide with the film's premiere. The record sold very well, especially for an EP in the Sixties. The title song received Top 40 radio airplay and reached No. 15 on the Billboard Hot 100 singles chart. It became a platinum record. The extended play record was the number-one EP in the UK for 20 weeks.

== Track listing ==
Side one
No.	Title	Writer(s)	Recording date	Length
1.	"Follow That Dream"	Fred Wise and Ben Weisman	July 2, 1961	1:39
2.	"Angel"	Roy C. Bennett and Sid Tepper	July 2, 1961	2:39

Side two
No.	Title	Writer(s)	Recording date	Length
1.	"What a Wonderful Life"	Sid Wayne and Jerry Livingston	July 2, 1961	2:27
2.	"I'm Not the Marrying Kind"	Sherman Edwards and Mack David	July 2, 1961	1:51

== Personnel ==
- Elvis Presley – vocals
- The Jordanaires – backing vocals
- Millie Kirkham – backing vocals
- Boots Randolph – saxophone
- Scotty Moore, Hank Garland – electric guitar
- Neal Matthews Jr. – acoustic guitar
- Bob Moore – double bass
- Floyd Cramer – piano
- D.J. Fontana, Buddy Harman – drums

== Charts ==
"Follow That Dream" (song)
Chart (1962)	Peak position
UK Singles (Official Charts)	34
U.S. Billboard Easy Listening	5
U.S. Billboard Hot 100	15
