= Randy Starr =

American dentist and singer-songwriter (born 1930)

- Born: Warren Nadel; July 2, 1930 (age 95); United States
- Genres: Pop, rock
- Occupations: Songwriter, musician, dentist
- Labels: Mayflower Records, Dale Records

Randy Starr (born Warren Nadel, July 2, 1930) is an American dentist and singer-songwriter known for writing twelve songs for Elvis Presley.

== Early life ==
Starr was educated at Columbia University, where he took his undergraduate degree from Columbia College in 1951, and his DDS degree from Columbia College of Dental Medicine in 1954.

== Career ==
During the 1950s, Starr was a member of the American band The Islanders, whose "The Enchanted Sea" was the fifteenth most popular hit in 1959. Starr appeared on television on several occasions. On August 21, 1957, he performed his hit song "After School" in one of his five appearances on American Bandstand. He appeared as himself on the September 10, 1962 CBS game show To Tell the Truth.

Starr wrote songs that were recorded by Jackie Wilson, The Kingston Trio, Teresa Brewer, Nelson Riddle, Chet Atkins, Kay Starr, and Connie Francis.

Starr is retired and lives in New York City.

== Presley songs ==
During the 1960s, Starr wrote twelve songs that were recorded by Elvis Presley.

- "Kissin' Cousins" was written with Fred Wise and was featured in the 1964 film Kissin' Cousins.
- "The Yellow Rose of Texas" was written with Fred Wise and was featured in the 1964 film Viva Las Vegas.
- "Carny Town" was written with Fred Wise and was featured in the 1964 film Roustabout.
- "Look Out Broadway" was written with Fred Wise and was featured in the 1966 film Frankie and Johnny.
- "Datin'" was written with Fred Wise and was featured in the 1966 film Paradise, Hawaiian Style.
- "Adam and Evil" was written with Fred Wise and was featured in the 1966 film Spinout.
- "Could I Fall In Love" and "Old MacDonald" were featured in the 1967 film Double Trouble.
- "Who Needs Money" and "The Girl I Never Loved" were featured in the 1967 film Clambake.
- "Almost in Love" was written with Luiz Bonfá and was featured in the 1968 film Live a Little, Love a Little.
- "I've Got News for You" was written with Fred Wise and was featured in the 1965 Elvis Presley film Girl Happy, sung by Shelley Fabares and Nita Talbot.
