= Kissin' Cousins =

1964 film by Gene Nelson

- Theatrical release poster
- Directed by: Gene Nelson
- Screenplay by: Gerald Drayson Adams; Gene Nelson
- Story by: Gerald Drayson Adams
- Produced by: Sam Katzman
- Starring: Elvis Presley; Arthur O'Connell; Glenda Farrell; Jack Albertson; Pamela Austin; Cynthia Pepper; Yvonne Craig
- Cinematography: Ellis W. Carter
- Edited by: Ben Lewis
- Music by: Gene Nelson
- Production company: Four-Leaf Productions
- Distributed by: Metro-Goldwyn-Mayer
- Release date: March 6, 1964 (USA)
- Running time: 96 minutes
- Country: United States
- Language: English
- Box office: $3,000,000 (USA & Canada)

Kissin' Cousins is a 1964 American musical Panavision Metrocolor comedy film directed by Gene Nelson, and starring Elvis Presley. Written by Gerald Drayson Adams and Gene Nelson, and produced by Sam Katzman, the film features Presley in a dual role: Josh Morgan, a dark-haired Air Force officer, and Jodie Tatum, his blonde, look-alike distant cousin, a hillbilly who lives with his family in the Great Smoky Mountains of Tennessee.

== Plot ==
The U.S. Federal Government has run into a dead end trying to negotiate the lease of mountaintop land owned by Pappy Tatum, in the Great Smoky Mountains of Tennessee, for use as an ICBM missile base. U.S. Army General Alvin Donford gives Captain Robert Salbo seven days to secure the lease, or face permanent assignment to Greenland. After a quick computer search of military records, Salbo requests that U.S. Air Force pilot Second Lt. Josh Morgan, born elsewhere in the Great Smoky Mountains, be assigned as his number two. When they arrive in Tennessee with a small platoon, dark-haired Josh is surprised to meet his look-alike third cousin Jodie Tatum, a blond hillbilly.

Josh also meets his two beautiful country cousins, Azalea and Selena, who compete to win his affections. Josh eventually chooses Azalea and pairs off Selena with his friend, Master Sgt. William Bailey. Jodie, on the other hand, falls for Private Midge Riley, a beautiful but fiery soldier. There are also a group of 13 mountain maidens called the Kittyhawks who create havoc when they set their sights on the marriage-eligible soldiers.

Josh persuades Pappy Tatum to lease the mountaintop to the government for a monthly payment of $1,000 ($10,400 today) as long as an access road is built from the far side and the military provide security to prevent government employees from accessing Tatum's side – which will prevent "revenoors" from interfering with Pappy's moonshining.

== Cast ==
- Elvis Presley as Josh Morgan / Jodie Tatum (double role)
- Arthur O'Connell as Pappy Tatum
- Glenda Farrell as Ma Tatum
- Jack Albertson as Captain Robert Salbo
- Pamela Austin as Selena Tatum
- Cynthia Pepper as Midge (a WAC PFC)
- Yvonne Craig as Azalea Tatum
- Donald Woods as General Alvin Donford
- Tommy Farrell as Master Sgt. William George Bailey
- Beverly Powers as Trudy (a Kittyhawk)
- Hortense Petra as Dixie (a newspaper reporter)
- Robert Stone as General's Aide
- Teri Garr as one of The Kittyhawks (uncredited)

== Production, release and box office ==
While set in the Great Smoky Mountains, Kissin' Cousins was shot in the Los Angeles area, both on set at MGM Studios and outdoors in the San Bernardino Mountains east of Los Angeles; some filming took place in Big Bear Lake. The film was produced by Sam Katzman for Four-Leaf Productions, and was distributed in the United States by Metro-Goldwyn-Mayer. The film was released in the United States on March 6, 1964, and reached #11 on the Variety National Box Office Chart, earning $3 million, and finished at #26 on the year end list of the top-grossing movies of 1964. Presley's film, Viva Las Vegas, filmed during the summer of 1963 before Kissin Cousins, was released after Kissin' Cousins. Both Arthur O'Connell and Jack Albertson were cast alongside Presley, thus providing the film with 'double-barreled curmudgeons,' per Variety.

Sam Katzman produced an unsuccessful 1965 MGM Television television pilot starring Edd Byrnes for the NBC television network.

In December 1988, Kissin' Cousins made its home video debut. When it was reissued on VHS in 1997, the song "Smokey Mountain Boy" was deleted. It was later restored to the film when it made its DVD debut in 2007.

== Soundtrack ==
The song "Kissin' Cousins", which was performed as the movie's finale, reached #12 on the Billboard Hot 100 and was certified Gold by the RIAA. There are two different versions, or arrangements, of the song, both performed by Presley: one of which played over the opening and closing credits, and the other of which was performed by both Presley characters as a "duet" in the final scene.

== Reception ==
Howard Thompson of The New York Times wrote, "With the flavor of Fun in Acapulco—and that it was—fairly fresh, Elvis Presley's movie status takes a nosedive in his latest, Kissin' Cousins ... Sam Katzman's production is tired, strained and familiar stuff, even with double-barreled Presley."

Variety wrote, "This new Elvis Presley concoction is a pretty dreary effort, one that certainly won't replenish the popularity of Sir Swivel. Presley needs—and merits—more substantial material than this if his career is to continue to flourish as in the past." One of the review's primary criticisms was "the business of bursting into song out of context in the middle of a scene. This used to be reasonably acceptable to audiences, but now it is beginning to evolve into an anachronism."

Margaret Harford in the Los Angeles Times called the film "a frisky mixture of Seven Brides for Seven Brothers and Li'l Abner. You get your money's worth before monotony sets in as it does in nearly all the Presley pictures."

The Monthly Film Bulletin wrote,

"Presley films of only two or three years back set high standards of humour, characterisation and pictorial attractiveness. With its tired hillbilly jokes, dance routines reminiscent of Li'l Abner, over-acting and straggling plot, this is a poor successor to comedies like Follow That Dream. The effort into presenting Presley in two roles in the same shot, and even fighting 'himself', seems strangely wasted, so little importance does the similarity of Josh and Jodie have in the story."

=== Awards and nominations ===
Screenwriters Gene Nelson and Gerald Drayson Adams were nominated for the Writers Guild of America Award in the category of Best Written American Musical (won by Mary Poppins).

== See also ==
- List of American films of 1964
