= It Hurts Me =

- 1964 U.S. RCA Victor 45 picture sleeve, 47-8307

Single by Elvis Presley
- A-side: "Kissin' Cousins"
- Released: February 10, 1964
- Recorded: January 12, 1964
- Length: 2:27
- Label: RCA Victor
- Songwriter(s): Joy Byers; Charlie Daniels; Bob Johnston
- Producer(s): Elvis Presley (attributed to Chet Atkins)

Elvis Presley singles chronology
"Kissin' Cousins" (1964)	"It Hurts Me" (1964)	"Kiss Me Quick" (1964)

Professional ratings
Review scores
Source	Rating
Billboard	Favorable

"It Hurts Me" is a 1964 Top 40 song recorded by Elvis Presley on RCA Victor. Credited to Joy Byers and Charles E. Daniels, "It Hurts Me" is a ballad that was recorded by Elvis Presley on January 12, 1964. It was first released as a single by Elvis in February 1964.

== Background ==
This non-movie song was the B-side of the Elvis Presley movie single, "Kissin' Cousins", released February 10, 1964. The A-side reached number 12 in the U.S. singles charts, while "It Hurts Me" reached number 29 but never became well-known or attained "the classic stature promised by the song and the performance." The session that produced this recording marked the beginning of a 28-month period during which Presley recorded no other non-movie songs. Elvis recorded a new version on June 20, 1968, and used this song during the montage medley sequence of his 1968 NBC Comeback Special. The recording appeared on the 1968 RCA Victor compilation Elvis' Gold Records Volume 4.

The song is featured on the 2001 BMG/RCA compilation The 50 Greatest Love Songs. The song is featured in the 2004 jukebox musical All Shook Up. There is a notable Spanish version in the Latin genre by Marco Tulio Sanchez, Marco T, known as "the voice of rock and roll in Colombia". Johnny Hallyday, Ronnie McDowell, Tom Green, Ricky Norton, Teddy Rune, Kevin Löhr, Jerry Jackson, and Steven Pitman have also recorded the song.

== Composition ==
In the U.S. release, "Joy Byers" was credited as the songwriter. In the UK, the song was credited to Joy Byers and Charlie Daniels. The song was published by Elvis Presley Music, Inc. in the U.S. and by Sea Lark Music, Ltd. in the UK. Record producer and songwriter Bob Johnston revealed that he had actually written the songs attributed to his wife Joy Byers, including "It Hurts Me".

Before Christmas in 1962, as Charlie Daniels was driving from El Paso, Texas, to the East Coast, he began forming the idea that would become the song. Afterwards Bob Johnston invited him to Nashville to co-write songs. They finished the song together. Daniels recalled: "We just went on, and we finished it up, and Bob did a demo on it, and the company that he was writing for at the time---Hill and Range was the parent company---handled Elvis Presley Music and Gladys Music, which was Elvis Presley's two companies."

Daniels explained: "Elvis came to town. He picked it up and held it for almost a year in what was called his portfolio. You know, they'd pick songs out for Elvis and when he'd go in to record, he'd review them, and if he liked it, he'd do it. So anyway, he recorded it, and it was by far the biggest thing that had ever happened to me in my life." Although he never met Presley, Daniels did meet his daughter, Lisa Marie, at an event in Memphis: "I just got to tell her, I said, 'You know your dad picked one of my songs. I was a big fan.'"

== Sources ==
- Jorgensen, Ernst (1998). Elvis Presley: A life in music. The complete recording sessions. St. Martin's Press. ISBN 0-312-18572-3.
