= Fun in Acapulco =

1963 film by Richard Thorpe

- Theatrical release poster
- Directed by: Richard Thorpe
- Written by: Allan Weiss
- Produced by: Hal B. Wallis
- Starring: Elvis Presley; Ursula Andress; Elsa Cárdenas
- Cinematography: Daniel L. Fapp
- Edited by: Stanley E. Johnson
- Music by: Joseph J. Lilley
- Production company: Hal Wallis Productions
- Distributed by: Paramount Pictures
- Release date: November 27, 1963 (US)
- Running time: 97 minutes
- Country: United States
- Language: English
- Box office: $3,100,000 (US/ Canada)

Fun in Acapulco is a 1963 American musical comedy film directed by Richard Thorpe and starring Elvis Presley, Ursula Andress and Elsa Cárdenas.

The film featured the Top 10 Billboard hit "Bossa Nova Baby" and reached No. 1 on the national weekly box office charts a week after the assassination of President John F. Kennedy in Dallas, Texas. The film would be Presley's last release before the arrival of Beatlemania. It was the top-grossing movie musical of 1963.

== Plot ==
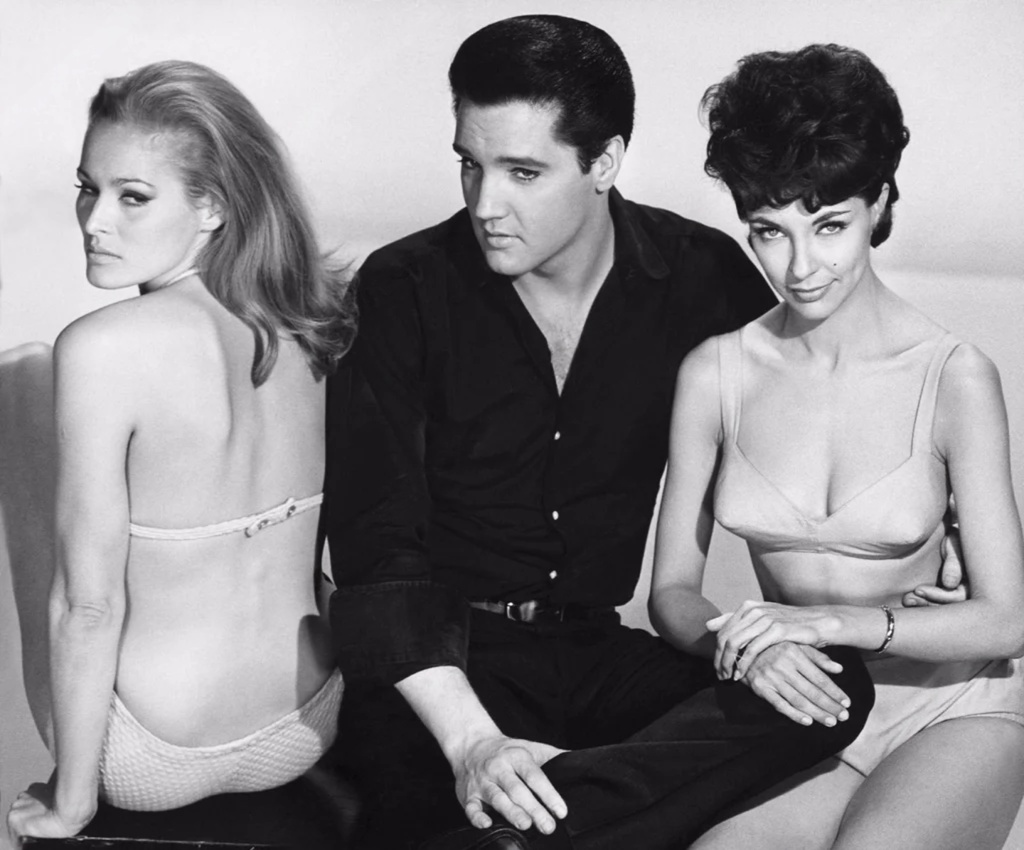
Elvis Presley with Ursula Andress and Elsa Cárdenas in a promotional picture of the film.

Mike Windgren works on a boat in Acapulco, Mexico. When Janie Harkins, the bratty daughter of the boat owner, gets him fired, Mike must find new work. A Mexican boy named Raoul helps him get a job as a lifeguard and singer at a local hotel. Clashes abound when Mike runs into a rival lifeguard, who is the champion diver of Mexico. He is angry at Mike for taking some of his hours, and for stealing his woman.

Mike is recovering from post-traumatic stress disorder and a fear of heights, following a tragic high-wire accident during his career as a circus performer. However, after Mike sees the lifeguard perform a number of dangerous dives, including flips and head-first dives into a section of the pool surrounded by a ring of fire, he decides to get even with him and eventually sets himself up to perform a death-defying dive off the 136-foot cliffs of La Quebrada in front of hundreds of people. Mike dives off the cliff, and successfully lands in the water, earning the lifeguard's respect.

As the crowd and the lifeguard applaud, Mike performs one more song and leaves with Margarita and Raoul.

== Cast ==
- Elvis Presley as Mike Windgren
- Ursula Andress as Margarita Dauphin
- Elsa Cárdenas as Dolores Gomez
- Paul Lukas as Maximilian Dauphin
- Larry Domasin as Raoul Almeido
- Alejandro Rey as Moreno
- Robert Carricart as Jose Garcia
- Teri Hope as Janie Harkins
- Genaro Gomez as Bullfighter
- Red West as Poolside Guest
- Teri Garr as a credited extra
- Tony Terran as trumpet player in the band

== Production ==
Exterior filming in Acapulco took place in January 1963. A stunt double was used for Presley, whose own shots were later completed in March at the Paramount studios in Los Angeles. Presley was unable to travel to Mexico as he had been declared persona non grata by local authorities following two violent riots at the trendy 'Las Americas' cinema in Mexico City, during the openings of his previous films King Creole (El barrio contra mí) in 1959, and G.I. Blues (Cafe Europa) in 1961.

In fact, the ban had actually started in 1957, when Excélsior, Mexico's foremost newspaper published an article by gossip columnist Federico de León that falsely stated Presley had been interviewed while visiting Tijuana, a place Presley never visited, before or after, where he had allegedly said that "he would not care to go sing in Mexico, as he found it a distasteful country and that he would in fact prefer to kiss three African Americans than a single Mexican woman." This led to a split in attitudes towards Presley among Mexican youth which became physically violent on several occasions. The King Creole riots saw 100 people jailed, but by the time of Fun in Acapulco′s release, Presley's records had been banned from airplay in 1957, his records publicly burnt in the El Zocalo town square that same year, and as stated above, his ban from stores enforced since 1959.

Decades later, it came to light that the false Presley quotes were the work of Ernesto Peralta Uruchurtu, a powerful politician and the Regent of Mexico City. Uruchurtu allegedly sent a blank check to Presley's Los Angeles offices in early 1957 in return for Presley's appearance at the 15th birthday bash of the daughter of a powerful media mogul on whose behalf he was acting. The invitation was not agreed upon, and the check was returned, despite the fact that the mogul had already began to boast publicly that Presley would appear at his daughter's birthday party. The story in "Excélsior" was then planted both as a form of revenge, and as a way of explaining why he did not come to Mexico to sing. These incidents were documented by Parménides García Saldaña in his book "Rey Criollo", and in Eric Zolov's book Refried Elvis: The Rise of the Mexican Counterculture.

== Reception ==
Howard Thompson of The New York Times wrote in a positive review that "this attractive travel poster for the famed Mexican resort is far and away [Presley's] best musical feature to date. It's a pleasant, idyllic movie that never takes itself seriously and moves briskly under Richard Thorpe's direction ... And Mr. Presley has never seemed so relaxed and personable." A middling review in Variety said, "Presley fans won't be disappointed—he sings ten serviceable songs and wiggles a bit to boot. However, the ground covered by the plot doesn't help to increase his star stature and, for those who are not devotees, the main attraction may only turn out to be the Technicolorful scenery of Acapulco." John L. Scott of the Los Angeles Times wrote, "Presley buffs should eat it up ... Director Richard Thorpe has kept the film's pace swift, which helps to cover up a lack of character development and a routine plot." The Monthly Film Bulletin declared, "There is a distinct falling away here from the charm, humour and liveliness of some recent Elvis Presley films, notably Follow That Dream ...."

== See also ==
- List of American films of 1963
