= Follow That Dream (song) =

Song by Elvis Presley

from the EP Follow That Dream
- Released: 1962 (EP)
- Recorded: July 2, 1961
- Studio: RCA Studio B, Nashville, Tennessee
- Length: 1:38
- Songwriters: Fred Wise (lyrics); Ben Weisman (music)

"Follow That Dream" is a song first recorded by Elvis Presley as part of the soundtrack for his 1962 motion picture Follow That Dream.

It was also in 1962 released as the first track of the EP Follow That Dream.

The song peaked at number 15 on the Billboard Hot 100 and at number 5 on the Billboard Easy Listening chart.

== Writing and recording ==
The song was written by Fred Wise (lyrics) and Ben Weisman (music). Elvis Presley recorded it on July 2, 1961, in the RCA Studio B in Nashville, Tennessee.

== Bruce Springsteen versions ==
Bruce Springsteen said "Follow That Dream" was one of his favorite Elvis songs. He began performing a rearranged version of the song on the European leg of the River Tour in April 1981, at a much slower pace and with altered lyrics. This version appears in a bootleg vinyl recording of the same name. He later further revised the lyrics, and recorded the song during the Born in the U.S.A. sessions, although it remained unreleased. He performed the song in July 1988 in Switzerland, and many times in succeeding decades. On June 27, 2025, a version of the song appeared as the first song on his box set Tracks II: The Lost Albums.

== Charts ==
Chart (1962)	Peak position
U.S. Billboard Hot 100	15
U.S. Billboard Easy Listening	5
New Zealand (lever hits parade)	5
