= Speedway (1968 film) =

1968 musical film directed by Norman Taurog, starring Elvis Presley

- Theatrical release poster
- Directed by: Norman Taurog
- Written by: Phillip Shuken
- Produced by: Douglas Laurence
- Starring: Elvis Presley; Nancy Sinatra; Bill Bixby; Gale Gordon; Carl Ballantine
- Cinematography: Joseph Ruttenberg
- Edited by: Richard W. Farrell
- Music by: Jeff Alexander
- Production company: Metro-Goldwyn-Mayer
- Distributed by: Metro-Goldwyn-Mayer
- Release date: June 12, 1968 (US)
- Running time: 94 minutes
- Country: United States
- Language: English
- Budget: $3,000,000
- Box office: $2,000,000 (US/ Canada)

Speedway is a 1968 American musical action comedy film directed by Norman Taurog, starring Elvis Presley (in his last musical film role) as a racecar driver and Nancy Sinatra as his romantic interest. The film also features Bill Bixby in his second on-screen appearance alongside Presley, after 1967's Clambake.

Speedway earned mixed reviews and was a box office disappointment, but is considered one of the first films about NASCAR racing, and has been credited with increasing knowledge about the sport.

== Plot ==
The plot focuses on Steve Grayson, who is a NASCAR race car driver known for providing financial assistance to friends and acquaintances. His manager and friend, Kenny Donford, is a compulsive gambler who mismanages Grayson's earnings to support his gambling. As a result, Grayson faces problems with the Internal Revenue Service over unpaid taxes, while some of his possessions are repossessed. These financial difficulties affect his ability to continue racing and provide for those who depend on him.

Enter Susan Jacks, an IRS agent assigned to keep tabs on Steve and apply his future prize money toward his $150,000 debt, but she ends up taking a romantic interest in him as well. Both Steve and Susan also sing, which adds to the plot line.

== Cast ==
- Elvis Presley as Steve Grayson
- Nancy Sinatra as Susan Jacks
- Bill Bixby as Kenny Donford
- Gale Gordon as R. W. Hepworth
- William Schallert as Abel Esterlake
- Victoria Paige Meyerink as Ellie Esterlake
- Carl Ballantine as "Birdie" Kebner
- Ross Hagen as Paul Dado
- Charlotte Considine as Lori
- Sandy Reed as Speedway Announcer

Several professional stock-car racing drivers—better known now as NASCAR—appear in the film, including Buddy Baker, Tiny Lund, Richard Petty, and Cale Yarborough.

== Production ==
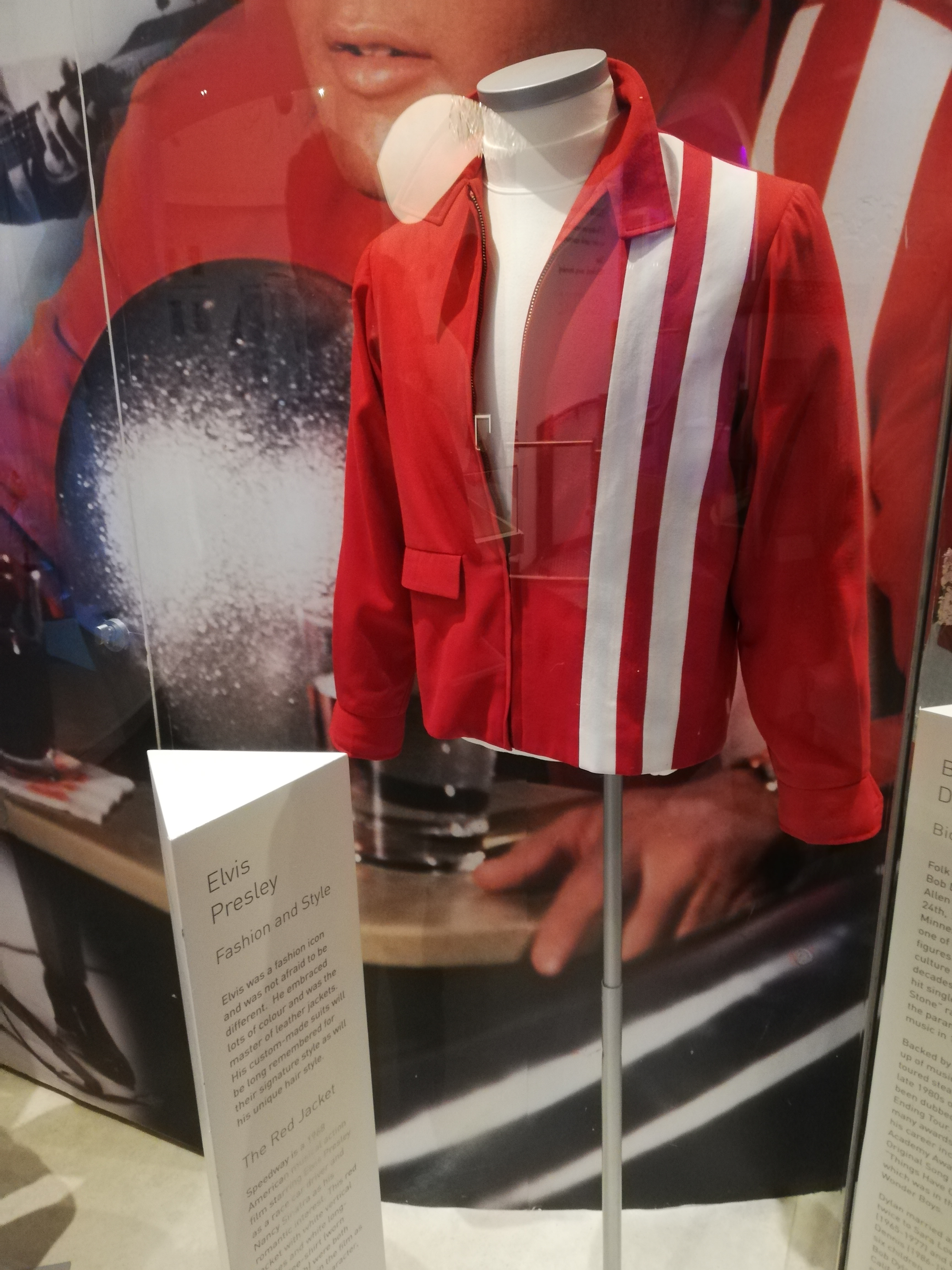
Jacket worn by Elvis in Speedway (Museum of Style Icons, Ireland)

Speedway was originally planned as a film to star Sonny & Cher. However, after their first movie, Good Times flopped at the box office, Columbia sold the rights to MGM, which retooled it for Elvis. Elvis was paid $850,000 plus 50% of the profits.

Petula Clark, Liza Minnelli and Annette Funicello were all offered the lead female role, but all three turned it down.

Filming began on 26 June 1967. Some scenes were shot at the Charlotte Motor Speedway in Concord, North Carolina. Professional driver Neil Castles served as Presley's stunt double; in a 1973 interview, he said of his role in Speedway: "I doubled for Elvis and I wrecked five or six cars pretty good".

This would be the final "formula" musical film of Presley's career. His remaining films would be less musical and more adult in tone.

Steve Grayson's generosity portrayed in the film was based loosely on Presley's real-life generosity, in which Presley would give cars, homes, and other expensive items to Memphis Mafia members (the media's nickname for his close group of friends and coworkers), family and friends, and even total strangers.

== Soundtrack ==
Speedway was accompanied by the release of a soundtrack album of the same name by RCA Victor.

== Release ==
Although the film was completed in the early summer of 1967, it was not released in theaters until June 1968. It was a box-office success placing at #40 for the year on the Variety weekly national box office list.

The only guitar to be featured in the film is during one of the film's closing scenes, during the performance of "There Ain't Nothing Like a Song", where a sunburst Fender Coronado is used.

== Reception ==
By 1968, Presley films had long become formulaic. Renata Adler of The New York Times wrote that Speedway was "just another Presley movie — which makes no great use at all of one of the most talented, important and durable performers of our time. Music, youth and customs were much changed by Elvis Presley 12 years ago; from the 26 movies he has made since he sang "Heartbreak Hotel" you would never guess it."

A review in Variety declared: "Under Norman Taurog's know-how comedy direction even some of the silliness in the Phillip Shuken script gets by as entertainment, but the story lacks the legitimacy of the better Presley starrers. However, with Presley in there swinging in his usual style and his own particular brand of lightness the feature stacks up as an okay entry."

Roger Ebert gave the film two stars out of four, writing: "Speedway is pleasant, kind, polite, sweet and noble," clearly aimed at audiences in the Southern US where stock car racing was most popular but neutralizing most of Presley's earlier sexualized and rebellious image to make him as reputable as Dick Powell.

Kevin Thomas of the Los Angeles Times wrote that the film "has a script that ran out of gas before Elvis Presley was born. Presley pictures can be unpretentious fun, but this one is both uninspired and too much of an imitation of too many of his previous movies ... There aren't even very many songs to break up developments too predictable to outline here." He thought Nancy Sinatra's one song was "the high point of the picture."

== Home media ==
Speedway was released on DVD by Warner Home Video on August 7, 2007, as a Region 1 widescreen DVD.

== See also ==
- List of American films of 1968
- Elvis Presley on film and television
