= Joy Byers =

American songwriter (1934–2017)

- Born: May 17, 1934
- Died: May 10, 2017 (aged 82)
- Occupation: Songwriter
- Known for: Songwriter for Elvis Presley

Joyce Alene Byers Johnston (May 17, 1934 – May 10, 2017) was an American songwriter best known for her work with Elvis Presley. She wrote Timi Yuro's 1962 hit "What's A Matter Baby".

She was married to the music producer Bob Johnston. In later years, Johnston claimed that some songs credited to his wife Joy Byers were actually co-written, or solely written by himself.

== Select discography ==
- 1967, "Let Yourself Go" from the 1968 film Speedway, writer
- 1965, "Please Don't Stop Loving Me", from the 1966 film Frankie and Johnny, writer
- 1964, "It Hurts Me", writer
- 1964, "When You Loved Me", writer
- 1964, "She Was My Baby (He Was My Friend)", writer
- 1963, "C'mon Everybody" from the musical film Viva Las Vegas, writer
