= Viva Las Vegas =

1964 film by George Sidney, starring Elvis Presley

- Theatrical release poster
- Directed by: George Sidney
- Written by: Sally Benson
- Produced by: Jack Cummings; George Sidney
- Starring: Elvis Presley; Ann-Margret; Cesare Danova; William Demarest; Nicky Blair
- Cinematography: Joseph F. Biroc
- Edited by: John McSweeney Jr.
- Music by: George E. Stoll
- Production company: Jack Cummings Productions
- Distributed by: Metro-Goldwyn-Mayer
- Release date: May 20, 1964 (United States)
- Running time: 85 minutes
- Country: United States
- Language: English
- Budget: $1 million
- Box office: $9.4 million

Viva Las Vegas is a 1964 American rock and roll musical film directed by George Sidney, written by Sally Benson, choreographed by David Winters, and starring Elvis Presley, Ann-Margret, Cesare Danova, William Demarest and Nicky Blair. Set in Las Vegas, Nevada, the film is about two competing race car drivers who also compete for the same girl.

The film's theme song "Viva Las Vegas" (written by Doc Pomus and Mort Shuman) did well on the year's record sales and has since become a theme song for the titular city.

The film is regarded by Elvis fans and film critics as one of Presley's best films, and it is noted for the real-life on-screen chemistry between Presley and Ann-Margret.

Viva Las Vegas was a hit at film theaters, as it was No. 14 on the Variety entertainment trade magazine's year end box office list of the top-grossing films of 1964.

== Plot ==
Lucky Jackson goes to Las Vegas, Nevada to participate in the city's first annual Grand Prix Race. However, his race car, an Elva Mark VI, is in need of a new engine to compete in the event. Lucky raises the necessary money by gambling.

In the race car garage he meets Italian race car driver, the wealthy Count Elmo Mancini and his Ferrari 250 GT Berlinetta. Both drivers know and respect each other but declare their intention to beat the other and win the race. When an attractive young woman enters the garage with a malfunctioning car, both men are immediately attracted to her. While Lucky tries to trick her into staying longer, Mancini repairs the car and she leaves without the men learning her name.

When Mancini suggests that she could be a showgirl, both he and Lucky watch various Las Vegas revues without finding her.

The next morning Lucky encounters the woman in his and Mancini's hotel: she is Rusty Martin, a University of Nevada student who works as swimming instructor at the hotel. When Lucky tries to woo her with a musical number, she throws him in the pool, where he loses all his money. He and his mechanic Shorty then have to work as waiters to pay his hotel bill.

Lucky then successfully asks Rusty out and they have an eventful day and begin to fall for each other. When Lucky brings her home, he meets her father, who takes a liking to Lucky and his race car driving.

The next day Mancini tells Rusty how dangerous race car driving is, so she asks Lucky to stop. But he insists racing is who he is, so Rusty leaves in anger. When Lucky sends her a thoughtful gift, she has a change of heart and searches for Lucky, trying to apologize. But she finds him arguing with Mancini and ignoring her. He tells Mancini that he plans on entering a talent contest to earn the money for his engine. Rusty angrily enters the contest herself and accepts Mancini's invitation for an intimate dinner in his room. Lucky is able to be the waiter for the dinner and sabotages it, also foiling Mancini when he tries to force himself on Rusty.

During the talent contest, Lucky and Rusty's elaborate sing-and-dance numbers wow the audience and lead to a tie. When Lucky wins the coin toss tie-breaker, he is disappointed to learn that the prize is not cash but a honeymoon vacation. Both sadly leave the venue.

On the last day before the race, Shorty surprisingly arrives with an engine. He and Lucky hurriedly begin installing it before the race start at midnight. Rusty's father also joins in. After singing in frustration to herself that her rival is a racing car, Rusty also starts helping.

The team manages to install the engine in time and Lucky enters the race, with Rusty, her father and Shorty watching in a helicopter and cheering him on. After many crashes, among them Mancini's car, Lucky wins the race. During the jubilation, Shorty lets slip that Rusty's father had given the money for Lucky's engine.

The film ends with Lucky and Rusty getting married and Mancini congratulating them.

== Cast ==
- Elvis Presley as "Lucky" Jackson
- Ann-Margret as Rusty Martin
- Cesare Danova as Count Elmo Mancini
- William Demarest as Mr. Martin, Rusty's Father
- Nicky Blair as "Shorty" Fansworth
- Jack Carter as Himself
- Teri Garr as Showgirl
- The Jubilee Four as Themselves
- George Cisar as Manager of Swingers (uncredited)
- Robert Aiken as Driver (uncredited)
- Red West as Son of Lone Star State (uncredited)

== Production ==
George Sidney later said "that was one of those cases where we had no script and we had a commitment. Originally it was something about an Arabian or something... But we turned it around and we wrote the script in about eleven days... We changed the whole thing and decided to do it in Las Vegas."

In March 1963, Metro-Goldwyn-Mayer president Robert O'Brien announced Viva Las Vegas would be one of 20 films made at the studio the following year. By May, Ann-Margret signed to co-star. She was paid $15,000 a week over ten weeks. Viva Las Vegas was filmed during the summer of 1963, before production of Presley's film Kissin' Cousins, but was released after Kissin' Cousins in the summer of 1964.

In Great Britain, both the film and its soundtrack were sold as Love in Las Vegas, since there was another, different film Meet Me in Las Vegas called Viva Las Vegas there, that was being shown in British cinemas at the same time that Presley's was released.

The chemistry between the two stars was genuine during filming. Presley and Ann-Margret began an affair, which received considerable attention from film and music gossip columnists, and reportedly led to a showdown with Presley's worried girlfriend Priscilla Beaulieu. (Elvis and Priscilla married in 1967.) In her 1985 book Elvis and Me, Priscilla Presley describes the difficulties that she experienced when the gossip columnists erroneously "announced" that Ann-Margret and Presley had become engaged to be married.

In her memoirs, Ann-Margret refers to Elvis Presley as her "soulmate" and stated: "We felt there was a need in 'The Industry' for a female Elvis Presley."

In addition, the filming of Viva Las Vegas reportedly produced unusually heated exchanges between the director, film veteran George Sidney, and Presley's manager, Colonel Tom Parker, who was not credited as a "Technical Advisor" in the film's credits.

The arguments reportedly concerned the amount of time and effort allotted by the cinematographer, Joseph Biroc, to the song and dance numbers that featured Ann-Margret, ostensibly on the orders of the director. These scenes include views of Ann-Margret's dancing taken from many different camera angles, the use of multiple cameras for each scene, and several retakes of each of her song-and-dance scenes.

David Winters, the film's choreographer, was recommended for the job by Ann-Margret, who was his dance student at the time. This was Winters's first job as a choreographer. The film presents a set of ten musical song-and-dance scenes.

Because the film went over budget, Parker would slash budgets for all remaining films in Presley's career.

Little Church of the West, the oldest wedding chapel in Las Vegas, is the location used in the closing scene.

The scene where Presley sings "Viva Las Vegas" is performed in one single unedited shot, the only known example of such a technique in Presley's film career.

The film also includes a scene (Lucky and the Count looking for Rusty) with the showgirls of the Folies Bergere at The Tropicana Hotel Las Vegas.

== Reception ==
=== Box office ===
The film grossed $9,442,967 at the box office, earning $5 million in U.S. theatrical rentals.

=== Critical ===
For his role in Viva Las Vegas, Elvis Presley received a third place prize 1965 Laurel Award for best male performance in a musical film. Viva Las Vegas was also the 1965 Laurel runner-up in the category of the best musical of 1964. Ann-Margret was praised for her on screen chemistry with Elvis, as she nearly stole the film from him.

Some critics in 1964 were lukewarm about Viva Las Vegas, such as Howard Thompson for The New York Times, who wrote: "Viva Las Vegas, the new Elvis Presley vehicle, is about as pleasant and unimportant as a banana split." However, many others deduced the reasons why many members of the North American public liked the movie so much. Variety stated in its review: "Beyond several flashy musical numbers, a glamorous locale, and one electrifying auto race sequence, the production is a pretty trite and 'heavyhanded' affair". Critical reaction notwithstanding, Viva Las Vegas has become one of Elvis Presley's most popular and iconic films.

Contemporary reception for the film has been positive. On review aggregator Rotten Tomatoes, the film holds an approval rating of 87% based on 30 reviews. The site's critics consensus reads, "Ann-Margret keeps Elvis on his toes and together they elevate Viva Las Vegas into a naughty and rockin' mild delight." FilmInk argued Ann-Margret "had so much energy and pep that she had blown her previous three male co-stars off screen, but Elvis could match her. He was the best on-screen partner she ever had, and she was his. It's the most purely entertaining Elvis movie ever, a complete delight and it's unbelievable they were never teamed again."

The film is recognized by American Film Institute in these lists:

- 2004: AFI's 100 Years...100 Songs:
  - "Viva Las Vegas" – Nominated
- 2006: AFI's Greatest Movie Musicals – Nominated

== Home media ==
=== Warner Home Video, August 1, 2000. ===
This DVD release contains the movie in two formats on a flipper disc. One side contains the movie in the Aspect Ratio: 1.33:1 (4:3), the other side is in Widescreen (Letterbox). The soundtrack is presented in mono.

=== Viva Las Vegas Deluxe Edition, Warner Home Video, August 7, 2007. ===
- Commentary by Steve Pond, rock journalist and author of Elvis in Hollywood
- Restored and Digitally Remastered in a 16x9 master, enhanced for widescreen televisions. Color/16x9 Anamorphic transfer 2.4:1
- New featurette Kingdom: Elvis in Vegas
- Remastered soundtrack in Dolby Digital 5.1 from original production elements and original mono theatrical soundtrack.

This film is the first of only two Elvis movies (the other being Jailhouse Rock) to be officially released onto every home media format distributed in the U.S. (Beta, VHS, CED Disc, Laserdisc, DVD, HD DVD and Blu-ray Disc)

== Planned remake ==
In 2001, Warner Bros. were developing a remake of Viva Las Vegas starring Ricky Martin as "a Puerto Rican singer who comes to Las Vegas to make it big", alongside Jennifer Lopez. The film was to be produced by Lisa Tornell with a screenplay by Jason Schafer. For whatever reason, this project did not eventuate.

== See also ==
- List of American films of 1964
- List of films set in Las Vegas
- Elvis Presley on film and television

== Bibliography ==
- Jorgensen, Ernst (1998). Elvis Presley A Life in Music: The Complete Recording Sessions. New York City: St. Martin's Press. pp. 172, 182, 183, 184, 199, and 416. ISBN 978-0312263157.
- Gamson, Joshua (1994). Claims to Fame: Celebrity in Contemporary America. Oakland, California: University of California Press. p. 46. ISBN 978-0520083530.
- Lee Harrington and Denise Bielby, ed. (2000). Popular Culture: Production and Consumption. Hoboken, New Jersey: Wiley-Blackwell. p. 273. ISBN 978-0631217107.
- Monder, Eric (1994). George Sidney: A Bio-Bibliography. Greenwood Press. ISBN 978-0-313-28457-1.
