= Tiny Timbrell =

- Born: Hilmer J. Timbrell; January 15, 1917; Canada
- Origin: Los Angeles, California, United States
- Died: May 7, 1992 (aged 75)
- Occupation: Session musician
- Instrument: Guitar

Hilmer J. "Tiny" Timbrell (January 15, 1917 – May 7, 1992) was a Canadian-born session guitarist.

Timbrell was born in Canada but moved to Los Angeles, California, to pursue his career in music. For a time, he sold guitars at Fife & Nichols, a Hollywood musical instrument store located at the corner of Sunset & Vine inside Wallach's Music City.

A "first call" guitarist at Warner Brothers Studios, in the late 1940s Timbrell appeared in several motion pictures playing as part of a band. His reputation was such that he was hired to play guitar on recording sessions for singing stars such as Doris Day, Billy Vaughn & His Orchestra, Rosemary Clooney, Bing Crosby, Harry James, and pop and country music artists such as Ricky Nelson and Marty Robbins.

Perhaps most significantly in his career, Timbrell played rhythm guitar for Elvis Presley, first at Radio Recorders studios in Los Angeles for the making of the soundtrack for the film, Loving You and later on numerous other soundtracks for Presley films.

In 1943, Timbrell married Margaret Ellen Scott. They had two children: Gail and Jay. Gail married and had three children: Roger, Nancy, and Steven. Both Roger and Steven followed their grandfather into the entertainment industry. Roger is a studio production accountant responsible for developing Showbiz Crew and SAG-AFTRA software. Steven works as an IATSE Local 1 stagehand in New York City.

In his later years, Timbrell worked as Los Angeles district sales representative for Chicago Musical Instrument Co., later named Norlin Music Corp., which at the time owned many instrument brands, including Gibson and Epiphone guitars.

Tiny Timbrell died in 1992 at the age of 75.

== Discography ==
With Harry James

- Harry James and His Orchestra 1948–49 (Big Band Landmarks Vol. X & XI, 1969)
