= List of songs recorded by Elvis Presley =

Songs by American singer and actor

This is a list of the songs recorded by Elvis Presley between his first demos at the Sun Studios in 1953 and his final concert on June 26, 1977, at the Market Square Arena in Indianapolis, Indiana. A total of 772 songs are listed here.

Notes:

- The recorded date is the first known date.
- Album debut refers to each track's first appearance on LP. Many tracks had their first commercial release on singles or EP (extended play) releases, which are not noted; initial album releases occurred anywhere from a few weeks to decades after first single release. Generally, only the first RCA-licensed release is noted, as opposed to earlier release on unauthorized bootlegs.
- From the late 1960s through the 1970s, several songs were recorded only in concert with no known formal studio recordings. Of the multiple live versions released on various albums (either full or partially live albums), the LP debut of the first known concert recording is indicated.
- If a track was recorded both in the studio and in concert, the album debut of the studio version is indicated (even if a live version was released on LP prior to the studio version, as in the case of "Suspicious Minds", "Patch It Up", and others).
- Tracks re-recorded in the studio are generally not included (e.g. "Blue Suede Shoes", "Love Letters", etc.).
- Songs for which Elvis was only recorded singing a line or two (e.g. "Tiptoe Through the Tulips", "MacArthur Park", a 1968 rehearsal recording in which he sang one line of "Funny How Time Slips Away", etc.) are not included.
- Rumored recordings, or recordings believed to exist but that for whatever reason have yet to be made public (such as an alleged 1955 Louisiana Hayride performance of "Rock Around the Clock" and the long-rumored Sun Records recording of "Uncle Penn") are not included either.

Title	Writer(s)	Year	Album debut	Ref.
500 Miles	Hedy West	1966	In A Private Moment	
Adam and Evil	Fred Wise, Randy Starr	1966	Spinout	
After Loving You	Eddie Miller, Johnny Lantz	1969	From Elvis in Memphis	
Ain't That Lovin' You, Baby	Clyde Otis, Ivory Joe Hunter	1958	Elvis' Gold Records Volume 4	
All I Needed Was the Rain	Sid Wayne, Ben Weisman	1967	Elvis Sings Flaming Star	
All Shook Up	Otis Blackwell, Elvis Presley	1957	Elvis' Golden Records	
All That I Am	Sid Tepper, Roy C. Bennett	1966	Spinout	
Allá en el Rancho Grande	Silvano Ramos, Juan Díaz del Moral, Emilio Donato Uranga	1970	Walk a Mile in My Shoes: The Essential '70s Masters	
Almost	Ben Weisman, Buddy Kaye	1969	Let's Be Friends	
Almost Always True	Fred Wise, Ben Weisman	1961	Blue Hawaii	
Almost in Love	Luiz Bonfá, Randy Starr	1968	Almost in Love	
Aloha 'Oe	Queen Lydia Lili'uokalani	1961	Blue Hawaii	
Alright, Okay, You Win	Sidney Wyche, Mayme Watts	1974	Dragonheart	
Always on My Mind	Wayne Carson, Johnny Christopher, Mark James	1972	Separate Ways	
Am I Ready	Sid Tepper, Roy C. Bennett	1966	Spinout	
Amazing Grace	John Newton	1971	He Touched Me	
America the Beautiful	Katharine Lee Bates, Samuel A. Ward	1975	Elvis Aron Presley	
An American Trilogy	Mickey Newbury	1972	Elvis as Recorded at Madison Square Garden	
And I Love You So	Don McLean	1975	Today	
And the Grass Won't Pay No Mind	Neil Diamond	1969	From Memphis to Vegas / From Vegas to Memphis (Back in Memphis)	
Angel	Sid Tepper, Roy C. Bennett	1961	C'mon Everybody	
Animal Instinct	Bernie Baum, Bill Giant, Florence Kaye	1965	Harum Scarum	
Any Day Now	Bob Hilliard, Burt Bacharach	1969	From Elvis in Memphis	
Any Way You Want Me (That's How I Will Be)	Aaron Schroeder, Cliff Owens	1956	Elvis' Golden Records	
Anyone (Could Fall in Love with You)	Bennie Benjamin, Luchi de Jesus, Sol Marcus	1963	Kissin' Cousins	
Anyplace Is Paradise	Joe Thomas	1956	Elvis (1956 album)	
Anything That's Part of You	Don Robertson	1961	Elvis' Golden Records Volume 3	
Apron Strings	George David Weiss, Aaron Schroeder	1959	Platinum: A Life in Music	
Are You Lonesome Tonight?	Lou Handman, Roy Turk	1960	Elvis' Golden Records Volume 3	
Are You Sincere	Wayne Walker	1973	Raised on Rock	
As Long As I Have You	Fred Wise, Ben Weisman	1958	King Creole	
Ask Me	Domenico Modugno, Bernie Baum, Florence Kaye, Bill Giant	1964	Elvis' Gold Records Volume 4	
Aubrey	David Gates	1974	From Sunset to Las Vegas	
Baby Let's Play House	Arthur Gunter	1955	A Date with Elvis	
Baby What You Want Me to Do	Jimmy Reed	1968	Elvis (1968 NBC-TV Special)	
Baby, If You'll Give Me All of Your Love	Joy Byers	1966	Double Trouble	
Barefoot Ballad	Dolores Fuller, Larry Morris	1963	Kissin' Cousins	
Beach Boy Blues	Sid Tepper, Roy C. Bennett	1961	Blue Hawaii	
Beach Shack	Bill Giant, Bernie Baum, Florence Kaye	1966	Spinout	
Because of Love	Ruth Batchelor, Bob Roberts	1962	Girls! Girls! Girls!	
Beginner's Luck	Roy C. Bennett, Sid Tepper	1965	Frankie and Johnny	
Beyond the Bend	Fred Wise, Ben Weisman, Dolores Fuller	1962	It Happened at the World's Fair	
Beyond the Reef	Jack Pitman	1966	Elvis Aron Presley	
Big Boots	Sid Wayne, Sherman Edwards	1960	G.I. Blues	
Big Boss Man	Al Smith, Luther Dixon	1967	Clambake	
A Big Hunk o' Love	Aaron Schroeder, Sidney Wyche	1958	50,000,000 Elvis Fans Can't Be Wrong – Elvis' Gold Records Volume 2	
Big Love, Big Heartache	Dolores Fuller, Lee Morris, Sonny Hendrix	1964	Roustabout	
Bitter They Are, Harder They Fall	Larry Gatlin	1976	From Elvis Presley Boulevard, Memphis, Tennessee	
Black Star	Sid Wayne, Sherman Edwards	1960	Collector's Gold	
Blessed Jesus (Hold My Hand)	Albert E. Brumley	1956	The Complete Million Dollar Session	
Blowin' in the Wind	Bob Dylan	1966	Platinum: A Life in Music	
Blue Christmas	Billy Hayes, Jay W. Johnson	1957	Elvis' Christmas Album	
Blue Eyes Crying in the Rain	Fred Rose	1976	From Elvis Presley Boulevard, Memphis Tennessee	
Blue Hawaii	Leo Robin, Ralph Rainger	1961	Blue Hawaii	
Blue Moon of Kentucky	Bill Monroe	1954	A Date with Elvis	
Blue Moon	Richard Rodgers, Lorenz Hart	1954	Elvis Presley	
Blue River	Paul Evans, Fred Tobias	1963	Double Trouble	
Blue Suede Shoes	Carl Perkins	1956	Elvis Presley	
Blueberry Hill	Vincent Rose, Al Lewis, Larry Stock	1957	Loving You	
Bosom of Abraham	William Johnson, George McFadden, Phillip Brooks	1971	He Touched Me	
Bossa Nova Baby	Jerry Leiber and Mike Stoller	1963	Fun in Acapulco	
A Boy Like Me, A Girl Like You	Sid Tepper, Roy C. Bennett	1962	Girls! Girls! Girls!	
Bridge Over Troubled Water	Paul Simon	1970	That's the Way It Is	
Bringin' It Back	Gregg Gordon	1975	Today	
Britches	Sherman Edwards, Sid Wayne	1960	Elvis: A Legendary Performer Volume 3	
Brown Eyed Handsome Man	Chuck Berry	1956	The Complete Million Dollar Session	
The Bullfighter Was a Lady	Sid Tepper, Roy C. Bennett	1963	Fun in Acapulco	
Burning Love	Dennis Linde	1972	Burning Love and Hits from His Movies, Volume 2	
By and By	Traditional	1966	How Great Thou Art	
A Cane and a High Starched Collar	Sid Tepper, Roy C. Bennett	1960	Elvis: A Legendary Performer Volume 2	
Can't Help Falling in Love	Hugo Peretti, Luigi Creatore and George David Weiss	1961	Blue Hawaii	
Carny Town	Fred Wise, Randy Starr	1964	Roustabout	
Catchin' On Fast	Bernie Baum, Bill Giant, Florence Kaye	1963	Kissin' Cousins	
Cattle Call	Tex Owens	1970	Platinum: A Life in Music	
Change of Habit	Ben Weisman, Buddy Kaye	1969	Let's Be Friends	
Charro	Mac Davis, Billy Strange	1968	Almost in Love	
Chesay	Ben Weisman, Fred Karger, Sid Wayne	1965	Frankie and Johnny	
Cindy, Cindy	Ben Weisman, Dolores Fuller, Buddy Kaye	1970	Love Letters from Elvis	
City by Night	Bill Giant, Bernie Baum, Florence Kaye	1966	Double Trouble	
Clambake	Ben Weisman, Sid Wayne	1967	Clambake	
Clean Up Your Own Backyard	Mac Davis, Billy Strange	1969	Almost in Love	
The Climb (lead vocals by George McFadden)	Jerry Leiber, Mike Stoller	1963	Viva Las Vegas (FTD Extended Soundtrack)	
C'mon Everybody	Joy Byers	1963	C'mon Everybody	
Come Along	David Hess	1965	Frankie and Johnny	
Come What May	Frank Tableporter	1966	Collectors Gold	
Confidence	Sid Tepper, Roy C. Bennett	1967	Clambake	
Cotton Candy Land	Ruth Batchelor, Bob Roberts	1962	It Happened at the World's Fair	
Cottonfields	Lead Belly	1970	That's the Way It Is (Special Edition 3-CD release from the year 2000)	
Could I Fall in Love	Randy Starr	1966	Double Trouble	
Crawfish	Fred Wise, Ben Weisman	1958	King Creole	
Crazy Arms	Ralph Mooney, Charles Seals	1956	The Complete Million Dollar Session	
Cross My Heart and Hope to Die	Ben Weisman, Sid Wayne	1964	Girl Happy	
Crying in the Chapel	Artie Glenn	1960	How Great Thou Art	
Crying Time	Buck Owens	1970	N/A	
Dainty Little Moonbeams	Unknown	1962	Double Features: Kid Galahad & Girls! Girls! Girls!	
Danny	Fred Wise, Ben Weisman	1958	Elvis: A Legendary Performer Volume 3	
Danny Boy	Frederic E. Weatherly	1976	From Elvis Presley Boulevard, Memphis Tennessee	
Dark Moon	Ned Miller	1966	A Golden Celebration	
Datin'	Fred Wise, Randy Starr	1965	Paradise, Hawaiian Style	
Didja' Ever	Sid Wayne, Sherman Edwards	1960	G.I. Blues	
Dirty, Dirty Feeling	Jerry Leiber and Mike Stoller	1960	Elvis Is Back!	
Dixieland Rock	Aaron Schroeder, Rachel Frank	1958	King Creole	
Do Not Disturb	Bernie Baum, Bill Giant, Florence Kaye	1964	Girl Happy	
Do the Clam	Ben Weisman, Dolores Fuller, Sid Wayne	1964	Girl Happy	
Do the Vega	Bill Giant, Bernie Baum, Florence Kaye	1963	Elvis Sings Flaming Star	
Do You Know Who I Am?	Bobby Russell	1969	From Memphis to Vegas / From Vegas to Memphis (Back in Memphis)	
A Dog's Life	Ben Weisman, Sid Wayne	1965	Paradise, Hawaiian Style	
Doin' the Best I Can	Doc Pomus, Mort Shuman	1960	G.I. Blues	
Dominic	Sid Wayne, Ben Weisman	1967	Double Features: Kissin' Cousins/Clambake/Stay Away, Joe	
Doncha' Think It's Time	Luther Dixon, Clyde Otis	1958	50,000,000 Elvis Fans Can't Be Wrong – Elvis' Gold Records Volume 2	
Don't	Jerry Leiber and Mike Stoller	1957	50,000,000 Elvis Fans Can't Be Wrong – Elvis' Gold Records Volume 2	
Don't Ask Me Why	Fred Wise, Ben Weisman	1958	King Creole	
Don't Be Cruel	Otis Blackwell, Elvis Presley	1956	Elvis' Golden Records	
Don't Cry Daddy	Mac Davis	1969	Worldwide 50 Gold Award Hits Volume 1	
Don't Forbid Me	Charles Singleton	1956	The Complete Million Dollar Session	
Don't Leave Me Now	Aaron Schroeder, Ben Weisman	1957	Loving You	
Don't Think Twice, It's All Right	Bob Dylan	1971	Elvis (1973 album)	
Double Trouble	Doc Pomus, Mort Shuman	1966	Double Trouble	
Down by the Riverside	Traditional	1956	The Complete Million Dollar Session	
Down in the Alley	Jesse Stone	1966	Spinout	
Drums of the Islands	Sid Tepper, Roy C. Bennett	1965	Paradise, Hawaiian Style	
Early Morning Rain	Gordon Lightfoot	1971	Elvis Now	
Earth Angel	Curtis Williams, Jesse Belvin and Gaynel Hodge	1959	A Golden Celebration	
Earth Boy	Sid Tepper, Roy C. Bennett	1962	Girls! Girls! Girls!	
Easy Come, Easy Go	Sid Wayne, Ben Weisman	1966	C'mon Everybody	
Echoes of Love	Bob Roberts, Paddy McMains	1963	Kissin' Cousins	
Edge of Reality	Bill Giant, Bernie Baum, Florence Kaye	1968	Almost in Love	
El Toro	Bill Giant, Bernie Baum, Florence Kaye	1963	Fun in Acapulco	
End of the Road	Jerry Lee Lewis	1956	The Complete Million Dollar Session	
An Evening Prayer	C. Maude Battersby, Charles H. Gabriel	1971	He Touched Me	
Everybody Come Aboard	Bernie Baum, Bill Giant, Florence Kaye	1965	Frankie and Johnny	
The Eyes of Texas	John L. Sinclair	1963	Elvis Sings Flaming Star	
Faded Love	Bob Wills, Johnnie Lee Wills	1970	Elvis Country (I'm 10,000 Years Old)	
The Fair's Moving On	Guy Fletcher, Doug Flett	1969	From Memphis to Vegas / From Vegas to Memphis (Back in Memphis)	
Fairytale	Anita Pointer, Bonnie Pointer	1975	Today	
Fame and Fortune	Fred Wise, Ben Weisman	1960	Elvis' Golden Records Volume 3	
Farther Along	Traditional	1966	How Great Thou Art	
Fever	John Davenport, Eddie Cooley	1960	Elvis Is Back!	
Find Out What's Happening	Jerry Crutchfield	1973	Raised on Rock	
Finders Keepers, Losers Weepers	Dory Jones, Ollie Jones	1963	Elvis for Everyone!	
First in Line	Aaron Schroeder, Ben Weisman	1956	Elvis (1956 album)	
The First Noel	Traditional	1971	Elvis sings The Wonderful World of Christmas	
The First Time Ever I Saw Your Face	Ewan MacColl	1971	Elvis Aron Presley	
Five Sleepy Heads	Sid Tepper, Roy C. Bennett	1967	Speedway	
Flaming Star	Sid Wayne, Sherman Edwards	1960	Elvis Sings Flaming Star	
Flip, Flop and Fly	Jesse Stone, Lou Willie Turner	1956	This is Elvis	
Follow That Dream	Fred Wise, Ben Weisman	1961	C'mon Everybody	
Fool	Carl Sigman, James Last	1972	Elvis (1973 album)	
Fool, Fool, Fool	Ahmet Ertegun	1955	The King of Rock 'n' Roll: The Complete 50's Masters	
The Fool	Naomi Ford, Lee Hazlewood	1970	Elvis Country (I'm 10,000 Years Old)	
Fools Fall in Love	Jerry Leiber and Mike Stoller	1966	I Got Lucky	
Fools Rush In (Where Angels Fear to Tread)	Johnny Mercer, Rube Bloom	1971	Elvis Now	
For Ol' Times Sake	Tony Joe White	1973	Raised on Rock	
For the Good Times	Kris Kristofferson	1972	Elvis as Recorded at Madison Square Garden	
For the Heart	Dennis Linde	1976	From Elvis Presley Boulevard, Memphis Tennessee	
For the Millionth and the Last Time	Roy C. Bennett, Sid Tepper	1961	Elvis for Everyone!	
Forget Me Never	Fred Wise, Ben Weisman	1960	Elvis for Everyone!	
Fort Lauderdale Chamber of Commerce	Sid Tepper, Roy C. Bennett	1964	Girl Happy	
Fountain of Love	Bill Giant, Jeff Lewis	1962	Pot Luck	
Frankfort Special	Sid Wayne, Sherman Edwards	1960	G.I. Blues	
Frankie and Johnny	Traditional	1965	Frankie and Johnny	
Froggy Went a-Courting	Traditional	1970	Walk a Mile in My Shoes: The Essential 70's Masters	
From a Jack to a King	Ned Miller	1969	From Memphis to Vegas / From Vegas to Memphis (Back in Memphis)	
Fun in Acapulco	Ben Weisman, Sid Wayne	1963	Fun in Acapulco	
Funny How Time Slips Away	Willie Nelson	1970	Elvis Country (I'm 10,000 Years Old)	
G.I. Blues	Sid Tepper, Roy C. Bennett	1960	G.I. Blues	
Gentle on My Mind	John Hartford	1969	From Elvis in Memphis	
Gently	Murray Wisell, Edward Lisbona	1961	Something for Everybody	
Ghost Riders in the Sky	Stan Jones	1970	The Way It Was	
Girl Happy	Doc Pomus, Norman Meade	1964	Girl Happy	
The Girl I Never Loved	Randy Starr	1967	Clambake	
Girl Next Door Went A-Walking	Bill Rice, Thomas Wayne	1960	Elvis Is Back!	
Girl of Mine	Les Reed, Barry Mason	1973	Raised on Rock	
The Girl of My Best Friend	Beverly Ross, Sam Bobrick	1960	Elvis Is Back!	
Girls! Girls! Girls!	Jerry Leiber and Mike Stoller	1962	Girls! Girls! Girls!	
Give Me the Right	Fred Wise, Norman Blagman	1961	Something for Everybody	
Go East-Young Man	Bernie Baum, Bill Giant, Florence Kaye	1965	Harum Scarum	
Goin' Home	Joy Byers	1968	Speedway	
Golden Coins	Bernie Baum, Bill Giant, Florence Kaye	1965	Harum Scarum	
Gonna Get Back Home Somehow	Doc Pomus, Mort Shuman	1962	Pot Luck	
Good Luck Charm	Aaron Schroeder, Wally Gold	1961	Elvis' Golden Records Volume 3	
Good Rocking Tonight	Roy Brown	1954	A Date with Elvis	
Good Time Charlie's Got the Blues	Danny O'Keefe	1973	Good Times	
Got a Lot o' Livin' to Do	Aaron Schroeder, Ben Weisman	1957	Loving You	
Got My Mojo Working	Preston Foster	1970	Love Letters from Elvis	
Green, Green Grass of Home	Curly Putman	1975	Today	
Guadalajara	Pepe Guízar	1963	Fun in Acapulco	
Guitar Man	Jerry Reed	1967	Clambake	
Hands Off	Jay McShann	1960	The Home Recordings	
Happy Ending	Ben Weisman, Sid Wayne	1962	It Happened at the World's Fair	
Happy, Happy Birthday Baby	Margo Sylvia, Gilbert Lopez	1958	Unreleased	
Harbor Lights	Wilhelm Grosz, Jimmy Kennedy	1954	Elvis: A Legendary Performer Volume 2	
Hard Headed Woman	Claude Demetrius	1958	King Creole	
Hard Knocks	Joy Byers	1964	Roustabout	
Hard Luck	Ben Weisman, Sid Wayne	1965	Frankie and Johnny	
Harem Holiday	Peter Andreoli, Vince Poncia	1965	Harum Scarum	
Have a Happy	Ben Weisman, Dolores Fuller, Buddy Kaye	1969	Let's Be Friends	
Have I Told You Lately That I Love You?	Johnny Russell, Scott Wiseman	1957	Loving You	
Hawaiian Sunset	Sid Tepper, Roy C. Bennett	1961	Blue Hawaii	
Hawaiian Wedding Song	Al Hoffman, Charles E. King, Dick Manning	1961	Blue Hawaii	
He is My Everything	Dallas Frazier	1971	He Touched Me	
He Knows Just What I Need	Mosie Lister	1960	His Hand in Mine	
He	Jack Richards, Richard Mullen	1960	In a Private Moment	
He Touched Me	Bill Gaither	1971	He Touched Me	
Heart of Rome	Alan Blaikley, Ken Howard, Geoff Stephens	1970	Love Letters from Elvis	
Heartbreak Hotel	Mae Axton, Tommy Durden, Elvis Presley	1956	Elvis' Golden Records	
Hearts of Stone	Eddie Ray, Rudy Jackson	1955	Sunrise	
He'll Have to Go	Joe Allison, Audrey Allison	1977	Moody Blue	
Help Me	Larry Gatlin	1973	Promised Land	
Help Me Make It Through the Night	Kris Kristofferson	1971	Elvis Now	
Here Comes Santa Claus	Gene Autry, Oakley Haldeman	1957	Elvis' Christmas Album	
He's Your Uncle, Not Your Dad	Sid Wayne, Ben Weisman	1967	Speedway	
Hey Jude	John Lennon and Paul McCartney	1969	Elvis Now	
Hey Little Girl	Joy Byers	1965	Harum Scarum	
Hey, Hey, Hey	Joy Byers	1967	Clambake	
Hide Thou Me	Thoro Harris, L.R. Tolbert	1966	Today, Tomorrow, and Forever	
Hi-Heel Sneakers	Robert Higginbotham	1967	Elvis Aron Presley	
His Hand in Mine	Mosie Lister	1960	His Hand in Mine	
Holly Leaves and Christmas Trees	Glenn Spreen, Red West	1971	Elvis sings The Wonderful World of Christmas	
Home Is Where the Heart Is	Sherman Edwards, Hal David	1961	I Got Lucky	
Hot Dog	Jerry Leiber and Mike Stoller	1957	Loving You	
Hound Dog	Jerry Leiber and Mike Stoller	1956	Elvis' Golden Records	
House of Sand	Bill Giant, Bernie Baum, Florence Kaye	1965	Paradise, Hawaiian Style	
A House That Has Everything	Sid Tepper, Roy C. Bennett	1967	Clambake	
How Can You Lose What You Never Had?	Ben Weisman, Sid Wayne	1967	Clambake	
How Do You Think I Feel?	Webb Pierce, Wayne Walker	1956	Elvis (1956 album)	
How Great Thou Art	Stuart K. Hine	1966	How Great Thou Art	
How the Web Was Woven	Clive Westlake, David Most	1970	That's the Way It Is	
How Would You Like to Be?	Ben Raleigh, Mark Barkan	1962	It Happened at the World's Fair	
How's the World Treating You?	Chet Atkins, Boudleaux Bryant	1956	Elvis (1956 album)	
A Hundred Years from Now	Lester Flatt, Earl Scruggs	1970	Walk a Mile in My Shoes: The Essential 70's Masters	
Hurt	Jimmie Crane, Al Jacobs	1976	From Elvis Presley Boulevard, Memphis Tennessee	
Husky, Dusky Day	Unknown	1960	Wild in the Country (FTD Extended Album)	
I Asked the Lord (He's Only a Prayer Away)	Lange, Duncan	1959	A Golden Celebration	
I Beg of You	Rose Marie McCoy	1957	50,000,000 Elvis Fans Can't Be Wrong – Elvis' Gold Records Volume 2	
I Believe	Ervin Drake, Irvin Graham, Jimmy Shirl, Al Stillman	1957	Elvis' Christmas Album (original 1957 album)	
I Believe in the Man in the Sky	Richard Howard	1960	His Hand in Mine	
I Can Help	Billy Swan	1975	Today	
I Can't Help It (If I'm Still in Love with You)	Hank Williams	1959	Platinum: A Life in Music	
I Can't Stop Loving You	Don Gibson	1969	From Memphis to Vegas / From Vegas to Memphis (In Person at the International Hotel, Las Vegas)	
I Didn't Make It On Playing Guitar (Informal Jam session)	Elvis Presley	1970	Essential Elvis Volume 4: A Hundred Years From Now	
I Don't Care If the Sun Don't Shine	Mack David	1954	The Sun Sessions	
I Don't Wanna Be Tied	Bill Giant, Bernie Baum, Florence Kaye	1962	Girls! Girls! Girls!	
I Don't Want To	Janice Torre, Fred Spielman	1962	Girls! Girls! Girls!	
I Feel So Bad	Chuck Willis	1961	Elvis' Golden Records Volume 3	
I Feel That I've Known You Forever	Doc Pomus, Alan Jeffreys	1962	Pot Luck	
I Forgot to Remember to Forget	Charlie Feathers, Stan Kesler	1955	A Date with Elvis	
I Got a Feelin' in My Body	Dennis Linde	1973	Good Times	
I Got a Woman	Ray Charles, Renald Richard	1956	Elvis Presley	
I Got Lucky	Fred Wise, Dolores Fuller, Ben Weisman	1961	I Got Lucky	
I Got Stung	Aaron Schroeder, David Hill	1958	50,000,000 Elvis Fans Can't Be Wrong – Elvis' Gold Records Volume 2	
I Gotta Know	Paul Evans, Matt Williams	1960	Elvis' Golden Records Volume 3	
I Hear a Sweet Voice Calling	Bill Monroe	1956	The Complete Million Dollar Session	
I Just Can't Help Believin'	Barry Mann, Cynthia Weil	1970	That's the Way It Is	
I Just Can't Make It by Myself	Clara Ward	1956	The Complete Million Dollar Session	
I Love Only One Girl	Sid Tepper, Roy C. Bennett	1966	Double Trouble	
I Love You Because	Leon Payne	1954	Elvis Presley	
I Met Her Today	Don Robertson, Hal Blair	1961	Elvis for Everyone!	
I Miss You	Donnie Sumner	1973	Raised on Rock	
I Need Somebody to Lean On	Doc Pomus, Mort Shuman	1963	I Got Lucky	
I Need You So	Ivory Joe Hunter	1957	Loving You	
I Need Your Love Tonight	Sid Wayne, Bix Reichner	1958	50,000,000 Elvis Fans Can't Be Wrong – Elvis' Gold Records Volume 2	
I Need Your Lovin'	Don Gardner, Bobby Robinson	1971	From Hollywood To Vegas	
I Really Don't Want to Know	Howard Barnes, Don Robertson	1970	Elvis Country (I'm 10,000 Years Old)	
I Shall Be Released	Bob Dylan	1971	Walk a Mile in My Shoes: The Essential 70's Masters	
I Shall Not Be Moved	Traditional	1956	The Complete Million Dollar Session	
I Slipped, I Stumbled, I Fell	Fred Wise, Ben Weisman	1960	Something for Everybody	
I Think I'm Gonna Like It Here	Don Robertson, Hal Blair	1963	Fun in Acapulco	
I Understand (Just How You Feel)	Pat Best	1958	The Home Recordings	
I Walk the Line	Johnny Cash	1970	The Entertainer	
I Want to Be Free	Jerry Leiber and Mike Stoller	1957	A Date with Elvis	
I Want You with Me	Woody Harris	1961	Something for Everybody	
I Want You, I Need You, I Love You	Maurice Mysels, Ira Kosloff	1956	Elvis' Golden Records	
I Was Born About Ten Thousand Years Ago	Traditional	1970	Elvis Country (fragmented version); Elvis Now (complete version)	
I Was the One	Aaron Schroeder, Claude DeMetrius, Hal Blair, Bill Peppers	1956	For LP Fans Only	
I Washed My Hands In Muddy Water	Joe Babcock	1970	Elvis Country (I'm 10,000 Years Old)	
I Will Be Home Again	Bennie Benjamin, Raymond Leveen, Lou Singer	1960	Elvis Is Back!	
I Will Be True	Ivory Joe Hunter	1971	Elvis (1973 album)	
I Wonder, I Wonder, I Wonder	Daryl Hutchins	1960	In a Private Moment	
I, John	William Johnson, George McFadden, Phillip Brooks	1972	He Touched Me	
If Every Day Was Like Christmas	Red West	1966	Elvis' Christmas Album (1970 RCA Camden reissue)	
If I Can Dream	Walter Earl Brown	1968	Elvis (1968 NBC-TV Special)	
If I Get Home on Christmas Day	Tony Macaulay	1971	Elvis sings The Wonderful World of Christmas	
If I Loved You	Oscar Hammerstein II, Richard Rodgers	1966	Time/Life Collection Volume 1: Love Songs	
If I Were You	Gerald Nelson	1970	Love Letters from Elvis	
If I'm a Fool (For Loving You)	Stan Kesler	1969	Let's Be Friends	
If That Isn't Love	Dottie Rambo	1973	Good Times	
If the Lord Wasn't Walking by My Side	Henry Slaughter	1966	How Great Thou Art	
If We Never Meet Again	Albert E. Brumley	1960	His Hand in Mine	
If You Don't Come Back	Jerry Leiber and Mike Stoller	1973	Raised on Rock	
If You Love Me (Let Me Know)	John Rostill	1977	Moody Blue	
If You Talk in Your Sleep	Red West, Johnny Christopher	1973	Promised Land	
If You Think I Don't Need You	Red West, Joe Cooper	1963	I Got Lucky	
I'll Be Back	Ben Weisman, Sid Wayne	1966	Spinout	
I'll Be Home for Christmas	Walter Kent, Kim Gannon, Buck Ram	1957	Elvis' Christmas Album	
I'll Be Home on Christmas Day	Michael Jarrett	1971	Elvis sings The Wonderful World of Christmas	
I'll Be There	Bobby Darin	1969	Let's Be Friends	
I'll Hold You in My Heart (Till I Can Hold You in My Arms)	Thomas Dilbeck, Hal Horton, Eddy Arnold	1969	From Elvis in Memphis	
I'll Never Fall in Love Again	Lonnie Donegan, Jimmy Currie	1976	From Elvis Presley Boulevard, Memphis, Tennessee	
I'll Never Know	Fred Karger, Sid Wayne, Ben Weisman	1970	Love Letters from Elvis	
I'll Never Let You Go (Little Darlin')	Jimmy Wakely	1954	Elvis Presley	
I'll Never Stand In Your Way	Fred Rose, Hy Heath	1954	Platinum: A Life in Music	
I'll Remember You	Kui Lee	1966	Spinout	
I'll Take Love	Dolores Fuller, Mark Barker	1966	C'mon Everybody	
I'll Take You Home Again, Kathleen	Thomas Paine Westendorf	1971	Elvis (1973 album)	
I'm a Roustabout	Otis Blackwell, Winfield Scott	1964	2nd to None	
I'm Beginning to Forget You	Willie Phelps	1959	Elvis: A Legendary Performer Volume 4	
I'm Comin' Home	Charlie Rich	1961	Something for Everybody	
I'm Counting on You	Don Robertson	1956	Elvis Presley	
I'm Falling in Love Tonight	Don Robertson	1962	It Happened at the World's Fair	
I'm Gonna Bid My Blues Goodbye	Hank Snow	1956	The Complete Million Dollar Session	
I'm Gonna Sit Right Down and Cry (Over You)	Howard Biggs, Joe Thomas	1956	Elvis Presley	
I'm Gonna Walk Dem Golden Stairs	Culley Holt	1960	His Hand in Mine	
I'm Leavin'	Michael Jarrett, Sonny Charles	1971	Elvis Aron Presley	
I'm Leaving It All Up to You	Don Harris and Dewey Terry	1973	Stage Rehearsal	
I'm Left, You're Right, She's Gone	Stan Kesler, William Taylor	1955	For LP Fans Only	
I'm Movin' On	Hank Snow	1969	From Elvis in Memphis	
I'm Not the Marrying Kind	Sherman Edwards, Mack David	1961	C'mon Everybody	
I'm So Lonesome I Could Cry	Hank Williams	1973	Aloha from Hawaii Via Satellite	
I'm With a Crowd (But So Alone)	Ernest Tubb	1956	The Complete Million Dollar Session	
I'm Yours	Hal Blair, Don Robertson	1961	Pot Luck	
The Impossible Dream	Joe Darion, Mitch Leigh	1972	Elvis as Recorded at Madison Square Garden	
In My Father's House	Aileene Hanks	1960	His Hand in Mine	
In My Way	Fred Wise, Ben Weisman	1960	Elvis for Everyone!	
In the Garden	C. Austin Miles	1966	How Great Thou Art	
In the Ghetto	Mac Davis	1969	From Elvis in Memphis	
In Your Arms	Aaron Schroeder, Wally Gold	1961	Something for Everybody	
Indescribably Blue	Darrell Glenn	1966	Elvis' Gold Records Volume 4	
Inherit the Wind	Eddie Rabbitt	1969	From Memphis to Vegas / From Vegas to Memphis (Back in Memphis)	
Is It So Strange	Faron Young	1957	A Date with Elvis	
Island Of Love	Sid Tepper, Roy C. Bennett	1961	Blue Hawaii	
It Ain't No Big Thing (But It's Growing)	Shorty Hall, Alice Joy Merritt, Neal Merritt	1970	Love Letters from Elvis	
It Feels So Right	Fred Wise, Ben Weisman	1960	Elvis Is Back!	
It Hurts Me	Joy Byers, Charlie Daniels	1964	Elvis' Gold Records Volume 4	
It Is No Secret (What God Can Do)	Stuart Hamblen	1957	Elvis' Christmas Album (original 1957 album)	
It Keeps Right On a-Hurtin'	Johnny Tillotson	1969	From Elvis in Memphis	
It Won't Be Long	Ben Weisman, Sid Wayne	1966	Double Trouble	
It Won't Seem Like Christmas (Without You)	Balthazar, J. A. Balthrop	1971	Elvis sings The Wonderful World of Christmas	
It Wouldn't Be the Same without You	Fred Rose	1954	Sunrise	
Ito Eats	Sid Tepper, Roy C. Bennett	1961	Blue Hawaii	
It's a Matter of Time	Clive Westlake	1972	Burning Love and Hits From his Movies Volume 2	
It's a Sin	Fred Rose, Zeb Turner	1961	Something for Everybody	
It's a Sin to Tell a Lie	Billy Mayhew	1966	In a Private Moment	
It's a Wonderful World	Sid Tepper, Roy C. Bennett	1964	Roustabout	
(It's a) Long Lonely Highway	Doc Pomus, Mort Shuman	1963	Kissin' Cousins	
It's Been So Long Darling	Ernest Tubb	1959	Platinum: A Life In Music	
It's Carnival Time	Ben Weisman, Sid Wayne	1964	Roustabout	
It's Diff'rent Now	Clive Westlake	1973	Walk a Mile in My Shoes: The Essential 70's Masters	
It's Easy for You	Andrew Lloyd Webber, Tim Rice	1977	Moody Blue	
It's Impossible	Armando Manzanero, Sid Wayne	1972	Elvis (1973 album)	
It's Midnight	Billy Edd Wheeler, Jerry Chesnut	1973	Promised Land	
It's No Fun Being Lonely	Red West	1966	The Home Recordings	
It's Now or Never	Eduardo di Capua, Aaron Schroeder, Wally Gold	1960	Elvis' Golden Records Volume 3	
It's Only Love	Mark James, Steve Tyrell	1971	Elvis Aron Presley	
It's Over	Jimmie F. Rodgers	1973	Aloha from Hawaii via Satellite	
It's Still Here	Ivory Joe Hunter	1971	Elvis (1973 album)	
It's Your Baby You Rock It	Shirl Milete, Nora Fowler	1970	Elvis Country (I'm 10,000 Years Old)	
I've Been Blue	Red West	1966	The Home Recordings	
I've Got a Thing About You Baby	Tony Joe White	1973	Good Times	
I've Got Confidence	Andrae Crouch	1971	He Touched Me	
I've Got To Find My Baby	Joy Byers	1964	Girl Happy	
I've Lost You	Ken Howard, Alan Blaikley	1970	That's the Way It Is	
Jailhouse Rock	Jerry Leiber and Mike Stoller	1957	Elvis' Golden Records	
Johnny B. Goode	Chuck Berry	1969	From Memphis to Vegas / From Vegas to Memphis (In Person at the International Hotel, Las Vegas)	
Joshua Fit the Battle	Traditional	1960	His Hand in Mine	
Judy	Teddy Redell	1961	Something for Everybody	
Just a Closer Walk with Thee	Traditional	1958	Unreleased	
Just a Little Bit	Ralph Bass, Fats Washington, John Thornton, Piney Brown	1973	Raised on Rock	
Just a Little Talk with Jesus	Cleavant Derricks	1956	The Complete Million Dollar Session	
Just Because	Sydney Robin, Bob Shelton, Joe Shelton	1954	Elvis Presley	
Just Call Me Lonesome	Rex Griffin	1967	Clambake	
Just for Old Time Sake	Sid Tepper, Roy C. Bennett	1962	Pot Luck	
Just Pretend	Doug Flett, Guy Fletcher	1970	That's the Way It Is	
Just Tell Her Jim Said Hello	Jerry Leiber and Mike Stoller	1962	Elvis' Gold Records Volume 4	
Keep Your Hands Off Of It	Jay McShann	1970	Walk a Mile in My Shoes: The Essential 70's Masters	
Keeper of the Key	Wynn Stewart, Harlan Howard, Beverly Stewart, Kenny Devine, Lance Guynes	1956	The Complete Million Dollar Session	
Kentucky Rain	Eddie Rabbitt and Dick Heard	1969	Worldwide 50 Gold Award Hits Volume 1	
King Creole	Jerry Leiber and Mike Stoller	1958	King Creole	
King of the Whole Wide World	Bob Roberts, Ruth Batchelor	1961	C'mon Everybody	
Kismet	Sid Tepper, Roy C. Bennett	1965	Harum Scarum	
Kiss Me Quick	Doc Pomus, Mort Shuman	1961	Pot Luck	
Kissin' Cousins	Fred Wise, Randy Starr	1963	Kissin' Cousins	
Kissin' Cousins (Number 2)	Bernie Baum, Bill Giant, Florence Kaye	1963	Kissin' Cousins	
Known Only to Him	Stuart Hamblen	1960	His Hand in Mine	
Ku-U-I-Po	George David Weiss, Hugo Peretti, Luigi Creatore	1961	Blue Hawaii	
The Lady Loves Me (with Ann-Margret)	Sid Tepper, Roy C. Bennett	1963	Elvis: A Legendary Performer Volume 4	
Lady Madonna	John Lennon and Paul McCartney	1971	Walk a Mile in My Shoes: The Essential 70's Masters	
The Last Farewell	Roger Whittaker, Ron A. Webster	1976	From Elvis Presley Boulevard, Memphis Tennessee	
Lawdy Miss Clawdy	Lloyd Price	1956	For LP Fans Only	
Lead Me, Guide Me	Doris Akers	1971	He Touched Me	
Let It Be Me	Mann Curtis, Pierre Delanoë, Gilbert Bécaud	1970	On Stage	
Let Me	Elvis Presley, Vera Matson	1956	The Other Sides – Elvis Worldwide Gold Award Hits Vol. 2	
Let Me Be the One	Roger Nichols, Paul Williams	1974	N/A	
Let Me Be There	John Rostill	1974	Elvis Recorded Live on Stage in Memphis	
(Let Me Be Your) Teddy Bear	Kal Mann, Bernie Lowe	1957	Loving You	
Let Yourself Go	Joy Byers	1967	Speedway	
Let's Be Friends	Chris Arnold, David Martin, Geoff Morrow	1969	Let's Be Friends	
Let's Forget About the Stars	A. L. Owens	1968	Let's Be Friends	
Let Us Pray	Ben Weisman, Buddy Kaye	1969	You'll Never Walk Alone	
Life	Shirl Milete	1970	Love Letters from Elvis	
Like a Baby	Jesse Stone	1960	Elvis Is Back!	
Listen to the Bells	Lee Roy Abernathy	1971	Essential Elvis Volume 4: A Hundred Years From Now	
A Little Bit of Green	Chris Arnold, Geoff Morrow, David Martin	1969	From Memphis to Vegas / From Vegas to Memphis (Back in Memphis)	
Little Cabin on the Hill	Bill Monroe, Lester Flatt	1970	Elvis Country (I'm 10,000 Years Old)	
Little Darlin'	Maurice Williams	1977	Moody Blue	
Little Egypt (Ying-Yang)	Jerry Leiber and Mike Stoller	1964	Roustabout	
A Little Less Conversation	Billy Strange, Mac Davis	1968	Almost in Love	
Little Mama	Gene Clark	1955	A Boy from Tupelo: The Complete 1953-1955 Recordings	
Little Sister	Doc Pomus, Mort Shuman	1961	Elvis' Golden Records Volume 3	
Lonely Man	Bennie Benjamin, Sol Marcus	1960	Elvis' Gold Records Volume 4	
Lonesome Cowboy	Sid Tepper, Roy C. Bennett	1957	Loving You	
Long Black Limousine	Vern Stovall, Bobby George	1969	From Elvis in Memphis	
Long Legged Girl (with the Short Dress On)	J. Leslie McFarland, Winfield Scott	1966	Double Trouble	
Long Tall Sally	Robert Blackwell, Enotris Johnson, Richard Penniman	1956	Elvis (1956 album)	
Look Out, Broadway	Fred Wise, Randy Starr	1965	Frankie and Johnny	
The Lord's Prayer	Albert Hay Malotte	1971	Essential Elvis Volume 4: A Hundred Years From Now	
Love Coming Down	Jerry Chesnut	1976	From Elvis Presley Boulevard, Memphis Tennessee	
Love Letters	Edward Heyman, Victor Young	1966	Elvis' Gold Records Volume 4	
The Love Machine	Chuck Taylor, Fred Burch, Gerald Nelson	1966	I Got Lucky	
Love Me	Jerry Leiber and Mike Stoller	1956	Elvis (1956 album)	
Love Me Tender	Elvis Presley, George R. Poulton and Vera Matson (pseudonym of Ken Darby, uncredited)	1956	Elvis' Golden Records	
Love Me Tonight	Don Robertson	1963	Fun in Acapulco	
Love Me, Love the Life I Lead	Roger Greenaway, Tony Macaulay	1971	Elvis (1973 album)	
Love Song of the Year	Chris Christian	1973	Promised Land	
Lover Doll	Sid Wayne, Abner Silver	1958	King Creole	
Loving Arms	Tom Jans	1973	Good Times	
Loving You	Jerry Leiber and Mike Stoller	1957	Loving You	
Make Me Know It	Otis Blackwell	1960	Elvis Is Back!	
Make the World Go Away	Hank Cochran	1970	Elvis Country (I'm 10,000 Years Old)	
Mama	Charles O'Curran, Dudley Brooks	1962	Let's Be Friends	
Mama Liked the Roses	Johnny Christopher	1969	Elvis' Christmas Album (1970 RCA Camden reissue)	
Mansion Over the Hilltop	Ira Stanphill	1960	His Hand in Mine	
Marguerita	Don Robertson	1963	Fun in Acapulco	
(Marie's the Name) His Latest Flame	Doc Pomus, Mort Shuman	1961	Elvis' Golden Records Volume 3	
Mary in the Morning	Johnny Cymbal, Michael Rashkow	1970	That's the Way It Is	
Mary Lou Brown	Red West	1966	The Home Recordings	
Maybellene	Chuck Berry	1955	The Beginning Years, 1954 to '56	
Mean Woman Blues	Claude Demetrius	1957	Loving You	
The Meanest Girl in Town	Joy Byers	1964	Girl Happy	
Memories	Billy Strange, Mac Davis	1968	Elvis (1968 NBC-TV Special)	
Memphis Tennessee	Chuck Berry	1964	Elvis for Everyone!	
Men with Broken Hearts	Hank Williams	1970	Walk a Mile in My Shoes: The Essential 70's Masters	
Merry Christmas Baby	Lou Baxter, Johnny Moore	1971	Elvis sings The Wonderful World of Christmas	
A Mess of Blues	Doc Pomus, Mort Shuman	1960	Elvis' Gold Records Volume 4	
Mexico	Sid Tepper, Roy C. Bennett	1963	Fun in Acapulco	
Mickey Mouse Club March	Jimmie Dodd	1975	N/A	
Milkcow Blues Boogie	Kokomo Arnold	1954	A Date with Elvis	
Milky White Way	Lander Coleman	1960	His Hand in Mine	
Mine	Sid Tepper, Roy C. Bennett	1967	Speedway	
Miracle of the Rosary	Lee Denson	1971	Elvis Now	
Mirage	Joy Byers	1965	Harum Scarum	
Mona Lisa	Ray Evans, Jay Livingston	1959	Elvis: A Legendary Performer Volume 4	
Money Honey	Jesse Stone	1956	Elvis Presley	
Moody Blue	Mark James	1976	Moody Blue	
Moonlight Sonata	Ludwig van Beethoven	1966	In a Private Moment	
Moonlight Swim	Ben Weisman, Sylvia Dee	1961	Blue Hawaii	
Mr. Songman	Donnie Sumner	1973	Promised Land	
Must Jesus Bear the Cross Alone	Thomas Shepherd, Henry Ward Beecher, George Nelson Allen	1972	Amazing Grace: His Greatest Sacred Performances	
My Babe	Willie Dixon	1969	From Memphis to Vegas / From Vegas to Memphis (In Person at the International Hotel, Las Vegas)	
My Baby Left Me	Arthur Crudup	1956	For LP Fans Only	
My Boy	Bill Martin, Phil Coulter, Jean-Pierre Bourtayre, Claude François	1973	Good Times	
My Desert Serenade	Stanley J. Gelber	1965	Harum Scarum	
My Happiness	Betty Peterson Blasco, Borney Bergantine	1953	The Great Performances	
My Heart Cries for You	Carl Sigman, Percy Faith	1966	A Golden Celebration	
My Little Friend	Shirl Milete	1969	Almost in Love	
My Way	Paul Anka, Claude Francois, Gilles Thibaut, Jacques Revaux	1971	Walk a Mile in My Shoes: The Essential 70's Masters	
My Wish Came True	Ivory Joe Hunter	1957	50,000,000 Elvis Fans Can't Be Wrong – Elvis' Gold Records Volume 2	
Mystery Train	Junior Parker	1955	For LP Fans Only	
Nearer, My God, to Thee	Sarah Flower Adams	1972	Amazing Grace: His Greatest Sacred Performances	
Never Again	Billy Edd Wheeler, Jerry Chesnut	1976	From Elvis Presley Boulevard, Memphis Tennessee	
Never Been to Spain	Hoyt Axton	1972	Elvis as Recorded at Madison Square Garden	
Never Ending	Buddy Kaye, Philip Springer	1963	Double Trouble	
Never Say Yes	Doc Pomus, Mort Shuman	1966	Spinout	
New Orleans	Sid Tepper, Roy C. Bennett	1958	King Creole	
The Next Step Is Love	Paul Evans, Paul Parnes	1970	That's the Way It Is	
Night Life	Bill Giant, Bernie Baum, Florence Kaye	1963	Elvis Sings Flaming Star	
Night Rider	Doc Pomus, Mort Shuman	1962	Pot Luck	
No More	Don Robertson, Hal Blair, Sebastián Iradier	1961	Blue Hawaii	
No Room to Rhumba in a Sports Car	Fred Wise, Dick Manning	1963	Fun in Acapulco	
Nothingville	Billy Strange, Mac Davis	1968	Elvis (1968 NBC-TV Special)	
(Now and Then There's) A Fool Such as I	Bill Trader	1958	50,000,000 Elvis Fans Can't Be Wrong – Elvis' Gold Records Volume 2	
O Come, All Ye Faithful	Traditional	1971	Elvis sings The Wonderful World of Christmas	
O Little Town of Bethlehem	Phillips Brooks, Lewis H. Redner	1957	Elvis' Christmas Album	
Oh Happy Day (1)	Don Howard Koplow	1968	The Complete '68 Comeback Special	
Oh Happy Day (2)	Philip Doddridge, Edward Rimbault	1970	That's The Way It Is – Special Edition	
Oh, How I Love Jesus	Frederick Whitfield	1966	Platinum: A Life in Music	
Old MacDonald	Traditional	1966	Double Trouble	
Old Shep	Red Foley	1956	Elvis (1956 album)	
On a Snowy Christmas Night	Stanley J. Gelber	1971	Elvis sings The Wonderful World of Christmas	
On the Jericho Road	Donald S. McCrossan, Marguerete McCrossan	1956	The Complete Million Dollar Session	
On Top of Old Smokey	Traditional	1961	Follow That Dream (FTD extended edition)	
Once Is Enough	Sid Tepper, Roy C. Bennett	1963	Kissin' Cousins	
One Boy, Two Little Girls	Bill Giant, Bernie Baum, Florence Kaye	1963	Kissin' Cousins	
One Broken Heart for Sale	Otis Blackwell, Winfield Scott	1962	It Happened at the World's Fair	
One Night	Dave Bartholomew, Pearl King, Anita Steiman	1957	50,000,000 Elvis Fans Can't Be Wrong – Elvis' Gold Records Volume 2	
One-sided Love Affair	Bill Campbell	1956	Elvis Presley	
One Track Heart	Bernie Baum, Bill Giant, Florence Kaye	1964	Roustabout	
Only Believe	Paul Rader	1970	Love Letters from Elvis	
Only the Strong Survive	Kenny Gamble, Leon Huff, Jerry Butler	1969	From Elvis in Memphis	
Out Of Sight, Out Of Mind	Ivory Joe Hunter, Clyde Otis	1956	The Complete Million Dollar Session	
Padre	Jacques Larue, Paul Francis Webster, Alain Romans	1971	Elvis (1973 album)	
Paradise, Hawaiian Style	Bill Giant, Bernie Baum, Florence Kaye	1965	Paradise, Hawaiian Style	
Paralyzed	Otis Blackwell, Elvis Presley	1956	Elvis (1956 album)	
Party	Jessie Mae Robinson	1957	Loving You	
Patch It Up	Eddie Rabbitt, Rory Bourke	1970	That's the Way It Is	
(There'll Be) Peace in the Valley (For Me)	Thomas A. Dorsey	1957	Elvis' Christmas Album (original 1957 album)	
Peter Gunn Theme	Henry Mancini	1968	The Complete '68 Comeback Special	
Petunia, the Gardener's Daughter	Roy C. Bennett, Sid Tepper	1965	Frankie and Johnny	
Pieces of My Life	Troy Seals	1975	Today	
Plantation Rock	Bill Giant, Bernie Baum, Florence Kaye	1962	Elvis: A Legendary Performer Volume 4	
Playing for Keeps	Stan Kesler	1956	For LP Fans Only	
Please Don't Drag That String Around	Otis Blackwell, Winfield Scott	1963	Elvis' Gold Records Volume 4	
Please Don't Stop Loving Me	Joy Byers	1965	Frankie and Johnny	
Pledging My Love	Ferdinand Washington, Don Robey	1977	Moody Blue	
Pocketful of Rainbows	Ben Weisman, Fred Wise	1960	G.I. Blues	
Poison Ivy League	Bernie Baum, Bill Giant, Florence Kaye	1964	Roustabout	
Polk Salad Annie	Tony Joe White	1970	On Stage	
Poor Boy	Elvis Presley, Vera Matson	1956	For LP Fans Only	
Poor Man's Gold	Mac Davis	1969	Suspicious Minds	
Portrait of My Love	Norman Newell, Cyril Ornadel	1972	Stage Rehearsal	
Power of My Love	Bill Giant, Bernie Baum, Florence Kaye	1969	From Elvis in Memphis	
Promised Land	Chuck Berry	1973	Promised Land	
Proud Mary	John Fogerty	1970	On Stage	
Puppet on a String	Sid Tepper, Roy C. Bennett	1964	Girl Happy	
Put the Blame on Me	Kay Twomey, Fred Wise, Norman Blagman	1961	Something for Everybody	
Put Your Hand in the Hand	Gene MacLellan	1971	Elvis Now	
Queenie Wahine's Papaya	Bill Giant, Bernie Baum, Florence Kaye	1965	Paradise, Hawaiian Style	
Rags to Riches	Richard Adler, Jerry Ross	1970	Elvis Aron Presley	
Raised on Rock	Mark James	1973	Raised on Rock	
Reach Out to Jesus	Ralph Carmichael	1971	He Touched Me	
Ready Teddy	Robert Blackwell and John Marascalco	1956	Elvis (1956 album)	
Reconsider Baby	Lowell Fulson	1960	Elvis Is Back!	
Relax	Sid Tepper, Roy C. Bennett	1962	It Happened at the World's Fair	
Release Me	Eddie Miller, James Pebworth, Robert Yount	1970	On Stage	
Return to Sender	Otis Blackwell, Winfield Scott	1962	Girls! Girls! Girls!	
Riding the Rainbow	Fred Wise, Ben Weisman	1961	I Got Lucky	
Rip It Up	Robert Blackwell and John Marascalco	1956	Elvis (1956 album)	
Rock-A-Hula Baby	Ben Weisman, Fred Wise, Dolores Fuller	1961	Blue Hawaii	
Roustabout	Bill Giant, Bernie Baum, Florence Kaye	1964	Roustabout	
Rubberneckin'	Dory Jones, Bunny Warren	1969	Almost in Love	
Run On	Traditional	1966	How Great Thou Art	
Runaway	Max Crook, Del Shannon	1969	On Stage	
San Antonio Rose	Bob Wills	1966	The Home Recordings	
Sand Castles	Herb Goldberg, David Hess	1965	Paradise, Hawaiian Style	
Santa Claus Is Back in Town	Jerry Leiber and Mike Stoller	1957	Elvis' Christmas Album	
Santa Lucia	Teodoro Cottrau	1963	Elvis for Everyone!	
Santa Bring My Baby Back (To Me)	Aaron Schroeder, Claude Demetrius	1957	Elvis' Christmas Album	
Saved	Jerry Leiber and Mike Stoller	1968	Elvis (1968 NBC-TV Special)	
Scratch My Back	Bill Giant, Bernie Baum, Florence Kaye	1965	Paradise, Hawaiian Style	
See See Rider	Traditional	1970	On Stage	
Seeing Is Believing	Red West, Glen Spreen	1971	He Touched Me	
Send Me Some Lovin'	John S. Marascalso, Leo Price	1959	A Date with Elvis (FTD Extended Album)	
Sentimental Me	James Cassin, James T. Morehead	1961	Something for Everybody	
Separate Ways	Red West, Richard Mainegra	1972	Separate Ways	
Shake a Hand	Joe Morris	1975	Today	
Shake, Rattle and Roll	Charles Calhoun	1956	For LP Fans Only	
Shake That Tambourine	Bernie Baum, Bill Giant, Florence Kaye	1965	Harum Scarum	
She Thinks I Still Care	Dickey Lee, Steve Duffy	1976	Moody Blue	
She Wears My Ring	Felice and Boudleaux Bryant	1973	Good Times	
She's a Machine	Fred Wise, Ben Weisman	1966	Elvis Sings Flaming Star	
She's Not You	Doc Pomus, Jerry Leiber and Mike Stoller	1962	Elvis' Golden Records Volume 3	
Shoppin' Around	Aaron Schroeder, Sid Tepper, Roy C. Bennett	1960	G.I. Blues	
Shout It Out	Bernie Baum, Bill Giant, Florence Kaye	1965	Frankie and Johnny	
Show Me Thy Ways, O Lord	Hazel Shade	1966	The Home Recordings	
Signs of the Zodiac	Buddy Kaye, Ben Weisman	1968	Double Features: Live a Little, Love a Little/Charro!/The Trouble With Girls/Change of Habit	
Silent Night	Joseph Mohr, Franz Gruber	1957	Elvis' Christmas Album	
Silver Bells	Jay Livingston, Ray Evans	1971	Elvis sings The Wonderful World of Christmas	
Sing You Children	Fred Burch, Gerald Nelson	1966	You'll Never Walk Alone	
Singing Tree	A. L. Owens, A.C. Solberg	1967	Clambake	
Slicin' Sand	Sid Tepper, Roy C. Bennett	1961	Blue Hawaii	
Slowly But Surely	Ben Weisman, Sid Wayne	1963	Fun in Acapulco	
Smokey Mountain Boy	Lenore Rosenblatt, Victor Millrose	1963	Kissin' Cousins	
Smorgasbord	Sid Tepper, Roy C. Bennett	1966	Spinout	
Snowbird	Gene MacLellan	1970	Elvis Country (I'm 10,000 Years Old)	
So Close, Yet So Far (From Paradise)	Joy Byers	1965	Harum Scarum	
So Glad You're Mine	Arthur Crudup	1956	Elvis (1956 album)	
So High	Traditional	1966	How Great Thou Art	
Softly and Tenderly	Will L. Thompson	1956	The Complete Million Dollar Session	
Softly As I Leave You	Giorgio Calabrese, Antonio De Vita and Hal Shaper	1974	Elvis Aron Presley	
Soldier Boy	David Jones, Theodore Williams Jr.	1960	Elvis Is Back!	
Solitaire	Neil Sedaka, Phil Cody	1976	From Elvis Presley Boulevard, Memphis Tennessee	
Somebody Bigger Than You and I	Hy Heath, Sonny Burke, Johnny Lange	1966	How Great Thou Art	
Something Blue	Paul Evans, Al Byron	1962	Pot Luck	
Something	George Harrison	1970	Walk a Mile in My Shoes: The Essential 70's Masters	
Song of the Shrimp	Sid Tepper, Roy C. Bennett	1962	Girls! Girls! Girls!	
Sound Advice	Bill Giant, Bernie Baum, Florence Kaye	1961	Elvis for Everyone!	
The Sound of Your Cry	Bill Giant, Bernie Baum, Buddy Kaye	1970	Elvis: Greatest Hits Volume 1	
Spanish Eyes	Bert Kaempfert, Eddie Snyder, Charles Singleton	1973	Good Times	
Speedway	Mel Glazer, Stephen Schlaks	1967	Speedway	
Spinout	Ben Weisman, Dolores Fuller, Sid Wayne	1966	Spinout	
Spring Fever	Bernie Baum, Bill Giant, Florence Kaye	1964	Girl Happy	
Stand by Me	Traditional	1966	How Great Thou Art	
Startin' Tonight	Lenore Rosenblatt, Victor Millrose	1964	Girl Happy	
Starting Today	Don Robertson	1961	Something for Everybody	
Stay Away	Sid Tepper, Roy C. Bennett	1968	Almost in Love	
Stay Away, Joe	Ben Weisman, Sid Wayne	1967	Let's Be Friends	
Steadfast, Loyal and True	Jerry Leiber and Mike Stoller	1958	King Creole	
Steamroller Blues	James Taylor	1973	Aloha from Hawaii via Satellite	
Steppin' Out of Line	Fred Wise, Ben Weisman, Dolores Fuller	1961	Pot Luck	
Stop, Look and Listen	Joy Byers	1966	Spinout	
Stop Where You Are	Bill Giant, Bernie Baum, Florence Kaye	1965	Paradise, Hawaiian Style	
Stranger In My Own Home Town	Percy Mayfield	1969	From Memphis to Vegas / From Vegas to Memphis (Back in Memphis)	
Stranger in the Crowd	Winfield Scott	1970	That's the Way It Is	
Stuck on You	Aaron Schroeder, J. Leslie McFarland	1960	Elvis' Golden Records Volume 3	
Such a Night	Lincoln Chase	1960	Elvis Is Back!	
(Such an) Easy Question	Otis Blackwell, Winfield Scott	1962	Pot Luck	
Summer Kisses, Winter Tears	Ben Weisman, Fred Wise, Jack Lloyd	1960	Elvis for Everyone!	
Summertime Has Passed and Gone	Bill Monroe	1956	The Complete Million Dollar Session	
Suppose	Sylvia Dee, George Goehring	1967	Speedway	
Surrender	Doc Pomus, Mort Shuman	1960	Elvis' Golden Records Volume 3	
Susan When She Tried	Don Reid	1975	Today	
Suspicion	Doc Pomus, Mort Shuman	1962	Pot Luck	
Suspicious Minds	Mark James	1969	Worldwide 50 Gold Award Hits Volume 1	
Sweet Angeline	Chris Arnold, Geoff Morrow, David Martin	1973	Raised on Rock	
Sweet Caroline	Neil Diamond	1970	On Stage	
Sweet Inspiration	Dan Penn, Spooner Oldham	1970	N/A	
Sweet Leilani	Harry Owens	1960	In a Private Moment	
Sweetheart, You Done Me Wrong	Bill Monroe	1956	The Complete Million Dollar Session	
Swing Down Sweet Chariot	Traditional	1960	His Hand in Mine	
Sylvia	Geoff Stephens, Les Reed	1970	Elvis Now	
Take Good Care of Her	Ed Warren, Arthur Kent	1973	Good Times	
Take Me to the Fair	Sid Tepper, Roy C. Bennett	1962	It Happened at the World's Fair	
Take My Hand, Precious Lord	Thomas A. Dorsey	1957	Elvis' Christmas Album (original 1957 album)	
Talk About the Good Times	Jerry Reed	1973	Good Times	
Tell Me Why	Titus Turner	1957	The Other Sides – Elvis Worldwide Gold Award Hits Vol. 2	
Tender Feeling	Bill Giant, Bernie Baum, Florence Kaye	1963	Kissin' Cousins	
Tennessee Waltz	Redd Stewart, Pee Wee King	1967	Platinum: A Life in Music	
Thanks to the Rolling Sea	Bill Giant, Bernie Baum, Florence Kaye	1962	Girls! Girls! Girls!	
That's All Right	Arthur Crudup	1954	For LP Fans Only	
That's My Desire	Helmy Kresa, Carroll Loveday	1956	The Complete Million Dollar Session	
That's Someone You Never Forget	Elvis Presley, Red West	1961	Pot Luck	
(That's What You Get) For Lovin' Me	Gordon Lightfoot	1971	Elvis (1973 album)	
That's When Your Heartaches Begin	Fred Fisher, William Raskin, Billy Hill	1953	Elvis' Golden Records	
There Ain't Nothing Like a Song (with Nancy Sinatra)	Joy Byers, Bob Johnston	1967	Speedway	
There Goes My Everything	Dallas Frazier	1970	Elvis Country (I'm 10,000 Years Old)	
There Is No God But God	Bill Kenny	1971	He Touched Me	
There Is So Much World to See	Randy Starr	1966	Double Trouble	
There's a Brand New Day on the Horizon	Joy Byers	1964	Roustabout	
There's a Honky Tonk Angel (Who'll Take Me Back In)	Troy Seals, Danny Rice	1973	Promised Land	
There's Always Me	Don Robertson	1961	Something for Everybody	
There's Gold in the Mountains	Bernie Baum, Bill Giant, Florence Kaye	1963	Kissin' Cousins	
There's No Place Like Home	Henry Bishop, John Payne	1956	The Complete Million Dollar Session	
There's No Tomorrow	Al Hoffman, Leo Corday, Leon Carr	1959	Platinum: A Life in Music	
They Remind Me Too Much of You	Don Robertson	1962	It Happened at the World's Fair	
A Thing Called Love	Jerry Reed	1971	He Touched Me	
Thinking About You	Tim Baty	1973	Promised Land	
This Is Living	Fred Wise, Ben Weisman	1961	C'mon Everybody	
This Is My Heaven	Bill Giant, Bernie Baum, Florence Kaye	1965	Paradise, Hawaiian Style	
This Is Our Dance	Les Reed, Geoff Stephens	1970	Love Letters from Elvis	
This Is the Story	Chris Arnold, Geoff Morrow, David Martin	1969	From Memphis to Vegas / From Vegas to Memphis (Back in Memphis)	
This Time	Chips Moman	1969	From Nashville to Memphis: The Essential '60s Masters	
Three Corn Patches	Jerry Leiber and Mike Stoller	1973	Raised on Rock	
Thrill of Your Love	Stan Kesler	1960	Elvis Is Back!	
Tiger Man	Joe Hill Louis, Sam Phillips (under the pseudonym Sam Burns)	1968	Elvis Sings Flaming Star	
The Titles Will Tell	Charles Underwood	1959	In a Private Moment	
Today, Tomorrow and Forever	Bill Giant, Bernie Baum, Florence Kaye	1963	C'mon Everybody	
Tomorrow Is a Long Time	Bob Dylan	1966	Spinout	
Tomorrow Never Comes	Ernest Tubb, Johnny Bond	1970	Elvis Country (I'm 10,000 Years Old)	
Tomorrow Night	Sam Coslow, Wilhelm Grosz	1954	Elvis for Everyone!	
Tonight Is So Right for Love	Abner Silver, Sid Wayne	1960	G.I. Blues	
Tonight's All Right for Love	Abner Silver, Sid Wayne, Joseph Lilley	1960	Elvis: A Legendary Performer Volume 1	
Too Much	Lee Rosenberg and Bernard Weinman	1956	Elvis' Golden Records	
Too Much Monkey Business	Chuck Berry	1968	Elvis Sings Flaming Star	
Treat Me Nice	Jerry Leiber and Mike Stoller	1957	Elvis' Golden Records	
T-R-O-U-B-L-E	Jerry Chesnut	1975	Today	
Trouble	Jerry Leiber and Mike Stoller	1958	King Creole	
True Love	Cole Porter	1957	Loving You	
True Love Travels on a Gravel Road	A. L. Owens, Dallas Frazier	1969	From Elvis in Memphis	
Tryin' to Get to You	Rose Marie McCoy, Charles Singleton	1955	Elvis Presley	
Tumbling Tumbleweeds	Bob Nolan	1966	The Home Recordings	
Turn Around, Look at Me	Jerry Capehart	1971	In Dreams of Yesterday	
Turn Your Eyes Upon Jesus	Helen Howarth Lemmel	1972	Amazing Grace: His Greatest Sacred Performances	
Tutti Frutti	Dorothy LaBostrie, Richard Penniman	1956	Elvis Presley	
Tweedle Dee	Winfield Scott	1955	The Beginning Years, 1954 to '56	
The Twelfth of Never	Paul Francis Webster, Jay Livingston	1974	Walk a Mile in My Shoes: The Essential 70's Masters	
Twenty Days and Twenty Nights	Ben Weisman, Clive Westlake	1970	That's the Way It Is	
U.S. Male	Jerry Reed	1968	Almost in Love	
Unchained Melody	Alex North, Hy Zaret	1977	Moody Blue	
Until It's Time for You to Go	Buffy Sainte-Marie	1971	Elvis Now	
Until Then	Stuart Hamblen	1976	Slippin' 'n' Slidin'	
Up Above My Head	Traditional	1968	Elvis (1968 NBC-TV Special)	
Vino, Dinero y Amor	Sid Tepper, Roy C. Bennett	1963	Fun in Acapulco	
Violet	Steven Dueker, Peter Lohstroh	1968	Double Features: Live A Little, Love A Little/Charro!/The Trouble With Girls/Change of Habit	
Viva Las Vegas	Doc Pomus, Mort Shuman	1963	Worldwide 50 Gold Award Hits Volume 1	
Walk a Mile in My Shoes	Joe South	1970	On Stage	
Jesus Walked That Lonesome Valley	Traditional	1956	The Complete Million Dollar Session	
The Walls Have Ears	Sid Tepper, Roy C. Bennett	1962	Girls! Girls! Girls!	
Wasted Years	Wally Fowler	1973	Essential Elvis Volume 5: Elvis Rhythm and Country	
Way Down	Layng Martine, Jr.	1977	Moody Blue	
We Call on Him	Fred Karger, Sid Wayne, Ben Weisman	1967	You'll Never Walk Alone	
We Can Make the Morning	Jay Ramsey	1971	Elvis Now	
Wear My Ring Around Your Neck	Bert Carroll, Russell Moody	1958	50,000,000 Elvis Fans Can't Be Wrong – Elvis' Gold Records Volume 2	
Wearin' That Loved-On Look	Dallas Frazier, A. L. Owens	1969	From Elvis in Memphis	
Welcome to My World	Ray Winkler, John Hathcock	1973	Aloha from Hawaii via Satellite	
We'll Be Together	Charles O'Curran, Dudley Brooks	1962	Girls! Girls! Girls!	
We're Comin' In Loaded	Otis Blackwell, Winfield Scott	1962	Girls! Girls! Girls!	
We're Gonna Move	Elvis Presley, Vera Matson	1956	A Date with Elvis	
Western Union	Sid Tepper, Roy C. Bennett	1963	Speedway	
What a Wonderful Life	Sid Wayne, Jerry Livingston	1961	I Got Lucky	
What Every Woman Lives For	Doc Pomus, Mort Shuman	1965	Frankie and Johnny	
What Now My Love	Gilbert Bécaud, Pierre Delanoë, Carl Sigman	1973	Aloha from Hawaii via Satellite	
What Now, What Next, Where To	Hal Blair, Don Robertson	1963	Double Trouble	
What'd I Say	Ray Charles	1963	Elvis' Gold Records Volume 4	
What's She Really Like	Abner Silver, Sid Wayne	1960	G.I. Blues	
Wheels on My Heels	Sid Tepper, Roy C. Bennett	1964	Roustabout	
When God Dips His Love In My Heart	Cleavant Derricks	1956	The Complete Million Dollar Session	
When I'm Over You	Shirl Milete	1970	Love Letters from Elvis	
When It Rains, It Really Pours	William Emerson	1957	Elvis for Everyone!	
When My Blue Moon Turns to Gold Again	Gene Sullivan, Wiley Walker	1956	Elvis (1956 album)	
When the Saints Go Marching In	Traditional	1965	Frankie and Johnny	
When the Snow Is on the Roses	Ernst Bader, Larry Kusik, Eddie Snyder	1970	Live in Las Vegas	
When the Swallows Come Back to Capistrano	Leon René	1960	In a Private Moment	
Where Could I Go but to the Lord?	James B. Coats	1966	How Great Thou Art	
Where Did They Go, Lord?	Dallas Frazier, A. L. "Doodle" Owens	1970	He Walks Beside Me	
Where Do I Go from Here?	Paul Williams	1972	Elvis (1973 album)	
Where Do You Come From?	Ruth Batchelor, Bob Roberts	1962	Girls! Girls! Girls!	
Where No One Stands Alone	Mosie Lister	1966	How Great Thou Art	
The Whiffenpoof Song	Guy Sculls, Meade Minnigerode, George S. Pomeroy	1968	Double Features: Live A Little, Love A Little/Charro!/The Trouble With Girls/Change of Habit	
A Whistling Tune	Sherman Edwards, Hal David	1961	C'mon Everybody	
White Christmas	Irving Berlin	1957	Elvis' Christmas Album	
Who Am I?	Charles "Rusty" Goodman	1969	You'll Never Walk Alone	
Who Are You (Who Am I)	Sid Wayne, Ben Weisman	1967	Speedway	
Who Needs Money?	Randy Starr	1967	Clambake	
Whole Lotta Shakin' Goin' On	Dave "Curlee" Williams, Sunny David	1970	Elvis Country (I'm 10,000 Years Old)	
Who's Sorry Now?	Ted Snyder, Bert Kalmar, Harry Ruby	1958	N/A	
Why Me, Lord?	Kris Kristofferson	1974	Elvis Recorded Live on Stage in Memphis	
Wild in the Country	George David Weiss, Hugo Peretti, Luigi Creatore	1960	The Other Sides – Elvis Worldwide Gold Award Hits Vol. 2	
Winter Wonderland	Richard B. Smith, Felix Bernard	1971	Elvis sings The Wonderful World of Christmas	
Wisdom of the Ages	Bernie Baum, Bill Giant, Florence Kaye	1965	Harum Scarum	
Witchcraft (1)	Carolyn Leigh, Cy Coleman	1960	From Nashville to Memphis: The Essential 60's Masters	
Witchcraft (2)	Dave Bartholomew, Pearl King	1963	Elvis' Gold Records Volume 4	
Without a Song	Vincent Youmans, Billy Rose, Edward Eliscu	1971	Platinum: A Life in Music	
Without Him	Mylon LeFevre	1966	How Great Thou Art	
Without Love (There Is Nothing)	Danny Small	1969	From Memphis to Vegas / From Vegas to Memphis (Back in Memphis)	
Wolf Call	Bernie Baum, Bill Giant, Florence Kaye	1964	Girl Happy	
Woman Without Love	Jerry Chesnut	1975	Today	
The Wonder of You	Baker Knight	1970	On Stage	
Wonderful World	Guy Fletcher, Doug Flett	1968	Elvis Sings Flaming Star	
The Wonderful World of Christmas	Charles Tobias, Al Frisch	1971	Elvis sings The Wonderful World of Christmas	
Wooden Heart	Ben Weisman, Fred Wise, Kay Twomey, Bert Kaempfert	1960	G.I. Blues	
Words	Robin Gibb, Barry Gibb, Maurice Gibb	1969	From Memphis to Vegas / From Vegas to Memphis (In Person at the International Hotel, Las Vegas)	
A World of Our Own	Bill Giant, Bernie Baum, Florence Kaye	1962	It Happened at the World's Fair	
Working on the Building	Lillian Bowles, Winifred O. Hoyle	1960	His Hand in Mine	
Write to Me from Naples	Jimmy Kennedy, Alex Alstone	1966	A Golden Celebration	
The Yellow Rose of Texas	Fred Wise, Randy Starr	1963	Elvis Sings Flaming Star	
Yesterday	John Lennon and Paul McCartney	1969	On Stage	
Yoga is as Yoga Does	Gerald Nelson, Fred Burch	1966	I Got Lucky	
You Asked Me To	Waylon Jennings, Billy Joe Shaver	1973	Promised Land	
You Belong to My Heart	Agustin Lara, Ray Gilbert	1956	The Complete Million Dollar Session	
You Better Run	Traditional	1972	Amazing Grace: His Greatest Sacred Performances	
You Can Have Her	Bill Cook	1974	Live in L.A.	
You Can't Say No in Acapulco	Sid Feller, Dolores Fuller, Lee Morris	1963	Fun in Acapulco	
You Don't Have to Say You Love Me	Vicki Wickham, Simon Napier-Bell, Pino Donaggio, Vito Pallavicini	1970	That's the Way It Is	
You Don't Know Me	Cindy Walker, Eddy Arnold	1967	Clambake	
You Gave Me a Mountain	Marty Robbins	1973	Aloha from Hawaii via Satellite	
You Gotta Stop	Bill Giant, Bernie Baum, Florence Kaye	1966	I Got Lucky	
You'll Be Gone	Elvis Presley, Charlie Hodge, Red West	1962	Girl Happy	
You'll Never Walk Alone	Richard Rodgers, Oscar Hammerstein II	1967	You'll Never Walk Alone	
You'll Think of Me	Mort Shuman	1969	From Memphis to Vegas / From Vegas to Memphis (Back in Memphis)	
Young and Beautiful	Aaron Schroeder, Abner Silver	1957	A Date with Elvis	
Young Dreams	Aaron Schroeder, Martin Kalmanoff	1958	King Creole	
Young Love	Ric Cartey, Carole Joyner	1968	The Complete '68 Comeback Special	
Your Cheatin' Heart	Hank Williams	1958	Elvis for Everyone!	
Your Love's Been a Long Time Coming	Rory Bourke	1973	Promised Land	
Your Mama Don't Dance	Kenny Loggins, Jim Messina	1974	Elvis Recorded Live on Stage in Memphis	
Your Time Hasn't Come Yet, Baby	Joel Hirschhorn, Al Kasha	1967	Speedway	
You're a Heartbreaker	Jack Sallee	1954	For LP Fans Only	
(You're So Square) Baby I Don't Care	Jerry Leiber and Mike Stoller	1957	A Date with Elvis	
You're the Boss (with Ann-Margret)	Jerry Leiber and Mike Stoller	1963	Collectors Gold	
(You're the) Devil in Disguise	Bernie Baum, Bill Giant, Florence Kaye	1963	Elvis' Gold Records Volume 4	
You're the Reason I'm Living	Bobby Darin	1975	Live in Las Vegas	
You've Lost That Lovin' Feelin'	Barry Mann, Cynthia Weil, Phil Spector	1970	That's the Way It Is	
