= Command Performances: The Essential 60s Masters II =

Compilation album by Elvis Presley
- Released: July 18, 1995
- Recorded: April 1960 – March 1969
- Genre: Rock
- Label: RCA Records
- Producer: Ernst Jorgensen; Roger Semon

Elvis Presley chronology
Amazing Grace: His Greatest Sacred Performances (1994)	Command Performances: The Essential 60s Masters II (1995)	Walk a Mile in My Shoes: The Essential '70s Masters (1995)

Professional ratings
Review scores
Source	Rating
AllMusic	3.5/5 stars
MusicHound	4/5 stars
The Rolling Stone Album Guide	4/5 stars

Command Performances: The Essential 60s Masters II is a two-disc compilation of studio master recordings by American singer and musician Elvis Presley during the decade of the 1960s, released in 1995 on RCA Records, catalogue number 66601-2. It also includes a booklet with session details and an essay by Susan M. Doll.

== Contents ==
The set comprises a selection of recordings made by Presley during the decade specifically at a session for the soundtrack of a feature film, of which Presley made 27 during the 1960s. Excluded are all other studio recordings from the decade, as well as those for his 1968 television special and the 1969 live recordings. These soundtrack songs, of which 211 were released in Presley's lifetime, originally appeared in a variety of formats: on 15 full-length long-playing albums, five EPs, and numerous singles. Of the 211, 23 were released on later compilations, both standard and budget, while two tracks were used to bring up the running times respectively of Something for Everybody and Pot Luck. All of Elvis' 1960s movies are represented by at least one song in this set with the exception of Tickle Me, its EP soundtrack consisting of five previously issued studio recordings, all of which were included on the box set first volume of the Essential '60s Masters.

The two discs present the studio masters in rough chronological session order. Two previously unreleased masters appear: a version of the Eddy Arnold song "You Don't Know Me" recorded during the sessions for the movie Clambake; and an alternate take of the song "Follow That Dream" as the stereo master for the original has been lost, and the compilers opted not to use the surviving mono master. The songs "Can't Help Falling in Love" and "Rock-A-Hula Baby" were released as, respectively, the A-side and b-side of a single following the release of the Blue Hawaii album, and went to #2 and #23 on the Billboard Pop Singles chart. "Puppet on a String" appeared as a single seven months after the release of the Girl Happy soundtrack, backed with "Wooden Heart" from G.I. Blues, and peaked at #14 on the singles chart. "Wooden Heart" had also been released as the flipside to a reissue of "Blue Christmas" eleven months earlier.

RCA issued a box set for the complete non-gospel songs that were not recorded at soundtrack sessions during the decade, From Nashville to Memphis: The Essential 60s Masters, and released a similar two-disc set for the gospel recordings in 1994, Amazing Grace: His Greatest Sacred Performances.

== Purpose ==
Generally, Presley's 1960s soundtrack recordings command the least regard among the singer's recorded work. The most successful commercially, such as G.I. Blues and Blue Hawaii, fell in the tradition of the film musical as it had developed through the 1950s, that of the integrated musical where the songs propel and inform the story line. Hence, songs such as "Fort Lauderdale Chamber of Commerce" from Girl Happy or "There's No Room to Rhumba in A Sports Car" from Fun in Acapulco made no sense outside of their movies and hardly found a place in Presley's stage act, or could ever be considered classics along the lines of "Jailhouse Rock" or "Love Me Tender", whose films were not integrated musicals. As stated by Susan Doll in the liner notes, the songs from the soundtracks are often judged by inappropriate criteria:

...this type of (integrated) musical was standard fare in Hollywood for decades. However, those who criticize Elvis' musical vehicles generally overlook this, preferring to attack the songs as being inferior to his non-movie output...

This package, collecting 62 of the songs released on record in association with the films, selects in many cases those numbers that can stand outside of their film vehicles, concentrating on title tracks and songs that had been also released as singles immediately prior to the release of the soundtrack.

All selections recorded at Radio Recorders, Western Recorders, Paramount Recording Stage, MGM Studios, Samuel Goldwyn Studio, United Artist Recorders, Decca Universal Studio, and RCA Studios in Hollywood, RCA Studio B in Nashville, Tennessee. Original recordings produced by Joseph Lilley, Urban Thielmann, Hans Salter, Jeff Alexander, George Stoll, Gene Nelson, Fred Karger, Felton Jarvis, Billy Strange, Hugo Montenegro, Billy Goldenberg, and Leith Stevens. Discographical information below taken from Elvis Presley A Life in Music: The Complete Recording Sessions, by Ernst Jorgensen, St. Martin's Press, New York, 1998.

== Track listing ==
Chart positions for LPs from Billboard Top Pop Albums chart; positions for singles and EPs from Billboard Pop Singles chart. By late 1968, Billboard discontinued charting B-sides. Titles listed without corresponding LP/EP designation were initially released as singles only.

=== Disc one ===
Track	Song title	Writer(s)	Time	Recorded	Release date	Original LP/EP Issue	Catalogue	Chart peak	Film
1.	"G.I. Blues"	Roy C. Bennett, Sid Tepper	2:37	1960-04-27	1960-10-01	G.I. Blues	LSP 2256	#1	G.I. Blues
2.	"Wooden Heart"	Fred Wise, Ben Weisman	2:02	1960-04-28	1960-10-01	G.I. Blues	LSP 2256	#1	G.I. Blues
3.	"Shoppin' Around"	Roy C. Bennett, Sid Tepper, Aaron Schroeder	2:22	1960-05-06	1960-10-01	G.I. Blues	LSP 2256	#1	G.I. Blues
4.	"Doin' the Best I Can"	Doc Pomus, Mort Shuman	3:10	1960-04-27	1960-10-01	G.I. Blues	LSP 2256	#1	G.I. Blues
5.	"Flaming Star"	Sid Wayne, Sherman Edwards	2:25	1960-10-07	1961–02	Flaming Star	LPC 128	#14	Flaming Star
6.	"Wild in the Country"	George Weiss, Hugo Peretti, Luigi Creatore	1:52	1960-11-07	1961-05-02		47-7880b	#26	Wild in the Country
7.	"Lonely Man"	Bennie Benjamin, Sol Marcus	2:43	1960-11-07	1961-02-07		47-7850b	#32	Wild in the Country
8.	"Blue Hawaii"	Leo Robin, Ralph Rainger	2:34	1961-03-22	1961-10-01	Blue Hawaii	LSP 2426	#1	Blue Hawaii
9.	"Rock-A-Hula Baby"	Fred Wise, Ben Weisman, Dolores Fuller	1:57	1961-03-23	1961-10-01	Blue Hawaii	LSP 2426	#1	Blue Hawaii
10.	"Can't Help Falling In Love"	George Weiss, Hugo Peretti, Luigi Creatore	2:59	1961-03-23	1961-10-01	Blue Hawaii	LSP 2426	#1	Blue Hawaii
11.	"Beach Boy Blues"	Roy C. Bennett, Sid Tepper	2:02	1961-03-23	1961-10-01	Blue Hawaii	LSP 2426	#1	Blue Hawaii
12.	"Hawaiian Wedding Song"	Charles E. King, Al Hoffman, Dick Manning	2:48	1961-03-23	1961-10-01	Blue Hawaii	LSP 2426	#1	Blue Hawaii
13.	"Follow That Dream"	Fred Wise, Ben Weisman	1:37	1961-07-02		previously unreleased			Follow That Dream
14.	"Angel"	Roy C. Bennett, Sid Tepper	2:38	1961-07-02	1962–04	Follow That Dream	EPA 4368	#15	Follow That Dream
15.	"King of the Whole Wide World"	Ruth Batchelor, Bob Roberts	2:06	1961-10-27	1962–08	Kid Galahad	EPA 4371	#30	Kid Galahad
16.	"I Got Lucky"	Fred Wise, Dolores Fuller, Ben Weisman	1:55	1961-10-27	1962–08	Kid Galahad	EPA 4371	#30	Kid Galahad
17.	"Girls! Girls! Girls!"	Jerry Leiber, Mike Stoller	2:31	1962-03-27	1962-11-09	Girls! Girls! Girls!	LSP 2621	#3	Girls! Girls! Girls!
18.	"Because of Love"	Ruth Batchelor, Bob Roberts	2:31	1962-03-27	1962-11-09	Girls! Girls! Girls!	LSP 2621	#3	Girls! Girls! Girls!
19.	"Return to Sender"	Otis Blackwell, Winfield Scott	2:06	1962-03-27	1962-10-02	Girls! Girls! Girls!	47-8100	#2	Girls! Girls! Girls!
20.	"One Broken Heart for Sale"	Otis Blackwell, Winfield Scott	1:46	1962-09-22	1963-01-29	World's Fair	47-8134	#11	World's Fair
21.	"I'm Falling In Love Tonight"	Don Robertson	1:39	1962-09-22	1963-04-10	World's Fair	LSP 2697	#53	World's Fair
22.	"They Remind Me Too Much of You"	Don Robertson	2:31	1962-09-22	1963-01-29	World's Fair	47-8134b	#53	World's Fair
23.	"Fun in Acapulco"	Ben Weisman, Sid Wayne	2:28	1963-01-23	1963-11-01	Fun in Acapulco	LSP 2756	#3	Fun in Acapulco
24.	"Bossa Nova Baby"	Jerry Leiber, Mike Stoller	2:02	1963-01-22	1963-10-01	Fun in Acapulco	47-8243	#8	Fun in Acapulco
25.	"Marguerita"	Don Robertson	2:42	1963-01-22	1963-11-01	Fun in Acapulco	LSP 2756	#3	Fun in Acapulco
26.	"Mexico"	Roy C. Bennett, Sid Tepper	1:58	1963-01-22	1963-11-01	Fun in Acapulco	LSP 2756	#3	Fun in Acapulco
27.	"Kissin' Cousins"	Fred Wise, Randy Starr	2:12	1963-09-30	1964-02-10	Kissin' Cousins	47-8307	#12	Kissin' Cousins
28.	"One Boy, Two Little Girls"	Bernie Baum, Bill Giant, Florence Kaye	2:31	1963-09-29	1964-04-02	Kissin' Cousins	LSP 2894	#6	Kissin' Cousins
29.	"Once Is Enough"	Roy C. Bennett, Sid Tepper	2:16	1963-09-29	1964-04-02	Kissin' Cousins	LSP 2894	#6	Kissin' Cousins
30.	"Viva Las Vegas"	Doc Pomus, Mort Shuman	2:20	1963-07-10	1964-04-28	Viva Las Vegas	47-8360b	#29	Viva Las Vegas
31.	"What'd I Say"	Ray Charles	3:02	1963-08-30	1964-04-28	Viva Las Vegas	47-8360	#21	Viva Las Vegas

=== Disc two ===
Track	Song title	Writer(s)	Time	Recorded	Release date	Original LP/EP Issue	Catalogue	Chart peak	Film
1.	"Roustabout"	Bernie Baum, Bill Giant, Florence Kaye	1:56	1964-04-29	1964-10-20	Roustabout	LSP 2999	#1	Roustabout
2.	"Poison Ivy League"	Bernie Baum, Bill Giant, Florence Kaye	2:02	1964-03-02	1964-10-20	Roustabout	LSP 2999	#1	Roustabout
3.	"Little Egypt"	Jerry Leiber, Mike Stoller	2:15	1964-03-02	1964-10-20	Roustabout	LSP 2999	#1	Roustabout
4.	"There's a Brand New Day on the Horizon"	Joy Byers	2:00	1964-03-03	1964-10-20	Roustabout	LSP 2999	#1	Roustabout
5.	"Girl Happy"	Doc Pomus, Norman Meade	2:07	1964-06-10	1965-03-01	Girl Happy	LSP 3338	#8	Girl Happy
6.	"Puppet on a String"	Roy C. Bennett, Sid Tepper	2:39	1964-06-10	1965-03-01	Girl Happy	LSP 3338	#8	Girl Happy
7.	"Do The Clam"	Ben Weisman, Sid Wayne, Dolores Fuller	3:20	1964-06-12	1965-02-09	Girl Happy	47-8500	#21	Girl Happy
8.	"Harem Holiday"	Peter Andreoli, Vini Poncia, Jimmie Crane	2:18	1965-02-26	1965-11-03	Harum Scarum	LSP 3468	#8	Harum Scarum
9.	"So Close, Yet So Far (From Paradise)"	Joy Byers	3:01	1965-02-25	1965-11-03	Harum Scarum	LSP 3468	#8	Harum Scarum
10.	"Frankie and Johnny"	Alex Gottlieb, Fred Karger, Ben Weisman	2:32	1965-05-14	1966-03-01	Frankie and Johnny	47-8780	#25	Frankie and Johnny
11.	"Please Don't Stop Loving Me"	Joy Byers	2:02	1965-05-13	1966-03-01	Frankie and Johnny	47-8780b	#45	Frankie and Johnny
12.	"Paradise, Hawaiian Style"	Bernie Baum, Bill Giant, Florence Kaye	2:37	1965-07-27	1966-06-10	Paradise, Hawaiian Style	LSP 3643	#15	Paradise, Hawaiian Style
13.	"This Is My Heaven"	Bernie Baum, Bill Giant, Florence Kaye	2:34	1965-07-27	1966-06-10	Paradise, Hawaiian Style	LSP 3643	#15	Paradise, Hawaiian Style
14.	"Spinout"	Ben Weisman, Sid Wayne, Dolores Fuller	2:32	1966-02-17	1966-09-13	Spinout	47-8941	#40	Spinout
15.	"All That I Am"	Roy C. Bennett, Sid Tepper	2:15	1966-02-17	1966-09-13	Spinout	47-8941b	#41	Spinout
16.	"I'll Be Back"	Ben Weisman, Sid Wayne	2:02	1966-02-17	1966-10-31	Spinout	LSP 3643	#18	Spinout
17.	"Easy Come, Easy Go"	Ben Weisman, Sid Wayne	2:08	1966-09-28	1967–03	Easy Come, Easy Go	EPA 4387		Easy Come, Easy Go
18.	"Double Trouble"	Doc Pomus, Mort Shuman	1:38	1966-06-29	1967-06-01	Double Trouble	LSP 3787	#47	Double Trouble
19.	"Long Legged Girl"	J. Leslie McFarland, Winfield Scott	1:27	1966-06-29	1967-04-28	Double Trouble	47-9115	#63	Double Trouble
20.	"Clambake"	Ben Weisman, Sid Wayne	2:35	1967-02-22	1967-10-10	Clambake	LSP 3893	#40	Clambake
21.	"You Don't Know Me"	Cindy Walker, Eddy Arnold	2:12	1967-02-21		previously unreleased			Clambake
22.	"Stay Away, Joe"	Ben Weisman, Sid Wayne	1:37	1967-10-01	1970–04	Let's Be Friends	CAS 2408	#105	Stay Away, Joe
23.	"Speedway"	Mel Glazer, Stephen Schlaks	2:15	1967-06-20	1968-05-01	Speedway	LSP 3989	#82	Speedway
24.	"Your Time Hasn't Come Yet Baby"	Joel Hirschhorn, Al Kasha	1:51	1967-06-20	1968-05-21	Speedway	47-9547	#72	Speedway
25.	"Let Yourself Go"	Joy Byers	2:58	1967-06-21	1968-05-21	Speedway	47-9547b	#71	Speedway
26.	"Almost in Love"	Luiz Bonfá, Randy Starr	3:01	1968-03-07	1968-09-03		47-9610b	#95	Live a Little, Love a Little
27.	"A Little Less Conversation"	Billy Strange, Mac Davis	2:10	1968-03-07	1968-09-03		47-9610	#69	Live a Little, Love a Little
28.	"Edge of Reality"	Bernie Baum, Bill Giant, Florence Kaye	3:33	1968-03-07	1968-11-05		47-9670b		Live a Little, Love a Little
29.	"Charro!"	Billy Strange, Mac Davis	2:44	1968-10-15	1969-02-25		47-9731b		Charro!
30.	"Clean Up Your Own Backyard"	Billy Strange, Mac Davis	3:07	1968-10-23	1969-06-17		47-9747	#35	The Trouble with Girls
31.	"Change of Habit"	Ben Weisman, Buddy Kaye	3:18	1969-03-05	1970–04	Let's Be Friends	CAS 2408	#105	Change of Habit

== Personnel ==
- Elvis Presley – vocals, guitar
- Scotty Moore – guitar
- Tiny Timbrell – guitar
- Howard Roberts – guitar
- Hank Garland – guitar
- Barney Kessell – guitar
- Billy Strange – guitar
- Tommy Tedesco – guitar
- Chip Young – guitar
- Neal Matthews – guitar
- Harold Bradley – guitar
- Joseph Gibbons – guitar
- Neil LeVang – guitar
- Charles Britz – guitar
- Al Casey – guitar
- Dennis Budimir – guitar
- Mike Deasy – guitar
- Jerry Kennedy – guitar
- Charlie McCoy – guitar, harmonica
- Alvino Rey – steel guitar
- Bernal Lewis – steel guitar
- Fred Tavares – ukulele
- Bernie Lewis – ukulele
- Cecil Brower – fiddle
- Gordon Terry – fiddle
- Floyd Cramer – piano
- Dudley Brooks – piano, organ
- Don Robertson – piano, organ
- Calvin Jackson – piano
- Larry Muhoberac – piano
- Don Randi – piano
- Hoyt Hawkins – tambourine
- Bob Moore – double bass, electric bass
- Ray Siegel – double bass
- Meyer Rubin – double bass
- Henry Strzelecki – bass
- Larry Knechtel – electric bass
- Charles Berghofer – double bass
- Max Bennett – bass
- Lyle Ritz – bass
- D.J. Fontana – drums
- Buddy Harman – drums
- Frank Bode (aka Uffe Baadh) – drums
- Bernie Mattinson – drums
- Hal Blaine – drums
- Frank Carlson – drums
- Kenny Buttrey – drums
- Carl O'Brian – drums
- John Guerin – drums
- Milt Holland – percussion
- Victor Feldman – percussion
- Emil Radocchia – percussion
- Gene Nelson – congas
- Jimmie Haskell – accordion
- Boots Randolph – saxophone, clarinet
- Clifford Scott – saxophone
- William Green – saxophone
- Steve Douglas – saxophone
- Bill Justis – saxophone
- Tony Terran – trumpet
- Rudolph Loera – trumpet
- James Zito – trumpet
- Herb Taylor -trombone
- Randall Miller – trombone
- Rufus Long – flute
- Ralph Stobel – oboe
- George Fields – harmonica
- The Jordanaires – backing vocals
- The Surfers – backing vocals
- The Mello Men – backing vocals
- The Amigos – backing vocals
- The Jubilee Four – backing vocals
- The Carole Lombard Trio – backing vocals
- Millie Kirkham – backing vocals
- Dolores Edgin – backing vocals
