= Roustabout (soundtrack) =

Soundtrack album by Elvis Presley
- Released: October 20, 1964
- Recorded: March 2 & 3, April 29, 1964
- Studio: Radio Recorders (Hollywood)
- Genre: Pop, rock and roll
- Length: 20:05
- Label: RCA Victor
- Producer: Joseph Lilley

Elvis Presley chronology
Viva Las Vegas (1964)	Roustabout (1964)	Girl Happy (1965)

Professional ratings
Review scores
Source	Rating
Allmusic	2/5 stars
Record Mirror	3/5 stars

Roustabout is the ninth soundtrack album by American singer and musician Elvis Presley, released on RCA Victor Records in mono and stereo, LPM/LSP 2999, in October 1964. It is the soundtrack to the 1964 film of the same name starring Presley. Recording sessions took place at Radio Recorders in Hollywood, California, on March 2 and 3, and April 29, 1964. It peaked at number one on the Billboard Top LPs chart. It was certified Gold on May 20, 1988, by the Recording Industry Association of America. The album would be Presley's final soundtrack to reach number one and his last number one album until 1973's Aloha From Hawaii: Via Satellite.

== Production ==
Payments to Presley for each film amounted to between $225,000 to $1,000,000 up front, often half the budget for production, with a 50% share of the profits. These movies were being shot in sometimes as little as three weeks, with the complete scoring and recording of the soundtrack albums taking no more than two weeks. It fell to Freddy Bienstock, the assistant of Presley's manager, Colonel Tom Parker, to ensure that the soundtrack songs fit into the profit equation with the publishing controlled by Elvis Presley Music or Gladys Music, the Hill and Range Publishing companies owned by Presley and Parker. As a result, successful writers such as Doc Pomus and Mort Shuman, Otis Blackwell and Winfield Scott, and Don Robertson lost interest in adhering to the needs of the grind. It was interlocking self-promotion, causing one MGM employee to remark that the movies "didn't need titles. They could be numbered. They would still sell".

Blackwell and Scott in fact submitted a candidate for the title track, "I'm a Roustabout", recorded on March 3, only to find it substituted by a song from a different team of writers. This recording was eventually released by RCA on the 2003 compilation 2nd to None.

Presley and his coterie of top session musicians gamely plowed through all of this, and eleven songs were recorded for the twenty-minute soundtrack LP. Four songs from this album appeared on the 1995 soundtrack compilation, The Essential 60s Masters II: "Roustabout", "Little Egypt", "Poison Ivy League", and "There's a Brand New Day on the Horizon".

== Track listing ==
Side one
No.	Title	Writer(s)	Recording date	Length
1.	"Roustabout"	Bernie Baum, Bill Giant, Florence Kaye	April 29, 1964	1:56
2.	"Little Egypt"	Jerry Leiber and Mike Stoller	March 2, 1964	2:15
3.	"Poison Ivy League"	Bernie Baum, Bill Giant, Florence Kaye	March 2, 1964	2:02
4.	"Hard Knocks"	Joy Byers	March 2, 1964	1:42
5.	"It's a Wonderful World"	Sid Tepper and Roy C. Bennett	March 2, 1964	1:48
6.	"Big Love Big Heartache"	Dolores Fuller, Lee Morris, Sonny Hendrix	March 3, 1964	1:57

Side two
No.	Title	Writer(s)	Recording date	Length
1.	"One Track Heart"	Bernie Baum, Bill Giant, Florence Kaye	March 3, 1964	2:15
2.	"It's Carnival Time"	Ben Weisman and Sid Wayne	March 3, 1964	1:32
3.	"Carny Town"	Fred Wise and Randy Starr	March 3, 1964	1:19
4.	"There's a Brand New Day on the Horizon"	Joy Byers	March 3, 1964	2:00
5.	"Wheels on My Heels"	Sid Tepper and Roy C. Bennett	March 3, 1964	1:19

== Personnel ==
Partial credits from Keith Flynn and Ernst Jørgensen 's examination of session tapes and RCA and AFM/musicians' union paperwork.

- Elvis Presley – lead vocals
- The Jordanaires (Gordon Stoker, Neal Matthews, Hoyt Hawkins, Ray Walker) – backing vocals (except "Roustabout")
- The Mello Men (Thurl Ravenscroft, Bill Lee, Bill Cole, Max Smith) – backing vocals (on "Roustabout")
- Scotty Moore – electric rhythm guitar (except "Roustabout")
- Billy Strange – electric lead guitar
- Tiny Timbrell – rhythm guitar
- Bob Moore – double bass (except "Roustabout")
- Ray Siegel – double bass (on "Roustabout")
- Floyd Cramer – piano (except "Roustabout")
- Dudley Brooks – piano (on "Roustabout")
- D. J. Fontana – drums (except "Roustabout")
- Buddy Harman – drums (except "Roustabout")
- Hal Blaine – drums (on "Roustabout")
- Bernie Mattinson – drums (on "Roustabout")
- Boots Randolph – saxophone (except "Roustabout")

== Charts ==
Chart (1965)	Peak position
Billboard Pop Albums	1
Australian Albums Chart	2

== Certifications ==
Region	Certification	Certified units/sales
United States (RIAA)	Gold	500,000^{^}
^{^} Shipments figures based on certification alone.
