= Amazing Grace: His Greatest Sacred Performances =

Compilation album by Elvis Presley
- Released: October 25, 1994
- Recorded: January 1957 – March 1974
- Genre: Gospel
- Length: 1:22:17
- Label: RCA Records
- Producer: Ernst Mikael Jorgensen; Roger Semon; Paul Williams

Elvis Presley chronology
From Nashville to Memphis: The Essential '60s Masters (1993)	Amazing Grace: His Greatest Sacred Performances (1994)	Command Performances: The Essential 60's Masters II (1995)

Professional ratings
Review scores
Source	Rating
AllMusic	4/5 stars
MusicHound	3.5/5 stars
The Rolling Stone Album Guide	5/5 stars
Rough Guides	5/5 stars

Amazing Grace: His Greatest Sacred Performances is a two-disc compilation of studio master recordings by Elvis Presley, released in 1994 on RCA Records and certified double platinum by the RIAA on July 15, 1999. The release also includes a booklet with session details and an essay by Charles Wolfe.

== Contents ==
The set, catalogued as number 66421-2, comprises recordings of gospel music made by Presley during his career. The contents of all three gospel albums Presley released in his lifetime are included, while other songs had appeared on singles, an extended play single, and other albums. The set also contains five previously unreleased selections, and the two discs present the studio masters in chronological session order.

Disc one contains the entirety of his two albums released respectively in 1960 and 1967, His Hand In Mine and How Great Thou Art. The other five tracks contain the four-song EP Peace in the Valley from 1957, incorporated later that year into his first Christmas album, and the 1965 hit single "Crying in the Chapel" which reached No. 3 on the Billboard Hot 100 and was added as the final track to the 1967 album.

Disc two contains the entirety of his 1972 album He Touched Me, with the five previously unreleased selections derived from a jam session captured on March 31, 1972, during the filming for Elvis on Tour. The songs "You'll Never Walk Alone" and "We Call On Him" were released as two sides of a single in time for Easter in 1968, and "Only Believe" and "Help Me" appeared as b-sides of singles in the 1970s but were excluded from the 1970s box set discs compiling his complete singles from that decade. The remaining five tracks appeared on Presley albums released during the 1970s, the songs "How Great Thou Art" and "Why Me Lord" being concert recordings.

This set accompanied RCA's mid-1990s compilation reissue program for Elvis Presley, including the five-disc box sets The King of Rock 'n' Roll: The Complete 50's Masters, From Nashville to Memphis: The Essential 60's Masters, Walk a Mile in My Shoes: The Essential 70's Masters, and the two-disc set anthologizing his 1960s soundtrack recordings, Command Performances: The Essential 60's Masters II. These nineteen compact discs, containing 507 recordings in total, constitute a substantial percentage of Presley's career output.

All selections recorded at Radio Recorders in Hollywood, RCA Studio B in Nashville, Tennessee, the Stax Recording Studio and the Mid-South Coliseum in Memphis, Tennessee. Unknown location for the March 1972 jam session. Original recordings produced by Steve Sholes or Felton Jarvis. Discographical information taken from Elvis Presley A Life in Music by Ernst Jorgensen.

== Track listing ==
Disc one
No.	Title	Writer(s)	Original album release	Length
1.	"I Believe"	Ervin Drake, Irvin Graham, Jimmy Shirl, Al Stillman	Elvis' Christmas Album	2:03
2.	"(There'll Be) Peace in the Valley (For Me)"	Thomas A. Dorsey	Elvis' Christmas Album	3:20
3.	"Take My Hand, Precious Lord"	Thomas A. Dorsey	Elvis' Christmas Album	3:19
4.	"It Is No Secret (What God Can Do)"	Stuart Hamblen	Elvis' Christmas Album	3:54
5.	"Milky White Way"	Lander Coleman	His Hand in Mine	2:12
6.	"His Hand In Mine"	Mosie Lister	His Hand in Mine	3:15
7.	"I Believe in the Man in the Sky"	Richard Howard	His Hand in Mine	2:11
8.	"He Knows Just What I Need"	Mosie Lister	His Hand in Mine	2:12
9.	"Mansion Over the Hilltop"	Ira Stanphill	His Hand in Mine	2:55
10.	"In My Father's House"	Aileene Hanks	His Hand in Mine	2:03
11.	"Joshua Fit the Battle"	traditional	His Hand in Mine	2:39
12.	"Swing Down Sweet Chariot"	traditional	His Hand in Mine	2:32
13.	"I'm Gonna Walk Dem Golden Stairs"	Culley Holt	His Hand in Mine	1:50
14.	"If We Never Meet Again"	Alfred E. Brumley	His Hand in Mine	1:58
15.	"Known Only to Him"	Stuart Hamblen	His Hand in Mine	2:07
16.	"Working on the Building"	Winifred O. Hoyle and Lillian Bowles	His Hand in Mine	1:52
17.	"Crying in the Chapel"	Artie Glenn	How Great Thou Art	2:24
18.	"Run On"	traditional	How Great Thou Art	2:21
19.	"How Great Thou Art"	Stuart K. Hine	How Great Thou Art	3:00
20.	"Stand by Me"	traditional	How Great Thou Art	2:26
21.	"Where No One Stands Alone"	Mosie Lister	How Great Thou Art	2:42
22.	"So High"	traditional	How Great Thou Art	1:56
23.	"Farther Along"	traditional	How Great Thou Art	4:04
24.	"By and By"	traditional	How Great Thou Art	1:49
25.	"In the Garden"	C. Austin Miles	How Great Thou Art	3:11
26.	"Somebody Bigger Than You and I"	Hy Heath, Sonny Burke, Johnny Lange	How Great Thou Art	2:25
27.	"Without Him"	Mylon LeFevre	How Great Thou Art	2:27
28.	"If The Lord Wasn't Walking By My Side"	Henry Slaughter	How Great Thou Art	1:36
29.	"Where Could I Go But to the Lord?"	James B. Coats	How Great Thou Art	3:36
Total length:				1:14:19

Disc two
No.	Title	Writer(s)	Original album release	Length
1.	"We Call on Him"	Fred Karger, Sid Wayne, Ben Weisman	You'll Never Walk Alone	2:31
2.	"You'll Never Walk Alone"	Oscar Hammerstein II and Richard Rodgers	You'll Never Walk Alone	2:43
3.	"Only Believe"	Paul Rader	Love Letters from Elvis	2:47
4.	"Amazing Grace"	John Newton	He Touched Me	3:34
5.	"Miracle of the Rosary"	Lee Denson	Elvis Now	1:50
6.	"Lead Me, Guide Me"	Doris Akers	He Touched Me	2:39
7.	"He Touched Me"	William J. Gaither	He Touched Me	2:39
8.	"I've Got Confidence"	Andraé Crouch	He Touched Me	2:20
9.	"An Evening Prayer"	C. Gabriel Battersby and Charles H. Gabriel	He Touched Me	1:54
10.	"Seeing Is Believing"	Red West, Glen Spreen	He Touched Me	2:53
11.	"A Thing Called Love"	Jerry Reed Hubbard	He Touched Me	2:23
12.	"Put Your Hand in the Hand"	Gene MacLellan	Elvis Now	3:15
13.	"Reach Out to Jesus"	Ralph Carmichael	He Touched Me	3:14
14.	"He Is My Everything"	Dallas Frazier	He Touched Me	2:39
15.	"There Is No God But God"	Bill Kenny	He Touched Me	2:17
16.	"I, John"	William Johnson, George McFadden, Phillip Brooks	He Touched Me	2:15
17.	"Bosom of Abraham"	William Johnson, George McFadden, Phillip Brooks	He Touched Me	1:35
18.	"Help Me"	Larry Gatlin	Promised Land	2:27
19.	"If That Isn't Love"	Dottie Rambo	Good Times	3:39
20.	"Why Me Lord"	Kris Kristofferson	On Stage In Memphis	2:52
21.	"How Great Thou Art"	Stuart K. Hine	On Stage In Memphis	3:34
22.	"I, John"	William Johnson, George McFadden, Phillip Brooks	previously unreleased	2:11
23.	"Bosom of Abraham"	William Johnson, George McFadden, Phillip Brooks	previously unreleased	0:53
24.	"You Better Run"	traditional	previously unreleased	2:09
25.	"Lead Me, Guide Me"	Doris Akers	previously unreleased	2:36
26.	"Turn Your Eyes Upon Jesus" / "Nearer, My God, to Thee" (medley)	Helen Howarth Lemmel / Sarah Fuller Flower Adams	previously unreleased	2:52
Total length:				1:06:41

== Personnel ==
- Elvis Presley – vocals, guitar, piano
- The Jordanaires – vocals
- The Imperials – vocals
- The Sweet Inspirations – vocals
- The Nashville Edition – vocals
- J.D. Sumner and the Stamps – vocals
- Tim Baty – vocals
- Charlie Hodge – vocals, guitar
- Millie Kirkham – vocals
- Sherrill Nielsen – vocals
- Donnie Sumner – vocals
- Kathy Westmoreland – vocals
- Dolores Edgin – backing vocals
- Mary Greene – backing vocals
- Ginger Holladay – backing vocals
- Mary Holladay – backing vocals
- Sonja Montgomery – backing vocals
- June Page – backing vocals
- Susan Pilkington – backing vocals
- Temple Riser – backing vocals
- Henry Slaughter – backing vocals, keyboards
- Boots Randolph – saxophone
- Pete Drake – pedal steel guitar
- Harold Bradley – electric guitar
- James Burton – electric guitar
- Johnny Christopher – electric guitar
- Hank Garland – electric guitar
- Scotty Moore – electric guitar
- Chip Young – electric guitar
- John Wilkinson – electric guitar
- David Briggs – keyboards
- Floyd Cramer – piano
- Glen D. Hardin – piano
- Joe Moscheo – piano
- Gordon Stoker – piano
- Hoyt Hawkins – organ
- Charlie McCoy – organ, bass
- Glen Spreen – organ
- Duke Bardwell – bass
- Bill Black – bass
- Bob Moore – bass
- Norbert Putnam – bass
- Kenny Buttrey – drums
- Jerry Carrigan – drums, percussion
- D.J. Fontana – drums
- Buddy Harman – drums
- Ronnie Tutt – drums
