= Harum Scarum (soundtrack) =

Soundtrack album by Elvis Presley
- Released: November 3, 1965
- Recorded: February 24–26, 1965
- Studio: RCA Studio B (Nashville)
- Genre: Pop; rock and roll
- Length: 24:14
- Label: RCA Victor
- Producer: Gene Nelson, Fred Karger

Elvis Presley chronology
Elvis for Everyone! (1965)	Harum Scarum (1965)	Frankie and Johnny (1966)

Professional ratings
Review scores
Source	Rating
AllMusic	1/5 stars
Billboard	(favorable)

Harum Scarum is the eleventh soundtrack album by American singer and musician Elvis Presley, released by RCA Victor in mono and stereo, LPM/LSP 3468, in November 1965. It is the soundtrack to the 1965 film of the same name starring Presley. It peaked at number eight on the Top LP's chart.

Although 1965 had seen the release of Elvis for Everyone!, a studio album which was actually recorded over a ten-year period dating back to Presley's first recordings from Sun Studios in Memphis, and a surprising worldwide hit with a five-year-old Gospel track, "Crying in the Chapel", it was back to the grind of making soundtracks. Elvis continued to grumble about the material and the continued pressure put on the stable of songwriters corralled by Freddy Bienstock – the writing team of Giant, Baum, and Kaye alone had provided 17 of 47 songs on the past four soundtracks in an eighteen-month period – but he soldiered on with as much grace as possible. In reality, almost any song could have been squeezed into the story lines, including old classics. But as long as sales continued, the formula required guaranteed control of publishing and new songs by the same songwriters. However, Presley's sales were plummeting in music stores as well as ticket sales at the box office.

Eleven songs were recorded for the companion film Harum Scarum, and all were used and issued on the soundtrack with two of the tracks omitted in the film. As with Roustabout, no singles were issued in conjunction with the album. A single was issued a month later, using the leftover 1957 track "Tell Me Why" backed with "Blue River" from aborted album sessions in May 1963. In an ominous sign of things to come, it only made it to number 33 on the Billboard Hot 100, the lowest charting single of Presley's career to date.

"Wisdom of the Ages" was recorded on February 24, 1965. It's featured as a bonus track along with "Animal Instinct", but are not featured in the film itself. The Jordanaires sang backing vocals. The song progresses from F major to B flat major, to D minor to E flat major to F major.

The film and its soundtrack are widely considered one of the lowest points of Presley's career. In 2003, Harum Scarum was reissued on Follow That Dream Records in a special edition that contained the original album tracks along with numerous alternate takes.

== Track listing ==
Side one
No.	Title	Writer(s)	Recording date	Length
1.	"Harem Holiday"	Peter Andreoli and Vince Poncia	February 26, 1965	2:18
2.	"My Desert Serenade"	Stanley J. Gelber	February 25, 1965	1:47
3.	"Go East – Young Man"	Bernie Baum, Bill Giant, Florence Kaye	February 26, 1965	2:16
4.	"Mirage"	Bernie Baum, Bill Giant, Florence Kaye	February 26, 1965	2:25
5.	"Kismet"	Sid Tepper and Roy C. Bennett	February 25, 1965	2:08
6.	"Shake That Tambourine"	Bernie Baum, Bill Giant, Florence Kaye	February 24, 1965	2:02

Side two
No.	Title	Writer(s)	Recording date	Length
1.	"Hey Little Girl"	Joy Byers	February 25, 1965	2:15
2.	"Golden Coins"	Bernie Baum, Bill Giant, Florence Kaye	February 26, 1965	1:54
3.	"So Close, Yet So Far (From Paradise)"	Joy Byers	February 25, 1965	3:01
4.	"Animal Instinct" (bonus track)	Bernie Baum, Bill Giant, Florence Kaye	February 26, 1965	2:13
5.	"Wisdom of the Ages" (bonus track)	Bernie Baum, Bill Giant, Florence Kaye	February 25, 1965	1:55

2003 bonus songs
No.	Title	Length
14.	"My Desert Serenade" (take 7 [2052])	2:15
15.	"Hey Little Girl" (takes1,2 [2068,69])	2:56
16.	"Shake That Tambourine" (takes 7–8 [2010–11])	2:38
17.	"Golden Coins takes" (3&4 [2075–76])	2:18
18.	"Kismet" (takes 1&2 [2063–64])	2:42
19.	"Animal Instinct" (takes 1,3,4 [2089,91–92])	5:17
20.	"So Close, Yet So Far (From Paradise)" (take 1 [2042])	3:26
21.	"Shake That Tambourine" (takes 10, 16 [2013,19])	3:04
22.	"Hey Little Girl" (take 3 [2070])	2:40
23.	"My Desert Serenade" (takes 2,3 [2047,48])	2:13
24.	"Golden Coins" (takes 7,8 [2079,80])	2:23
25.	"Harem Holiday" (takes 1,2 [2095,96])	3:18
26.	"Wisdom of the Ages" (take 3 [2060])	2:04
27.	"Shake That Tambourine" (takes 18–21 [2021–24])	3:11

== Personnel ==
- Elvis Presley – lead vocals
- The Jordanaires – backing vocals
- Scotty Moore – electric guitar
- Grady Martin – electric guitar
- Charlie McCoy – electric guitar
- Henry Strzelecki – electric bass
- Floyd Cramer – piano
- D. J. Fontana – drums
- Kenny Buttrey – drums
- Hoyt Hawkins – tambourine
- Gene Nelson – congas
- Rufus Long – flute
- Ralph Strobel – oboe

== Charts ==
Album

Year	Chart	Position
1965	Billboard Pop Albums	8
