= Roustabout (film) =

1964 musical feature film starring Elvis Presley directed by John Rich

- Theatrical release poster
- Directed by: John Rich
- Screenplay by: Anthony Lawrence; Allan Weiss
- Story by: Allan Weiss
- Produced by: Hal B. Wallis
- Starring: Elvis Presley; Barbara Stanwyck; Joan Freeman; Leif Erickson
- Cinematography: Lucien Ballard
- Edited by: Warren Low
- Music by: Joseph J. Lilley
- Production company: Hal Wallis Productions
- Distributed by: Paramount Pictures
- Release date: November 10, 1964 (USA)
- Running time: 101 minutes
- Country: United States
- Language: English
- Box office: $3,300,000 (US/ Canada rentals)

Roustabout is a 1964 American musical feature film starring Elvis Presley as a singer who takes a job working with a struggling carnival. The film was produced by Hal Wallis and directed by John Rich from a screenplay by Anthony Lawrence and Allan Weiss. The screenplay was nominated for a Writers Guild of America award for best written American musical. The New York Times noted that Elvis was "perfectly cast" although Roustabout received a lukewarm review in Variety. The film's soundtrack album was one of Elvis Presley's most successful, reaching no. 1 on the Billboard Album Chart. Quentin Tarantino called Roustabout one of Presley's most entertaining films and said that it had the best soundtrack of all of Presley's color films. It was filmed in Techniscope at Paramount Studios, with carnival and road rage sequences shot in Thousand Oaks, California. Filming began in March 1964.

== Plot ==
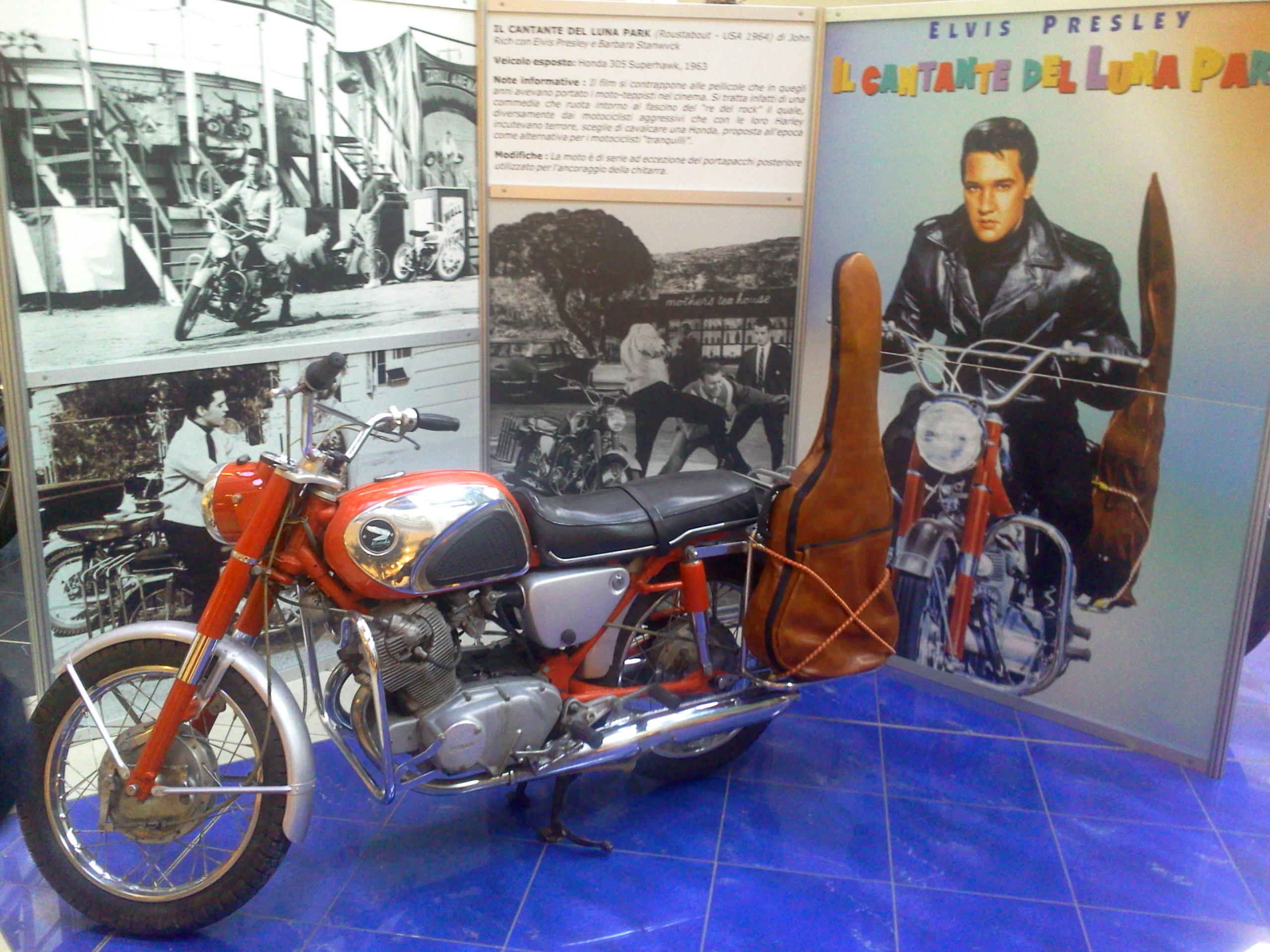
The Honda 305 Superhawk motorcycle used in the film

Singer Charlie Rogers is enjoying his life and delivering successful performances at a busy restaurant in California. But when a group of female students in the audience become very happy cheering the singer, their male companions turn jealous and angry. After the show, several angry students set up an attack on Charlie in the parking lot. After brawling, Charlie is fired from his job and arrested by police.

After a night in jail, Charlie hits the road on his Honda 305 Superhawk motorcycle. He spots Cathy Lean in a car driven by her father, Joe, with their employer, Maggie Morgan. When Charlie tries to become friendly with Cathy, Joe drives Charlie's bike off the road; Charlie falls and the bike is wrecked after crashing into a wooden fence.

Maggie offers him a place to stay and a job with her struggling traveling carnival while the bike is being repaired. Charlie becomes a "carnie", a roustabout. Maggie recognizes his musical talents and promotes him to feature attraction. His performances soon draw large crowds to the carnival. Charlie romances Cathy, which brings him repeatedly into conflict with Joe. A patron loses his wallet and accuses Joe of stealing. Charlie later finds the wallet, but now he is accused of holding back a customer's lost wallet that Joe was accused of stealing. Charlie is lured away by Harry Carver to star in his much more successful show.

Once again, he is a great success. However, when Charlie learns that Maggie is facing bankruptcy, he returns. Charlie brings back the crowds and saves her carnival from folding. Joe takes another swing at Charlie, and Charlie defends himself. Maggie witnesses the fight and asks Charlie to reveal the real reason he came back. Charlie admits he returned both to save the carnival and because he loves Cathy. In the musical finale, he and Cathy are happily reunited.

== Cast ==
- Elvis Presley as Charlie Rogers
- Barbara Stanwyck as Maggie Morgan
- Joan Freeman as Cathy Lean
- Leif Erickson as Joe Lean
- Jack Albertson as Lou, a teahouse manager
- Sue Ane Langdon as Madame Mijanou, a fortune teller
- Pat Buttram as Harry Carver
- Joan Staley as Marge
- Dabbs Greer as Arthur Nielsen
- Steve Brodie as Fred the Pitcher
- Norman Grabowski as Sam
- Lynn Borden as a college student
- Jane Dulo as Hazel
- Joel Fluellen as Cody Marsh, another roustabout
- Wilda Taylor as Little Egypt, the principal dancer in the number "Little Egypt"

Uncredited actors listed alphabetically:

- Beverly Adams as Cora, a dancer
- Billy Barty as Billy, carnival worker with dwarfism
- Teri Garr as College Girl. Garr can also be seen as a backup dancer during several musical numbers.
- Joy Harmon as College Girl
- Richard Kiel as Strongman. Kiel is better known for playing "Jaws" in the James Bond movies The Spy Who Loved Me (1977) and Moonraker (1979)
- Kent McCord as Carnival Worker
- Raquel Welch as College Girl
- Red West as Carnival Worker

== Musical numbers ==
See also Roustabout (soundtrack)

- "Roustabout" by Bill Giant, Bernie Baum and Florence Kaye
- "Poison Ivy League" by Bill Giant, Bernie Baum and Florence Kaye
- "One Track Heart" by Bill Giant, Bernie Baum and Florence Kaye
- "Wheels on My Heels" by Sid Tepper and Roy C. Bennett
- "It's a Wonderful World" by Sid Tepper and Roy C. Bennett
- "It's Carnival Time" by Ben Weisman and Sid Wayne
- "Carny Town" by Fred Wise and Randy Starr
- "Hard Knocks" by Joy Byers
- "There's a Brand New Day On the Horizon" by Joy Byers
- "Big Love, Big Heartache" by Dolores Fuller, Lee Morris and Sonny Hendrix
- "Little Egypt" by Jerry Leiber and Mike Stoller
- "I'm a Roustabout" by Otis Blackwell and Winfield Scott, a different and unreleased theme song for the movie

All tunes in the film were sung by Presley.

== Reception ==
Roustabout reached #8 nationally at the box office in 1964 based on the Variety survey. The film finished as #28 on the year-end list of the top-grossing movies of 1964 and earned $3 million at the box office.

The New York Times writer Howard Thompson complained about "little in the way of dramatic substance" and that the movie wasn't "nearly so trim a package" as Fun in Acapulco or Viva Las Vegas, but noted that Elvis was "perfectly cast" and "surprisingly convincing in his role." Variety was lukewarm, faulting mainly a script "loaded with clichés", but noted the film would likely be a box-office hit based upon its star names, songs, and "Technicolor, Techniscope frame." John L. Scott of the Los Angeles Times called the film "a trite, cliche-ridden story that has been thrown together to showcase Elvis Presley and his vocalizing. It serves its purpose well, and probably will prove a box office bonanza for producer Hal Wallis." The Monthly Film Bulletin wrote, "Presley vehicles have sadly deteriorated since the days of Follow That Dream, and this amiable but uninspiring piece does nothing to halt the process, despite curiosity value provided by Barbara Stanwyck, back with Paramount for the first time in ten years."

Quentin Tarantino in one his reviews, noted Roustabout as "Elvis’ superior vehicle" and stated that "Roustabout is one of Elvis’ most entertaining pictures of that era of Elvis Presley movies. He enters the film on a motorcycle, dressed head to toe in black motorcycle leathers (like Brando in The Wild One)." Quentin Tarantino pointed that for Elvis "It’s the only film where he gets to demonstrate his Ed Parker taught karate. It includes a small bit part early on with Raquel Welch. And contains the best soundtrack of songs of all of his color movies, including a rarity for Elvis on film, a cover of somebody else’s rock and roll hit, The Coaster’s Little Egypt."

Roustabout holds a 56% rating on Rotten Tomatoes based on nine reviews.

Roustabout was released on VHS in the 1980s and later on DVD in various packages during the 1990s and 2000s, it is also included in the "ELVIS 5 MOVIES" collection released by Paramount Pictures in 2020.

== Awards and honors ==
The film's screenwriters, Anthony Lawrence and Allan Weiss, were nominated for the Writers Guild of America Award for Best Written American Musical. The film generated a best-selling soundtrack album that went #1 on the Billboard charts. The soundtrack album would be Presley's final #1 soundtrack and last #1 album until 1969's From Elvis in Memphis, which topped the charts in the U.K.
