= Johnny Sablan =

Chamorro musician

Johnny Sablan (born 1948) is a Chamorro musician from Guam, known for recording the first commercial Chamorro album which established a musical identity for the island. Sablan briefly recorded music and toured in California as a teenager before returning to Guam to release the "Dalai Nene," which marked the beginning of his Chamorro language music career.

== Early life ==
Johnny Sablan's musical career began in March 1957, when his uncle, Ton Sablan, better known as "Lightning", recruited him to entertain patients at the old Guam Memorial Hospital. At a young age, Sablan was appreciated as a performer in his community.

By 1958, Sablan had already gained experience in the music industry, performing American pop songs and building a reputation as a recording artist in southern California during the early 1960s.

== Career ==
=== 1960: Moving to California and signing to Columbia Artists ===
In 1960, when Sablan was 13 years old, his father took him and his two brothers, Joseph and James, to Los Angeles, California. There, Sablan enrolled in a talent contest on a late-night television show where he won second place. After the talent show, he was scouted by Columbia Artist producers who offered to sign him under Ben Weisman's Skylark Records.

=== 1961 - 1962: Touring and recording Sablan's first singles ===
After signing with Skylark, Sablan toured with other acts, including Kathy Wells and The Penguins, and recorded three 45 rpm records:

1. "Big Fat Lie" B side: "Will She Agree to Go Steady with Me"
2. "Imitation Heart" B side: "I Know."
3. "I Don't Want to Miss You." B side: "Agat Town"

Among these songs, "Imitation Heart" was Sablan's biggest hit and hit the Billboard Top 100.

"Agat Town" was about Sablan's home village in Guam.

=== 1965-1968: Returning to Guam, completing high school, returning to California for college ===
In 1965, Sablan returned to Guam to complete high school in Father Duenas Memorial, and participated in a local talent show held at the Agana Cathedral Bazaar.

After graduating High School, Sablan returned to California to study medicine and became part of his college's International Club where he took part in organizing the dance and song presentation for many cultures. However, when one of his peers asked Sablan if he could organize entertainments native to Guam, Sablan realized he was not in touch with his Guamanian identity.

=== 1968: Reconnecting with his Chamorro roots and recording Dalai Nene ===
In 1968, Sablan set out to learn how to speak, read, and write in Chamorro with the help of his uncle, Greg Guevara. After garnering enough confidence, he recorded his album Dalai Nene (Goodness Sweetheart) in a studio in Hollywood, California. The album was a mix of Chamorro songs from his island home, including pre-World War II pieces and original compositions in popular styles of the time. It is the first studio album recorded in the Chamorro language.

Before Sablan's album, Chamorro youth in Guam listened to American music, such as Elvis Presley and rock and roll while the adults mostly listened to American country music. Sablan's work came during a period of rising cultural nationalism, influenced by the American civil rights movement and global decolonization efforts.

=== 1969 - 1971: Chamorro Yu', visits to Vietnam, and Hafa Adai Todo Maoleg ===
In September 1969, Sablan released his album Chamorro Yu' (I am Chamorro), another Chamorro language album that features culturally significant songs including "An Gumupu si Paluma" (The Bird Flies), "Si Nåna Gi Familia" (The Mother of the Family), "Si Sirena" (The Mermaid), and "Munga Yu' Ma Fino Inglesi" (Do Not Speak to Me in English).

In late 1969, Eddie Duenas, the governor's press secretary, invited Sablan to Vietnam to perform for the Chamorro soldiers stationed for the Vietnam war. After his first visit, Sablan returned two more times.

During his 1971 Christmas to Vietnam, Sablan performed new songs from his then upcoming album Hafa Adai Todo Maoleg (Hello, All is Well).

In March 1971, Sablan released the album Hafa Adai Todo Maoleg. It features the title tracks which became a hit song in other Mariana islands including Saipan and has become a frequent dance song in Chamorro events. The album includes 10 English songs and Chamorro songs.

=== 1995: Kantan Christmas Collection (Kantan Nobena Yan Minagof) ===
In 1995, Sablan released his Christmas album, Kantan Christmas Collection (Kantan Nobena Yan Minagof) (Songs of Christmas [Songs of Novena and Happiness]).

== Career after music ==
In 1985, 1996, 2004, and 2016, Sablan contributed in representing Guam in the Festival of Pacific Arts and Culture as either performer, musical director, performing arts director, task force member, or head of delegation.

Throughout the 1990s, Sablan was the executive director for the Guam Council on the Arts and Humanities Agency.

In 2011, at the Island Music Awards, Sablan performed "Hafa Adai" and received the Island Icon Award.

In 2016, Sablan was appointed as the President of the Department of Chamorro Affairs where he oversees the Guam Council on Arts and Humanities, the Guam Museum, the Public Library, and the Hagatna Restoration and Redevelopment Authority.

== Discography ==
=== Singles ===
- Big Fat Lie B side: Will She Agree to Go Steady with Me (1965)
- Imitation Heart B side: I Know. (1965)
- I Don't Want to Miss You. B side: Agat Town (1965)
- Feliz Navidad (1975)

=== Albums ===
- Dalai Nene (1969)
- My Marianas (1969)
- Chamorro Yu' (1969)
- Hafa Adai Todu Maoleg (1969)
- My Chamorrans (1970)
- Kantan Christmas Collection (Kantan Nobena Yan Minagof) (1995)
