= In the Beginning (1954 song) =

""In the Beginning""

Song by Dorcas Cochran, Kay Twomey, Ben Weisman, Fred Wise
- Released: 1954
- Label: Philips Records, Columbia

"In the Beginning" is a popular song, by Dorcas Cochran, Kay Twomey, Ben Weisman, and Fred Wise. The lyrics commence: "In the Beginning the Lord made the earth...".

It was recorded by Frankie Laine in December, 1954 and released by Columbia as catalog number 40378, the flip side being "Old Shoes." Although the song did not chart in the United States, it reached #20 on the United Kingdom charts on March 5, 1955. The UK release was by Philips Records as catalog number PB 311 B (flip side of "Rain, Rain, Rain").
