= One Track Heart =

One Track Heart may refer to:

- One Track Heart, a 1996 album by Krishna Das
- One Track Heart: The Story of Krishna Das, a 2012 documentary film about the vocalist Kishna Das
- "One Track Heart", a song from the 1964 soundtrack album Roustabout by Elvis Presley
