= By and By =

""By and By" also known as "We'll Understand It Better By and By""

Hymn by Golden Gate Quartet, Elvis Presley and many others
- Written: ca 1906
- Songwriter: Charles Albert Tindley
- Composer: Charles Albert Tindley

By and By, also known as We'll Understand It Better By and By, is a song by Charles Albert Tindley. Composed in 1905, it is a 3-versed hymn that pairs with the tune of the same name. It is also often referred to by its first line, “We are often tossed and driven on the restless sea of time”, or the first line of the refrain, “By and by, when the morning comes.”⁴ Like many of his songs, Tindley composed “We’ll Understand it Better By and By” in his head, and transcribed and recorded it after, as Tindley was self-taught. A french version of the same song entitled "Le Seigneur Nous A Aimés" is credited to Maurice Debaisieux.

== History ==
Tindley and his wife, Daisy Henry, attended Bainbridge St. Methodist Episcopal church together in Philadelphia, Pennsylvania after the Civil War. Daisy was also a musician; like Tindley, she was a singer and pianist. The pair had eight children together. Tindley began his involvement with his church as a janitor, seeking religious tutelage from members of the church. He then began work at the church as an unpaid sexton. Eventually, he became the pastor at the church, where he spoke of current events to his congregation. He criticized the racism of the popular minstrel shows displayed throughout the country. Through his leadership, the church grew in members and wealth. The church eventually had to relocate to a bigger sanctuary in 1924 due to rapid growth. Tindley’s wife Daisy passed away on the day the congregation moved to the larger sanctuary. He was reportedly heartbroken at her death, and later admitted about her death that “one day I will understand it better by and by”.³ Several of the children Tindley had with Daisy would help him publish his hymns and compositions.

== Lyrics ==
"We are often tossed and driv’n on the restless sea of time, somber skies and howling tempest oft succeed a bright sunshine; in that land of perfect day, when the mists have rolled away, we will understand it better by and by.

Refrain: By and by, when the morning comes, when the saints of God are gathered home, we’ll tell the story, how we’ve overcome, for we’ll understand it better by and by.

We are often destitute of the things that life demands, want of food and want of shelter, thirsty hills and barren lands; we are trusting in the Lord, and according to the Word, we will understand it better by and by. [Refrain]

Temptations, hidden snares, often take us unawares, and our hearts are made to bleed for any thoughtless word or deed; and we wonder why the test when we try to do our best, but we’ll understand it better by and by." [Refrain]

== Alternate Lyrics ==
"Trials dark on every hand, and we cannot understand all the ways of God would lead us to that blessed promised land; but he guides us with his eye, and we'll follow till we die, for we'll understand it better by and by. [Refrain]

Oft our cherished plans have failed, disappointments have prevailed, And we’ve wandered in the darkness, heavy-hearted and alone But we’re trusting in the Lord, and according to His word, We will understand it better by and by. [Refrain]

Temptations, hidden snares, often take us unawares, and our hearts are made to bleed, for a thoughtless word or deed; and we wonder why the test, when we try to do our best, but we'll understand it better by and by." [Refrain]

== Notable Performances ==
Noteworthy recordings and performances of the song have achieved high fame in American popular culture. Elvis Presley included a rendition in his 1967 album How Great Thou Art, and the Golden Gate Quartet recorded a version of the song in their album When the Saints Go Marching In. Jazz piano player Thelonious Monk recorded a version of this tune on his album Les Liaisons Dangereuses.

A version recorded by Lead Belly in the 1940s has been released by Smithsonian Folkways on albums for children, including Lead Belly Sings for Children (1999).

== See also ==
- List of songs recorded by Elvis Presley
