= (You're the) Devil in Disguise =

1963 single by Elvis Presley

Single by Elvis Presley
- B-side: "Please Don't Drag That String Around"
- Released: June 18, 1963
- Recorded: May 26, 1963
- Studio: RCA Studio B, Nashville
- Genre: Rock and roll, pop
- Length: 2:17
- Label: RCA Victor
- Songwriters: Bill Giant, Bernie Baum, Florence Kaye

Elvis Presley singles chronology
"One Broken Heart for Sale" / "They Remind Me Too Much of You" (1963)	"(You're the) Devil in Disguise" (1963)	"Bossa Nova Baby" / "Witchcraft" (1963)

Official music video
- (You're The) Devil In Disguise on YouTube

"(You're the) Devil in Disguise" is a 1963 single by Elvis Presley. It was written by Bill Giant, Bernie Baum, and Florence Kaye and was published by Elvis Presley Music in June 1963. The song peaked at number three on the U.S. Billboard Hot 100 on August 10, 1963, and number 9 on the Billboard Rhythm and Blues chart, becoming his final top-10 single on the rhythm and blues chart. The single was certified gold by the RIAA for sales in excess of 500,000 units in the US.

In June 1963, when the song was debuted to a British audience on the BBC television show Juke Box Jury, celebrity guest John Lennon voted the song "a miss", opining that Presley had become "like Bing Crosby". The song subsequently peaked at number one on the UK singles chart for one week.

Bill Porter engineered the recording session on May 26, 1963, at RCA Studios in Nashville. "(You're the) Devil in Disguise" and its B-side "Please Don't Drag That String Around" were recorded for a full-length album that was scheduled for release in 1963, but RCA Records chose instead to release the material on nonalbum singles and soundtrack albums. The recording later appeared on the 1968 compilation album Elvis' Gold Records Volume 4.

== Personnel ==
Credits from Keith Flynn and Ernst Jorgensen's examination of session tapes and RCA and AFM paperwork.

- Elvis Presley – lead vocals
- The Jordanaires (Gordon Stoker, Neal Matthews, Ray Walker) – backing vocals
- Millie Kirkham, Joe Babcock – backing vocals
- Scotty Moore – rhythm guitar
- Grady Martin – lead guitar
- Floyd Cramer – piano
- Bob Moore – double bass
- Harold Bradley – six-string electric bass guitar
- D. J. Fontana – drums
- Buddy Harman – drums
- Boots Randolph – shakers

== Charts and certifications ==
=== Weekly charts ===
Chart (1963)	Peak position
Australia (ARIA)	2
Belgium (Ultratop 50 Flanders)	1
Belgium (Ultratop 50 Wallonia)	9
Canada (CHUM Hit Parade)	1
Finland (Finnish Singles Chart)	1
French Singles (SNICP)	1
Ireland (IRMA)	1
Netherlands (Single Top 100)	1
New Zealand Singles (NZFPI)	3
Norway (VG-lista)	1
Sweden (Kvällstoppen)	1
Sweden (Tio i Topp)	1
UK Record Retailer	1
US Billboard Hot 100	3
Billboard Hot R&B Singles	9
West Germany (GfK)	2

Chart (2005)	Peak position
European Hot 100 Singles (Billboard)	11
Netherlands (Single Top 100)	23
Sweden (Sverigetopplistan)	58

=== Year-end charts ===
Chart (1963)	Rank
UK	30
US Hot 100 (Billboard)	58
US Singles (Cash Box)	76

=== Decade-end charts ===
Chart (1960–69)	Rank
German Singles (Boxen-Schlager)	107

=== Certifications ===
Region	Certification	Certified units/sales
New Zealand (RMNZ)	Gold	15,000^{‡}
United Kingdom (BPI)	Gold	400,000^{‡}
United States (RIAA)	Gold	500,000^{^}
^{^} Shipments figures based on certification alone.^{‡} Sales+streaming figures based on certification alone.

== Other versions ==
A cover version by Trisha Yearwood appears on the Honeymoon in Vegas soundtrack, which consists mainly of covers of Presley songs. Punk rock band the Misfits covered the song on the extended edition of their 2003 album Project 1950, which also contained a cover of Presley's "(Marie's the Name) His Latest Flame". Karel Gott recorded the song in 2012. The Residents, Tom Green, Ronnie McDowell, Showaddywaddy, and Peter Kraus have also recorded the song. Scotty Moore and D.J. Fontana have performed the song live in concert.

In 1977, Finnish band Kontra, in Finnish (as "Nainen valepuvussa") placed it on their debut album Ei kontrollia.

Johnny Hallyday, in French in 1964

Richard Hawley, on his Live at the Devil's A**e live album released in 2009

In 2015, Swedish Fröken Elvis recorded it with the title "Psykopat".

Larkin Poe, for its 2020 album Kindred Spirits, with a somber and slower tone.

Post Malone performed the song in 2023 at the Graceland Mansion pool for the NBC special Christmas at Graceland.
