= Sid Wayne =

Background information
- Birth name: Sidney Weinberg
- Born: January 26, 1923; Brooklyn, New York, United States
- Died: December 26, 1991 (aged 68)
- Occupation(s): Songwriter, lyricist, composer

Sid Wayne (January 26, 1923 – December 26, 1991) was an American songwriter, lyricist and composer, who wrote a number of well-known songs from the 1950s to the 1980s. Almost every Elvis Presley film contained one or more works written by Wayne and his partner Ben Weisman.

== Career ==
His most known works are "See You in September" (co-written with Sherman Edwards), "It's Impossible" — featuring the English lyric of Armando Manzanero's "Somos Novios" — "Mangos" (with Dee Libbey), "Two Different Worlds" and "Relax Max" (with Al Frisch) and "I Need Your Love Tonight" (with Bix Reichner).

Wayne, Weisman and Fred Karger wrote five songs for the soundtrack to the 1966 movie Hold On! featuring Herman's Hermits and Shelley Fabares.

From 1960 to 1962, Wayne was the musical director of the CBS game show Video Village, which debuted shortly after the scandal-tainted rigged quizzes of the 1950s left the air.

== Personal life ==
Born Sidney Weinberg in Brooklyn, New York on January 26, 1923, Wayne, a self-taught musician had many successes in New York. In 1961, when TV game show Video Village moved from New York to Los Angeles, he moved his young family to West Hollywood, California, to start the west coast phase of his career. There he teamed up with Weisman for work on the Elvis Presley films. As Presley's film career tapered off, Wayne returned to his New York roots to have his biggest Grammy nominated hit with the Perry Como recording of "It's Impossible". This song, a love ballad for his wife Rhea, was commissioned as the English lyric to Manzanero's "Somos Novios". The English version, "It's Impossible", was originally performed by Perry Como and nominated for a Grammy Award in 1972.

In 1980, Wayne relocated to Dallas, Texas, where he continued to write for commercial television and advertising with another songwriting partner, Stephen Arnold and Roger Howell (singer/songwriter).

== Filmography ==
- G.I. Blues (1960)
  - Song: "Tonight Is So Right For Love" - (Written by: Sid Wayne & Abner Silver)
  - Song: "What's She Really Like" - (Written by: Sid Wayne & Abner Silver)
  - Song: "Frankfort Special" - (Written by: Sid Wayne & Sherman Edwards)
  - Song: "Big Boots" - (Written by: Sid Wayne & Sherman Edwards)
  - Song: "Didja' Ever" - (Written by: Sid Wayne & Sherman Edwards)
- Flaming Star (1960)
  - Song: "Flaming Star" - (Written by: Sid Wayne & Sherman Edwards)
- Follow That Dream (1962)
  - Song: "What A Wonderful Life" - (Written by: Sid Wayne & Jerry Livingston)
- It Happened at the World's Fair (1963)
  - Song: "Happy Ending" - (Written by: Sid Wayne & Ben Weisman)
- Fun in Acapulco (1963)
  - Song: "Fun in Acapulco" - (Written by: Sid Wayne & Ben Weisman)
  - Song: "Slowly But Surely" - (Written by: Sid Wayne & Ben Weisman)
- Roustabout (1964)
  - Song: "It's Carnival Time" - (Written by: Sid Wayne & Ben Weisman)
- Girl Happy (1965)
  - Song: "Cross My Heart and Hope To Die" - (Sid Wayne & Ben Weisman)
  - Song: "Do The Clam" - (Written by: Sid Wayne, Ben Weisman, Dolores Fuller)
- Tickle Me (1965)
  - Song: "Slowly But Surely" - (Written by: Sid Wayne & Ben Weisman)
- Frankie and Johnny (1966)
  - Song: "Frankie and Johnny" - (Written by: Jimmie Rodgers, Sid Wayne, Ben Weisman, Fred Karger)
  - Song: "Chesay" - (Written by: Sid Wayne, Ben Weisman, Fred Karger)
  - Song: "Hard Luck" - (Written by: Sid Wayne & Ben Weisman)
- From Hell to Borneo (1966)
  - Song: "Sugar Cane Man" - (Written by: Sid Wayne and Sharon Silbert)
  - Song: "Web Foot Waddle" - (Written by: Sid Wayne and Sharon Silbert)
  - Song: "Lonelier Than I" - (Written by: Sid Wayne and Sharon Silbert)
- Paradise, Hawaiian Style (1966)
  - Song: "A Dog's Life" - (Written by: Sid Wayne & Ben Weisman)
- Spinout (1966)
  - Song: "Spinout" - (Written by: Sid Wayne, Ben Weisman, Dolores Fuller)
  - Song: "I'll Be Back" - (Written by: Sid Wayne & Ben Weisman)
- Easy Come, Easy Go (1967)
  - Song: "Easy Come Easy Go" - (Written by: Sid Wayne & Ben Weisman)
- Double Trouble (1967)
  - Song: "It Won't Be Long" - (Written by: Sid Wayne & Ben Weisman)
- Clambake (1967)
  - Song: "Clambake" - (Written by: Sid Wayne & Ben Weisman)
  - Song: "How Can You Lose What You Never Had" - (Written by: Sid Wayne & Ben Weisman)
- Stay Away, Joe (1968)
  - Song: "Stay Away, Joe" - (Written by: Sid Wayne & Ben Weisman)
- Speedway (1968)
  - Song: "Who Are You (Who Am I)" - (Written by: Sid Wayne & Ben Weisman)
  - Song: "He's Your Uncle Not Your Dad" - (Written by: Sid Wayne & Ben Weisman)
