= Florence Kaye =

American songwriter (1919–2006)

Florence Kaye (January 19, 1919 — May 12, 2006) was an American songwriter who worked with Bill Giant and Bernie Baum. She was born in New York City. She performed a radio show in Georgia and entertained troops for United Service Organizations. The three built a significant list of credits, including many songs recorded by Elvis Presley. The majority of their tunes were used in Presley's musicals. Their work was also credited in the American version of Osamu Tezuka's anime Kimba the White Lion (1965). The only hit song by the trio was Presley's "(You're the) Devil in Disguise", in 1963.

== List of songs ==
The following films included songs composed by Kaye et al.

- Double Trouble
- Easy Come, Easy Go
- Follow That Dream
- Frankie and Johnny
- Fun in Acapulco
- Girl Happy
- Girls! Girls! Girls!
- Harum Scarum
- Kissin' Cousins
- Live a Little, Love a Little
- Paradise, Hawaiian Style
- Poison Ivy League
- Roustabout
- Spinout
- Viva Las Vegas (The title track was written by Doc Pomus and Mort Shuman.)
