= Bernie Baum =

American songwriter

Bernie Baum (October 13, 1929 – August 28, 1993) was a songwriter who worked extensively with Elvis Presley. He grew up in New York City and later worked with Harvey Zimmerman (better known as Bill Giant) and Florence Kaye. The majority of their songs were used in Presley's musicals. He and his two collaborators also wrote a theme music package for the NBC Weekend radio service called "Monitor" in 1965. Their work was also credited in the American version of Osamu Tezuka's anime Kimba the White Lion (1965). He had a #1 Hit with his song "Music! Music! Music!", Teresa Brewer's B side recording which unexpectedly took off, selling over a million copies and becoming Teresa's signature song with his other works included:

- Roustabout
- (You're the) Devil in Disguise
- Viva Las Vegas (The title track was written by Doc Pomus and Mort Shuman.)
- Fun in Acapulco
- Girls! Girls! Girls!
- It Happened at the World's Fair
- Kissin' Cousins
- Girl Happy
- Harum Scarum
- Frankie and Johnny
- Paradise, Hawaiian Style
- Spinout
- Easy Come, Easy Go
- Double Trouble
- Live a Little, Love a Little
- "Music! Music! Music!"
