= Fred Wise (songwriter) =

American lyricist (1915–1966)

- Born: May 27, 1915; New York City, New York, U.S.
- Died: January 18, 1966 (aged 50) New York City, New York, U.S.
- Occupation: Lyricist

Fred Wise (May 27, 1915 – January 18, 1966) was the co-writer of the lyrics to the 1948 song "'A' — You're Adorable" with Buddy Kaye and Sid Lippman. He subsequently wrote many of the songs sung by Elvis Presley in his movies. Wise attended Columbia University and graduated in 1935. He was of Jewish descent.

Many of his songs were collaborations with Kay Twomey and Ben Weisman, sometimes with additional collaborators. (see "Wooden Heart" and "In the Beginning.")

== Selected songs ==
- "Follow That Dream"
- "I Got Lucky"
