= Bill Giant =

American songwriter

- Born: March 2, 1930; New York, New York, U.S.
- Died: November 26, 1987 (aged 57)
- Other names: Bill "Harvey" Zimmerman, Billy Merman
- Occupations: Songwriter, real estate agent

Bill Giant (March 2, 1930 – November 26, 1987) was an American songwriter whose work included over 40 songs for Elvis Presley.

== Biography ==
Giant grew up in New York City and was known as Bill "Harvey" Zimmerman. His other memorable name was Billy Merman. He was part of the popular songwriting team Giant, Baum, and Kaye, writing songs with Bernie Baum and Florence Kaye. The majority of their work was used in Presley movies, although their most popular recording was "(You're the) Devil in Disguise" which reached number three on the U.S. Billboard Hot 100 and number one on the U.K. singles chart in 1963. They were also credited with writing the American version of Osamu Tezuka's anime Kimba the White Lion (1965). Giant became a realtor in Middlesex County, New Jersey, in his later years. He died in 1987 at the age of 57.

== Other works ==
His other works include songs in these films:

- Roustabout
- Viva Las Vegas (The title track was written by Doc Pomus and Mort Shuman.)
- Fun in Acapulco
- Girls! Girls! Girls!
- It Happened at the World's Fair
- Kissin' Cousins
- Girl Happy
- Harum Scarum
- Frankie and Johnny
- Paradise, Hawaiian Style
- Spinout
- Easy Come, Easy Go
- Double Trouble
- Live a Little, Love a Little
