= Ben Weisman =

American composer (1921–2007)

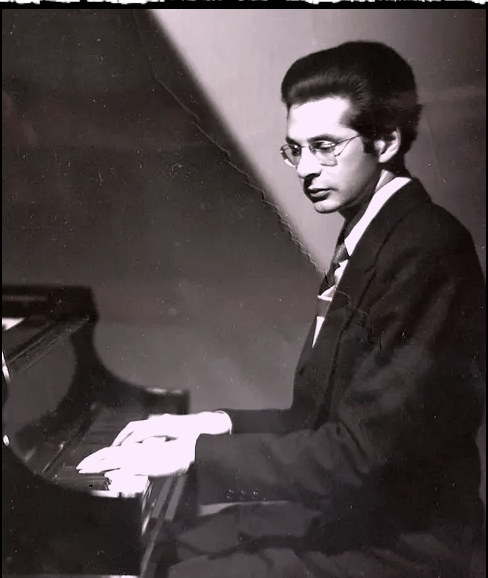
- Weisman in 1945

Background information
- Born: Benjamin Weisman; November 16, 1921; Providence, Rhode Island, U.S.
- Died: May 20, 2007 (aged 85) Los Angeles, California, United States
- Occupation: Composer

Benjamin Weisman (November 16, 1921 – May 20, 2007) was an American composer. He wrote 57 songs recorded by Elvis Presley, more than any other songwriter.

== Biography ==
Weisman was born in Providence, Rhode Island, and grew up in Brooklyn, New York. He studied classical piano as a child, and then at the Juilliard School of Music. After being drafted, he became Special Services Music Director for the U.S. Army Air Force, before returning to New York and a career in Tin Pan Alley. Initially, he found success writing with Fred Wise and Kay Twomey, often using the collective pseudonym "Al Hill". Their early successes included "Let Me Go, Lover!", written with Jenny Lou Carson and recorded by Joan Weber, Patti Page, Kathy Kirby, and many others.

He signed an exclusive contract with the music publishers Hill & Range, and began writing for Presley at the request of company co-owner Jean Aberbach. Weisman wrote for Presley from 1956 ("First in Line") to 1971 ("Change of Habit"). Their early association (1957–1962) produced many of the most powerful rockers and poignant ballads in Presley's repertoire, including "Got a Lot o' Livin' to Do", "Follow That Dream", "Rock-A-Hula Baby", "Crawfish", "As Long as I Have You", "Pocketful of Rainbows" and "Fame and Fortune". Weisman later said:

"I approached writing for Elvis differently than I did for any other artist. The songs had to have a combination of blues, country, rock and pop - what came to be called 'rockabilly'. It was like walking in his musical shoes. With each new Elvis movie, more of my songs were being recorded. It became more and more exciting, for I was becoming the only songwriter to have so many songs recorded by him. After completing each song, I would make a demonstration record, using a singer that could copy Elvis' sound. I used the same type of rhythm section that he used, with the same type of vocal backgrounds. The end result was a tailor-made production, just for him.... My friendship with Elvis developed during the studio sessions in Hollywood, to which I was always invited to attend. Since they copied my demos note-for-note, Elvis liked to have me around in case there were any problems. He had a great sense of humor, and used to call me the 'Mad Professor.'"

Weisman also co-wrote hit songs for other artists, including "The Night Has a Thousand Eyes", written with Dorothy Wayne and Marilyn Garrett, and recorded by Bobby Vee.

Ben Weisman died in 2007 in Los Angeles, California, surrounded by friends and family.
