= The Drifters discography =

This discography focuses solely on that of American vocal group the Drifters as managed by the Treadwell family.

== Albums ==
=== Studio albums ===
Album	Album details	Peak chart positions			Certifications
Album	Album details	US	US R&B	UK	Certifications
Clyde McPhatter & the Drifters	Released: 1956; Label: Atlantic	—	—	—	
Rockin' & Driftin'	Released: 1958; Label: Atlantic	—	—	—	
Save the Last Dance for Me	Released: 1962; Label: Atlantic	—	—	—	
Under the Boardwalk (Note: "Under the Boardwalk" is a retitled and slightly amended version of The Drifters' Our Biggest Hits album released in 1964. Title was changed and a new catalog number assigned when "Under the Boardwalk" became a hit.)	Released: 1964; Label: Atlantic	40	—	—	
The Good Life with the Drifters	Released: 1965; Label: Atlantic	103	—	—	
I'll Take You Where the Music's Playing	Released: 1966; Label: Atlantic	—	—	—	
The Drifters Now	Released: 1973; Label: Bell	—	—	—	
Love Games	Released: 1975; Label: Bell	—	—	51	BPI: Silver
There Goes My First Love	Released: 1975; Label: Bell	—	—	—	
Every Nite's a Saturday Night	Released: 1976; Label: Bell	—	—	—	
"—" denotes releases that did not chart or were not released in that territory.

=== Compilation albums ===
Album	Album details	Peak chart positions			Certifications
Album	Album details	US	US R&B	UK	Certifications
Greatest Hits	Released: 1960; Label: Atlantic	—	—	—	
Up on the Roof – The Best of the Drifters	Released: 1963; Label: Atlantic	110	—	12	BPI: Gold
The Drifters Golden Hits	Released: 1968; Label: Atlantic	122	33	26	
Their Greatest Recordings: The Early Years	Released: 1971; Label: Atlantic	—	—	—	
24 Original Hits	Released: 1975; Label: Atlantic	—	—	2	BPI: Platinum
The Very Best Of	Released: 1986; Label: Telstar	—	—	24	BPI: Gold
The Definitive Drifters	Released: 2003; Label: Atlantic	—	—	8	BPI: Gold
The Very Best of the Drifters	Released: 2006; Label: Warner Music	—	—	46	
An Introduction to: The Drifters	Released: 2017; Label: Atlantic, Rhino	—	—	—	
"—" denotes releases that did not chart or were not released in that territory.

== Singles ==
Title (A-side / B-side) Both sides from same album except where indicated	Year	Lead singer	Chart positions				Certifications	Album
Title (A-side / B-side) Both sides from same album except where indicated	Year	Lead singer	US	US R&B	US A/C	UK	Certifications	Album
"Money Honey" / "The Way I Feel" (Non-album track)	1953	Clyde McPhatter	—	1	—	—		Clyde McPhatter & The Drifters
"Lucille" /	1954	Clyde McPhatter	—	7	—	—		Non-album track
"Such a Night"	1954	Clyde McPhatter	—	2	—	—		Clyde McPhatter & The Drifters
"Honey Love" / "Warm Your Heart"	1954	Clyde McPhatter	—	1	—	—		Clyde McPhatter & The Drifters
"Someday (You'll Want Me to Want You)" / "Bip Bam" (Non-album track)	1954	A: Clyde McPhatter & Bill Pinkney; B: Clyde McPhatter	—	—	—	—		Clyde McPhatter & The Drifters
"White Christmas" / "The Bells of St. Mary's"	1954	A: Bill Pinkney & Clyde McPhatter; B: Clyde McPhatter	80	5	—	—		Clyde McPhatter & The Drifters
"What'cha Gonna Do" / "Gone" (Non-album track)	1955	Clyde McPhatter	—	2	—	—		Clyde McPhatter & The Drifters
"Everyone's Laughing" / "Hot Ziggety"	1955	Clyde McPhatter	—	—	—	—		Non-album tracks
"Adorable" /	1955	Johnny Moore	—	1	—	—		Rockin' & Driftin'
"Steamboat"	1955	Bill Pinkney	—	5	—	—		Rockin' & Driftin'
"Ruby Baby" / "Your Promise to Be Mine"	1956	A: Johnny Moore; B: Gerhart Thrasher	—	10	—	—		Rockin' & Driftin'
"I Gotta Get Myself a Woman" / "Soldier of Fortune"	1956	A: Johnny Moore & Bill Pinkney; B: Johnny Moore	—	11	—	—		Rockin' & Driftin'
"Fools Fall in Love" / "It Was a Tear"	1957	Johnny Moore	69	10	—	—		Rockin' & Driftin'
"Drifting Away from You" /	1957	Gerhart Thrasher	—	—	—	—		Rockin' & Driftin'
"Hypnotized"	1957	Johnny Moore	79	—	—	—		Rockin' & Driftin'
"I Know" / "Yodee Yakee"	1957	Johnny Moore	—	—	—	—		Rockin' & Driftin'
"Drip Drop" /	1958	Bobby Hendricks	58	—	—	—		Rockin' & Driftin'
"Moonlight Bay"	1958	Group Ensemble	72	—	—	—		Rockin' & Driftin'
"There Goes My Baby" / "Oh My Love"	1959	Ben E. King	2	1	—	—		The Drifters' Greatest Hits
"(If You Cry) True Love, True Love" /	1959	Johnny Lee Williams	33	5	—	—		The Drifters' Greatest Hits
"Dance with Me"	1959	Ben E. King	15	2	—	17		The Drifters' Greatest Hits
"This Magic Moment" /	1960	Ben E. King	16	4	—	—		The Drifters' Greatest Hits
"Baltimore"	1960	Charlie Thomas & Elsbeary Hobbs	—	—	—	—		The Drifters' Greatest Hits
"Lonely Winds" / "Hey Senorita"	1960	Ben E. King	54	9	—	—		The Drifters' Greatest Hits
"Save the Last Dance for Me" / "Nobody but Me"	1960	Ben E. King	1	1	—	2	BPI: Silver	Save the Last Dance for Me
"I Count the Tears" /	1960	Ben E. King	17	6	—	28		Save the Last Dance for Me
"Suddenly There's a Valley"	1960	Tommy Evans & Bobby Hendricks	—	—	—	—		The Drifters' Greatest Hits
"Some Kind of Wonderful" / "Honey Bee" (Non-album track)	1961	A: Rudy Lewis; B: David Baughn	32	6	—	—		Save the Last Dance for Me
"Please Stay" / "No Sweet Lovin'"	1961	Rudy Lewis	14	13	—	—		Save the Last Dance for Me
"Sweets for My Sweet" / "Loneliness or Happiness" (from Up on the Roof – The Best of the Drifters)	1961	A: Charlie Thomas; B: Rudy Lewis	16	10	—	—		Save the Last Dance for Me
"Room Full of Tears" / "Somebody New Dancin' with You"	1961	A: Charlie Thomas; B: Rudy Lewis	72	—	—	—		Save the Last Dance for Me
"When My Little Girl Is Smiling" / "Mexican Divorce"	1962	A: Charlie Thomas; B: Rudy Lewis	28	—	—	31		Save the Last Dance for Me
"Stranger on the Shore" / "What to Do"	1962	Rudy Lewis	73	—	19	—		Up on the Roof – The Best of the Drifters
"Sometimes I Wonder" / "Jackpot" (from Save the Last Dance for Me)	1962	A: Ben E. King; B: Rudy Lewis	—	—	—	—		All Time Greatest Hits and More – 1959–1965
"Up on the Roof" / "Another Night with the Boys" (from Up on the Roof – The Best of the Drifters)	1962	Rudy Lewis	5	4	—	—	BPI: Silver	Our Biggest Hits
"On Broadway" / "Let the Music Play"	1963	Rudy Lewis	9	7	—	—		Our Biggest Hits
"If You Don't Come Back" /	1963	Johnny Moore	—	—	—	—		Our Biggest Hits
"Rat Race"	1963	Rudy Lewis	71	—	—	—		Our Biggest Hits
"I'll Take You Home" / "I Feel Good All Over"	1963	A: Johnny Moore; B: Charlie Thomas	25	24	—	37		Our Biggest Hits
"Vaya con Dios" / "In the Land of Make Believe"	1964	A: Rudy Lewis; B: Rudy Lewis & Johnny Moore	43	10	—	—		Our Biggest Hits
"One-Way Love" / "Didn't It"	1964	Johnny Moore	56	12	—	—		Our Biggest Hits
"Under the Boardwalk" / "I Don't Want to Go On Without You" (from I'll Take You Where the Music's Playing)	1964	A: Johnny Moore; B: Charlie Thomas	4	—	—	45	BPI: Silver	Under the Boardwalk
"I've Got Sand in My Shoes" / "He's Just a Playboy"	1964	Johnny Moore	33	21	—	—		I'll Take You Where the Music's Playing
"Saturday Night at the Movies" / "Spanish Lace" (from I'll Take You Where the Music's Playing)	1964	Johnny Moore	18	8	—	3 (in 1972)	BPI: Silver	The Good Life with the Drifters
"The Christmas Song" / "I Remember Christmas"	1964	Johnny Moore	—	—	—	—		Non-album tracks
"At the Club" / "Answer the Phone"	1965	Johnny Moore	43	10	—	3 (in 1972)		I'll Take You Where the Music's Playing
"Come On Over to My Place" / "Chains of Love"	1965	A: Johnny Moore; B: Charlie Thomas	60	—	—	9 (in 1972)		I'll Take You Where the Music's Playing
"Follow Me" / "The Outside World"	1965	A: Johnny Moore; B: Charlie Thomas	91	—	—	—		I'll Take You Where the Music's Playing
"I'll Take You Where the Music's Playing" / "Far from the Maddening Crowd"	1965	Johnny Moore	51	—	—	—		I'll Take You Where the Music's Playing
"Nylon Stockings" / "We Gotta Sing"	1965	Johnny Moore	—	—	—	—		Non-album tracks
"Memories Are Made of This" / "My Islands in the Sun"	1966	Johnny Moore	48	—	29	57		Non-album tracks
"Up in the Streets of Harlem" / "You Can't Love Them All"	1966	A: Johnny Moore; B: Charlie Thomas	—	—	—	52		Non-album tracks
"Baby What I Mean" / "Aretha"	1966	Johnny Moore	62	37	—	49		Non-album tracks
"Ain't It the Truth" / "Up Jumped the Devil"	1967	A: Johnny Moore; B: Bill Fredericks	—	36	—	—		Non-album tracks
"Still Burning in My Heart" / "I Need You Now"	1968	A: Johnny Moore; B: Bill Fredericks	111	—	—	—		Non-album tracks
"Steal Away" / "Your Best Friend"	1969	A: Bill Fredericks; B: Johnny Moore	—	—	—	—		Non-album tracks
"You Got to Pay Your Dues" / "Black Silk"	1970	A: Johnny Moore; B: Bill Fredericks	—	—	—	—		Non-album tracks
"A Rose by Any Other Name" / "Be My Lady"	1971	Johnny Moore	—	—	—	—		Non-album tracks
"Everynight" / "Something Tells Me (Something's Gonna Happen Tonight)"	1972	Johnny Moore	—	—	—	—		The Drifters Now
"You've Got Your Troubles" / I'm Feeling Sad (and Oh So Lonely)"	1973	Johnny Moore	—	—	—	—		The Drifters Now
"Like Sister and Brother" / "The Songs We Used to Sing"	1973	A: Bill Fredericks; B: Johnny Moore	—	—	—	7		Love Games
"Kissin' in the Back Row of the Movies" / "I'm Feeling Sad (and Oh So Lonely)" (from The Drifters Now)	1974	Johnny Moore	—	83	—	2	BPI: Silver	Love Games
"Down on the Beach Tonight" / "Say Goodbye to Angelina" (from The Drifters Now)	1974	Johnny Moore	—	—	—	7		Love Games
"Love Games" / "The Cut Is Deep"	1975	Johnny Moore	—	—	—	33		Love Games
"There Goes My First Love" / "Don't Cry on a Weekend"	1975	Johnny Moore	—	—	—	3	BPI: Silver	There Goes My First Love
"Can I Take You Home Little Girl" / "Please Help Me Down"	1975	Johnny Moore	—	—	—	10		There Goes My First Love
"Hello Happiness" / "I Can't Get Away from You" (from Love Games)	1976	Johnny Moore	—	—	—	12		There Goes My First Love
"Every Nite's a Saturday Night with You" / "I'll Get to Know Your Name Along the Way"	1976	Johnny Moore	—	—	—	29		Every Nite's a Saturday Night
"You're More Than a Number in My Little Red Book" / "Do You Have to Go Now"	1976	A: Johnny Moore & Clyde Brown; B: Johnny Moore	—	—	—	5	BPI: Silver	Every Nite's a Saturday Night
"Save the Last Dance for Me" / "When My Little Girl Is Smiling"	1979	A: Ben E. King; B: Charlie Thomas	—	—	—	69		Save the Last Dance for Me
"The Whole World"	2013	Michael Williams	—	—	—	—		
"—" denotes releases that did not chart or were not released in that territory.

=== Billboard Year-End performances ===
Year	Song	Year-End position
1959	"There Goes My Baby"	29
1960	"Save the Last Dance for Me"	26
1961	"Please Stay"	100
1963	"Up on the Roof"	64
1964	"Under the Boardwalk"	20
