= I Got Lucky =

Compilation album by Elvis Presley
- Released: October 1971
- Recorded: July 2, 1961 – September 29, 1966
- Genre: Rock
- Length: 22:29
- Label: RCA Camden

Elvis Presley chronology
| The Other Sides – Elvis Worldwide Gold Award Hits Vol. 2 (1971) | I Got Lucky (1971) | Elvis Sings The Wonderful World of Christmas (1971) |

I Got Lucky is a compilation album by American singer and musician Elvis Presley. The album, released in October 1971 on the RCA Camden label, is a follow-up to the C'mon Everybody album as it features the remaining tracks from the soundtrack EPs (previously unissued on LP) of the same four films from the first compilation plus one non-movie/non-LP track. It was certified Gold on January 6, 2004 and Platinum on September 15, 2011 by the RIAA.

== Track listing ==
Side one
| No. | Title | Writer(s) | Recording date | Length |
|---|---|---|---|---|
| 1. | "I Got Lucky" (from Kid Galahad) | Dolores Fuller, Fred Wise and Ben Weisman | October 27, 1961 | 1:58 |
| 2. | "What a Wonderful Life" (from Follow That Dream) | Jerry Livingston and Sid Wayne | July 2, 1961 | 2:29 |
| 3. | "I Need Somebody to Lean On" (from Viva Las Vegas) | Doc Pomus, Mort Shuman | July 10, 1963 | 3:03 |
| 4. | "Yoga Is as Yoga Does" (from Easy Come, Easy Go) | Gerald Nelson, Fred Burch | September 29, 1966 | 2:12 |
| 5. | "Riding the Rainbow" (from Kid Galahad) | Ben Weisman, Fred Wise | October 26, 1961 | 1:41 |

Side two
| No. | Title | Writer(s) | Recording date | Length |
|---|---|---|---|---|
| 1. | "Fools Fall in Love" | Jerry Leiber and Mike Stoller | May 28, 1966 | 2:07 |
| 2. | "The Love Machine" (from Easy Come, Easy Go) | Fred Burch, Gerald Nelson and Chuck Taylor | September 29, 1966 | 2:51 |
| 3. | "Home Is Where the Heart Is" (from Kid Galahad) | Hal David, Sherman Edwards and Donald Meyer | October 26, 1961 | 1:53 |
| 4. | "You Gotta Stop" (from Easy Come, Easy Go) | Bernie Baum, Bill Giant, Florence Kaye | September 29, 1966 | 2:20 |
| 5. | "If You Think I Don't Need You" (from Viva Las Vegas) | Gary Joe Cooper, Red West | July 9, 1963 | 2:04 |

Bonus tracks on CD reissue
| No. | Title | Writer(s) | Recording date | Length |
|---|---|---|---|---|
| 11. | "You're the Boss" (duet with Ann-Margret) (from Viva Las Vegas) | Jerry Leiber and Mike Stoller | July 11, 1963 | 2:47 |
| 12. | "Come What May" | Frank Tableporter | May 28,1966 | 2:00 |
