= You Gotta Stop =

Single by Elvis Presley

from the EP Easy Come, Easy Go
- A-side: "You Gotta Stop" "The Love Machine"
- Released: 1967
- Recorded: September 29, 1966
- Studio: Paramount Studio Recording Stage, Hollywood
- Label: RCA
- Songwriters: Bernie Baum, Bill Giant, Florence Kaye

Elvis Presley singles chronology
"Indescribably Blue" / "Fools Fall in Love" (1967)	"You Gotta Stop" / "The Love Machine" (1967)	"Long Legged Girl (with the Short Dress On)" / "That's Someone You Never Forget" (1967)

"You Gotta Stop" is a song written by Bernie Baum, Bill Giant and Florence Kaye and originally recorded by Elvis Presley for the 1967 Paramount picture Easy Come, Easy Go. It was also featured on the soundtrack EP for the movie.

In the UK, the song was released as a single with "The Love Machine" from the same movie on the opposite side. Listed as a double A-side, the single peaked at number 38 for two weeks in that country.

== Composition ==
The song was written by Bernie Baum, Bill Giant and Florence Kaye.

== Recording ==
Elvis Presley recorded the song for the film Easy Come, Easy Go on September 29, 1966, at Paramount Studio Recording Stage in Hollywood. The recording sessions featured Scotty Moore and Tiny Timbrell on guitar, Charlie McCoy on harmonica, organ and guitar, Bob Moore on bass, D.J. Fontana, Buddy Harman, Hal Blaine, Curry Tjader and Larry Bunker on drums, Emil Radocchia on percussion, Michel Rubini on harpsichord, Mike Henderson and Anthony Terran on trumpet, Butch Parker on trombone, Jerry Scheff, Meredith Flory and Willam Hood on saxophone. Additional vocals were provided by the Jordanaires.

== Critical response ==
While discussing the Easy Come, Easy Go musical numbers in his books, Robert Matthew-Walker said:

"You Gotta Stop" is more interesting; it has a slow introduction, and an unusual backing, once the frantic pace starts, with sudden breaks and fragmentary solos. Presley rises to this difficult challenge and rides the music, but it remains undistinguished.

== Track listing ==
7" single (RCA 1593, UK, 1967)
No.	Title	Writer(s)	Length
1.	"You Gotta Stop"	Bernie Baum, Bill Giant, Florence Kaye
2.	"The Love Machine"	Chuck Taylor, Fred Burch, Gerald Nelson

== Charts ==
Chart (1967)	Peak position
UK Singles (Official Charts)	38
