= The Colts (vocal group) =

- Also known as: Four Colts & a Filly
- Origin: United States, Kern County; San Joaquin Valley; Bakersfield
- Genres: Doo-wop, R&B, soul, rock-n-roll
- Years active: 1953–1993
- Labels: Vita Records, Mombo Records, Antler Records, Dot Records
- Past members: Ruben Grundy; Joe Grundy; Carl Moland; Leroy Smith; Mickey Lynn
- Website: myspace.com/the_colts/

The Colts: also known (as Four Colts & a Filly), is an American vocal group from Bakersfield, California, United States. The group's founding members consisted of a four-man line-up: lead singer Ruben Grundy, his brother Joe Grundy, Carl Moland. In 1955, while attending L.A. City College, in Los Angeles, New Jersey native Leroy Smith had joined the group. The following year later, the Colts had added singer: Mel Williams' wife, Mickey Lynn, to their lineup, and changed the group's name to Four Colts & a Filly. The Colts is best known for their version, the first recording of the popular doo-wop classic "Adorable". The Colts is also the first African American vocal group ever coming out of the San Joaquin Valley from Kern county.

== History ==
The Colts is the first of two black vocal groups that formed in Bakersfield, California during the early-1950s'. The other group was called The Paradons. The group first began performing as a group while attending L.A. City College in East Hollywood. The Colts is famous for, and remembered as the first group to record the classic doo-wop hit, "Adorable". In 1955 The Colts had caught the attention of promoter, songwriter, and manager Samuel "Buck" Ram," who had signed the group to his doo-wop and R&B production label Personality Productions. That same year, Ram had got the group a deal with an indie record label in Pasadena, California called Mambo Records. Samuel "Buck" Ram, also used the group to do recording sessions for a song he wrote called "Adorable" and the flip side of the single, "Lips as Red as Wine". The "Adorable" single was also covered by The Drifters and Little Caesar & the Romans.

The "Adordable" single was initially released on Mambo, but was switched over to Mead's new Vita Records label. In 1955, the Vita single had charted at No. 1 on the Zeke Manners show on KFWB. The group has appeared on two TV shows; The Al Jarvis's show, and Larry Finley's TV shows. The "Adorable" single had also reached the top of Cashbox's Los Angeles R&B Chart where it stayed for three months. The record did not brake out nationally following the release of The Drifters version for Atlantic Records. Eventually, Atlantic's better distribution and stronger version won out. The Drifters took "Adorable" to number No. 1 on the US Billboard R&B chart, while The Colts version originally went as high as No. 11. The Colts has toured with many artists such as Bill Haley's Comets, Frankie Lymon, Clyde McPhatter and other top acts on The Biggest Rock 'n' Roll Show of 1955.

Other popular singles by "The Colts" included: "Never No More," "Sweet Sixteen," "Honey Bun," "Oh, When You Touch Me," "I Never Knew," and "Guiding Angel." The Colts has also appeared in three doo-wop compilation produced during the 1980s and 1990s. In the 1980s, "Adorable" was featured on the Golden Era of Doowop compilation. "Adorable" also appeared on the various artist compilation, The Best of Vita Records in the 1980s, and The Groups of Vita Records, during the 1990s. The Colts is among the first African American doo-wop vocal groups on the west coast documented out of Kern County to make a Top 20s appearance on the Cashbox National Chart. The Colts is the first black vocal group from Bakersfield to sign with a doo-wop, and R&B production label. They are also the first black vocal group from Kern County to sign a record label, and the first black R&B, and doo-wop vocal group coming out of the Central Valley from Bakersfield that formed around the same time period as the Bakersfield Sound, during the early-to-mid 1950s.

== Appearances ==
- Golden Era of Doowop (1980s')
- The Best of Vita Records (1980s')
- The Al Jarvis's TV show
- Larry Finley's TV show
- The Biggest Rock 'n' Roll Show of (1955)
- The Groups of Vita Records (1993)

== Discography ==
- Mambo Records 112 - "Adorable" on the flip side- "Lips Red as Wine" (1955)
- Vita Records 112 - "Adorable" on the flip side - "Lips Red as Wine" (1955)
- Vita Records 121 - "Sweet Sixteen" on the flip side - "Honey Bun" (1956)
- Vita Records 130 - "Never, No More" on the flip side - "Hey You, Shoo Bee Ooh Bee," (1956)
- Antler Records 4003 - "Sheik of Araby" on the flip side - "Never No More" (1957)
- Antler Records 4007 - "Guiding Angel" on the flip side - "Sheik of Araby" (1957)
- Antler 4002 - "I Never Knew" on the flip side - "Oh When You Touch Me" (1958–59)
- Del-Co Records 4002 - "Oh When You Touch Me," (no B-side) (1959)
- Plaza Records 505 - "Sweet Sixteen" on the flip side - "Hey Pretty Baby" (1962)
