= One-sided Love Affair =

"One Sided Love Affair"

Single by Elvis Presley

from the album Elvis Presley
- A-side: "Money Honey"; "One Sided Love Affair"
- Released: August 1956
- Recorded: January 30, 1956
- Genre: Rockabilly, rock and roll
- Length: 2:09
- Songwriter: Bill Campbell

Elvis Presley singles chronology
"Blue Moon" / "Just Because" (1956)	"Money Honey'" / "One-Sided Love Affair" (1956)	"Shake, Rattle and Roll" / "Lawdy Miss Clawdy" (1956)

"One Sided Love Affair" (or "One-sided Love Affair") is a song by Elvis Presley from his 1956 debut album, Elvis Presley.

Later, in August in the same year (1956) it was also released as a single, with "Money Honey" on the flip side.

== Writing and recording history ==
The song (both the words and the music) was written by Bill Campbell.

Presley recorded the song on January 30, 1956, at the RCA Studio in New York.

There were six songs handpicked by A&R person Steve Sholes himself for Presley to record for his first album at the sessions, but "One-sided Love Affair" was the only one Presley liked and recorded.

In a March 24, 1956 interview, the song was cited by Presley as his favorite from the album.

== Musical style and lyrics ==
The book Song & Dance Man III: The Art of Bob Dylan note Presley's cynicism in the song, whose lyrics go:

If you wanna be loved,
baby you gotta love me too
'Cos I ain't for no one-sided love affair:

Well a fair exchange ain't no robbery
An' the whole world knows that it's true ...

The book The Art of Songwriting calls the song itself (its music and words) "unexceptional", but praises Presley's performance and the eventual result. The book Elvis Presley, Reluctant Rebel: His Life and Our Times describes "One-sided Love Affair" as a "rollicking" number, a "boogie-woogie polished to a pop gleam and without the barrelhouse danger, a concept already familiar in the swing era."

== Track listings ==
=== Singles ===
7" single (1956)

1. "Money Honey" (2:32)
2. "One Sided Love Affair" (2:10)

10" shellac single (RCa 20 6641, September 1956)

1. "Money Honey"
2. "One Sided Love Affair"

10" shellac single (1956)

1. "Tutti Frutti" (2:32)
2. "One Sided Love Affair" (2:10)

=== EPs ===
2-EP set Elvis Presley (EPB-1254, April 1956)

Side 1

1. "Blue Suede Shoes"
2. "I'm Counting on You"

Side 2

1. "Tutti Frutti"
2. "Tryin' to Get to You"

Side 3

1. "I Got a Woman"
2. "One Sided Love Affair"

Side 4

1. "I'm Gonna Sit Right Down and Cry (Over You)"
2. "I'll Never Let You Go"
