= At the Club =

At the Club may refer to:

- At the Club (album), a 1997 album by Kenickie
- At the Club (Jacquees song), 2017
- At the Club (The Drifters song), 1965
