= The Love Machine (Elvis Presley song) =

Single by Elvis Presley

from the EP Easy Come, Easy Go
- A-side: "You Gotta Stop" "The Love Machine"
- Released: 1967
- Recorded: September 29, 1966
- Studio: Paramount Studio Recording Stage, Hollywood
- Label: RCA
- Songwriters: Chuck Taylor, Fred Burch, Gerald Nelson

Elvis Presley singles chronology
"Indescribably Blue" / "Fools Fall in Love" (1967)	"You Gotta Stop" / "The Love Machine" (1967)	"Long Legged Girl (with the Short Dress On)" / "That's Someone You Never Forget" (1967)

"The Love Machine" is a song written by Chuck Taylor, Fred Burch and Gerald Nelson and originally recorded by Elvis Presley for the 1967 Paramount picture Easy Come, Easy Go. It was also featured on the soundtrack EP for the movie.

In the UK, "The Love Machine" was released as a single, with "You Gotta Stop" from the same movie on the opposite side. Listed as a double A-side, the single peaked at number 38 for two weeks in that country.

== Composition ==
The song was written by Chuck Taylor, Fred Burch and Gerald Nelson.

== Recording ==
Elvis Presley recorded the song for the film Easy Come, Easy Go on September 29, 1966, at Paramount Studio Recording Stage in Hollywood. The recording sessions featured Scotty Moore and Tiny Timbrell on guitar, Charlie McCoy on harmonica, organ and guitar, Bob Moore on bass, D.J. Fontana, Buddy Harman, Hal Blaine, Curry Tjader and Larry Bunker on drums, Emil Radocchia on percussion, Michel Rubini on harpsichord, Mike Henderson and Anthony Terran on trumpet, Butch Parker on trombone, Jerry Scheff, Meredith Flory and Willam Hood on saxophone. Additional vocals were provided by the Jordanaires.

== Critical response ==
While discussing the Easy Come, Easy Go musical numbers in his books, Robert Matthew-Walker noted that Elvis did "his considerable best" with this song and "I'll Take Love", but still could not "disguise his uncommitted performance".

== Track listing ==
7" single (RCA 1593, UK, 1967)
No.	Title	Writer(s)	Length
1.	"You Gotta Stop"	Bernie Baum, Bill Giant, Florence Kaye
2.	"The Love Machine"	Chuck Taylor, Fred Burch, Gerald Nelson

== Charts ==
Chart (1967)	Peak position
UK Singles (Official Charts)	38
