= Grant Kitchings =

American singer

- Born: July 17, 1938
- Died: April 5, 2005 (aged 66)
- Genres: Soul, R&B, pop
- Occupation: Musician
- Instrument: Vocals
- Years active: 1955–2001

Grant Kitchings was a singer who was a member of the Ravens then, in the 1970s, a member of the Drifters.

== History ==
=== 1950s ===
Kitchings was a tenor who joined a group that was going to become the King Toppers in 1955 or 1956. The group at the time consisted of Dave Colter, Don Turner, Louis Day and Jesse Hines. They had heard about him and thought he'd fit into the group. They got in touch with Kitchings via his uncle, the local barber shop owner. In 1956, the band was called the Corvettes and they had an audition and recording session with RCA Victor. The group recorded two songs with Kitchings as lead singer. One was a Tex Cornelius composition, "Angel Mine". RCA never released the recordings. Later the group changed its name to the King Toppers. In November 1956, the group had a session at Jubilee Records. They recorded a couple of songs: "You Were Waiting For Me" which featured Kitchings on lead and "Walkin' And Talkin' The Blues" which featured Welton Young as lead.

Later he was drafted into the army. After getting out in 1958 he joined the Ravens. Later he was in various versions or successions of the Ink Spots.

=== Early to mid-1970s ===
In the 1970s, he was a member of the Drifters, which were led by Johnny Moore. Prior to his joining the group they had already relocated to England. In 1972, the Drifters line-up consisted of Moore, Bill Fredericks, Kitchings, and Butch Leake. In the same year, Atlantic records released the album Saturday Night at the Club. Kitchings along with Johnny Moore, Butch Leake and Bill Fredericks was credited as co-writer on "Country to the City", "She Never Talked To Me That Way" and "Beautiful Music". Kitchings was most visible in the Drifters between 1972 and 1975. He sang, backing Johnny Moore, on their hits "Kissin' in the Back Row of the Movies" and Down on the Beach Tonight". He left the group in 1975 and was replaced by Billy Lewis.

=== Mid-1970s to 1990s ===
After leaving the Drifters in 1975 and having moved back to New York, he worked with various New York groups.

=== 1990s to 2005 ===
In the mid-1990s he was in a version of the Ink Spots. He was with Harold Winley's Ink Spots, having replaced Jim Nabbie, who suddenly died in September 1992. Shortly before he died, he named Grant Hitchings to be his successor as lead tenor. Around 1994, the group consisted of Sonny Hatchett, Kitchings, Morris Dow and Harold Winley. Later on, health problems saw him leave the group. He had become ill while the group was doing a show on the Mississippi Queen. He was replaced by Herman Denby.

He died in 2005 from complications related to diabetes at 66 years of age.

== Recordings ==
=== As lead singer ===
The Corvettes

- Angel Mine – RCA (Unreleased) – 1956
- Unknown track – RCA (Unreleased) – 1956

The King Toppers

- "You Were Waiting for Me" – JOSIE 811 – 1957
