= Elvis Presley (album) =

Studio album by Elvis Presley
- Released: March 23, 1956
- Recorded: July 5, 1954 – January 31, 1956
- Studios: RCA Studio B, Nashville; RCA Victor, New York City; Sun, Memphis
- Genres: Rock and roll; rockabilly
- Length: 28:03
- Label: RCA Victor
- Producers: Sam Phillips (Sun recordings); Stephen H. Sholes (RCA Victor recordings)

Elvis Presley chronology
Elvis Presley (1956)	Elvis (1956)

Singles from Elvis Presley
- 1. "Blue Suede Shoes" Released: August 31, 1956; 2. "I Got a Woman" Released: August 31, 1956; 3. "I'll Never Let You Go (Little Darlin')" Released: August 31, 1956; 4. "I Love You Because" Released: August 31, 1956; 5. "Just Because" Released: August 31, 1956; 6. "Money Honey" Released: August 31, 1956

Elvis Presley (released in the UK as Elvis Presley Rock n' Roll) is the debut studio album by American singer Elvis Presley, released by RCA Victor on March 23, 1956. The recording sessions took place on January 10 and January 11 at the RCA Victor Studios in Nashville, Tennessee, and on January 30 and January 31 at the RCA Victor studios in New York. Additional material originated from sessions at Sun Studio in Memphis, Tennessee, on July 5, August 19 and September 10, 1954, and on July 11, 1955.

The album spent ten weeks at number one on the Billboard Top Pop Albums chart in 1956, the first rock and roll album ever to make it to the top of the charts, and the first million-selling album of that genre. In 2003 and 2012, it was ranked number 56 on Rolling Stone's list of the 500 greatest albums of all time, and at number 332 in a 2020 revised list. Elvis Presley was also one of three Presley albums to receive accolades in the reference book 1001 Albums You Must Hear Before You Die. It was certified gold on November 1, 1966, and platinum on August 8, 2011, by the Recording Industry Association of America.

The original 1956 UK album titled Rock n' Roll was issued by EMI on the His Master's Voice label, Catalog Number: CLP 1093, with different tracks.

== Background ==
By the second half of 1955, singles on Sun Records by Presley began making the national country and western singles chart, "Baby Let's Play House" and "I Forgot to Remember to Forget" going to number 5 and number 1 respectively. Colonel Tom Parker, Presley's new manager, had extensive dealings with RCA Victor and producer Steve Sholes, through his previous client, singer Eddy Arnold. On November 21, 1955, RCA Victor purchased Presley's contract from Sam Phillips, the head of Sun Records for the then-enormous sum of $40,000. Presley and rock and roll were still untested properties for the major records labels but this album, along with the number one single "Heartbreak Hotel", proved the selling power of both: it was the first RCA Victor pop album to earn more than $1,000,000, and in 1956 it had sold over one million units.

== Content ==
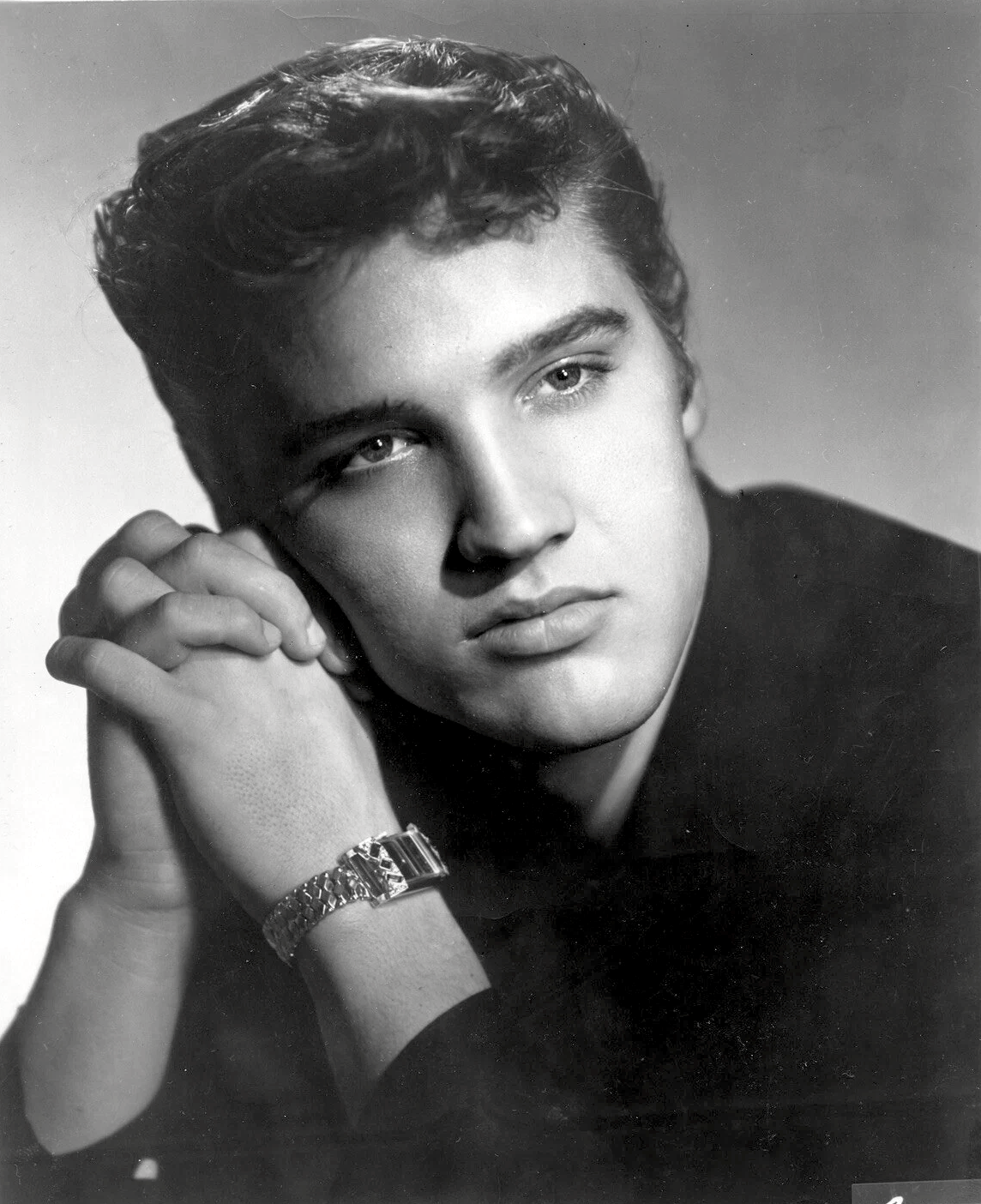
Presley in 1955

Presley made appearances in four consecutive weeks on the Dorsey Brothers television program Stage Show in early 1956, on January 28, February 4, February 11, and February 18. RCA wanted an album in the stores fast to capitalize both on the nationwide TV exposure and the success of his first hit single on the pop charts with "Heartbreak Hotel", swiftly climbing to the top after its release on January 27. At the same time, there had been only two series of Presley recording sessions for RCA Victor by the end of the Dorsey stint, after which Presley and his band were back on the road. Those two sessions yielded an additional eleven tracks, almost enough to fill an entire LP, although some tracks had singles potential. In the 1950s, general practice dictated tracks having greater commercial potential to be released as singles, with tracks of lesser appeal placed on albums; as such, RCA Victor neither took all eleven tracks and simply made an album, nor placed the already released and briskly selling "Heartbreak Hotel" on it. The rights to the Sun Studio tapes had transferred to RCA Victor with the sale of his contract, so five previously unreleased Sun songs, "I Love You Because", "Just Because", "Tryin' to Get to You", "I'll Never Let You Go (Little Darlin')", and "Blue Moon" were added to seven of the RCA Victor sessions tracks to bring the running time of the album up to an acceptable length. Phillips produced the sessions at Sun, and no producer was officially listed for the RCA Victor sessions, leading to the belief that Presley himself produced them.

As the Sun tracks were mostly country-styled, Elvis and RCA Victor leavened the selections with covers of recent rhythm and blues songs. Two of these, "Money Honey" by Jesse Stone, known to Elvis from a version by Clyde McPhatter, and Ray Charles' 1955 hit "I Got a Woman", had been in Presley's live act for a year. A third was the frenetic announcement to the world of the existence of Little Richard in 1955, "Tutti Frutti". A rockabilly number that was believed to be a potential hit and could hold its own with the R&B material, "Blue Suede Shoes", was not initially released as a single from a promise by Sholes to Sam Phillips to protect the career of another Sun artist, Carl Perkins, the author of the song. Instead, it was diverted into being the opening track on the album.

On August 31, 1956, RCA Victor took the unusual step of releasing the entire album as singles, which undoubtedly kept the new single released simultaneously, "Shake, Rattle and Roll" backed with "Lawdy Miss Clawdy", from reaching the charts. However, "Blue Suede Shoes", released in single form as a part of this experiment by RCA Victor, kept the promise to Phillips and Perkins by waiting over eight months since the song's release on Sun. It had however, been the lead song on two earlier EPs which sold well enough to make it to number 20 on the singles chart the week of April 28.

== Critical reception ==
Professional ratings
Review scores
Source	Rating
AllMusic	5/5 stars
Encyclopedia of Popular Music	5/5 stars
MusicHound	4.5/5 stars
The Rolling Stone Album Guide	5/5 stars
Rough Guides	5/5 stars
Sputnikmusic	5/5

== Artwork ==
The cover is ranked number 40 on Rolling Stone's list of the 100 greatest album covers, published in 1991. The photograph of Elvis was taken at the Fort Homer Hesterly Armory in Tampa, Florida, on July 31, 1955. Initially, it was thought that Popsie Randolph took the image featured on the front cover, since the album only credited one photographer. However, in August 2002, Joseph A. Tunzi documented that the actual photographer was William V. "Red" Robertson of Robertson & Fresch. The Popsie credit attributed to the album only applied to a series of photos featured on the back cover, taken in New York City in early December 1955, shortly after Presley had signed with RCA Victor. Tunzi was quoted in the Tampa Tribune as saying, "Forget about Popsie. Popsie did not take that photo."

The graphic and photo were also used on an EP and a double-EP comprising songs from this album, also released in March 1956.

The design was echoed by the Clash for the front of their 1979 album London Calling; that cover is number 39 on the Rolling Stone list of 100 greatest album covers noted previously. Other acts of cover homage include F-Punk by Big Audio Dynamite in 1995, Reintarnation in 2006 by k.d. lang, Chumbawamba's controversial single "Tony Blair", and Cliff Richard’s 2018 album Rise Up.

== Reissues ==
RCA first reissued the original 12 track album on compact disc in 1984. This issue, which was remixed in fake stereo, was quickly withdrawn and the disc was reissued in original monophonic.

In 1999, RCA reissued the album with an altered running order, adding on six bonus tracks from three non-album singles, including the chart-toppers "Heartbreak Hotel" and "I Want You, I Need You, I Love You".

In 2005, the album was reissued again, remastered using DSD technology with the original sequencing restored and the six bonus tracks appended to the end of the disc.

A two CD set was released on the Follow That Dream collectors label on August 15, 2006, with bonus tracks and numerous alternate takes.

== Track listing ==
=== Original release ===
Side one
No.	Title	Writer(s)	Recording date	Length
1.	"Blue Suede Shoes"	Carl Perkins	January 30, 1956	2:00
2.	"I'm Counting on You"	Don Robertson	January 11, 1956	2:25
3.	"I Got a Woman"	Ray Charles; Renald Richard	January 10, 1956	2:25
4.	"One Sided Love Affair"	Bill Campbell	January 30, 1956	2:11
5.	"I Love You Because"	Leon Payne	July 5, 1954	2:43
6.	"Just Because"	Bob Shelton; Joe Shelton; Sydney Robin	September 10, 1954	2:34

Side two
No.	Title	Writer(s)	Recording date	Length
1.	"Tutti Frutti"	Dorothy LaBostrie; Richard Wayne Penniman	January 31, 1956	1:59
2.	"Tryin' to Get to You"	Rose Marie McCoy; Charles Singleton	July 11, 1955	2:31
3.	"I'm Gonna Sit Right Down and Cry (over You)"	Howard Biggs; Joe Thomas	January 31, 1956	2:01
4.	"I'll Never Let You Go (Little Darlin')"	Jimmy Wakely	September 10, 1954	2:24
5.	"Blue Moon"	Richard Rodgers; Lorenz Hart	August 19, 1954	2:40
6.	"Money Honey"	Jesse Stone	January 10, 1956	2:35

=== UK edition ===
Side one

1. "Blue Suede Shoes"
2. "I Got a Woman"
3. "I'm Counting on You"
4. "I'm Left, You're Right, She's Gone"
5. "That's All Right"
6. "Money Honey

Side two

1. "Mystery Train"
2. "I'm Gonna Sit Right Down and Cry (over You)"
3. "Trying to Get to You"
4. "One Sided Love Affair"
5. "Lawdy, Miss Clawdy"
6. "Shake, Rattle and Roll"

== Personnel ==
- Elvis Presley – vocals, acoustic guitar, piano (on "Tryin' To Get to You")
- Scotty Moore – electric guitar
- Chet Atkins – acoustic guitar on "I'm Counting on You" and "Money Honey"
- Floyd Cramer – piano on January 10–11
- Shorty Long – piano on January 30–31
- Bill Black – bass
- D. J. Fontana – drums except "I Love You Because", "Just Because", "Tryin' to Get to You", "I'll Never Let You Go (Little Darlin')", and "Blue Moon"
- Johnny Bernero – drums (on "Tryin' to Get to You")
- Gordon Stoker – backing vocals
- Ben Speer – backing vocals
- Brock Speer – backing vocals
- Doug Poindexter – percussion/guitar on "Just Because"

== Charts ==
Chart (1956)	Peak position
UK Albums (Official Charts)	1
US Billboard 200	1
US Albums (Cashbox)	1

Chart (1977)	Peak position
Norwegian Albums (VG-lista)	20

== Certifications ==
Region	Certification	Certified units/sales
United Kingdom (BPI)	Silver	200,000^{‡}
United States (RIAA)	Platinum	1,000,000^{^}
^{^} Shipments figures based on certification alone.^{‡} Sales+streaming figures based on certification alone.

== See also ==
- Classic Albums
