= Easy Come, Easy Go (EP) =

EP (soundtrack) by Elvis Presley
- Released: March 1, 1967
- Recorded: September 28 and 29, 1966
- Studio: Paramount (Hollywood)
- Genre: Pop
- Length: 13:41
- Label: RCA Victor
- Producer: Joseph Lilley

Elvis Presley chronology
How Great Thou Art (1967)	Easy Come, Easy Go (1967)	Double Trouble (1967)

Singles from Easy Come, Easy Go
- 1. "You Gotta Stop / The Love Machine" Released: 1967 (UK)

Professional ratings
Review scores
Source	Rating
AllMusic	Unrated

Easy Come, Easy Go is an EP by American singer Elvis Presley, containing songs from the motion picture of the same name, released by RCA Victor on March 1, 1967.

== Recording and release history ==
Recording sessions took place on September 28 and 29, 1966, at Paramount Studio in Hollywood, California. After the relative freedom of the Nashville sessions in May that yielded How Great Thou Art and other songs more to his taste, Presley was reportedly unhappy with the quality of the songs selected for the film, allegedly referring to the selections as "shit" during the recording session. It is often reported that Presley recorded "Leave My Woman Alone" for the film, but only an instrumental backing was ever recorded; Presley never recorded a vocal for the song. Seven selections were recorded for the film; the song "She's a Machine" was not used in the movie, but would be released on Elvis Sings Flaming Star the following year.

The remaining six appeared on an extended play single released to coincide with the March 1967 premiere of the film. It failed to chart on the Billboard Hot 100, and sold fewer than 30,000 units total. Given that the EP format was no longer a viable marketing medium, and the poor performance of Easy Come, Easy Go, it was the final release of new material by Presley in the EP format. The British issue, however, did top the UK EP charts despite featuring only four of the six tracks on the US edition ("The Love Machine" and "You Gotta Stop" were omitted, but were released on a separate single there).

In the film, Presley sings "Yoga is as Yoga Does" in duet with Elsa Lanchester. As was commonplace with Presley soundtrack releases, the version on the EP is a solo vocal.

== Track listing ==
Side one
No.	Title	Writer(s)	Recording date	Length
1.	"Easy Come, Easy Go"	Sid Wayne and Ben Weisman	September 28, 1966	2:07
2.	"The Love Machine"	Chuck Taylor, Fred Burch, Gerald Nelson	September 29, 1966	2:51
3.	"Yoga Is As Yoga Does"	Fred Burch and Gerald Nelson	September 29, 1966	2:10

Side two
No.	Title	Writer(s)	Recording date	Length
1.	"You Gotta Stop"	Bernie Baum, Bill Giant, Florence Kaye	September 29, 1966	2:20
2.	"Sing You Children"	Fred Burch and Gerald Nelson	September 28, 1966	2:00
3.	"I'll Take Love"	Dolores Fuller and Mark Barker	September 28, 1966	2:13

== Personnel ==
- Elvis Presley – vocals
- The Jordanaires – background vocals
- Anthony Terran – trumpet
- Mike Henderson – trumpet
- Butch Parker – trombone
- Meredith Flory – saxophone
- William Hood – saxophone
- Scotty Moore – lead guitar
- Tiny Timbrell – rhythm guitar
- Charlie McCoy – acoustic guitar, organ, harmonica
- Michel Rubini – harpsichord
- Bob Moore – double bass
- D.J. Fontana – drums
- Buddy Harman – drums
- Hal Blaine – drums
- Emil Radocchia – percussion
- Curry Tjader – percussion
- Larry Bunker – percussion
