= Popsie Randolph =

Greek-American photograher

William “Popsie” Randolph
- Born: May 15, 1920; New York City, New York
- Died: January 21, 1978 (aged 57); Cave Creek, Arizona
- Occupation: Photographer
- Writing career
- Genre: Music

William “PoPsie” Randolph (March 26, 1920 – January 6, 1978) was a US photographer of Greek descent. The son of Greek immigrants, Randolph capitalized on his early success in photography of the New York music scene from the 1940s by continuing to photograph many of the music industry's greats but also movie stars, athletes and politicians including Robert F. Kennedy during the release of the "Kennedy Years" recordings.

== Photography career ==
“PoPsie” was there for the jump from the studio-crafted pop of Tin Pan Alley to the rhythms of rock and roll and the uptown sounds of rhythm & blues into the soul that laid much of the foundation of contemporary music. The 100,000 negatives and prints left behind after Randolph's death in 1978 constitute a vast collection. The range of the material includes: When Frank Sinatra was named "King of the Singers" at The Copa during a broadcast on WINS with comic Phil Silvers officiating. When Elvis Presley came to New York to cut his first records for RCA Victor. Bobby Darin signing with Atlantic Records (for the string of hits that included the smash "Mack the Knife"). When Harry Belafonte entered a New York studio to launch the mid-1950s calypso craze. He also photographed all of the major teen idols through the years from Eddie Fisher and Tab Hunter to Frankie Avalon, Jimmy Clanton and Fabian.

== Funny Pairings ==
Another facet of the "PoPsie" style and collection was his affinity for odd couples: Chuck Berry jamming with Trini Lopez ("If I Had a Hammer"); Perry Como at the piano with Brenda Lee; Alan Freed trading one-liners with Salvador Dalí; Count Basie backing up Pat Boone on a TV special; Dr. Joyce Brothers interviewing the Beatles; Welsh singer Tom Jones hanging out with the Rolling Stones during their first visit to America at the New York Playboy Club; Nat "King" Cole meeting composer W. C. Handy ("St. Louis Blues"); Ella Fitzgerald nightclubbing with Billie Holiday. "Popsie" also captured the times when the music world carried over to other areas like sports and politics. He photographed Jackie Robinson and Buddy Johnson when they collaborated on the single "Did You See Jackie Robinson Hit That Ball?"

== Well known photographs ==
- Miles Davis, Jazz Trumpeter, 1953
- Elvis Presley, First album, 1956
- Brill Building, Portraits, 1945–1973

Though Randolph has been attributed for his photographs on Elvis Presley, he did not take the front cover photograph, as this was taken by William V. Robertson of Robertson & Fresch.

== Books about Popsie ==
PoPsie's work is featured in the book PoPsie by Michael Randolph, with a foreword by Quincy Jones, published by Hal Leonard Corporation. His photographs have also been exhibited at Chartwell Booksellers in New York City, the Smithsonian's National Museum of American History, the Grammy Museum in Los Angeles, the Rock and Roll Hall of Fame, and the Brooklyn Museum.
