= Honey Love (The Drifters song) =

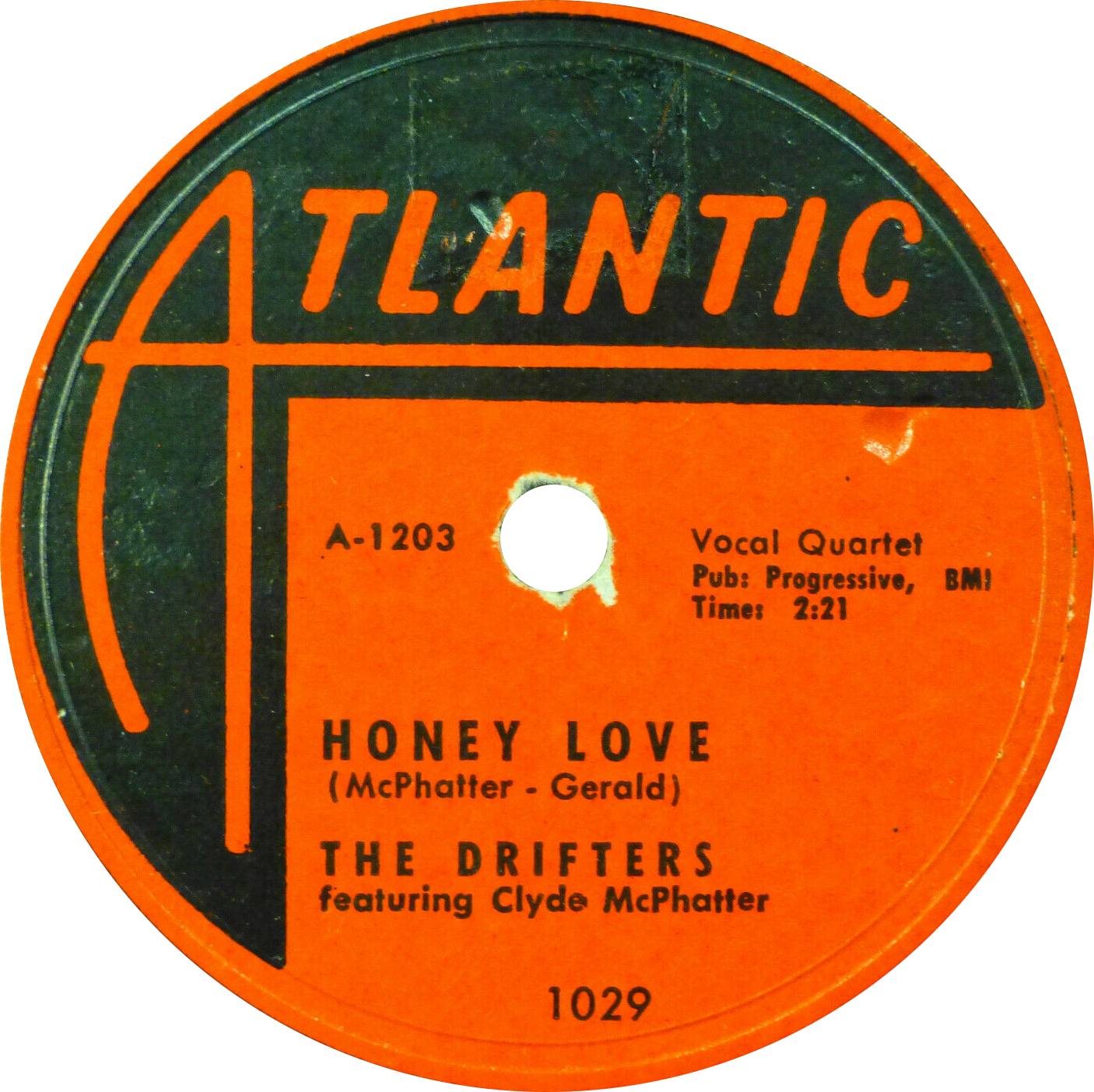
- Side A of US 10-inch (78 RPM) single

Single by The Drifters featuring Clyde McPhatter
- B-side: "Warm Your Heart"
- Released: May 1954
- Genre: R&B Doo-Wop
- Label: Atlantic
- Songwriter(s): Clyde McPhatter / Jerry Wexler
- Producer(s): Ahmet Ertegun and Jerry Wexler

The Drifters singles chronology
"Such a Night"/"Lucille" (1954)	"Honey Love" (1954)	"Someday (You'll Want Me to Want You)" (1954)

"Honey Love" is a 1954 song by The Drifters featuring Clyde McPhatter, written by McPhatter and Jerry Wexler. With influences taken from calypso music, "Honey Love" was the group's third single release, fourth release on the charts and second number one single on the R&B chart.

== Background ==
Soon after release, the song was targeted by police in Memphis, confiscating copies of the record before they could be loaded into local jukeboxes due to their objection to what they described as 'suggestive lyrics' in the song.

== See also ==
- List of number-one rhythm and blues hits (United States)
