= Johnny Moore (singer) =

Background information
- Born: John Alfred Moore; December 14, 1934; Selma, Alabama, United States
- Died: December 30, 1998 (aged 64) London, England
- Genres: R&B, pop
- Occupation: Singer
- Instrument: Vocals

John Alfred Moore (December 14, 1934 – December 30, 1998) was an American rhythm and blues singer with the Drifters. He was one of the group's principal lead singers, leading on many of their hit singles, and was a 1988 inductee into the Rock and Roll Hall of Fame with The Drifters.

== Career ==
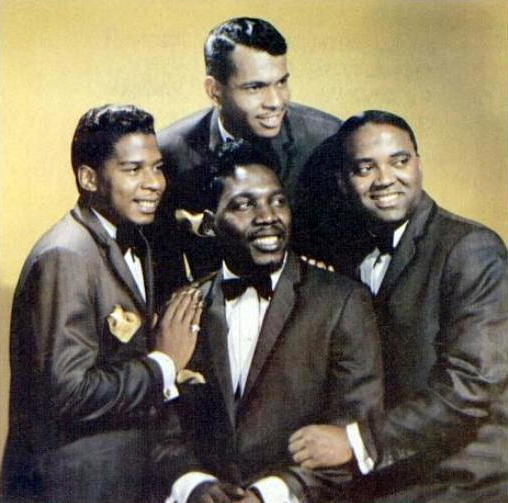
The Drifters in 1964 Clockwise, left to right: Eugene Pearson, Johnny Terry, Charlie Thomas, and Moore.

Born in Selma, Alabama, United States, Moore began as lead of the Cleveland based group the Hornets, before being discovered by the Drifters. He joined the group as lead vocalist in New York in 1955, at age 21. He was drafted into the US Army for national service; upon returning, he recorded as a soloist under the name "Johnny Darrow". He rejoined the Drifters, now with four new members, and became the lead singer in 1964, after the death of Rudy Lewis, who was due to record "Under the Boardwalk" the next day. Moore took over the lead vocals.

Subsequently, he became permanent lead. Moore had a string of hits with the group in the 1960s, most notably "Saturday Night at the Movies", "Come On Over to My Place", "At the Club" and "Up in the Streets of Harlem". He remained with the group touring the United Kingdom from early 1970 to 1998, establishing him as the group's longest-serving member.

=== United Kingdom ===
Having relocated to the UK in the early 1970s, Moore and the group scored with a string of hits, "Kissin' in the Back Row of the Movies", "There Goes My First Love", "Can I Take You Home Little Girl", "Hello Happiness" and "You're More Than a Number in My Little Red Book".

In 1982, exhausted, he left the group and then launched his own group based in London.

== Death ==
Moore died en route to London's Mayday Hospital; the cause of death was ruled to be pneumonia. He was 64.

== Awards and honors ==
- In 1988, Moore was inducted into the Rock and Roll Hall of Fame.
- Moore was given a posthumous Pioneer Award in 1999 by the Rhythm and Blues Foundation.
