= Rudy Lewis =

American singer (1936–1964)

- Born: Charles Rudolph Harrell; August 23, 1936; Philadelphia, Pennsylvania, U.S.
- Died: May 20, 1964 (aged 27) Harlem, New York City, New York, U.S.
- Genre: Rhythm and blues
- Occupation: Singer
- Formerly of: The Drifters

Rudy Lewis (born Charles Rudolph Harrell; August 23, 1936 – May 20, 1964) was an American rhythm and blues singer known for his work with the Drifters. In 1988, he was posthumously inducted into the Rock and Roll Hall of Fame.

== Career ==
Lewis began his singing career in gospel music. He was one of only two males to have sung with the Clara Ward Singers and sang with the gospel group right up to the day before he auditioned for The Drifters at Philadelphia's Uptown Theater. Drifters manager George Treadwell hired Lewis on the spot to be the group's lead vocalist, a position formerly held by Ben E. King. Lewis ended up performing most of King's repertoire live in concert.

Lewis sang lead on a string of hits, including "Please Stay", "Some Kind of Wonderful", "Up On The Roof" and "On Broadway". He was also featured on other notable tracks including "Another Night With The Boys", "Beautiful Music", "Jackpot", "Let The Music Play", "Loneliness Or Happiness", "Mexican Divorce", "Only In America", "Rat Race", "She Never Talked To Me That Way", "Somebody New Dancing With You", "Stranger on the Shore", "Vaya Con Dios" and "What To Do".

In April 1963, Lewis recorded his solo single "Baby I Dig Love" along with the B-side "I've Loved You So Long". The record was released the following month, but never reached the charts. He was a member of the Drifters from late 1960 until his untimely death in 1964. In 1988, Lewis was inducted into the Rock and Roll Hall of Fame as a member of the Drifters.

== Personal life ==
Lewis was born in Philadelphia, Pennsylvania. He moved to New York City at the age of 24 after joining the Drifters. According to Billy Vera, Lewis was a closeted homosexual, addicted to heroin and suffered from binge eating disorder. Lewis's health problems were not publicly disclosed until the release of the liner notes of the CD box set Rockin & Driftin: The Drifters Box (1996).

== Death ==
On May 21, 1964, when the group was due to record "Under the Boardwalk," which had been written for Lewis, he was found dead in his Harlem hotel room, where he had died the previous night. Former lead vocalist Johnny Moore was brought back to perform lead vocals for the recording. The next day, the Drifters recorded "I Don't Want to Go On Without You" which was led by Charlie Thomas in tribute to Lewis.

An autopsy was never performed, and authorities ruled his death as a probable drug overdose. However, close friends and family believe he died from a mixture of a drug overdose, asphyxiation, and a heart attack. Dying at the age of 27 made Lewis an early member of the 27 Club.

== Discography ==
=== Solo singles ===
US releases
Title	Catalogue	Year	Notes #
"Rainbow In My Eyes" / "Nobody Knows"	Red Top RT 124	1959	
"Baby I Dig Love"/"I've Loved You So Long"	Atlantic 45-2193	1963	
