= Easy Come, Easy Go (Elvis Presley song) =

Song by Elvis Presley

from the album Easy Come, Easy Go
- Released: 1967
- Recorded: September 28, 1966
- Length: 2:07
- Songwriter(s): Ben Weisman (music); Sid Wayne (lyrics)
- Producer(s): Steve Sholes

"Easy Come, Easy Go" is a song first recorded by Elvis Presley as part of the soundtrack for his 1967 motion picture Easy Come, Easy Go.

Its first release was on the soundtrack EP "Easy Come, Easy Go" in spring 1967.

The Australian Kent Music Report (calculated in retrospect using archival data) lists the song / the EP "Easy Come, Easy Go" on the singles chart for 5 weeks, with the peak of 78 on the week of May 13, 1967.

== Writing and recording history ==
The song was written by Ben Weisman (music) and Sid Wayne (lyrics).

Presley recorded it on September 28, 1966, at the September 28–29 soundtrack sessions for the Paramount movie Easy Come, Easy Go at the Paramount Studio Recording Stage in Hollywood, California.

== Track listings ==
=== Single ===
7-inch single (The Gramophone Company of India Ltd., India, 1969)

A. "Easy Come, Easy Go" (2:10)
B. "The Love Machine" (2:47)

=== EP ===
7-inch EP (RCA EPA 4387, March 1967)
7-inch EP (RCA Victor 20624, Australia, 1978)

1. "Easy Come, Easy Go" (2:09)
2. "The Love Machine" (2:47)
3. "Yoga Is As Yoga Does" (2:08)
4. "You Gotta Stop" (2:16)
5. "Sing You Children" (2:06)
6. "I'll Take Love" (2:12)

7-inch EP (RCA Victor RCX-7187, UK, June 1967)

1. "Easy Come, Easy Go"
2. "Yoga Is As Yoga Does"
3. "Sing You Children"
4. "I'll Take Love"

== Charts ==
| Chart (1967) | Peak position |
|---|---|
| Australia (retrospect Kent Music Report) | 78 (EP) |
