= Indescribably Blue =

1967 Elvis Presley song

Single by Elvis Presley
- B-side: "Fools Fall in Love"
- Released: January 10, 1967
- Recorded: June 10, 1966
- Studio: RCA Studio B, Nashville
- Genre: Pop
- Label: RCA Victor
- Songwriter: Darrell Glenn

Elvis Presley singles chronology
"If Every Day Was Like Christmas" (1966)	"Indescribably Blue" / "Fools Fall in Love" (1967)	"You Gotta Stop" / "The Love Machine" (1967)

"Indescribably Blue" is a song written by Darrell Glenn and recorded by Elvis Presley on June 10, 1966. It was released by RCA Records as a single on January 10, 1967, backed with "Fools Fall in Love". The song peaked at No. 33 on the Billboard Hot 100 singles chart on February 24, 1967.

Jerry Schilling, a member of Presley's entourage, described "Indescribably Blue" as "an intense, emotional, vocally demanding ballad". Biographer Peter Guralnick described the song as "a pretty, somewhat insipid ballad".

== Charts ==
Chart (1967)	Peak position
UK Singles (OCC)	21
US Billboard Hot 100	33
