= Kissin' in the Back Row of the Movies =

Single by The Drifters
- B-side: "I'm Feeling Sad (And Oh So Lonely)"
- Released: June 1974
- Label: Bell
- Songwriters: Roger Greenaway, Tony Macaulay
- Producers: Billy Davis, Roger Cook, Roger Greenaway

The Drifters singles chronology
"Like Sister and Brother" (1973)	"Kissin' in the Back Row of the Movies" (1974)	"Down on the Beach Tonight" (1974)

"Kissin' in the Back Row of the Movies" is a song originally recorded by The Drifters in 1974. It was the second of four charting singles released from their Love Games LP. Johnny Moore is the lead singer.

The song reached the Top 10 in the UK, the second of three to do so. "Kissin' in the Back Row of the Movies" also reached the Top 10 in Australia.

== Composition ==
Interviewed on BBC Radio 2 in 2022, the song's co-writer Roger Greenaway said he had to persuade Johnny Moore to record the song after Moore questioned the appropriateness of a man of his age performing lyrics such as "When I pick her up from school" and "When her homework's done". Greenaway said he managed to convince Moore to put his voice to the record by insisting Drifters fans would be unconcerned by the lyrics and that the song would be a hit. After the song was released and reached Number 2 in the UK Singles Chart, Moore admitted he had been wrong to question the song and from that point on referred to Greenaway as "The Doctor".

== Chart history ==
=== Weekly charts ===
Chart (1974)	Peak position
Argentina	5
Australia (Kent Music Report)	7
Ireland (IRMA)	2
South Africa (Springbok)	3
UK	2
U.S. Billboard R&B	83

=== Year-end charts ===
Chart (1974)	Rank
Australia (Kent Music Report)	64
UK	22
