= Lucille (The Drifters song) =

Single by Clyde McPhatter and The Drifters
- A-side: "Such a Night"
- Released: January 1954
- Genre: R&B
- Length: 2:59
- Label: Atlantic; 1019
- Songwriter(s): Clyde McPhatter

Clyde McPhatter and The Drifters singles chronology
| "Money Honey" (August 1953) | "Lucille" (1954) | "Honey Love" (May 1954) |

"Lucille" is a song written by Clyde McPhatter and performed by Clyde McPhatter and The Drifters. In 1954, the track reached No. 7 on the U.S. R&B chart.
