= Money Honey (Clyde McPhatter and the Drifters song) =

1953 song written and composed by Jesse Stone

Single by Clyde McPhatter and the Drifters
- B-side: "The Way I Feel"
- Released: September 1953
- Recorded: August 9, 1953
- Studio: Atlantic Studios
- Genre: Rock and roll
- Label: Atlantic (45-1006)
- Songwriter: Jesse Stone

Clyde McPhatter and the Drifters singles chronology
"Money Honey" (1953)	"Such a Night"/"Lucille" (1954)

"Money Honey" is a song written by Jesse Stone, which was released in September 1953 as the first single by Clyde McPhatter backed for the first time by the newly formed Drifters. McPhatter's voice, but not his name, had become well known when he was the lead singer for Billy Ward and the Dominoes. The song was an immediate hit and remained on the rhythm and blues chart for 23 weeks, peaking at number 1. Rolling Stone magazine ranked it number 252 on its list of the 500 Greatest Songs of All Time. The recording was reported to have sold more than two million copies by 1968.

== Composition ==
The song begins with the man who has run out of money encountering his landlord who demands the rent if the man wishes to stay. Desperate, he calls "the woman that (he loves) the best" to help him out. When he meets her, she asks the man what he wants from her. The man's reply is:

Money, honey
Money, honey
Money, honey, if you want to get along with me

She is literally not buying and scolds the man for his words; she says that "(their) romance is through", meaning that she is breaking up with him. When the man asks about "another man taking (his) place", the woman mimics his words, possibly to show that she loves the other man, who already has money. In the end, the man says that he has learned his lesson, but, soon enough, is still desperate for money.

== The recording ==
The song was recorded on August 9, 1953, at Atlantic Studios, with Clyde McPhatter (lead), Bill Pinkney (first tenor), Andrew "Bubba" Thrasher (second tenor), Gerhart "Gay" Thrasher (baritone), and Willie Ferbee (bass). Walter Adams was the guitarist for the record.

The recording features Mickey Baker on guitar and Sam "the Man" Taylor on tenor sax. The arrangement starts with a bagpipe-like drone from the Drifters setting up a shuffle rhythm. McPhatter's voice is clear and bright and in the midst of the sax solo he gives off a monumental scream.

== Track listing ==
No.	Title	Writer(s)	Length
1.	"Money Honey"	Jesse Stone	2:59
2.	"The Way I Feel"	Parker	2:48

== Covers ==
- Most notably, Elvis Presley recorded a cover version of "Money Honey" in 1956 for his debut LP, Elvis Presley.
- Wanda Jackson recorded the number in 1958 and it appeared in the UK on her Capitol EP Let's Have a Party.
- The song was also covered by Eddie Cochran in a 1959 live performance and released in 1999 on the album The Town Hall Party Shows.
- The Hollywood Flames released a version of the song as the B-side of their 1960 single "My Heart's on Fire".
- Clyde McPhatter rerecorded the song for Mercury Records; it is on the 1962 album Lover Please and on his 1963 Mercury release, Greatest Hits.
- Little Richard covered the song for his 1964 album Little Richard Is Back (And There's a Whole Lotta Shakin' Goin' On!) for Vee-Jay Records.
- The guitarist Davy Graham recorded it for his 1966 album Midnight Man.
- The Jackson 5 recorded a version for Motown Records from 1971 to 1975. It is one of 19 "rare and unreleased" tracks on the fourth CD of the Michael Jackson five-CD box set Soulsation!, issued in June 1995 in the US and July 1995 in the UK. A demo version is known to exist.
- Ry Cooder recorded a cover version for his 1972 album, Into the Purple Valley.
- Gary Glitter recorded the song for his 1973 album Touch Me.
- The Sensational Alex Harvey Band covered it on their 1974 album The Impossible Dream, making it the first part of a medley, the second part being the title song, "The Impossible Dream".
- The Flying Burrito Brothers recorded the song on their 1974 compilation album Close Up The Honky Tonks.
- The Coasters also released a version of the song.
- Kristin Berglund included the song on her second album, Long Distance Love (1979).
- Aaron Neville recorded it for his 2013 album My True Story.
- 38 Special covered the song on their 1979 album Rockin' into the Night.
- "Money Honey" was performed about 75 times by various iterations of the Jerry Garcia Band between April 1972 and 1995.
