= Adorable (song) =

Single by The Drifters

from the album Rockin' & Driftin'
- B-side: "Steamboat"
- Released: October 1955
- Genre: R&B
- Length: 2:37
- Label: Atlantic; 1078
- Songwriter: Buck Ram

The Drifters singles chronology
"What'cha Gonna Do" (February 1955)	"Adorable" (1955)	"Ruby Baby" (March 31, 1956)

"Adorable" is a song written by Buck Ram and performed by The Drifters. In 1955, the track reached No. 1 on the U.S. R&B chart.

It was featured on their 1958 album, Rockin' & Driftin'.

== Other charting versions ==
- The Colts released the original version of the song as a single in 1955, which reached No. 11 on the U.S. R&B chart.
- The Fontane Sisters featuring Billy Vaughn's Orchestra released a version of the song as a single in 1955 which reached No. 71 on the U.S. pop chart.
