= Like Sister and Brother =

Single by The Drifters

from the album Love Games
- B-side: "The Songs We Used to Sing"
- Released: July 1973
- Label: Bell
- Songwriter(s): Stephens-Cook-Greenaway
- Producer(s): Billy Davis, Roger Cook, Roger Greenaway

The Drifters singles chronology
"You've Got Your Troubles" (1973)	"Like Sister and Brother" (1973)	"Kissin' in the Back Row of the Movies" (1974)

"Like Sister and Brother" is a song written and originally recorded by The Drifters in 1973. It was the first of four charting singles released from their Love Games LP. Bill Fredericks is the lead singer.

The song reached the Top 10 in the UK, the first of three to do so. "Like Sister and Brother" also reached the Top 10 in Australia.

== Chart history ==
=== Weekly charts ===
Chart (1973–74)	Peak position
Australia (Kent Music Report)	9
Ireland (IRMA)	14
UK	7

=== Year-end charts ===
Chart (1973)	Rank
Australia (Kent Music Report)	76

Chart (1974)	Rank
Australia (Kent Music Report)	41
