= Fred Burch =

American songwriter

Fred Burch (born 1931/1932) is an American popular songwriter. His hometown was Paducah, Kentucky but he was based in Nashville where he was a staff writer with the Cedarwood Publishing Co.

Burch and fellow songwriter Don Hill also recorded as South for a 1969 single "Barefoot In The Woods" on the Silver Fox label. In 1982 he wrote a musical, American Passion, with Willie Fong Young.

== Selected songs ==
Co-writers' names are in brackets.

- "Dream on Little Dreamer" - Perry Como hit (1965) (Jan Crutchfield)
- "How High's the Watergate, Martha?" - David Allan Coe (Bob Robison)
- "PT-109" - Jimmy Dean hit (1962) (Marijohn Wilkin)
- "Tragedy" - Thomas Wayne hit (1959), Fleetwoods hit (1961), Brenda Lee (on album), Paul McCartney (album bonus track), others (Gerald Nelson)
- "He Made a Woman Out of Me" - Bobbie Gentry, Bettye LaVette (Don Hill)
- "Snakes Crawl at Night" - Charley Pride (Mel Tillis)
- "Sing You Children" - Elvis Presley (Gerald Nelson)
- "The Love Machine" - Elvis Presley (Chuck Taylor, Gerald Nelson)
- "Yoga is as Yoga Does" - Elvis Presley (Gerald Nelson)
- "Atlantic Coastal Line" - Burl Ives, Charley Pride (Mel Tillis)
- "Strange"- Patsy Cline (Mel Tillis)
- "Big Big World" - Johnny Burnette (Red West, Gerald Nelson)
