= I Gotta Get Myself a Woman =

Single by The Drifters

from the album Rockin' & Driftin'
- A-side: "Soldier of Fortune"
- Released: July 1956
- Genre: R&B
- Length: 2:13
- Label: Atlantic; 1101
- Songwriter(s): Jesse Stone

The Drifters singles chronology
"Ruby Baby" (March 31, 1956)	"I Gotta Get Myself a Woman" (1956)	"Fools Fall in Love" (January 11, 1957)

"I Gotta Get Myself a Woman" is a song written by Jesse Stone and performed by The Drifters. In 1956, the track reached No. 11 on the U.S. R&B chart.

It was featured on their 1958 album, Rockin' & Driftin'.
