= Steamboat (The Drifters song) =

Single by The Drifters

from the album Rockin' & Driftin'
- A-side: "Adorable"
- Released: October 1955
- Genre: R&B
- Length: 2:27
- Label: Atlantic; 1078
- Songwriter(s): Buddy Lucas

The Drifters singles chronology
| "What'cha Gonna Do" (February 1955) | "Steamboat" (1955) | "Ruby Baby" (March 31, 1956) |

"Steamboat" is a song written by Buddy Lucas and performed by The Drifters. In 1955, the track reached No. 5 on the U.S. R&B chart.

It was featured on their 1958 album, Rockin' & Driftin'.
