= What'cha Gonna Do (The Drifters song) =

Single by Clyde McPhatter and The Drifters

from the album Clyde McPhatter & The Drifters
- B-side: "Gone"
- Released: February 1955
- Genre: R&B
- Length: 2:42
- Label: Atlantic; 1055
- Songwriter(s): Ahmet Ertegun

Clyde McPhatter and The Drifters singles chronology
"White Christmas" (November 1954)	"What'cha Gonna Do" (1955)	"Adorable"/"Steamboat" (October 1955)

"What'cha Gonna Do" is a song written by Ahmet Ertegun and performed by Clyde McPhatter and The Drifters. In 1955, the track reached No. 2 on the U.S. R&B chart.

It was featured on their 1956 album, Clyde McPhatter & The Drifters.

== Other versions ==
- Rudy Ray Moore released a version of the song as the B-side to his 1962 single "The Ballad of a Boy and a Girl".
