= At the Club (The Drifters song) =

Single by The Drifters

from the album I'll Take You Where the Music's Playing
- B-side: "Answer the Phone"
- Released: January 1965
- Genre: Rhythm and blues
- Length: 2:53
- Label: Atlantic; 2268
- Songwriters: Carole King, Gerry Goffin
- Producer: Bert Berns

The Drifters singles chronology
"The Christmas Song" (1964)	"At the Club" (1965)	"Come On Over to My Place" (1965)

"At the Club" is a song written by Carole King and Gerry Goffin and performed by The Drifters. In 1965, the track reached No. 10 on the U.S. R&B chart, No. 35 on the UK Singles Chart, and No. 43 on the U.S. pop chart.

It was featured on their 1965 album, I'll Take You Where the Music's Playing.
