= Clyde McPhatter =

American singer (1932–1972)

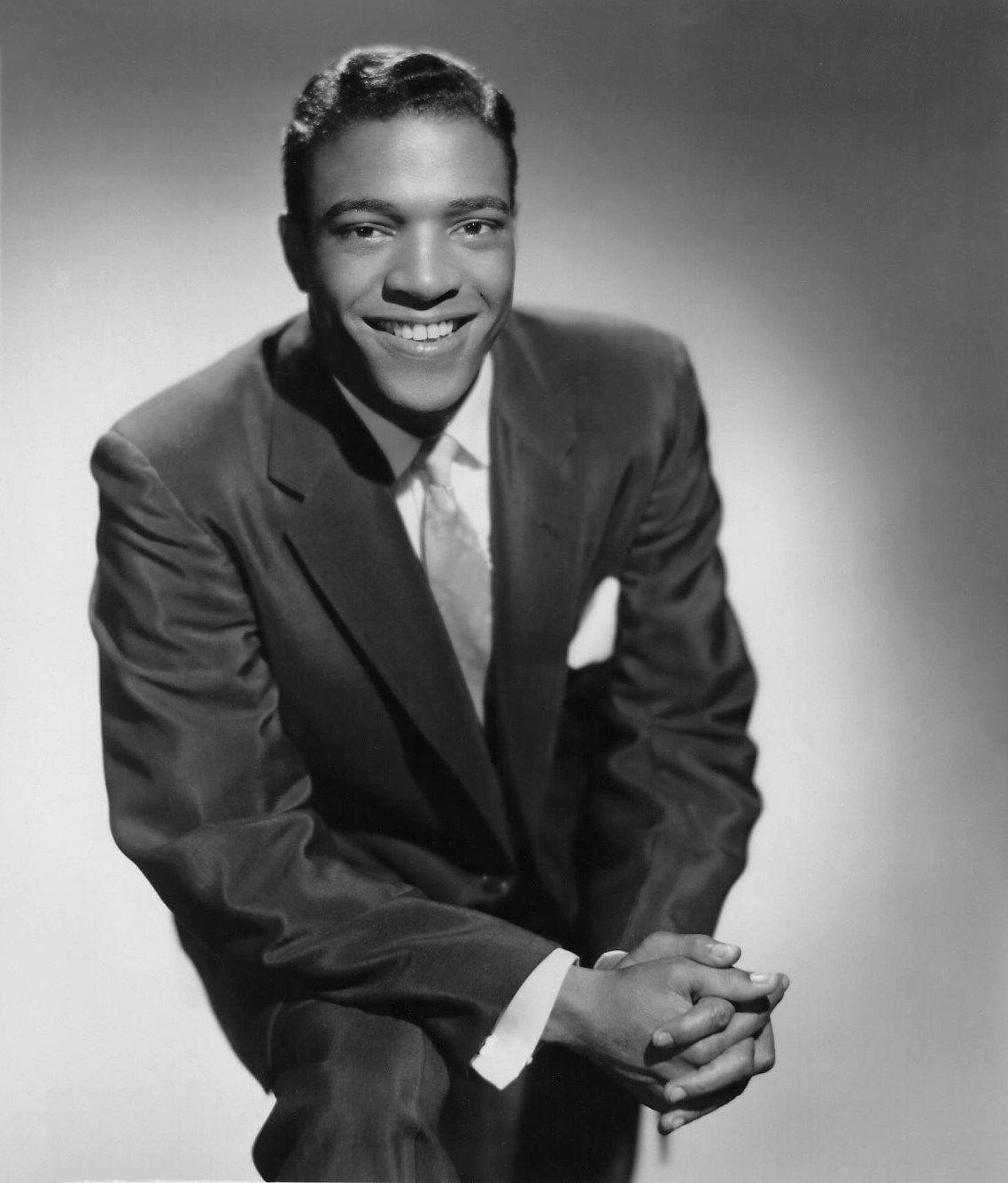
- McPhatter in 1959

Background information
- Born: Clyde Lensley McPhatter; November 15, 1932; Durham, North Carolina, U.S.
- Died: June 13, 1972 (aged 39) Teaneck, New Jersey
- Genres: Rock and roll; rhythm and blues; soul; pop
- Occupation: Singer
- Years active: 1950–1972

Clyde Lensley McPhatter (November 15, 1932 – June 13, 1972) was an American rhythm and blues, soul, and rock and roll singer. He was one of the most widely imitated R&B singers of the 1950s and early 1960s and was a key figure in the shaping of doo-wop and R&B.

McPhatter's high-pitched tenor voice was steeped in the gospel music he sang much of his early life. He was the lead tenor of the Mount Lebanon Singers, a gospel group he formed as a teenager. He was later the lead tenor of Billy Ward and his Dominoes and was largely responsible for the initial success of the group. After his tenure with the Dominoes, McPhatter formed his own group, the Drifters, and later worked as a solo performer. He was 39 when he died, had been alcoholic and depressed for years, and was, according to Jay Warner's On This Day in Music History, "broke and despondent over a mismanaged career that made him a legend but hardly a success".

McPhatter left a legacy of over 22 years of recordings. He was the first artist to be inducted twice into the Rock and Roll Hall of Fame, first as a solo artist and later as a member of the Drifters. Subsequent double and triple inductees into the Rock and Roll Hall of Fame are said to be members of the "Clyde McPhatter Club".

== Life and career ==
=== Early life ===
McPhatter was born in the community of Hayti, in Durham, North Carolina on November 15, although the year is disputed. Some sources cite 1932. Author Colin Escott cites 1931, stating, "most biographies quote 1933 or 1934, although government documents cite the earlier year". His grave marker cites his birth year as 1932.

He was raised in a Baptist family, the son of Rev. George McPhatter and his wife Beulah (some accounts refer to her as Eva). Starting at the age of five, he sang in his father's church gospel choir along with his three brothers and three sisters. When he was 10, Clyde was the soprano-voiced soloist for the choir.

In 1945, Rev. McPhatter moved his family to Teaneck, New Jersey, where Clyde attended Chelsior High School. He worked part-time as a grocery store clerk and was promoted to shift manager upon graduating high school. The family then relocated to New York City, where Clyde formed a gospel group, the Mount Lebanon Singers.

=== With Billy Ward and the Dominoes (1950–1953) ===
In 1950, after winning the coveted Amateur Night at Harlem's Apollo Theater contest, McPhatter returned to his job as a store manager. He was discovered singing in the choir in the Holiness Baptist Church of New York City by Billy Ward of Billy Ward and his Dominoes and was recruited into the group. He was present for the recording of "Sixty Minute Man" for Federal Records, produced by Ralph Bass.

Billy Ward and his Dominoes was one of the top R&B vocal groups in the country, garnering more popularity than the Clovers, the Ravens, and the Five Keys, largely due to McPhatter's fervent, high-pitched tenor. In his book The Drifters, Bill Millar named Ben E. King, Smokey Robinson of the Miracles, Sammy Turner, and Marv Johnson among the many vocalists who patterned themselves after McPhatter. "Most important," he concluded, "McPhatter took hold of the Ink Spots' simple major chord harmonies, drenched them in call-and-response patterns, and sang as if he were back in church. In doing so, he created a revolutionary musical style from which—thankfully—popular music will never recover."

After recording several more songs with the Dominoes, including "Have Mercy Baby", "Do Something for Me", and "The Bells", McPhatter left the Dominoes on May 7, 1953. He was sometimes passed off as "Clyde Ward, Billy's little brother". Others assumed Billy Ward was doing the lead singing. As a member of the Dominoes, McPhatter did not earn much money; Ward paid him $100 a week, minus deductions for food, taxes, motel bills, etc. In an interview in 1971, McPhatter told journalist Marcia Vance, "whenever I'd get back on the block where everybody'd heard my records—half the time I couldn't afford a Coca-Cola."

Due to such occurrences, and as he was frequently at odds with Ward, McPhatter decided he would quit the Dominoes, intent on making a name for himself. He announced his intent to quit the group, and Ward agreed to his leaving provided that McPhatter stayed long enough to coach a replacement. Auditions for a replacement were later held at Detroit's Fox Theater, and a young Jackie Wilson eventually took over as lead tenor for the Dominoes. The position influenced Wilson's singing style and stage presence. "I fell in love with the man's voice. I toured with the group and watched Clyde and listened ..."—and apparently learned.

Privately, McPhatter and Ward often argued, but publicly McPhatter expressed his appreciation of Ward for giving him his start in entertainment. "I think Billy Ward is a very wonderful musician and entertainer. I appreciate all he did for me in giving me my start in show business."

=== The Drifters (1953–1954) ===
Ahmet Ertegun, founder of Atlantic Records, and Jerry Wexler, eagerly sought McPhatter after noticing he was not present for an appearance by the Dominoes at Birdland, which was "an odd booking for the Dominoes", in Ertegun's words.

After locating him, McPhatter was signed to Atlantic on the condition that he form his own group. McPhatter promptly assembled a group and called them the Drifters. They recorded a few tracks in June 1953, including a song called "Lucille", written by McPhatter himself. This group of Drifters did not have the sound Atlantic executives were looking for, however, and Clyde was prompted to assemble another group of singers. The initial members of the Drifters McPhatter assembled were mostly members of the Mount Lebanon Singers.

The revised lineup recorded and released such hits as "Money Honey", "Such a Night", "Honey Love", "White Christmas", and "What'cha Gonna Do", with the record label displaying the group name "Clyde McPhatter and the Drifters" on the first two singles, later changed to "The Drifters featuring Clyde McPhatter".

In late 1954, McPhatter was inducted into the U.S. Army and assigned to Special Services in the continental United States, which allowed him to continue recording. After his tour of duty, he left the Drifters and launched a solo career. The Drifters continued as a successful group, but with many changes in personnel, and the group assembled by McPhatter was long gone by the time their greatest successes were released after he left the group.

Upon his departure from the Drifters, McPhatter sold his share of the group to the band's manager George Treadwell, a decision that he later came to regret, after realizing that he caused his fellow musicians to experience unprofitability and the group essentially became a revolving-door line-up with recycled members on a ridiculous $100 weekly salary and paid virtually no royalties.

=== Solo career ===
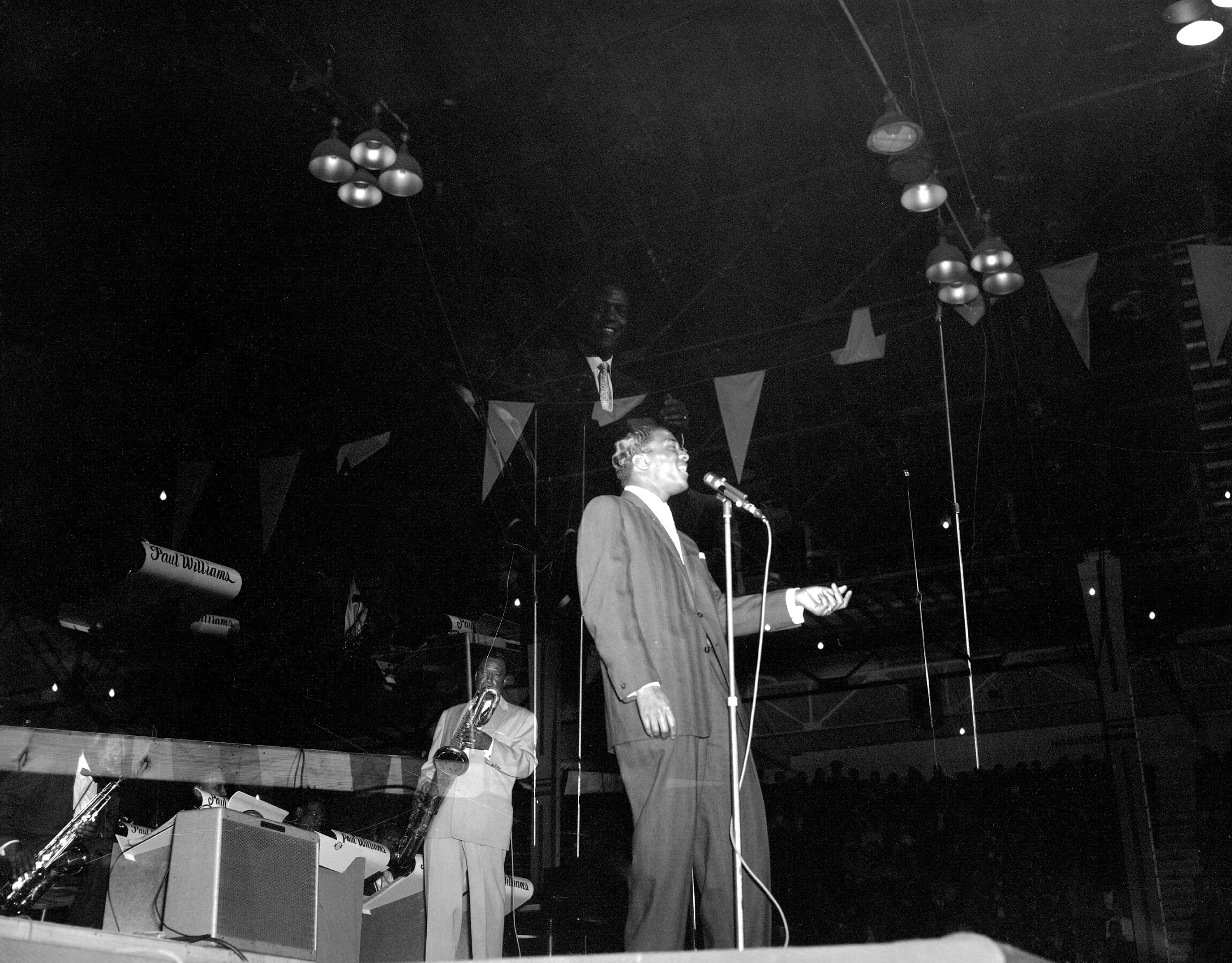
McPhatter performing in 1957

Just after his military discharge, McPhatter recorded his first solo hit, "Love Has Joined Us Together", with Ruth Brown. He released several R&B recordings in the next few years, including "Rock and Cry", "Seven Days" (later a bigger hit for Tom Jones), "Treasure of Love", "Let Me Know", "Just to Hold My Hand", and his biggest solo hit, "A Lover's Question", written by Brook Benton and Jimmy T. Williams, which peaked at number six in 1958.

McPhatter's 1956 recording "Treasure of Love" was his first number-one hit on the R&B charts as a solo artist, and spent one week in the UK Singles Chart. It reached number 16 on the U.S. pop charts, sold over two million copies in the United States alone, and was awarded a gold disc by the Recording Industry Association of America.

During that period McPhatter toured the United States as part of promoter Irvin Feld's "Biggest Star of 1956." Prior to his ownership of Ringling Bros. and Barnum & Bailey, Feld's integrated music tours included both Black and White singers on the same stage, including Bill Haley and the Comets, Bo Diddley, The Platters, and The Drifters.

After leaving Atlantic Records, McPhatter signed with MGM Records and released several more songs, including "I Told Myself a Lie" and "Think Me a Kiss" (1960), and his first single for Mercury Records, "Ta Ta". His tenure on these labels proved to be less fruitful than his time with Atlantic. He moved to other record labels and recorded more singles, including "I Never Knew" and his final top-10 hit, "Lover Please", written by country artist Billy Swan, which made it to number seven in 1962. After "Lover Please", McPhatter's career took a downward turn, as musical styles and tastes were constantly changing during the 1960s. He managed a top 30 R&B hit, "Crying Won't Help You Now", in 1964, then fell off the charts. McPhatter turned to alcohol abuse, sporadically releasing recordings that failed to chart.

In 1968, McPhatter moved to England, where he still had something of a following, using the UK band ICE as backup.

== Activism ==
McPhatter was active in the civil rights movement as early as the 1950s. He supported the efforts of the Atlanta Student Movement to desegregate public establishments In July 1960, which led to more than 200 students sitting-in at segregated restaurants across downtown Atlanta.

In July of 1960, McPhatter spoke at an NAACP (National Association for the Advancement of Colored People) convention. McPhatter addressed young NAACP leaders, saying, "The NAACP is proud of the yound people who, rather than continue to endure the humiliation of Jim Crow, are willing to risk verbal abuse, physical assault, expulsion from school and imprisonment in Dixie Dungeons." He also applauded white civil rights activits and "white students, who, rejecting prejudice, stood shoulder to shoulder with Afro-American youth in this irresistible crusade."

In May of 1961, McPhatter and Sam Cooke were traveling for their Henry Wynn Supersonic Tour. After arriving in Memphis, Tennessee, McPhatter and Cooke went to check in at the Lorraine Motel, where a telegram from the NAACP was waiting for McPhatter. The telegram cautioned them about performing at the Ellis Auditorium, due to the venue's enforcement of racial segregation. According to the telegram, Black attendees were limited to corners of the top three balconies. In response to the NAACP's call to action, McPhatter and Cooke protested the Jim Crow law, canceling their performance. Aretha Franklin and the Olympics, who were almost on the tour, joined the protest and refused to perform there as well.

== Death ==
McPhatter returned to the U.S. in 1970, making a few appearances in rock-and-roll revival tours, but lived mostly as a recluse. Hopes for a major comeback with a Decca album were crushed on June 13, 1972, when he died in his sleep at the age of 39, of complications of heart, liver, and kidney disease, brought on by alcohol abuse – behavior fueled by a failed career and resentment he harbored towards the fans he felt deserted him. In his interview with journalist Marcia Vance, McPhatter said, "I have no fans."

McPhatter was a resident of Teaneck, New Jersey, at the time of his death. He was buried at George Washington Memorial Park in Paramus, New Jersey. At the time of his death, Clyde McPhatter had one daughter, Deborah L. McPhatter, born in April 1953. Ruth Brown acknowledged in her later years that McPhatter was the father of her son Ronald, born in 1954. Ron now tours with his own group named after his father – Clyde McPhatter's Drifters.

== Legacy and honors ==
- In 1987, McPhatter was posthumously inducted into the Rock and Roll Hall of Fame.
- The Rockabilly Hall of Fame recognized his pioneering efforts.
- The Original Drifters were inducted into the Vocal Group Hall of Fame in 1998.
- The United States Postal Service issued a stamp in McPhatter's honor in 1993.
- The song "Money Honey" (1953) was inducted into the Grammy Hall of Fame in 1999.
- McPhatter was inducted into the North Carolina Music Hall of Fame in 2009.
- In October 2020, Clyde McPhatter's exhibit opened in the North Carolina Museum of History, named "The Beach Music Exhibit". This exhibit was completed with interviews and memorabilia supplied by his daughter Deborah, board chair of the North Carolina Music Hall of Fame.
- In 2023, Rolling Stone ranked McPhatter at number 99 on its list of the 200 Greatest Singers of All Time.

== Singles ==
Titles (A-side, B-side) (both tracks are from the same album except where indicated)	Peak Billboard Pop position	Peak Billboard R&B position	Year	Label	Album
"Money Honey" b/w "The Way I Feel" (non-album track)	—	1	1953	Atlantic	Clyde McPhatter & The Drifters
"Such a Night" b/w "Lucille" (non-album track)	—	2	1954	Atlantic	Clyde McPhatter & The Drifters
"Honey Love" b/w "Warm Your Heart"	21	1	1954	Atlantic	Clyde McPhatter & The Drifters
"Someday (You'll Want Me to Want You)" b/w "Bip Bam" (non-album track)	—	—	1954	Atlantic	Clyde McPhatter & The Drifters
"White Christmas" b/w "The Bells of St. Mary's"	80	2	1954	Atlantic	Clyde McPhatter & The Drifters
The preceding titles are credited to Clyde McPhatter and the Drifters.
"Love Has Joined Us Together" b/w "I Gotta Have You" (both tracks with Ruth Brown)	—	8	1955	Atlantic	Love Ballads
"Seven Days" b/w "I'm Not Worthy"	44	2	1956	Atlantic	Clyde McPhatter & The Drifters
"Treasure of Love" b/w "When You're Sincere" (from Love Ballads)	16	1	1956	Atlantic	Clyde McPhatter & The Drifters
"Thirty Days" b/w "I'm Lonely Tonight" (from Clyde)	—	—	1956	Atlantic	Clyde McPhatter & The Drifters
"Without Love (There Is Nothing)" b/w "I Make Believe"	19	4	1957	Atlantic	Clyde McPhatter & The Drifters
"Just To Hold My Hand" b/w "No Matter What"	26	6	1957	Atlantic	Love Ballads
"Long Lonely Nights" b/w "Heartaches"	49	1	1957	Atlantic	Love Ballads
"Rock and Cry" b/w "You'll Be There"	93	—	1957	Atlantic	Love Ballads
"That's Enough for Me" b/w "No Love Like Her Love"	—	—	1958	Atlantic	Love Ballads
"Come What May" b/w "Let Me Know" (from Clyde)	43	3	1958	Atlantic	Love Ballads
"A Lover's Question" b/w "I Can't Stand Up Alone"	6	1	1958	Atlantic	Clyde
"Lovey Dovey" b/w "My Island of Dreams"	49	12	1959	Atlantic	Clyde
"Since You've Been Gone" b/w "Try Try Baby"	39	14	1959	Atlantic	Clyde
"You Went Back on Your Word" b/w "There You Go"	72	13	1959	Atlantic	Non-album tracks
"I Told Myself a Lie" b/w "(I'm Afraid) The Masquerade Is Over"	70	—	1959	MGM	Clyde McPhatter's Greatest Hits
"Twice As Nice" b/w "Where Did I Make My Mistake"	91	—	1959	MGM	
"Let's Try Again" b/w "Bless You" (from Let's Start Over Again)	48	13	1959	MGM	
"Think Me a Kiss" b/w "When the Right Time Comes Along"	66	—	1960	MGM	
"This Is Not Goodbye" b/w "One Right After Another"	—	—	1960	MGM	
"Just Give Me a Ring" b/w "Don't Dog Me"	96	—	1960	Atlantic	Non-album tracks
"Deep Sea Ball" b/w "Let the Boogie-Woogie Roll"	—	—	1960	Atlantic	Non-album tracks
"If I Didn't Love You Like I Do" b/w "Go! Yes Go!	—	—	1960	Atlantic	Non-album tracks
"Ta Ta" b/w "I Ain't Givin' Up Nothin'"	23	7	1960	Mercury	Ta Ta!
"I Just Want to Love You" b/w "You're for Me"	—	—	1960	Mercury	Non-album tracks
"One More Chance" b/w "Before I Fall in Love Again"	—	—	1960	Mercury	Non-album tracks
"Tomorrow Is a-Comin'" /	103	—	1961	Mercury	Non-album tracks
"I'll Love You Til the Cows Come Home"	110	—	1961	Mercury	Non-album tracks
"The Glory of Love" b/w "Take a Step" (from Clyde McPhatter's Greatest Hits)	—	—	1961	MGM	Let's Start Over Again
"A Whole Heap of Love" b/w "You're Movin' Me"	—	—	1961	Mercury	Non-album tracks
"I Never Knew" b/w "Happiness"	56	17	1961	Mercury	Non-album tracks
"Same Time Same Place" b/w "Your Second Choice"	—	—	1961	Mercury	Non-album tracks
"Lover Please" b/w "Let's Forget About the Past" (non-album track)	7	-	1962	Mercury	Lover Please!
"Little Bitty Pretty One" b/w "Next to Me"	25	—	1962	Mercury	Lover Please!
"Maybe" b/w "I Do Believe"	—	—	1962	Mercury	Rhythm and Soul
"The Best Man Cried" b/w "Stop"	118	—	1962	Mercury	Rhythm and Soul
"From One to One" b/w "So Close to Being in Love"	127	—	1963	Mercury	Non-album tracks
"Deep in the Heart of Harlem" b/w "Happy Good Times" (non-album track)	90	10	1963	Mercury	Songs of the Big City
"Second Window, Second Floor" b/w "In My Tenement"	—	—	1964	Mercury	Songs of the Big City
"Baby Baby" b/w "Lucille"	—	—	1964	Mercury	Non-album tracks
"Crying Won't Help You Now" b/w "I Found My Love"	117	22	1965	Mercury	Non-album tracks
"Everybody's Somebody's Fool" b/w "I Belong to You"	—	—	1965	Amy	Non-album tracks
"Little Bit of Sunshine" b/w "Everybody Loves a Good Time"	—	—	1966	Amy	Non-album tracks
"A Shot of Rhythm and Blues" b/w "I'm Not Going to Work Today"	—	—	1966	Amy	Non-album tracks
"Sweet and Innocent" b/w "Lavender Lace"	—	—	1967	Amy	Non-album tracks
"I Dreamt I Died" b/w "Lonely People Can't Afford to Cry"	—	—	1967	Amy	Non-album tracks
"Thank You Love" b/w "Only a Fool"	—	—	1968	Deram	Non-album tracks
"Baby You Got It" b/w "Baby I Could Be So Good At Loving You"	—	—	1969	Deram	Non-album tracks
"Denver" b/w "Tell Me"	—	—	1969	B & C	Non-album tracks
"I'll Belong to You" b/w "Book of Memories"	—	—	1970	Decca	Welcome Home
"Why Can't We Get Together" b/w "Mixed Up Cup"	—	—	1970	Decca	Welcome Home

=== Billboard Year-End performances ===
Year	Song	Year-End Position
1959	"A Lover's Question"	72
1962	"Lover Please"	41
