= Such a Night =

1953 popular song

Single by Elvis Presley

from the album Elvis Is Back!
- B-side: "Never Ending"
- Released: 5 April 1960 (Elvis Is Back! album); 14 July 1964 (single)
- Recorded: April 3, 1960
- Studio: RCA Studio B, Nashville
- Genre: Rock and roll
- Length: 2:58
- Label: RCA Victor
- Songwriter: Lincoln Chase

Elvis Presley singles chronology
"Viva Las Vegas" (1964)	"Such a Night" (1960)	"Ain't That Lovin' You, Baby" (1964)

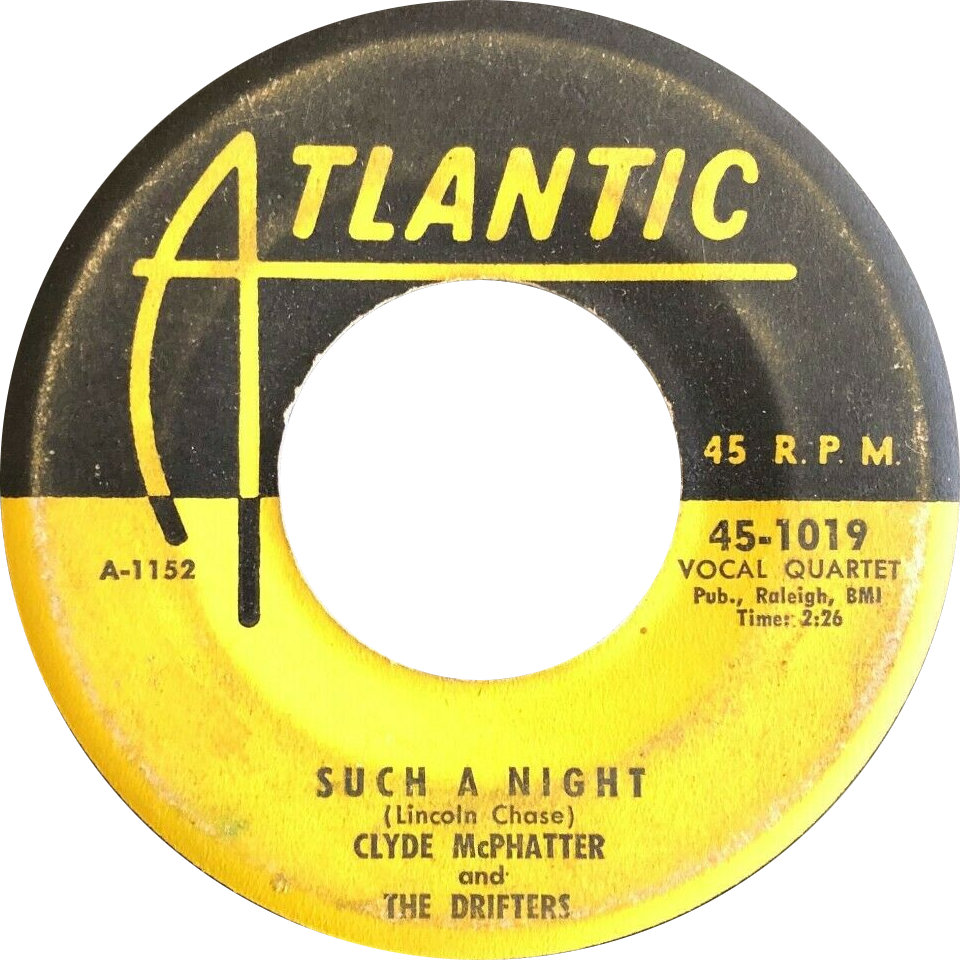
US release of Clyde McPhatter and The Drifters recording

"Such a Night" is a popular song from 1953, written by Lincoln Chase and originally recorded by the Drifters. The Drifters featuring Clyde McPhatter recorded the song in November 1953, and Atlantic Records released it in January 1954 as the intended B-side of the McPhatter-penned "Lucille", which was recorded by an earlier version of the group. Despite being banned by some radio stations as too "racy", it reached number 2 on the US Billboard charts in 1954.

== Other versions ==
- The song also became a hit single for Johnnie Ray, whose cover version reached No. 1 in the UK Singles Chart in 1954. Ray's version entered the US Cash Box chart on 27 March 1954, peaking at No. 18 two weeks later on 10 April.
- Elvis Presley also recorded the song and released it on his 1960 RCA Victor album Elvis Is Back!. Presley's version made number 13 in the UK and number 16 in the US, when released as a single in 1964.
- Flemish singer Eric De Clerk took the artist name 'Ricky Gordon', performed Dutch schlager songs, but changed to rock and roll in 1974, and "Such A Night" became his first hit: a Top 10 hit in both Flanders and the Netherlands.
