= The Drifters =

American pop and R&B/soul vocal group

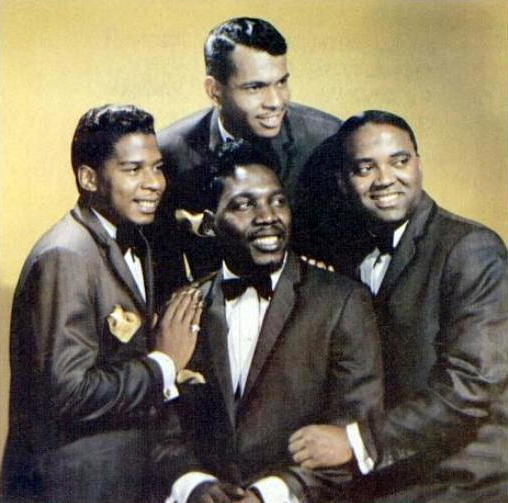
- The Drifters in 1964; Clockwise, left to right: Eugene Pearson, Johnny Terry, Charlie Thomas, and Johnny Moore

Background information
- Origin: New York City, US
- Genres: R&B; doo-wop; soul; pop
- Years active: 1953–present
- Labels: Atlantic, Bell, Neon
- Members: Louis Bailey; Stephen Brown; Jerome Manning; Jeff Hall
- Past members: Clyde McPhatter; Gerhart Thrasher; Andrew Thrasher; Bill Pinkney; Willie Ferbee; Walter Adams; Ben E. King; Charlie Thomas; Doc Green; Derek Ventura; Bernard Jones; Lloyd Butch Phillips; Elsbeary Hobbs; Rudy Lewis; Tommy Evans; Johnny Lee Williams; Eugene Pearson; Johnny Terry; Harrell Dixon; J.T. Carter; Johnny Stewart; Johnny Moore; Bobby Hendricks; Butch Leake; Rudy Ivan; Jimmy Lewis; Ray Lewis; Rick Sheppard; Bill Fredericks; Louis Price; Maurice Cannon; Glenn Dodd; Michael Williams; Jason Leigh; Phil Watson; Michael Raysor; Dave Revels; Darryl Johnson; Victoria Collins
- Website: thedrifters.co.uk

The Drifters are an American pop and R&B/soul vocal group. They were originally formed as a backing group for Clyde McPhatter, formerly the lead tenor of Billy Ward and his Dominoes in 1953. The second group of Drifters, formed in 1959 and led by Ben E. King, were originally an up-and-coming group named the Five Crowns. After 1965, members moved between both groups, and many of these formed other groups of Drifters as well. Over the succeeding decades, several different bands, all called the Drifters, can trace roots back to these original groups, but contain few—if any—original members.

According to Rolling Stone, the Drifters were the least stable of the great vocal groups, as they were low-paid musicians hired by George Treadwell, who owned the Drifters' name from 1955, after McPhatter left. The Treadwell Drifters line has had 60 musicians, including several splinter groups by former Drifters members (not under Treadwell's management). These groups are usually identified with a possessive credit such as "Bill Pinkney's Original Drifters" and "Charlie Thomas' Drifters".

The three golden eras of the Drifters were the early 1950s, the 1960s, and the early 1970s (post-Atlantic period). From these, the first Drifters, formed by Clyde McPhatter, were inducted into the Vocal Group Hall of Fame as "The Drifters". The second Drifters, featuring Ben E. King, were separately inducted into the Vocal Group Hall of Fame as "Ben E. King and the Drifters". In their induction, the Rock and Roll Hall of Fame selected four members from the first Drifters (Clyde McPhatter, Bill Pinkney, Gerhart Thrasher and Johnny Moore), two from the second Drifters (Ben E. King and Charlie Thomas), and one from the post-Atlantic Drifters (Rudy Lewis). There were other lead singers too, but the group was less successful during those times.

According to the Vocal Group Hall of Fame: "Through turmoil and changes, the (original) Drifters managed to set musical trends and give the public 13 chart hits, most of which are legendary recordings today." Matching that feat, subsequent formations of the Drifters recorded 13 Billboard Hot 100 top-30 chart hits. The 1950s and '60s incarnations of the group were also a force on the US R&B charts, notching six number-one R&B hits: "Money Honey" (1953), "Honey Love" (1954), "Adorable" (1955), "There Goes My Baby" (1959), "Save the Last Dance for Me" (1960), and "Under the Boardwalk" (1964). A 1970s revival in Britain, with both old and new material, was not matched in the United States, although they had their biggest successes on the UK singles chart, peaking with the number-two hit "Kissin' in the Back Row of the Movies".

== History ==
=== Classic first Drifters and Clyde McPhatter ===
To many historians and fans, "The Drifters" means Clyde McPhatter, although he was with the group for only one year. McPhatter was lead tenor for Billy Ward and His Dominoes for three years, starting in 1950. McPhatter's high-pitched tenor was mostly responsible for the Dominoes' success. In 1953, Ahmet Ertegun of Atlantic Records attended a Dominoes performance at Birdland, and noticed McPhatter was absent. Jerry Wexler recalled,

Ahmet exited Birdland like a shot and headed directly uptown. He raced from bar to bar looking for Clyde and finally found him in a furnished room. That very night, Ahmet reached an agreement with McPhatter under which Clyde would assemble a group of his own. They became known as the Drifters.

Wanting to blend gospel and secular sounds, McPhatter's first effort was to get members of his church group, the Mount Lebanon Singers: William "Chick" Anderson, Charlie White, and David "Little Dave" Baughan (tenors); David Baldwin (baritone, and author James Baldwin's brother); and James "Wrinkle" Johnson (bass). After a recording session of four songs on June 29, 1953, Ertegun realized that this combination did not work, and had McPhatter recruit another lineup. The second group included first tenor Bill Pinkney (of the Jerusalem Stars), second tenor Andrew Thrasher, and baritone Gerhart Thrasher (both of the gospel group "The Thrasher Wonders"), Willie Ferbee as bass vocal, and Walter Adams on guitar.

This is the group on the second session that produced their first major hit, "Money Honey", released September 1953, with the record label displaying the group name "Clyde McPhatter and the Drifters". McPhatter was barely known during his time with the Dominoes, and he was sometimes passed off as "Clyde Ward, Billy's little brother". In other instances, people assumed Billy Ward was doing the singing.

"Lucille", written by McPhatter, from the first recording session, was put on the B-side of "Money Honey", making a recording industry rarity; a single released with two songs by two essentially different groups of the same name. "Money Honey" was a huge success, and propelled the Drifters to immediate fame.

More lineup changes followed after Ferbee was involved in an accident and left the group. After Adams died, he was replaced by Jimmy Oliver. Ferbee was not replaced; instead, the voice parts were shifted around. Gerhart Thrasher moved up to first tenor, Andrew Thrasher shifted down to baritone, and Bill Pinkney dropped to bass. This group released several more hits, including "Such a Night" in November 1953, "Honey Love" June 1954, "Bip Bam" October 1954, "White Christmas" November 1954, and "What'cha Gonna Do" in February 1955. McPhatter received his draft letter in March 1954, but as he was initially stationed in Buffalo, New York, he was able to continue with the group for a time. "What'cha Gonna Do", recorded a year before its release, was McPhatter's last official record as a member of the Drifters, although his first solo release ("Everyone's Laughing" b/w "Hot Ziggety") was from his final Drifters session in October 1954. After completing his military service, McPhatter pursued a successful but relatively short-lived solo career with 16 R&B and 21 pop hits.

McPhatter demanded a large share of the group's profits, which he had been denied in the Dominoes; on his departure, though, he did not ensure that this would continue for his successor. He sold his share of the group to George Treadwell, manager, former jazz trumpeter, and husband of singer Sarah Vaughan. As a result, the Drifters recycled many members, none of whom made much money and got paid a mere $100 a week (US$1,202 in 2025 dollars). McPhatter later expressed regret at this action, recognizing that it doomed his fellow musicians to unprofitability.

McPhatter was first replaced by original member David Baughan, who had been singing lead in concert while McPhatter was in the service. Baughan's voice was similar to McPhatter's, but his erratic behavior made him difficult to work with and unsuitable in the eyes of Atlantic Records executives. Baughan soon left the group to form the Harps (1955) (finding his way back into Bill Pinkney's Original Drifters in 1958), and was replaced by Johnny Moore (formerly of The Hornets). During September 1955, this lineup recorded an R&B hit with the A-side "Adorable" reaching number one and the B-side "Steamboat" going to number five. These were followed by "Ruby Baby" in February 1956, and "I Gotta Get Myself a Woman".

Low salaries contributed to burnout among the members. Bill Pinkney was fired after asking Treadwell for more money. In protest, Andrew Thrasher left, as well. Pinkney formed The Flyers with lead singer Bobby Hendricks, who would leave to join the Drifters the next year. Pinkney was replaced by Tommy Evans (who had replaced Jimmy Ricks in the Ravens). Charlie Hughes, a baritone, replaced Andrew Thrasher. Moore, Evans, Gerhart Thrasher, and Charlie Hughes got a top-10 hit in 1957 with "Fools Fall in Love" (number 69 Pop and number 10 R&B).

Moore and Hughes were drafted in 1957 and replaced by Bobby Hendricks and Jimmy Milner. By early 1958, the lineup was Bobby Hendricks (lead tenor), Gerhart Thrasher (first tenor), Jimmy Milner (baritone), Tommy Evans (bass), and Jimmy Oliver (guitar). This lineup had one moderate hit, "Drip Drop" (number 58 Pop), released in April 1958.

With declining popularity, the last of the original Drifters were reduced to working the club scene and doing double duty with gigs under the Coasters and the Ravens names. By May 1958, both Hendricks and Oliver had quit, returning only for a week's appearance at the Apollo Theater. During that week, one of the members got into a fight with the master of ceremonies for the Apollo Theatre's Amateur Night, Ralph Cooper. This was considered the last straw for Treadwell, who fired the entire group. After the argument with Cooper, Treadwell hired a group called the Five Crowns and renamed them "The Drifters".

=== Bill Pinkney's Original Drifters ===
Although Treadwell owned the Drifters brand, original members felt they were the real Drifters and were determined to keep the group alive. Bill Pinkney left first. After receiving exclusive and irrevocable ownership of the name/mark "The Original Drifters" in a binding arbitration, he joined with the Thrashers and David Baughan to begin touring as "The Original Drifters". Several original Drifters came in and out of this group over time, as well as other new artists, but these Drifters never replicated the success of the earlier Drifters group.

Baughan left after a short time. Bobby Lee Hollis joined in 1964 and took over the lead spot. Later that year, Andrew Thrasher left and Jimmy Lewis joined the group. Bobby Hendricks returned, making the group a quintet for a short time, before Lewis's departure. Andrew Thrasher returned, replacing Hollis. Hollis and Baughan were periodically with the group through the 1960s. In 1968, the group consisted of Pinkney, Gerhart Thrasher, Hollis, and Hendricks.

Pinkney hired the Tears to perform as part of his group on a short tour. The Tears were Benny Andersson, George Wallace, Albert Fortson, and Mark Williams. After the tour, the Tears—without Pinkney—continued to tour as the Original Drifters, but Pinkney successfully sued to stop them from using the name.

Pinkney then added new members Bruce Caesar, Clarence Tex Walker, and Bruce Richardson, but the lineup changed rapidly. In 1979 the group was Pinkney, Andrew Lawyer, Chuck Cockerham, Harriel Jackson, and Tony Cook. Their 1995 album Peace in the Valley, on Blackberry Records, credited vocals to Pinkney, Cockerham, Richard Knight Dunbar, (Vernon Young), and Greg Johnson. They appeared on the 2001 PBS special Doo Wop 51 with Pinkney, Dunbar, Johnson, and Bobby Hendricks. The lineup in the early 2000s was Pinkney, Cockerham, Dunbar, Young, and Ronald Jackson, the son of singer Ruth Brown and Clyde McPhatter.[9] Young died in 2005[10] and Pinkney in 2007.

The present Original Drifters lineup is Russell Henry, Chuck Cockerham, Richard Knight Dunbar, Vernon Taylor, Kingsley O'Brian McIntosh, and Joseph Turner.

=== The New Drifters ===
Treadwell owned the rights to the name "Drifters" and still had a year's worth of bookings for the Apollo when he fired the group. In summer 1958 (or 1959), he approached Lover Patterson, the manager of the Five Crowns featuring lead singer Benjamin Earl Nelson—better known by his stage name of Ben E. King—and arranged for them to become the Drifters. The new line-up consisted of King (lead tenor), Charlie Thomas (tenor), Dock Green (baritone), and Elsbeary Hobbs (bass). James "Poppa" Clark was the fifth "Crown"; he was not included due to an alcohol problem, which Treadwell had considered to be a problem with the first group. The group went out on the road to tour for almost a year. Since this new group had no connection to the previous Drifters, they often played to hostile audiences.

When Atlantic decided to send the new Drifters into the studio, Ertegun and Wexler were too busy to produce the sessions, so they hired Jerry Leiber and Mike Stoller, who had been successful producing the Coasters. With Leiber and Stoller producing, this new lineup—widely considered the "true" golden age of the group—released several singles with King on lead that became chart hits. "There Goes My Baby", the first commercial rock-and-roll recording to include a string orchestra, was a top-10 hit, and number 193 on the Rolling Stone 500 Greatest Songs of All Time. "Dance with Me" followed and then "This Magic Moment" (number 16 on the Billboard Hot 100 in 1960). "Save the Last Dance for Me" reached number one on the U.S. pop charts and number two in the UK. It was followed by "I Count the Tears". This version of the Drifters was inducted into the Vocal Group Hall of Fame in 2000 as Ben E. King and the Drifters. The write-up indicates an award primarily as a tribute to Ben E. King with a nod to his time in the Drifters, only one of five paragraphs being exclusively devoted to the Drifters, although Charlie Thomas was also cited by the Rock and Roll Hall of Fame (and the Vocal Group Hall of Fame's induction of the original Drifters, which technically was only through 1958).

Leiber and Stoller also gave the Drifters first dibs on "Only in America", a song originally written about racism in the United States, with references to seats on the backs of buses and schools attempting to end racial segregation. The lyrics were heavily re-written to appease record label concerns about releasing a song with overt political views, and the Drifters recorded it, but ultimately decided not to allow the song to be released out of disappointment at its original message being altered. (Leiber and Stoller passed "Only in America" along to another group they were producing, Jay and the Americans, who had a hit with it, taking it to number 25.)

With this golden age lasting two years, personnel changes followed. Lover Patterson (the Drifters' road manager) got into an argument with George Treadwell. Since Patterson had King under contract, he refused to let him tour with the group. King was only able to record with the group for about a year. Johnny Lee Williams, who sang lead on "(If You Cry) True Love, True Love", the B-side of "Dance with Me", handled the vocals on tour along with Charlie Thomas. When the group passed through Williams's hometown of Mobile, Alabama, Williams left the group. Williams died on December 19, 2004, at the age of 64.

When King asked Treadwell for a raise and a share of royalties, a request that was not honored, he left and began a successful solo career. Williams left at the same time, and a new lead, Rudy Lewis (of The Clara Ward Singers), was hired. Lewis led the Drifters on hits such as "Some Kind of Wonderful", "Please Stay", "Up on the Roof" (which reached number five on the U.S. pop singles chart and number four on the U.S. R&B singles chart in 1963), and "On Broadway" (which reached number 9 on the U.S. pop singles chart and number seven on the U.S. R&B singles chart in 1963). Lewis was also named in the Rock and Roll Hall of Fame Drifters induction. Ben E. King died on April 30, 2015, at the age of 76.

Hobbs was drafted for military service and replaced by the returning Tommy Evans (from the first group). Green left in 1962 and was replaced by Eugene Pearson (of The Rivileers and the Cleftones). Evans left again in 1963 and was replaced by Johnny Terry, who had been an original member of James Brown's singing group the Famous Flames (and was co-writer of their first hit, "Please, Please, Please"). After his military service and a failed solo career, Johnny Moore returned in 1964, making the group a quintet of Moore, Thomas, Lewis, Pearson, and Terry.

Later that year, the group was scheduled to record "Under the Boardwalk" on May 21, but Rudy Lewis died on the night before the session, and Johnny Moore took over as the sole lead (Lewis and he had been alternating). "Under the Boardwalk" was a top 10 hit in the US, but the pace of the Drifters' chart career slowed after this, with "Saturday Night At The Movies" being the group's last US top 40 hit in 1964. The Drifters released several minor hits between 1964 and 1967 that made the US top 100, but didn't break through beyond that. By mid-1968, their singles were not charting at all, anywhere—and they would never have any kind of pop hit in the US again.

Turnover remained frequent. Terry was replaced in 1966 by Dan Dandridge for a few months, then by William Brent, who had been with Johnny Moore in the Hornets in 1954. Gene Pearson was replaced by Rick Sheppard during the same year. By late 1966, baritone/bass Bill Fredericks had replaced William Brent. Charlie Thomas, the group's last member from the Five Crowns, left in mid-1967 and was replaced by Charles Baskerville, a former member of The Limelites. Baskerville stayed only a short time.

In May 1967, George Treadwell died unexpectedly at age 48. His widow, Faye Treadwell, bought out George Treadwell's partners' ownership stakes in The Drifters and took ownership of the group. In 1972, the Drifters left the Atlantic roster.

=== Post-Atlantic career ===
In 1972, as a by-product of the Northern soul scene, the group had three big chart hits in the UK with reissued material from the mid-1960s: "Saturday Night at the Movies", "At the Club", and "Come On Over to My Place". None were previously hits in the UK (though they had all been hits in the US), and all went top 10.

The Drifters, their career rejuvenated, moved to England and continued with several different vocalists. New material was written and overseen by songwriter/producer (and long-term Drifters fan) Roger Greenaway, usually working in conjunction with other partners. The group issued four albums between 1973 and 1976, and became a major UK chart act, scoring 9 top 40 hits in that same timespan. The hits started with 1973's "Like Sister and Brother" (lead vocal by Fredericks), and included a string of extremely popular numbers sung by Moore, including "Kissin' in the Back Row of the Movies" (a number 2 hit in 1974), "There Goes My First Love" (which hit number. 3), and "You're More Than a Number in My Little Red Book" (which peaked at number 5). In America, only "Kissin' in the Back Row of the Movies" made any chart impression, reaching number 83 on the R&B charts.

The Drifters had their last hit in 1976, "You're More Than a Number in My Little Red Book". While the Drifters kept recording, they never released another chart hit in the UK or the US.

Personnel turnover remained frequent. Butch Leake and Grant Kitchings of the Ink Spots replaced Sheppard and Thomas in 1973. Fredericks was replaced by Clyde Brown during the next year, and Kitchings by Billy Lewis the year after. Leake was replaced by Joe Blunt in 1976, making the lineup Johnny Moore, Clyde Brown, Joe Blunt, and Billy Lewis. Faye Treadwell renamed the group's management company Treadwell Drifters Inc.

Moore left in 1978 and was replaced by Ray Lewis. Blunt and Billy Lewis left in 1979 and were replaced by the returning Johnny Moore and former Temptations lead Louis Price. Moore left again in late 1982, along with Clyde Brown. They were replaced by two returning members, Ben E. King and Bill Fredericks.

Fredericks, Lewis, and Price all left in 1983 and were replaced by the returning Johnny Moore, Joe Blunt, and Clyde Brown. In 1986, the group split up, and a new lineup was constructed by Treadwell, consisting of new member Jonah Ellis and former members Ray Lewis, Billy Lewis, and Louis Price. During the next year, more former members came in as replacements, making the group Moore, Billy and Ray Lewis, and Gene Jenkins (replaced shortly after by George Chandler, then John Thurston). Ray Lewis was out in 1988 and was replaced by Joe Cofie. In 1989, Billy Lewis left and was replaced by the returning George Chandler, then Tony Jackson, Keith John, and Peter Lamarr in 1990.

Thurston was out at the end of the year and was replaced by Roy Hemmings (formerly of J.A.L.N. Band). Patrick Alan was in for Peter Lamarr briefly before Lamarr left in 1991 and was permanently replaced by Rohan Delano Turney. Johnny Stewart joined the group in 1963 and left in 1993 in Las Vegas. He joined the Platters and continued his singing career. This lineup lasted until 1996, when Cofie was out and Jason Leigh was in. Leigh was replaced after two years by the returning Lamarr. Leigh returned on the next tour and Lamarr was replaced by the returning Patrick Alan.

On January 10, 1992, several former Drifters reunited for a one-off concert called "Royalty of Rock: The Ultimate Reunion". This one-off Drifters lineup included Ben E. King, Charlie Thomas, Johnny Moore, and Barry Hobbs. Other acts that performed at the concert included Dion & the Belmonts, Ronnie Spector, and Little Anthony and the Imperials.

On December 30, 1998, the group's longest-serving member, Johnny Moore, died in London. Patrick Alan returned to the group, keeping it a quartet.

In 2001, Faye Treadwell left the United Kingdom and apparently abandoned the Treadwell Drifters franchise, although in January 2000, a US court had overturned a 1999 jury verdict declaring that it was abandoned. Two members of her company, Mark Lundquist and Phil Lunderman, started a new management company, Drifters UK Limited, to run the group. Their new duties included stopping a trademark by a UK group calling themselves American Drifters. Lamarr left again in 2003 and was replaced by Victor Bynoe. Hemmings left in 2004 and was replaced by Peter Lamarr. The group's lineup as of 2007 was Peter Lamarr, Rohan Delano Turney, Patrick Alan, and Victor Bynoe. On June 20, 2007, this lineup performed at Prime Minister Tony Blair's Farewell Party in London. In 2008, Faye Treadwell's daughter, Tina Treadwell, won a case in a UK court establishing her ownership of the Treadwell Drifters franchise, so this lineup lost the right to use the Drifters name.

=== Litigation ===
In 1969, magazine editor Larry Marshak planned a series of concerts by the Drifters and other classic vocal groups. He found Dock Green, Charlie Thomas, and Elsbeary Hobbs, and began to promote them as "the Drifters". This brought swift legal action from Faye Treadwell, wife of George Treadwell, who was managing the Drifters. In an attempt to grant his group the sole rights to the name, Marshak convinced Hobbs, Thomas, and Green to apply for a trademark on the Drifters name in 1976. The trademark was granted, but due to Treadwell's legal action, it was revoked in 2000 in U.S. federal court. The trio of original Drifters split afterward into separate groups. The Truth in Music Advertising laws were legislated in 35 of the 50 US states from 2005 to 2020 to stop promoters such as Marshak from assembling new groups of musicians and marketing them as well-known groups such as the Drifters.

In December 2006, writs were served in the London high court by Tina Treadwell, daughter of George and Faye, against Mark Lundquist and Philip Luderman's Drifters UK Ltd, alleging they are not the rightful controllers of the Drifters.

In July 2008, The Treadwell family and Prism Music Group Ltd won their legal battle. The court order prohibited Phil Luderman, Mark Lundquist, Rohan Delano Turney, Peter Lamarr, Patrick Alan, or Victor Bynoe from using the Drifters name.

Ownership of the Drifters name continues with the Treadwell family in the form of George Treadwell's daughter, Tina, and the UK-based company Prism Music Group Ltd. The line-up features Michael Williams, Pierre Herelle, Ryan King, and Carlton Powell.

The Drifters lineup performed at the London IndigoO2 Arena in 2009 with special guests the Drifter Legends, made up of some of the most prestigious former members of the group. Lifetime achievement awards were presented at this concert to Joe Blunt and Butch Leake by Neil Martin from Sony Music and songwriter Roger Greenway. In 2012, gold discs (100,000 units sold of Up on the Roof, The Very Best Of) were awarded by Sony Music to Butch Leake, Joe Blunt, and Clyde Brown.

This is the only lineup, with the exception of Johnny Moore, to have recorded on both of the group's former labels, having recorded new material on Atlantic/Warner in 2009 and on Sony Music in 2011.

== Splinter groups ==
As stated previously, two well-known Drifters splinter groups were led by Bill Pinckney and Charlie Thomas. However, there have been other Drifters splinter groups.

Dock Green led his group, the Drifters featuring Dock Green, throughout the 1970s and 1980s. That group consisted of Green (lead/baritone), Derek Ventura (lead/tenor), Lloyd Butch Phillips (second tenor), and Bernard Jones (bass/baritone). Green died on March 10, 1989; Phillips died in 2002.

Ray Lewis and Roy Hemmings have led a Drifters group. Bobby Hendricks led a group, as did Billy Lewis. Don Thomas leads a group, Don Thomas and the Drifters Review. In addition, Ronn McPhatter, son of Clyde McPhatter, leads a group called Clyde McPhatter's Drifters.

Aside from the official post-2008 lineup, Treadwell managed a second group, The Drifters Legends, composed of former members Rick Sheppard, Butch Leake, Joe Blunt, and Clyde Brown. Faye Treadwell died of breast cancer at the age of 84 on May 22, 2011.

== Awards ==
The Vocal Group Hall of Fame has inducted both "The Original Drifters" (1998) and "Ben E. King and the Drifters" (2000). In 2004, Rolling Stone ranked the Drifters number 81 on their list of the 100 Greatest Artists of All Time. In 1988, the Rock and Roll Hall of Fame inducted the Drifters; naming members Clyde McPhatter, Bill Pinkney, Gerhart Thrasher, Johnny Moore, Ben E. King, Charlie Thomas, and Rudy Lewis. Bill Pinkney, Charlie Thomas, and Johnny Moore (posthumously) received Pioneer Awards from the Rhythm & Blues Foundation in 1999. The Songwriters Hall of Fame include The Drifters among their Songwriters Friends, the artists who popularized the songs written by inductees. Rhythm & Blues Hall of Fame 2018.

== Soundtracks ==
Even after their golden age in the late 1970s, the Drifters have continued to maintain relevance, which can be seen in 1990s cinema. In the United States, famous tracks like "There Goes My Baby" and "This Magic Moment" were featured in the movie The Sandlot, released in 1993. This familiar 90s classic invites present and future generations to be familiarized with the Drifters. Also, "White Christmas" has made its way into various soundtracks of popular movies in the United States, such as Home Alone, The Santa Clause, and I'll Be Home for Christmas.

== Members ==
=== Current ===
- Ray Lewis (1978–1983, 1986–present)
- Hollywood Lee Logan (1983–Present)
- Vernon K. Taylor (1995–present)
- Michael Williams (2008–present)
- Ryan King (2010–present)
- Damien Charles (2014–present)

=== Former ===
- Clyde McPhatter (1953–1955; died 1972)
- David "Little Dave" Baughan (1953, 1954–1955; died 1970)
- William "Chick" Anderson (1953)
- David Baldwin (1953)
- James "Wrinkle" Johnson (1953; died 2001)
- Bill Pinkney (1953–1956; died 2007)
- Gerhart Thrasher (1953–1958; died 1977)
- Andrew Thrasher (1953–1956; died 1978)
- Willie Ferbee (1953)
- Walter Adams (1953; died 1953)
- Jimmy Oliver (1953–1958)
- Johnny Moore (1954–1957, 1963–1978, 1980, 1983, 1987–1998; died 1998)
- Tommy Evans (1956–1958, 1960–1962; died 1984)
- Charles "Charlie Carnation" Hughes (1956–1958, died 1998)
- Bobby Hendricks (1957–1958; died 2022)
- Jimmy Milner (1957–1958; died 2008)
- Ben E. King (1958–1960, 1981–1985; died 2015)
- Charlie Thomas (1958–1967, 1988–2023; died 2023)
- Dock Green (1958–1962; died 1989)
- Elsbeary "Beary" Hobbs (1958–1960; died 1996)
- James Clark (1958–59)
- Johnny Lee Williams (1959–1960; died 2004)
- Reggie Kimber (1959–1960)
- James Poindexter (1960)
- Rudy Lewis (1960–1964; died 1964)
- Eugene "Gene" Pearson (1962–1966; died 2000)
- John Winford "Johnny" Terry (1963–1965; died 2005)
- Jimmy Lewis (1963–1965; died 2004)
- Dan Dandridge (1966)
- Clarence Tex Walker (1966–1973; died 2007)
- William Brent (1966)
- Rick Sheppard (1966–1967)
- Bill Fredericks (1966–??, 1982–1983; died 1999)
- Charles Baskerville (1967)
- Luddy Samms
- Butch Leake (1970–1976)
- Derek Ventura (1972–1984)
- Bernard Jones (1972–1984)
- Lloyd Butch Phillips (1972–1984; died 2002)
- Billy Lewis (1975–1979, 1986–1989)
- Joe Blunt (1976–1980, 1983–1986)
- Rudy Ivan (19??–1982)
- Louis Price (1980–1983, 1986)
- Peter Lamarr (1990, 1991, 1998–2001, 2004–??)
- Roy Hemmings (1990–2003)
- Rohan Delano Turney (1991–????)
- Patrick Alan (1990, 1998–????)
- Jason Leigh (1995–2001)
- Victor Bynoe (2002–??)
- Steve V. King (2008–2010)
- Maurice Cannon (2008–2011)
- Damion Charles (2008–2012)
- Carlton Powell (2011–2014)
- Pierre Herelle (2012–2014)
- Daniel Bowen-Smith (2014–2016)
- Bobby Charles Taylor (born August 13, 1940 – died on October 14, 2018, in Moreno Valley, California)
- Gil Hamilton aka. Johnny Thunder
- Emmanuel Dadey (2015)
- Jerome Bucknor (2015)
- Lee Anderson (2015)
- Edward Stenlund (2023)

=== Lineups ===
The Atlantic Years 1953–1972 (does not include Bill Pinkney's Original Drifters (1959– ), Charlie Thomas's Drifters (1971– ) or the Drifters in the UK (1972– ) which for many years featured Johnny Moore.); nor does it include the various later Drifters groups that used the name but have no connection with the Treadwell Drifters.

May–June 1953 ('embryonic' group, demo recordings)	July–Oct 1953	Oct 1953 – March 1954	April–Nov 1954
Clyde McPhatter – lead tenor; David "Little Dave" Baughan – 1st tenor; William "Chick" Anderson – 2nd tenor; David Baldwin – baritone; James "Wrinkle" Johnson – bass; Arthur Hamm, Chauncey Westbrook – guitar	Clyde McPhatter – lead tenor; Bill Pinkney – 1st tenor; Andrew Thrasher – 2nd tenor; Gerhart Thrasher – baritone; Willie Ferbee – bass; Walter Adams – guitar	Clyde McPhatter – lead tenor; Gerhart Thrasher – 2nd tenor; Andrew Thrasher – baritone; Bill Pinkney – bass; Jimmy Oliver – guitar	Clyde McPhatter – lead tenor (studio, occasionally live); Gerhart Thrasher – 2nd tenor; Andrew Thrasher – baritone; Bill Pinkney – bass; Jimmy Oliver – guitar; David Baughan – lead tenor (live)
Nov 1954 – March 1955	March–July 1955	July–August 1955	Sept 1955 – August 1956
Clyde McPhatter – lead tenor (studio, occasionally live); Gerhart Thrasher – 2nd tenor; Andrew Thrasher – baritone; Bill Pinkney – bass; Jimmy Oliver – guitar; David Baughan – lead tenor (live); Johnny Moore – alternate lead tenor (live)	Clyde McPhatter – lead tenor (studio, occasionally live); Gerhart Thrasher – 2nd tenor; Andrew Thrasher – baritone; Bill Pinkney – bass; Jimmy Oliver – guitar; David Baughan – lead tenor (live)	David Baughan – lead tenor; Gerhart Thrasher – 2nd tenor; Andrew Thrasher – baritone; Bill Pinkney – bass; Jimmy Oliver – guitar	Johnny Moore – lead tenor; Gerhart Thrasher – 2nd tenor; Andrew Thrasher – baritone; Bill Pinkney – bass; Jimmy Oliver – guitar
August 1956 – mid 1957	Mid 1957 – Oct 1957	Oct–Dec 1957	Jan–March 1958
Johnny Moore – lead tenor; Gerhart Thrasher – 2nd tenor; 'Carnation Charlie' Hughes – baritone; Tommy Evans – bass; Jimmy Oliver – guitar	Johnny Moore – lead tenor; Gerhart Thrasher – 2nd tenor; 'Carnation Charlie' Hughes – baritone; Bill Pinkney – bass; Jimmy Oliver – guitar	Bobby Hendricks – lead tenor; Gerhart Thrasher – 2nd tenor; 'Carnation Charlie' Hughes – baritone; Bill Pinkney – bass; Jimmy Oliver – guitar	Bobby Hendricks – lead tenor; Gerhart Thrasher – 2nd tenor; 'Carnation Charlie' Hughes – baritone; Tommy Evans – bass
March–April 1958	May 1958	May 1958	June 1958 – March 1959 (touring only)
Bobby Hendricks – lead tenor; Gerhart Thrasher – 2nd tenor; Jimmy Milner – baritone; Tommy Evans – bass	Gerhart Thrasher – 2nd tenor; Jimmy Milner – baritone; Tommy Evans – bass	Gerhart Thrasher – 2nd tenor; Jimmy Milner – baritone; Tommy Evans – bass; Stand-ins for Dr. Jive Show: Bobby Hendricks – lead tenor; Jimmy Oliver – guitar	Charlie Thomas – lead tenor; Benny Nelson (Ben E. King) – 2nd tenor; Dock Green – baritone; Elsbeary Hobbs – bass; Reggie Kimber – guitar
March–June 1959	July 1959 – May 1960	Summer 1960	Summer 1960
Ben E. King – lead tenor; Charlie Thomas – 2nd tenor; Dock Green – baritone; Elsbeary Hobbs – bass; ? – guitar	Ben E. King – lead tenor (studio only); Charlie Thomas – 2nd tenor (lead on tour); Johnny Lee Williams – 1st tenor; Dock Green – baritone; Elsbeary Hobbs – bass; Bill Davis aka Abdul Samad – guitar	Charlie Thomas – lead tenor; Johnny Lee Williams – 1st tenor; Dock Green – baritone; Elsbeary Hobbs – bass; Abdul Samad – guitar	Charlie Thomas – lead tenor; James Poindexter – 2nd tenor; Dock Green – baritone; Elsbeary Hobbs – bass; Abdul Samad – guitar
Summer 1960 – Nov 1960	December 1960	January 1961	Feb 1961 – Mid 1962
Charlie Thomas – lead tenor; Rudy Lewis – 2nd tenor; Dock Green – baritone; Elsbeary Hobbs – bass; Abdul Samad – guitar	Charlie Thomas – lead tenor; Rudy Lewis – 2nd tenor; Dock Green – baritone; Constantine Van Dyke – bass; Abdul Samad – guitar	Charlie Thomas – lead tenor; Rudy Lewis – 2nd tenor; Dock Green – baritone; George Grant – bass; Abdul Samad – guitar	Rudy Lewis – lead & tenor; Charlie Thomas – lead & tenor; Dock Green – baritone; Tommy Evans – bass; Abdul Samad – guitar
Mid 1962 – Feb 1963	March 1963	April 1963 – May 1964	May 1964 – Mid 1966
Rudy Lewis – lead & tenor; Charlie Thomas – lead & tenor; Gene Pearson – baritone; Tommy Evans – bass; Abdul Samad – guitar	Rudy Lewis – lead & tenor; Charlie Thomas – lead & tenor; Gene Pearson – baritone; Johnny Terry – bass; Abdul Samad – guitar	Rudy Lewis – lead & 2nd tenor; Johnny Moore – lead & 1st tenor; Charlie Thomas – lead & 2nd tenor; Gene Pearson – baritone; Johnny Terry – bass; Abdul Samad – guitar	Johnny Moore – lead & tenor; Charlie Thomas – lead & tenor; Gene Pearson – baritone; Johnny Terry – bass; Abdul Samad – guitar
Summer/autumn 1966	Autumn 1966 – Nov 1966	Dec 1966 – August 1967	August 1967 – Autumn 1967
Johnny Moore – lead & tenor; Charlie Thomas – lead & tenor; Eddie Bowen – baritone; Dan Dandridge – bass; Abdul Samad – guitar	Johnny Moore – lead tenor; Charlie Thomas – lead & tenor; Rick Sheppard – tenor/baritone; Bill Brent – bass; Abdul Samad – guitar	Johnny Moore – lead & tenor; Charlie Thomas – lead & tenor; Rick Sheppard – tenor/baritone; Bill Fredericks – baritone/bass; Abdul Samad – guitar	Johnny Moore – lead & tenor; Bill Fredericks – lead & baritone/bass; Rick Sheppard – tenor/baritone; Charles Baskerville – tenor; Abdul Samad – guitar
November 1967	Dec 1967 – late 1969	Late 1969 – March 1970	March 1970–? breakaway Drifters
Johnny Moore – lead & tenor; Bill Fredericks – lead & baritone/bass; Rick Sheppard – tenor/baritone; ? – guitar	Johnny Moore – lead tenor; Bill Fredericks – lead baritone; Rick Sheppard – tenor/baritone; Milton Turner – baritone; Butch Mann – guitar	Michael Howard- singer (died 2019); Johnny Moore – lead tenor; Bill Fredericks – lead baritone; Rick Sheppard; Don Thomas; Butch Mann – guitar	Johnny Moore – lead tenor; Rick Sheppard- tenor/baritone; Don Thomas – baritone
1970 breakaway Drifters	Dec 1970? – April 1971	May 1971 – ? 1972	Jan 2023–present
Johnny Moore – lead tenor; Don Thomas – baritone; Butch Leake – second tenor	Johnny Moore – lead tenor; Bill Fredericks – lead baritone; (Butch Leake?) second tenor (live); (Don Thomas?) – baritone (live); (Ronald Quinn) (studio)	Johnny Moore – lead tenor; Bill Fredericks – lead baritone; Butch Leake – second tenor; Grant Kitchings – first tenor baritone; Butch Mann – guitar	Louis Bailey – lead tenor; Stephen Brown – lead baritone; Jerome Manning – second tenor; Jeff Hall – second baritone
