= Charlie Thomas (musician) =

American rhythm and blues singer (1937–2023)

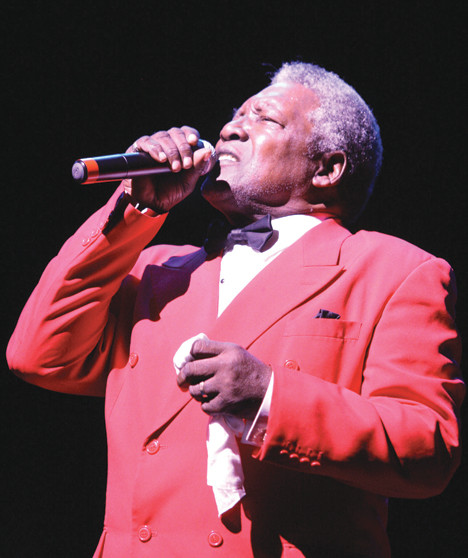
- Thomas performing live

Background information
- Born: Charles Nowlin Thomas; April 7, 1937; Lynchburg, Virginia, U.S.
- Died: January 31, 2023 (aged 85) Bowie, Maryland, U.S.
- Genres: Pop, rock & roll, R&B
- Instrument: Vocals
- Years active: 1957–2023
- Label: Atlantic Records

Charles Nowlin Thomas (April 7, 1937 – January 31, 2023) was an American singer best known for his work with The Drifters. Thomas was performing with The Five Crowns at the Apollo Theater in 1958 when George Treadwell fired his group, called The Drifters. Treadwell recruited the Five Crowns to become the new Drifters.

The new Drifters' first release was the 1959 hit "There Goes My Baby". Charlie was lead singer on two of the group's top 40 hits, "Sweets for My Sweet" and "When My Little Girl Is Smiling".

== Personal life and death ==
Charlie Thomas was the father of Charles "Happy" Thomas Jr. and grandfather of hip hop producer Charlie "Bambu" Thomas.

Thomas died from liver cancer on January 31, 2023, at the age of 85.

== Honors ==
Thomas was inducted into the Rock and Roll Hall of Fame in 1988 as a member of the Drifters and was given a Pioneer Award by the Rhythm and Blues Foundation in 1999. On May 21, 2011, in Cranston, Rhode Island, Thomas and The Drifters performed at the Vintage New England Theater.
