= Fools Fall in Love =

Single by The Drifters
- B-side: "It Was a Tear"
- Released: March 1957
- Genre: R&B
- Label: Atlantic
- Songwriter: Jerry Leiber and Mike Stoller

The Drifters singles chronology
"I Gotta Get Myself a Woman" (July 1956)	"Fools Fall in Love" (1957)	"Drifting Away from You" (May 1957)

"Fools Fall in Love" is a song by Jerry Leiber and Mike Stoller. It was originally recorded by the Drifters, who took it to number 10 on the R&B chart in 1957. The song reached number 69 on the Billboard Hot 100.

== Jacky Ward version ==
In 1977, "Fools Fall in Love" was recorded by Jacky Ward. His version reached number 9 on the US country music chart, and number 16 on the Canadian country chart.

== Other versions ==
- Sammy Turner recorded a version in 1960.
- Elvis Presley recorded a more up-tempo version on May 28, 1966. His rendition, charting in tandem with "Indescribably Blue", reached number 11 in Australia. Elvis's cover also reached number 102 in the U.S. as a separate B-side.
- Two renditions, one upbeat and one torch ballad, were included in the musical revue, Smokey Joe's Cafe, a jukebox musical of songs by Jerry Leiber and Mike Stoller.
- John Pizzarelli recorded an up-tempo jazz version in 1994.
- Ally McBeal featured a ballad version of the song sung by Jennifer Holliday in the second-season episode "Fools Night Out".
