= Easy Come, Easy Go (1967 film) =

1967 music film comedy from the United States directed by John Rich

- Theatrical release poster
- Directed by: John Rich
- Written by: Allan Weiss; Anthony Lawrence
- Produced by: Hal B. Wallis
- Starring: Elvis Presley; Dodie Marshall; Pat Priest; Pat Harrington; Skip Ward; Frank McHugh; Elsa Lanchester
- Cinematography: William Margulies
- Edited by: Archie Marshek
- Music by: Joseph J. Lilley
- Production company: Paramount Pictures
- Distributed by: Paramount Pictures
- Release date: March 22, 1967
- Running time: 95 minutes
- Country: United States
- Language: English
- Budget: $2 million
- Box office: $1.95 million (US/Canada)

Easy Come, Easy Go is a 1967 American musical comedy film starring Elvis Presley. Hal Wallis produced the film for Paramount Pictures, and it was Wallis' final production with Presley. The film co-starred Dodie Marshall, Pat Priest, Pat Harrington, Jr., Skip Ward, Frank McHugh (in his last feature film), and Elsa Lanchester. The movie reached number 50 on the Variety magazine national box office list in 1967.

Easy Come, Easy Go, Presley's 23rd film, was released on March 22, two weeks before his 24th, Double Trouble, which was released on April 5. However, Double Trouble was filmed before Easy Come, Easy Go.

== Plot ==
United States Navy officer Lieutenant (j.g.) Ted Jackson is a former U.S. Navy explosive ordnance disposal officer who divides his time between twin careers as a deep-sea diver and nightclub singer. Ted discovers what he believes could be a fortune in Spanish gold aboard a sunken ship and sets out to rescue it with the help of go-go dancing yoga expert Jo Symington and friend Judd Whitman. Gil Carey, however, is also after the treasure and uses his girlfriend Dina Bishop to foil Ted's plans.

Presley sings six songs in the movie: the title song, "I'll Take Love", "Sing You Children", "You Gotta Stop", "Yoga Is as Yoga Does" in a duet with Elsa Lanchester, and "The Love Machine". The film was the first starring Presley that had a ballad-free soundtrack since his 1956 film debut, Love Me Tender. Despite this, only 30,000 copies were sold, making it the worst-selling record that Elvis ever released for RCA Victor.

== Cast ==
- Elvis Presley as Ted Jackson
- Dodie Marshall as Jo Symington
- Pat Priest as Dina Bishop
- Pat Harrington, Jr. as Judd Whitman
- Skip Ward as Gil Carey
- Sandy Kenyon as Schwartz
- Frank McHugh as Captain Jack
- Ed Griffith as Cooper
- Read Morgan as Ensign Tompkins
- Mickey Elley as Ensign Whitehead
- Elaine Beckett as Vicki
- Shari Nims as Mary
- Diki Lerner as Zoltan
- Robert Isenberg as Artist
- Elsa Lanchester as Madame Neherina
- Mickey Rooney as drunk man
- Russ Tamblyn as yoga student

== Production ==
Paramount originally intended to make a movie called Easy Come Easy Go starring Jan and Dean with director Barry Shear, but it was cancelled when the stars and several crew were injured in a train crash. The studio decided to use the same title, but a completely different plot. Principal photography began on October 3, 1966, and finished about a month later.

== Reception ==
Howard Thompson of The New York Times called the film "a tired little clinker that must have been shot during lunch hour" and also criticized it for only including "three measly songs. A pittance!" Variety was more positive, writing: "Good balance of script and songs, plus generally amusing performances by a competent, well-directed cast, add up to diverting entertainment." Roger Ebert gave the film one star out of four and wrote that it was "obviously produced with a minimum of care and with the sole purpose of contriving a plot, any plot, to fill in between when Elvis sings." Kevin Thomas of the Los Angeles Times wrote that the film was "aptly summed up in its title: easy to take, easy to forget. Always pleasant, occasionally just plain hokey, it sticks to the familiar Presley formula of songs, pretty girls and a slight plot."
