= Roy Hall (American football) =

American football player (born 1983)

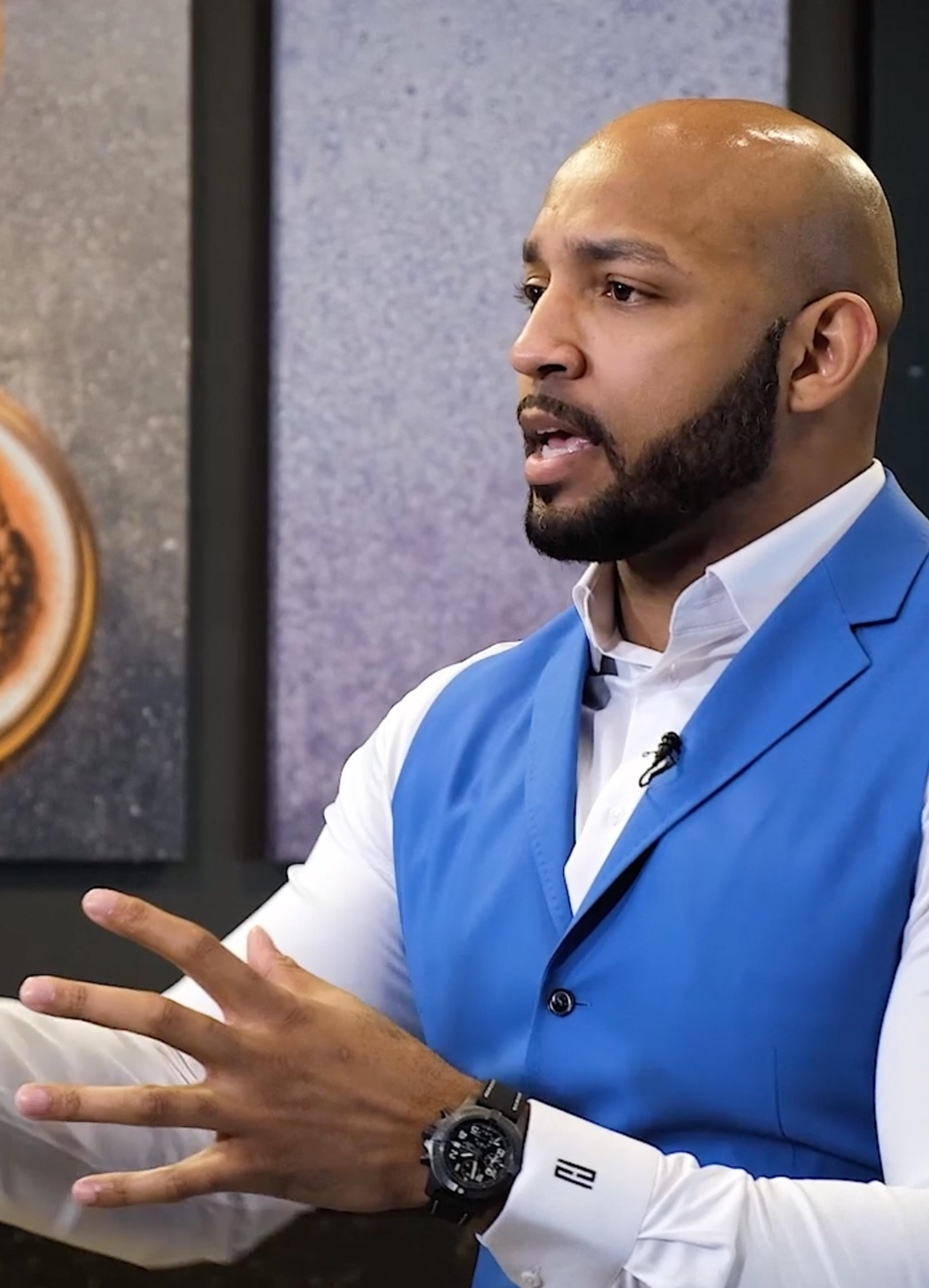
- Hall in 2021

No. 83
- Position: Wide receiver

Personal information
- Born: December 8, 1983 (age 42); South Euclid, Ohio, U.S.
- Listed height: 6 ft 2 in (1.88 m)
- Listed weight: 229 lb (104 kg)

Career information
- High school: Brush (Lyndhurst, Ohio)
- College: Ohio State
- NFL draft: 2007: 5th round, 169th overall pick

Career history
- Indianapolis Colts (2007–2009); New Orleans Saints (2010)*; Omaha Nighthawks (2010); Detroit Lions (2010)*; Omaha Nighthawks (2011)
- * Offseason or practice squad member only

Awards and highlights
- BCS national champion (2002)

Career NFL statistics
- Games played: 7
- Receptions: 1
- Receiving yards: 9
- Stats at Pro Football Reference

Roy Hall (born December 8, 1983) is an American former professional football player who was a wide receiver for the Indianapolis Colts of the National Football League (NFL). He played college football for the Ohio State Buckeyes, completing his college career in the 2007 BCS National Championship Game. He was selected by the Indianapolis Colts in the fifth round of the 2007 NFL draft.

== Early life ==
Hall was born in Cleveland, Ohio. Hall played high school football at Brush High School in Lyndhurst, Ohio. He was a standout student athlete, carrying a 3.8 GPA while honored as a first-team All-Ohio football and basketball star. Hall was nationally ranked in the top-10 high school wide receivers.

== College career ==
Hall was a wide receiver at Ohio State University for the Buckeyes. Hall had six catches for 69 yards his freshman year. He continued to improve during his sophomore season racking up 17 catches for 230 yards. In his junior season he had 16 catches for 134 yards. In his senior season, he ended up with 13 catches for 147 yards. He played in the 2007 BCS National Championship Game. While Hall was not invited to the 2007 NFL combine, had an impressive performance at Pro Day where he ran a 4.32 40-yard dash to get the attention of the Indianapolis Colts.

== Professional career ==
=== Indianapolis Colts ===
Hall started his professional football career with the Colts, drafted in April 2007. In his rookie year, during a week three game against the Houston Texans, Hall was involved in a dangerous special-teams collision with Texans defensive tackle Cedric Killings. The collision damaged a vertebra in Killings' neck, ending his season, and ultimately leading him to retire. This injury caused him to be placed on the Injured Reserve, ending Hall's season after only three games.

=== New Orleans Saints ===
Hall signed with the New Orleans Saints on May 12, 2010. He was waived/injured on June 15, and subsequently placed on injured reserve. He was released from injured reserve with an injury settlement on June 21.

=== Detroit Lions ===
Hall was signed to the Detroit Lions practice squad on December 14, 2010.
