= Charles F. Brush High School =

Public secondary school in Ohio, United States

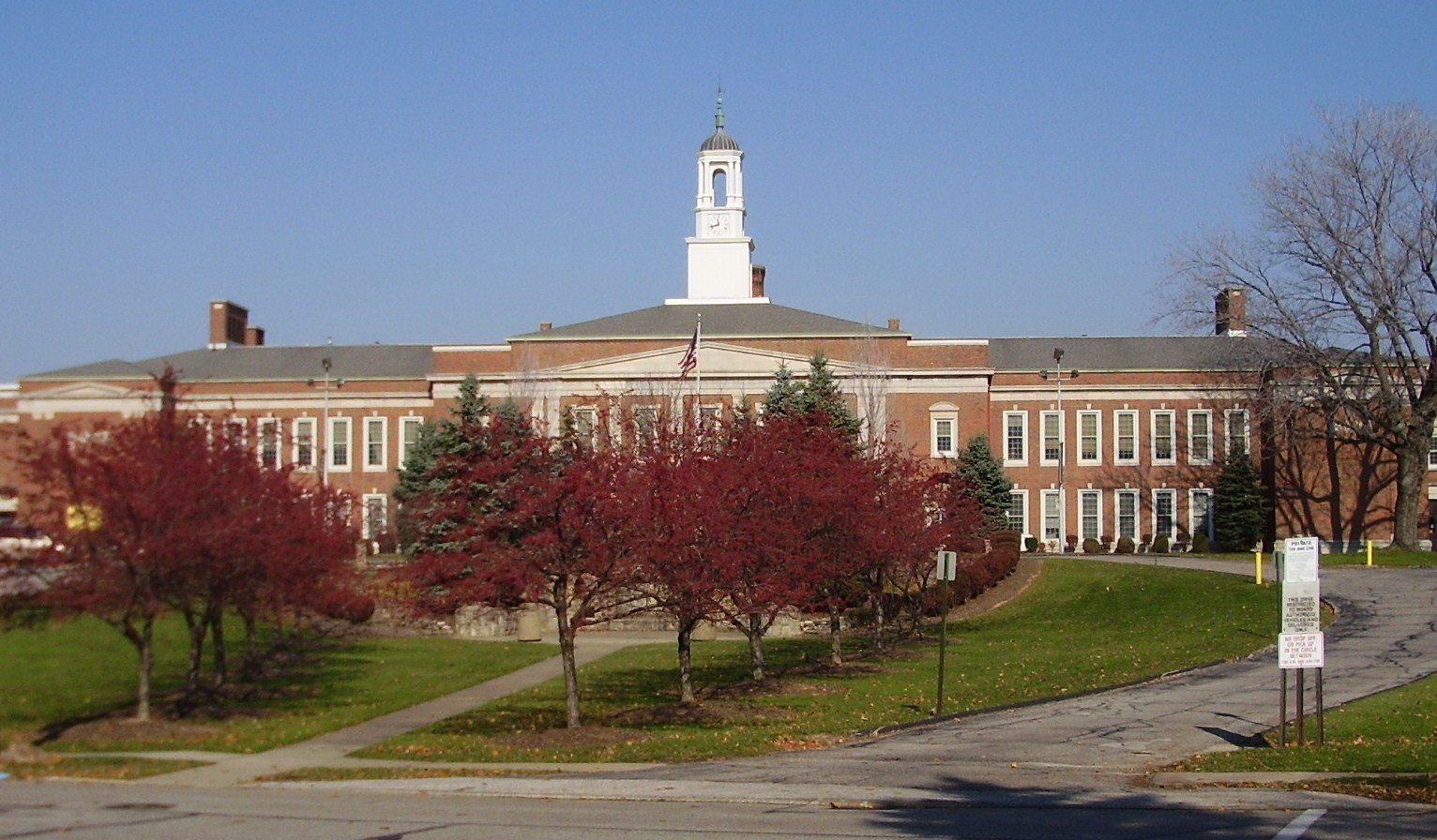

Location
- 4875 Glenlyn Road; Lyndhurst, Ohio 44124; United States; 41°31′20″N 81°30′17″W

Information
- Type: Public, coeducational
- Established: 1927
- School district: South Euclid–Lyndhurst City School District
- Principal: Marinise Harris
- Teaching staff: 48.60 (FTE)
- Grades: 9–12
- Enrollment: 1,030 (2024–2025)
- Student to teacher ratio: 21.19
- Colors: Brown and gold
- Fight song: Washington and Lee
- Athletics conference: United Athletic Conference
- Mascot: Arcy the Arc Lamp
- Nickname: Arcs
- Rival: Mayfield Wildcats
- Accreditation: North Central Association of Colleges and Schools
- Website: brush.selschools.org

Charles F. Brush High School is a public high school in Lyndhurst, Ohio. The school is named for Charles F. Brush, the Ohio-born inventor of the arc light.

Brush has 1,334 students as of the 2017–2018 school year. The school, which is situated close to the border with neighboring South Euclid, serves as the sole high school in the South Euclid–Lyndhurst City School District.

== School history ==
In 1912, prior to the construction of Brush High School, students attended South Euclid School House at the corner of Mayfield & Green Roads. The first class graduated in 1916. Brush High School opened in 1927, providing students in South Euclid and Lyndhurst with a centralized high school.

In 1961, Korb Field became the brightest nighttime football field in the country as General Electric engineers from Nela Park installed experimental mercury floodlights. In 1962 the B wing and John C. Welser Gymnasium were added, giving the school a new library and gym. In 1974 the C wing, which houses mostly the art and business departments, and the D wing, housing a new cafeteria and the science and math departments were added. In 2002 artificial turf was installed in Korb Field. 2008 – Former First Lady and 2008 presidential candidate Hillary Clinton visited Brush High School for a February 15 rally.

== Sports ==
The Brush campus is home to six tennis courts, a turfed multipurpose athletic field for football and soccer, a track, and a softball field. The Arcs baseball team uses the facilities at Greenview Upper Elementary School, the swim team uses the pools at Euclid High School, and the hockey team uses the Cleveland Heights Recreation Center ice rink as their home rink. As of 2026, they compete in the United Athletic Conference.

== Notable alumni ==
- Pharaoh Brown (born 1994), tight end for the Indianapolis Colts (NFL)
- Eric Carmen (1949-2024), singer-songwriter and lead singer of the Raspberries
- Sharon Creech (born 1945), author
- Cathi Forbes (born 1965), Maryland legislator
- Alexander Gelman (born 1960), theater director
- Stephen Hadley (born 1947), National Security Advisor under the Bush administration
- Roy Hall (born 1983), former professional football player
- Gen. Carter Ham (born 1952), former Commanding General, U.S. Africa Command (US Army)
- Simone Jelks (born 1986), professional basketball referee in the NBA
- Ken Landenberger (1928-1960), professional baseball player in MLB
- Jim Laughlin (born 1958), professional football player in the NFL
- Dan Masteller (born 1968), professional baseball player in MLB
- The Poni-Tails, musical trio known for 1958 hit song "Born Too Late" (Toni Cistone, Karen Topinka and Patricia Ann McCabe)
- Jason Pryor (born 1987), Olympic men's épée fencer
- Lucie Salhany (born 1946), entertainment executive, former chairman of Fox Broadcasting Company
- Ari Daniel Shapiro (born c. 1979), science journalist and reporter for NPR
- Michael Silvestro (born 1958), businessman
- Rick Smith Jr. (born 1981), professional illusionist and card thrower
- Steve Stone (born 1947), former professional baseball player in MLB, named an All-Star and Cy Young Award winner; TV color commentator
- Dave Tobik (born 1953), former professional baseball player in MLB
- Carl Walz (born 1955), NASA astronaut
- Jiggs Whigham (born 1943), first jazz instructor in Europe, jazz trombone player
