= Double Trouble (soundtrack) =

Soundtrack album by Elvis Presley
- Released: June 1, 1967
- Recorded: May 1963, June 1966
- Studios: Radio Recorders (Hollywood); MGM (Hollywood)
- Genres: Rock, pop
- Length: 22:36
- Label: RCA Victor
- Producer: Jeff Alexander

Elvis Presley chronology
Easy Come, Easy Go (1967)	Double Trouble (1967)	Clambake (1967)

Singles from Double Trouble
- 1. "Long Legged Girl (with the Short Dress On)" Released: April 1967

Professional ratings
Review scores
Source	Rating
Allmusic	1/5 stars

Double Trouble is the fifteenth soundtrack album by American singer and musician Elvis Presley, released by RCA Victor in mono and stereo, LPM/LSP 3787, in June 1967. It is the soundtrack to the 1967 film of the same name starring Presley. Recording sessions took place at Radio Recorders and at Metro-Goldwyn-Mayer studios in Hollywood, California, on June 28, 29, and 30, 1966. It peaked at number 47 on the Billboard 200.

== Background ==
After his enthusiasm for his gospel album How Great Thou Art made in the previous month in Nashville, the soundtrack returned Presley to the records for movies.

== Content ==
Presley had usually insisted on working in the comfortable environment of a regular recording studio, and had avoided the large movie studio sound stages, but MGM executives with an eye on budgets insisted on moving the soundtrack recordings after the first night to just such a sound stage. A frustrated Elvis dutifully went along, but the final straw was having to sing "Old MacDonald", Presley storming out of the session in a huff after finishing a very short master recording of "Long Legged Girl (with the Short Dress On)". That song would be issued as a single in late April, prior to the film's premiere, and would peak at an anemic number 63 on the Billboard Hot 100.

Nine songs were recorded for the film, coming in at a brief 17:11 and far too short for a normal LP. To bring up the running time, three tracks recorded at the "lost album" sessions of May 1963, were added to push the album over the twenty-minute mark. Two had already been issued as b-sides to singles, "Never Ending", the flipside to a four-year-old album track "Such a Night", and "Blue River" on the back of an eight-year-old vault track, "Tell Me Why". "It Won't Be Long" was recorded for the film but was not used.

== Reissues ==
In 1994, RCA reissued the Double Trouble and Spinout soundtrack albums on a "Double Feature" CD. Double Trouble was reissued in 2004 on the Follow That Dream label in a special edition that contained the original album tracks along with a selection of alternate takes.

== Track listing ==
=== Original release ===
Side one
No.	Title	Writer(s)	Recording date	Length
1.	"Double Trouble"	Doc Pomus, Mort Shuman	June 29, 1966	1:38
2.	"Baby, If You'll Give Me All of Your Love"	Joy Byers	June 29, 1966	1:47
3.	"Could I Fall in Love"	Randy Starr	June 28, 1966	1:42
4.	"Long Legged Girl (with the Short Dress On)"	J. Leslie McFarland, Winfield Scott	June 29, 1966	1:27
5.	"City by Night"	Bill Giant, Bernie Baum, Florence Kaye	June 28, 1966	3:04
6.	"Old MacDonald"	Randy Starr	June 29, 1966	2:04

Side two
No.	Title	Writer(s)	Recording date	Length
1.	"I Love Only One Girl"	Sid Tepper, Roy C. Bennett	June 29, 1966	1:52
2.	"There Is So Much World to See"	Randy Starr	June 28, 1966	1:53
3.	"It Won't Be Long" (bonus track)	Ben Weisman, Sid Wayne	June 29, 1966	1:44
4.	"Never Ending" (bonus track)	Buddy Kaye, Philip Springer	May 26, 1963	1:57
5.	"Blue River" (bonus track)	Paul Evans, Fred Tobias	May 27, 1963	2:11
6.	"What Now, What Next, Where To" (bonus track)	Hal Blair, Don Robertson	May 26, 1963	1:56

=== Follow That Dream reissue ===
Tracks 1−12 are the original album tracks.

No.	Title	Length
13.	"Double Trouble" (take 1)	1:39
14.	"Baby, If You'll Give Me All Of Your Love" (take 2)	2:25
15.	"I Love Only One Girl" (take 1)	2:25
16.	"It Won't Be Long" (takes 1,2)	2:21
17.	"Long Legged Girl" ([2nd version] takes 1,2)	2:40
18.	"Could I Fall In Love" (take 6 [undubbed master])	2:27
19.	"There Is So Much World To See" (take 10)	2:27

No.	Title	Length
20.	"Long Legged Girl" ([1st version] take 6)	1:44
21.	"City By Night" (take 3/10)	2:56
22.	"It Won't Be Long" (take 5)	1:47
23.	"Double Trouble" (takes 2,3)	1:50
24.	"Baby, If You'll Give Me All Of Your Love" (takes 3,4)	2:49
25.	"Could I Fall In Love" (harmony take 1)	1:48
Total length:		51:54

== Personnel ==
- Elvis Presley − vocals
- The Jordanaires − backing vocals
- Richard Noel − trombone
- Boots Randolph − saxophone
- Pete Drake − pedal steel guitar
- Scotty Moore − electric guitar
- Tiny Timbrell − acoustic guitar
- Mike Deasy − electric guitar ("City by Night")
- Charlie McCoy − harmonica
- Floyd Cramer − piano
- Bob Moore − double bass
- Jerry Scheff − bass guitar ("City by Night")
- D. J. Fontana − drums
- Buddy Harman − drums
- Butch Parker − saxophone ("City by Night")
- Mike Henderson − saxophone ("City by Night")
- Toxey Sewell − drums ("City by Night")

== Charts ==
Album

Year	Chart	Position
1967	Billboard Pop Albums	47
