= Kevin Lustgarten =

Venezuelan social media personality

- Education: Tufts University
- Occupations: Videographer, iOS Engineer

Kevin Lustgarten is an internet and social media personality from Caracas, Venezuela. Having featured on platforms including BBC, Business Insider, and Daily Mail, his videos have been independently viewed over 400 million times.

== Early life ==
Born in Aventura, FL, Lustgarten moved with his family to Caracas, Venezuela in his infancy. At the age of 11, he began watching YouTube tutorials on the basics of Adobe After Effects in an effort to teach himself video editing. His interest in entertainment also led him to take magic lessons during middle school.

After graduating Colegio Moral y Luces “Herzl Bialik” High School in 2013, Lustgarten moved back to the United States and matriculated at Tufts University in Medford, MA where he studied Computer Science and graduated with Magna Cum Laude honors in 2017.

== Career ==
While still enrolled at Tufts University, Lustgarten began sharing videos with the hopes of attracting a following on Instagram in June 2015. After gaining notable traction via both a shared and personal account on the platform, Lustgarten took a summer job as a Software Engineer at Google where he worked on a YouTube-focused video effects team. His work at Google, which involved writing code that allowed users to add effects to their already uploaded clips, allowed him to continue building upon the knowledge of video technology that he had acquired through his own efforts at content creation.

After achieving notable success on his Instagram page, Lustgarten began to be featured on various internet platforms including the front page of Reddit, Bored Panda, LADBible, Viral Thread, and NowThis. Throughout his career, he has collaborated with a number of other content creators and video influencers including Lele Pons, Hannah Stocking, Inanna, Josh Horton, and Rick Smith Jr.

Lustgarten has also made appearances on American, Venezuelan, Colombian, Russian, Chinese and Japanese television, as well as on some well-known YouTube channels, such as “Un Poco De Todo.” Other organizations to showcase his content include BBC, The Sacramento Kings, Business Insider, and The Olympics.
