= Simone Jelks =

American basketball referee

- Born: March 9, 1986 (age 40); Cleveland, Ohio, U.S.
- Education: University of Southern California; Case Western Reserve University (M.P.H.); Cleveland State University (M.ED)
- Occupation: NBA referee

Simone Marie Jelks (born March 9, 1986) is an American professional basketball referee in the National Basketball Association (NBA), wearing number 81. Jelks became the seventh woman to be a full-time NBA referee. As of the 2020–21 NBA season Jelks has officiated 49 regular-season games, including 16 regular-season games as a non-staff official during the 2019–20 NBA season. She is in her second season as an NBA referee.

== Early life ==
Jelks was born on March 9, 1986, in Cleveland, Ohio. In 2004, she graduated from Charles F. Brush High School in Lyndhurst, Ohio. While attending Charles F. Brush High School Jelks became the school's career leader in points, steals, rebounds and free throws. In 2015, she was inducted into the school's Athletic Hall of Fame.

== College basketball career and education ==
Jelks played college basketball for the USC Trojans women's basketball team from 2004 to 2008. She was named to the Pac-12 All-Defensive Team for the 2007–08 season. Jelks graduated from the University of Southern California in 2008 with a degree in health promotion and disease prevention. She also earned a master's degree in Public Health from Case Western Reserve University (2011) and a master's degree in Urban Secondary Teaching from Cleveland State University (2013).

== Officiating career ==
Jelks refereed three years of college basketball, officiating games for the Mid-American Conference and the Horizon League. She also has three seasons of NBA G League officiating experience.

During the 2019–20 NBA season Jelks officiated 16 regular-season games as a non-staff official. Jelks along with Andy Nagy and Suyash Mehta were promoted to the NBA officiating staff on December 23, 2020.

During the 2020–21 NBA season Jelks officiated 33 regular-season games during her first season on the NBA officiating staff.
