= Fred Tobias =

American songwriter (1928–2021)

Fred Tobias (March 25, 1928, New York City – May 20, 2021, Naples, Florida) was an American songwriter, who was most prominent in the 1950s, 1960s and 1970s.

Tobias' songs have been performed by numerous performers, including Elvis Presley, Bobby Rydell, The Poni-Tails, Patti Page, Susan Maughan, Hank Locklin, Jimmy Jones, Roy Orbison, k.d. Lang, Showaddywaddy and Ricky Nelson. His most successful songs were "Good Timin' by Jimmy Jones, "Little Bitty Girl" by Bobby Rydell, "Johnny Will" by Pat Boone and "Hello, This is Joanie" by Paul Evans. His song "Born Too Late" by the Poni-Tails reached number 7 in the US and number 5 in the UK in 1958. His "Blue River" co-written with Paul Evans was performed by Elvis Presley in 1966, reaching number 22 in the UK charts.

Tobias worked with several other composers including Lee Pockriss, Charles Strouse, Burt Bacharach, Clint Ballard Jr., Stanley Lebowsky and Paul Evans. He also contributed to film musicals writing "Take Off With Us" from All That Jazz with Stanley Lebowsky and the lyrics for the musicals Gantry, Fosse and Pousse-Café.

Tobias died on May 20, 2021, aged 93.
