= Pharaoh Brown =

American football player (born 1994)

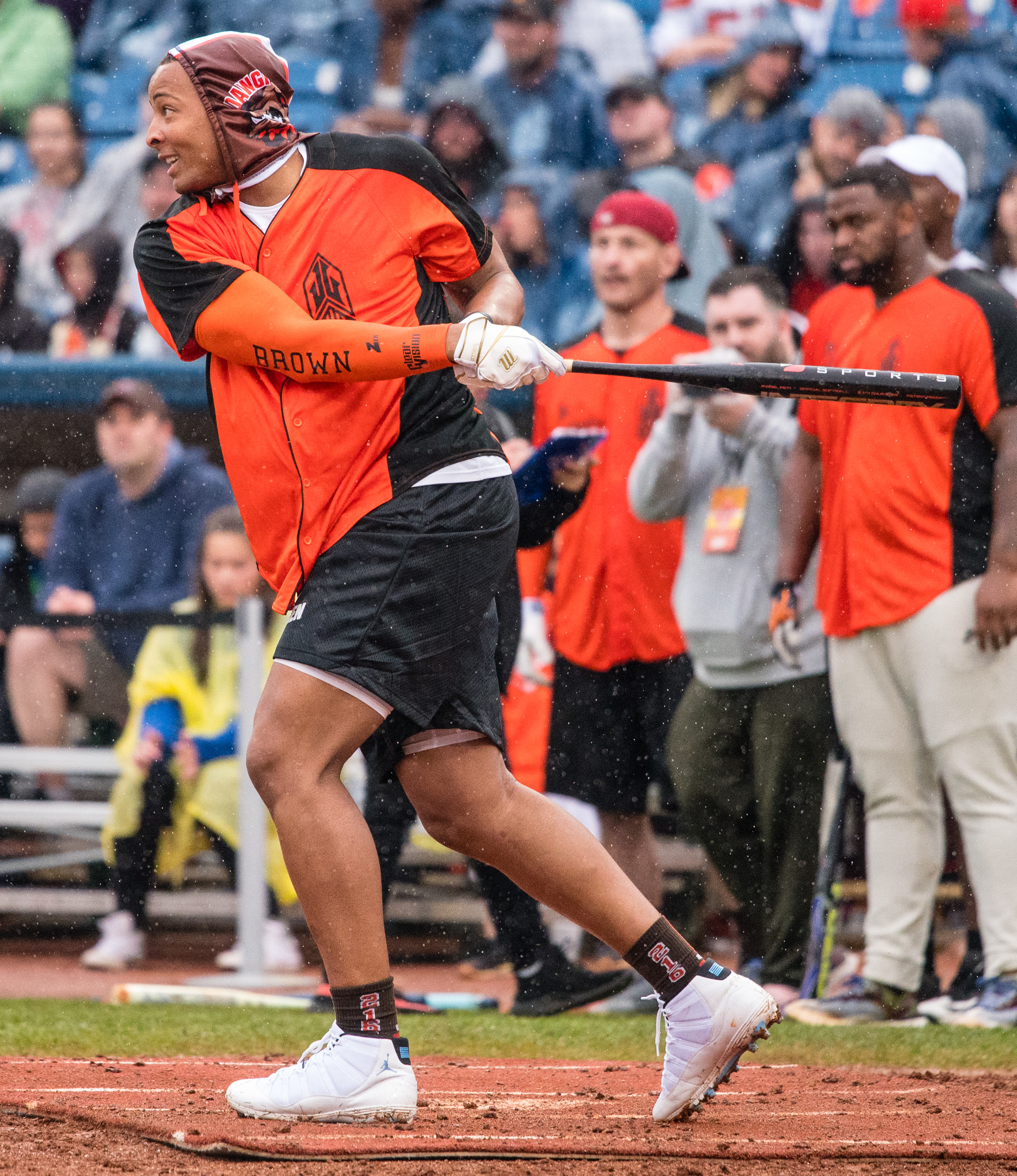
- Brown in 2019

No. 49 – Indianapolis Colts
- Position: Tight end
- Roster status: Active

Personal information
- Born: May 4, 1994 (age 32); Cleveland, Ohio, U.S.
- Listed height: 6 ft 5 in (1.96 m)
- Listed weight: 246 lb (112 kg)

Career information
- High school: Brush (Lyndhurst, Ohio)
- College: Oregon (2012–2016)
- NFL draft: 2017: undrafted

Career history
- Oakland Raiders (2017); Cleveland Browns (2018–2019); Houston Texans (2020–2022); Cleveland Browns (2022); Indianapolis Colts (2023)*; New England Patriots (2023); Seattle Seahawks (2024); Miami Dolphins (2025)*; Arizona Cardinals (2025); Indianapolis Colts (2026–present)
- * Offseason or practice squad member only

Awards and highlights
- 2× First-team All-Pac-12 (2014, 2016)

Career NFL statistics as of Week 11, 2026
- Receptions: 75
- Receiving yards: 759
- Receiving touchdowns: 3
- Stats at Pro Football Reference

Pharaoh Brown (born May 4, 1994) is an American professional football tight end for the Indianapolis Colts of the National Football League (NFL). He was signed by the Oakland Raiders as an undrafted free agent following the 2017 NFL draft. He played college football for the Oregon Ducks.

== Early life ==
Brown grew up in Lyndhurst, Ohio, where he played football and basketball at Brush High School, graduating in June 2012. During the college recruiting process, Brown initially committed to play for Michigan in May 2011, but ultimately signed his letter of intent to play at Oregon in February 2012.

== College career ==
Brown played college football at the University of Oregon. During his first year with the Ducks (2012), he was only targeted 3 times making 2 receptions for 42 yards. The following year, Brown appeared in 7 games making 3 starts and made 10 receptions for 123 yards, and 2 touchdowns. During his junior year, Brown would make his most touchdown receptions during his collegiate career at 6, while appearing in 9 games and starting 8. He made 25 receptions for 420 yards. Brown did not play football in 2015 due to a leg injury suffered during the 2014 season, during a game against Utah where he tore two ligaments in his knee. In Brown's senior year (2016), he would again appear in 9 games and start 8 of them, while being targeted 46 times and making 33 receptions. He scored 5 touchdowns while receiving for 426 yards.

== Professional career ==
Pre-draft measurables
Height	Weight	Arm length	Hand span	Wingspan	40-yard dash	10-yard split	20-yard split	20-yard shuttle	Three-cone drill	Vertical jump	Broad jump	Bench press
6 ft 5 5/8 in (1.97 m)	255 lb (116 kg)	35 5/8 in (0.90 m)	10 3/8 in (0.26 m)	6 ft 11 7/8 in (2.13 m)	4.83 s	1.69 s	2.82 s	4.46 s	7.24 s	34.0 in (0.86 m)	8 ft 7 in (2.62 m)	24 reps
All values from NFL Combine/Pro Day

=== Oakland Raiders ===
Following the 2017 NFL draft, Brown was signed by the Oakland Raiders as an undrafted free agent on May 5, 2017. He was waived on September 2, 2017, and was signed to the Raiders' practice squad the next day. He was promoted to the active roster on December 23, 2017.

On September 1, 2018, Brown was waived by the Raiders.

=== Cleveland Browns (first stint) ===
On September 25, 2018, Brown was signed by the Cleveland Browns' practice squad. Brown was elevated to the Browns' active roster on October 23. He was placed on injured reserve on December 8, with a shoulder injury.

Brown re-signed with the Browns on April 20, 2020. He was placed on the active/physically unable to perform list at the start of training camp on July 29, and activated from the list ten days later. Brown was waived by the Browns on September 6.

=== Houston Texans ===
On September 14, 2020, Brown was signed to the Houston Texans practice squad, and promoted to the active roster the next day. In Week 10 of the 2020 season against the Browns, he had his first professional touchdown.

Brown re-signed with the Texans on March 24, 2021. He played in 15 games with 12 starts, recording 23 catches for 171 yards.

On March 24, 2022, Brown re-signed with the Texans. He was waived on October 4.

=== Cleveland Browns (second stint) ===
On October 6, 2022, Brown was signed by the Browns. He played in 13 games for Cleveland, hauling in 5 catches for 45 yards.

=== Indianapolis Colts ===
On April 10, 2023, Brown signed with the Indianapolis Colts. Brown was released by Indianapolis on August 29.

=== New England Patriots ===
On August 30, 2023, Brown was signed to the New England Patriots practice squad. He was promoted to the active roster on September 4. On September 24, Brown scored his first touchdown for the Patriots vs the New York Jets on a 58-yard touchdown from Mac Jones.

=== Seattle Seahawks ===
On March 12, 2024, Brown signed with the Seattle Seahawks. He made 15 appearances (7 starts) for Seattle, posting 8 receptions for 65 yards.

=== Miami Dolphins ===
On March 14, 2025, Brown signed a one-year contract with the Miami Dolphins. He was released on August 26 as part of final roster cuts.

=== Arizona Cardinals ===
On October 15, 2025, Brown signed with the Arizona Cardinals' practice squad. On December 3, he was signed to the active roster.

=== Indianapolis Colts (second stint) ===
On August 6, 2026, Brown signed with the Indianapolis Colts. Brown was released by the Colts as a part of final roster cuts on August 30; he was re-signed to the team's practice squad the following day. On October 13, Brown was signed to the active roster.
