= South Euclid, Ohio =

- City
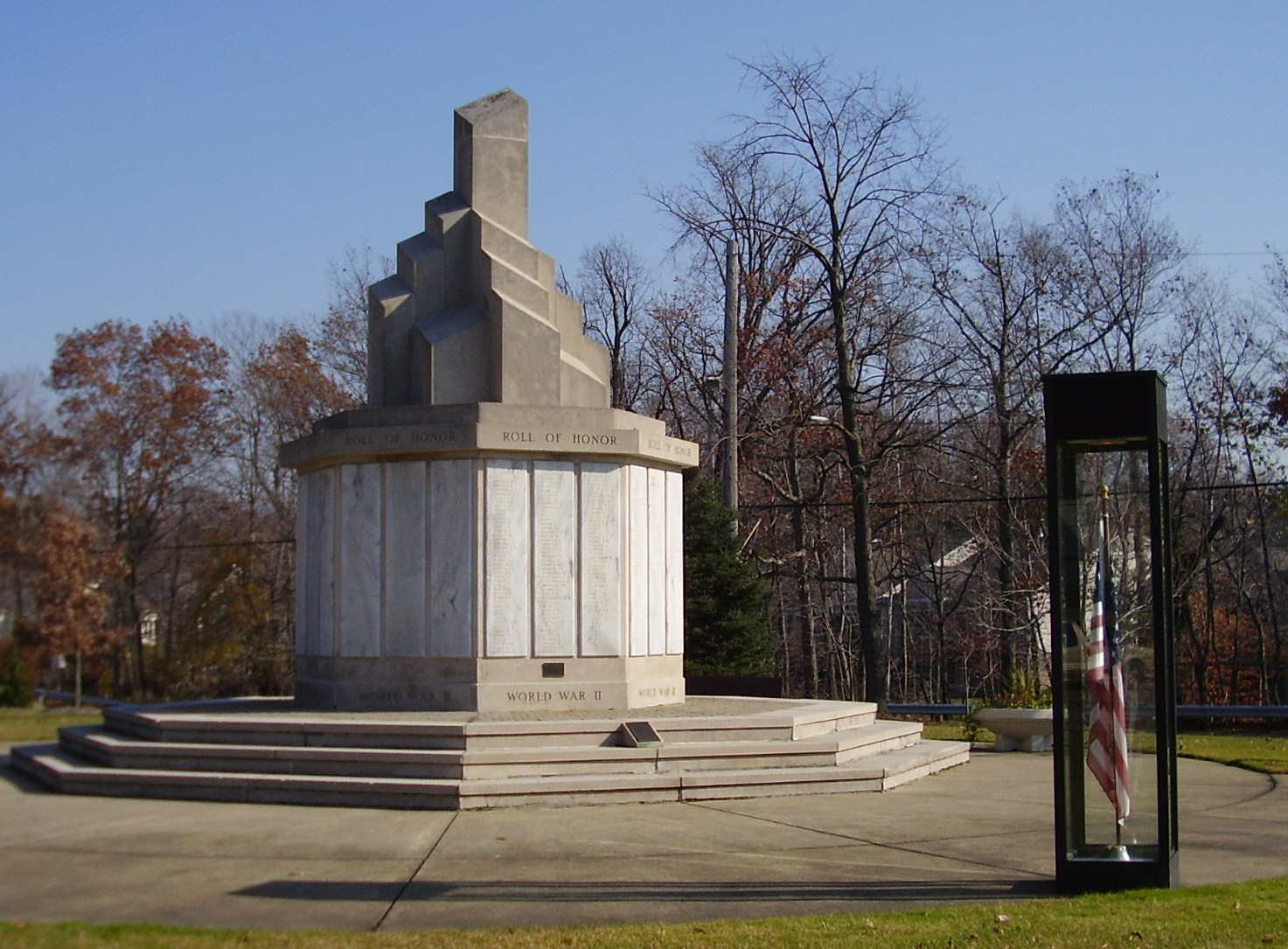
- South Euclid War Memorial

- Flag Seal Logo
- Interactive map of South Euclid, Ohio
- Location within Ohio Location within the United States
- Coordinates: 41°31′19″N 81°31′40″W
- Country: United States
- State: Ohio
- County: Cuyahoga
- Euclid Township formed: 1809
- Village incorporation: 1917
- City incorporation: 1941

Government
  - Type: Mayor-council
  - Mayor: Georgine Welo (D)

Area
  - Total: 4.66 sq mi (12.07 km^{2})
  - Land: 4.66 sq mi (12.07 km^{2})
  - Water: 0 sq mi (0.00 km^{2})
- Elevation: 958 ft (292 m)

Population (2020)
  - Total: 21,883
  - Density: 4,696.9/sq mi (1,813.48/km^{2})
- census
- Time zone: UTC-5 (EST)
  - Summer (DST): UTC-4 (EDT)
- Zip code: 44121
- Area code: 216
- FIPS code: 39-73264
- GNIS feature ID: 1049189
- Website: https://www.cityofsoutheuclid.com/

South Euclid is a city in Cuyahoga County, Ohio, United States. It is an inner-ring suburb of Cleveland located on the city's east side. As of the 2020 census, the population was 21,883.

== History ==
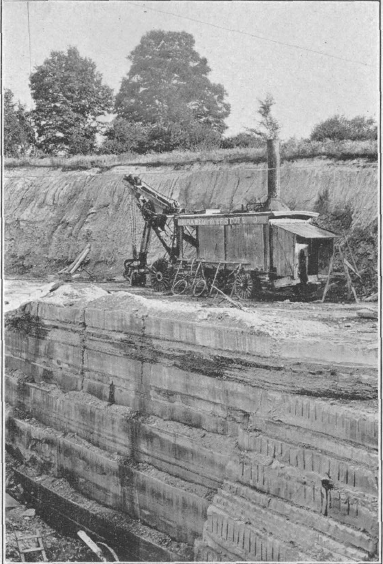
South Euclid Bluestone Quarry

The land currently comprising South Euclid was part of the Western Reserve, obtained via treaty with the Iroquois confederation in 1796 by the Connecticut Land Company. In 1797, Moses Cleaveland named the area east of the Cuyahoga River Euclid, after the Greek mathematician and "patron saint" of surveyors. Euclid Township was officially formed in 1809. In 1828, Euclid Township was divided into nine districts, with South Euclid becoming district two.

The earliest industry was farming. But, by the 1860s, quarrying of the area's rich Bluestone deposits replaced agriculture as the town's economic mainstay. Two separate locations – one along Nine Mile Creek near present-day Quarry Park at South Belvoir and Monticello Boulevards, and the other along what is today part of the Euclid Creek reservation – were consolidated by Forest City Stone Company in the 1870s, creating one of the region's largest producers of the stone. By the end of the 19th century, the northern section of the town had become known as Bluestone village.

Residents of South Euclid eventually wanted autonomy from the larger Euclid Township, and voted on October 13, 1917, to be incorporated as a village, with Edward C. Foote being elected the first mayor a few weeks on November 6. At the same time, with the decline of the Bluestone industry brought on by improvements to poured concrete, Bluestone village was absorbed into South Euclid.

South Euclid's rapid economic and population growth continued in the early decades of the 20th century, partly driven by industry in nearby Cleveland. Due in part to funding by the WPA, which helped keep people employed through the Great Depression, the village continued to grow and was officially incorporated as a city in 1941.

Population growth, which tapered during the Depression era, skyrocketed during the postwar period, driven by both the baby boom and white flight from the urban center of Cleveland. South Euclid's population peaked in the early 1970s. By 1980, lacking large tracts of available land for development, and with a population shift to exurban communities, the population of South Euclid began to shrink.

== Geography ==
Acting approximately as a central point for the east side of the Greater Cleveland area, South Euclid is bordered by Cleveland, Cleveland Heights, University Heights, Beachwood, Lyndhurst, Richmond Heights, and Euclid.

According to the United States Census Bureau, the city has a total area of 4.65 square miles (12.04 km^{2}), all of it land.

== Demographics ==
Historical population
Census	Pop.	Note	%±
1920	1,605		—
1930	4,399		174.1%
1940	6,146		39.7%
1950	15,432		151.1%
1960	27,659		79.2%
1970	29,579		6.9%
1980	25,713		−13.1%
1990	23,866		−7.2%
2000	23,537		−1.4%
2010	22,295		−5.3%
2020	21,883		−1.8%
2025 (est.)	21,248		−2.9%

Like Cleveland Heights to the west and University Heights to the south, South Euclid is racially integrated. A large portion of the city's population consists of African Americans, Italian Americans, Jews, and immigrants from Russia and other former Soviet republics.

=== Racial and ethnic composition ===
South Euclid city, Ohio – Racial and ethnic composition Note: the US Census treats Hispanic/Latino as an ethnic category. This table excludes Latinos from the racial categories and assigns them to a separate category. Hispanics/Latinos may be of any race.
Race / Ethnicity (NH = Non-Hispanic)	Pop 2000	Pop 2010	Pop 2020	% 2000	% 2010	% 2020
White alone (NH)	17,569	11,867	8,195	74.64%	53.23%	37.40%
Black or African American alone (NH)	5,005	8,988	11,596	21.26%	40.31%	52.99%
Native American or Alaska Native alone (NH)	24	16	18	0.10%	0.07%	0.08%
Asian alone (NH)	352	433	378	1.50%	1.94%	1.73%
Native Hawaiian or Pacific Islander alone (NH)	3	2	5	0.01%	0.01%	0.02%
Other race alone (NH)	56	66	152	0.24%	0.30%	0.69%
Mixed race or Multiracial (NH)	287	476	819	1.22%	2.14%	3.74%
Hispanic or Latino (any race)	241	447	730	1.02%	2.00%	3.34%
Total	23,537	22,295	21,883	100.00%	100.00%	100.00%

=== 2020 census ===
As of the 2020 census, South Euclid had a population of 21,883. The median age was 39.3 years, 20.6% of residents were under the age of 18, and 17.4% of residents were 65 years of age or older. For every 100 females there were 83.8 males, and for every 100 females age 18 and over there were 79.3 males age 18 and over.

100.0% of residents lived in urban areas, while 0.0% lived in rural areas.

There were 8,914 households in South Euclid, of which 28.5% had children under the age of 18 living in them. Of all households, 36.3% were married-couple households, 16.7% were households with a male householder and no spouse or partner present, and 40.5% were households with a female householder and no spouse or partner present. About 30.6% of all households were made up of individuals and 13.2% had someone living alone who was 65 years of age or older.

There were 9,563 housing units, of which 6.8% were vacant. The homeowner vacancy rate was 2.1% and the rental vacancy rate was 8.2%.

Racial composition as of the 2020 census
Race	Number	Percent
White	8,292	37.9%
Black or African American	11,726	53.6%
American Indian and Alaska Native	28	0.1%
Asian	386	1.8%
Native Hawaiian and Other Pacific Islander	8	0.0%
Some other race	344	1.6%
Two or more races	1,099	5.0%
Hispanic or Latino (of any race)	730	3.3%

=== 2010 census ===
According to the 2010 Census, 89.9% of South Euclid's residents spoke English, 3.2% Russian, 1.7% Spanish, 1.2% Italian, and 1.0% Yiddish as their first language.

The median income for a household in the city was $59,423, and the median income for a family was $72,340. The per capita income for the city was $27,343. About 6.7% of families and 9.3% of the population were below the poverty line, including 10.1% of those under age 18 and 6.9% of those age 65 or over.

Of the city's population over the age of 25, 37.9% hold a bachelor's degree or higher.

As of the census of 2010, there were 22,295 people, 8,913 households, and 5,791 families residing in the city. The population density was 4,794.6 inhabitants per square mile (1,851.2/km^{2}). There were 9,607 housing units at an average density of 2,066.0 per square mile (797.7/km^{2}). The racial makeup of the city was 54.1% White, 40.7% African American, 0.1% Native American, 2.0% Asian, 0.7% from other races, and 2.5% from two or more races. Hispanic or Latino of any race were 2.0% of the population.

There were 8,913 households, of which 32.6% had children under the age of 18 living with them, 41.9% were married couples living together, 19.1% had a female householder with no husband present, 4.0% had a male householder with no wife present, and 35.0% were non-families. 29.9% of all households were made up of individuals, and 9.7% had someone living alone who was 65 years of age or older. The average household size was 2.43 and the average family size was 3.04.

The median age in the city was 37.9 years. 24% of residents were under the age of 18; 10% were between the ages of 18 and 24; 25.2% were from 25 to 44; 27.7% were from 45 to 64; and 12.9% were 65 years of age or older. The gender makeup of the city was 45.6% male and 54.4% female.

== Culture ==
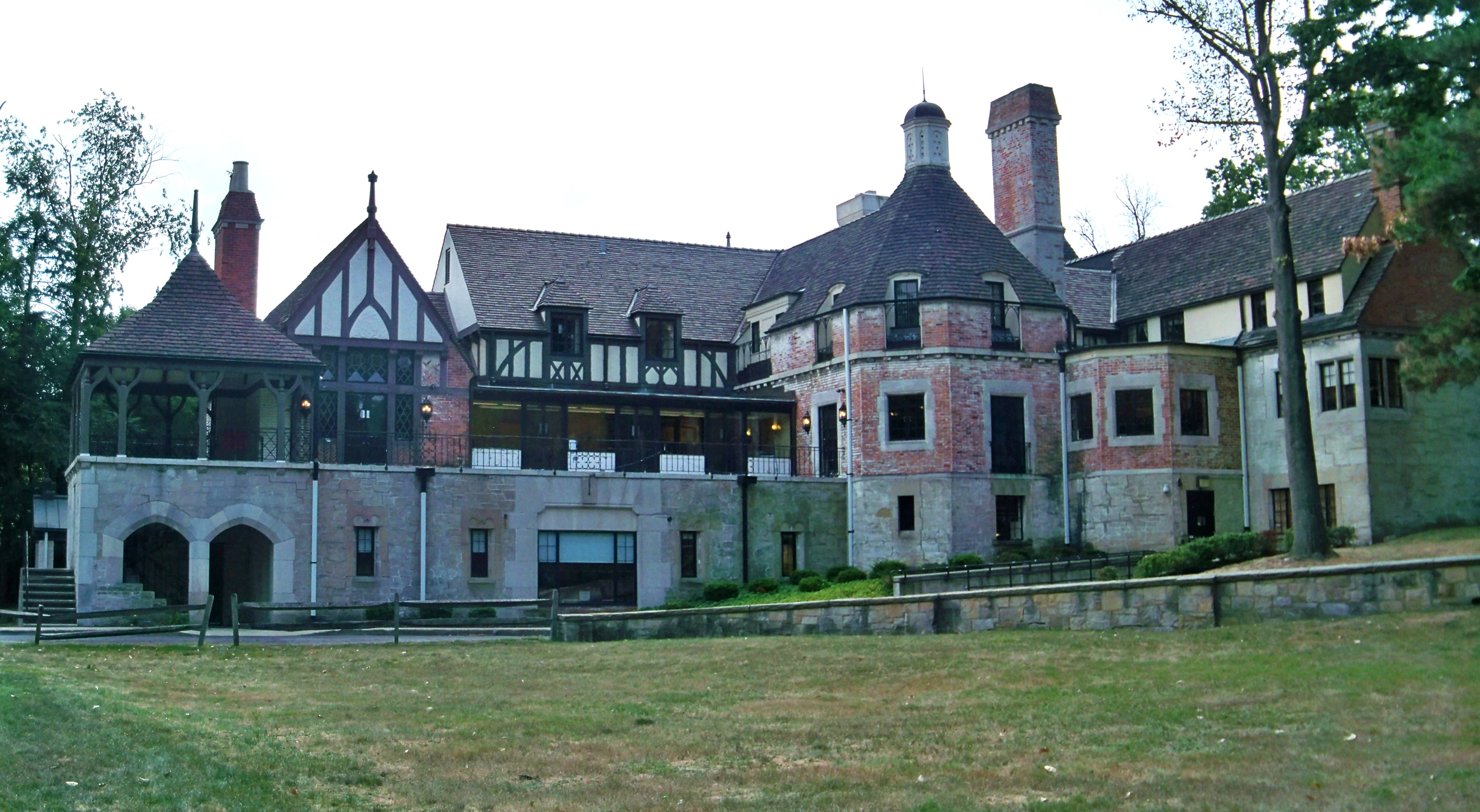
William E. Telling Mansion

The historic William E. Telling mansion, which is on the National Register of Historic Places. served as home to the South Euclid-Lyndhurst branch of the nationally renowned Cuyahoga County Public Library system. A wing of this same building, which once served as the gardener's quarters, houses the South Euclid–Lyndhurst Historical Society. In 2012, the CCPL announced plans to sell the Telling mansion and move the Library to a new facility at 1876 South Green Road. In September, 2013, the Library board voted to sell the Mansion to Cleveland investor Richard A. Barone. The mansion now houses the Museum of American Porcelain Art.

== Parks and recreation ==
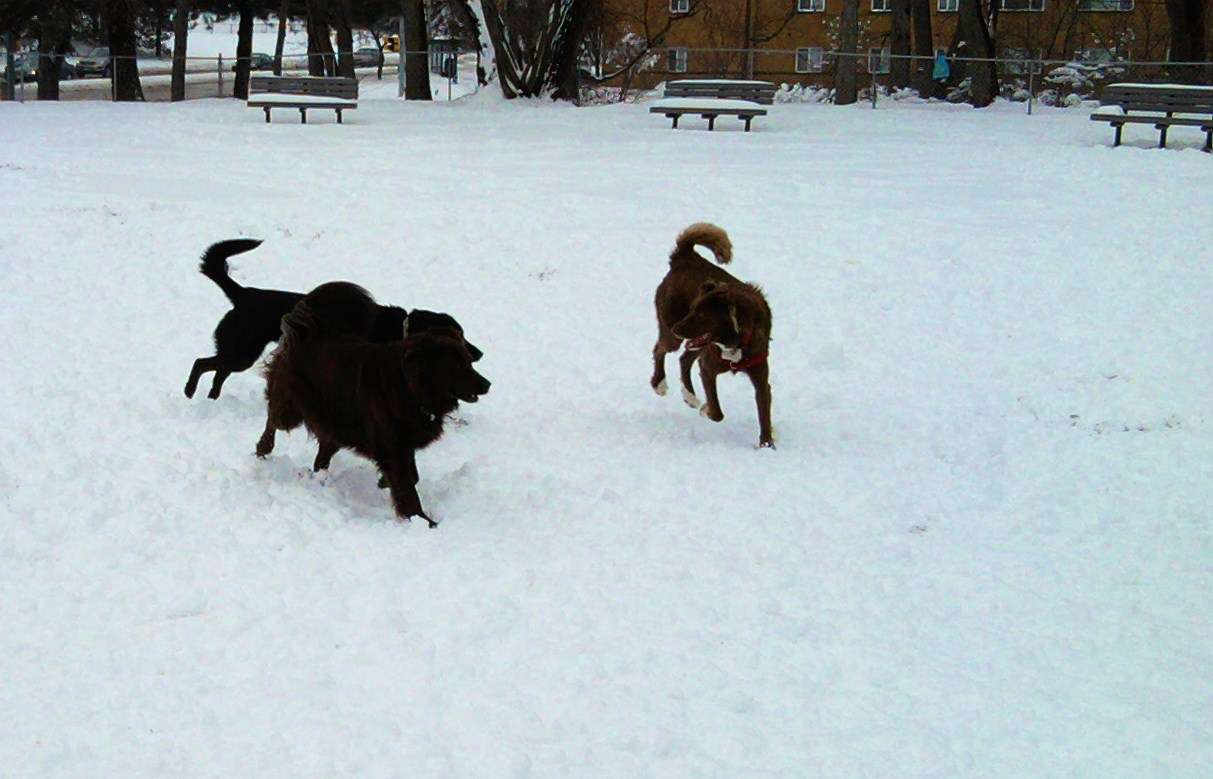
Canine friends enjoying winter play at South Euclid's dog park

There are four city-owned public parks: Quarry (divided by Monticello Boulevard into distinct North and South sections), Victory, Bexley, and Oakwood.

Quarry has a splash/sprinkle park, Victory sand volleyball courts, and Bexley a swimming pool. Quarry, Victory, and Bexley have playground equipment, and all four parks permit picnicking (although grilling facilities only remain at Bexley's pavilion and at Quarry North). Quarry and Bexley both have baseball diamonds utilized by the city's public baseball and softball leagues. Quarry Park North features a fenced off dog park, where canines can play unleashed, with a separate section for smaller dogs.

The southern portion of the Euclid Creek reservation of the Cleveland Metroparks is located in South Euclid. Nearby, the South Euclid War Memorial lists the names of those who died while serving in wartime.

South Euclid has partnered with nearby Lyndhurst to form several recreational groups, including clubs for soccer, youth football, youth softball and baseball, and basketball.

South Euclid ranked 10th out of the 114 largest cities in Ohio in terms of walkability.

== Education ==
The South Euclid-Lyndhurst City School District consists of three elementary schools, one upper elementary school, one junior high school and Charles F. Brush High School. The city was formerly home to Regina High School from 1954 to 2010. The building was purchased by nearby Notre Dame College. A small portion of South Euclid is located within the Cleveland Heights-University Heights City School District.

There is one parochial elementary school, one Catholic college preparatory school, and one college located in South Euclid: St. John's, a Lutheran school located on Mayfield Road which opened in the mid-1850s; and The Lyceum, a Catholic coeducational, college preparatory school offering a classical curriculum for grades seven through twelve.

Until 2024, South Euclid was also home to Notre Dame College, a Roman Catholic college that was located on Green Road, north of Cedar. Notre Dame was established in 1922 as an all-female institution. After 79 years, the college became coed in January 2001. In addition to their brick and mortar school, Notre Dame College offered online degree programs through the school's online campus. The college closed in May 2024.

The Japanese Language School of Cleveland (JLSC; クリーブランド日本語補習校 Kurīburando Nihongo Hoshūkō) is a weekend Japanese supplementary school for Japanese nationals and Japanese Americans; it previously held its classes in Regina High School.

== Notable people ==
- Steve Stone, broadcaster, former MLB All-Star pitcher and 1980 American League Cy Young Award winner
- David S. Ward, screenwriter and director most famous for The Sting (1973), Major League (1989) and Sleepless in Seattle (1993)
- Carl E. Walz, retired NASA astronaut
