= Joy Layne =

American singer (born 1941)

Joy Layne (born Joy Lynne Nagl on November 11, 1941) is an American former pop singer from Chicago, Illinois, United States, often compared to Sandy Duncan and with a style inspired in at least part by Teresa Brewer.

Layne signed to Mercury Records in 1956 after her mother arranged a meeting with Mercury A&R rep Art Talmadge. Her debut single was a cover of The Poni-Tails' "Your Wild Heart", which became a hit in the U.S., peaking at No. 20 on the Billboard Hot 100 early in 1957. Layne, who was 15 at the time, was attending Lyons Township High School in LaGrange, Illinois, a small-town western suburb of Chicago, when the single broke nationally. The follow-up sides, "My Suspicious Heart" and "After School," done at the same session as the first record, failed to chart, though "After School" became associated with her and was covered by Teresa Brewer, and her last recordings, produced by Lenny LaCour, were released in 1961.
