= Cards in the hat =

Throwing game

Cards in the hat, or card flip, is a card throwing game in which the players throw playing cards into a hat or other receptacle. The game requires concentration and some skill.

== Gameplay ==
A hat or shoe box is placed on the floor, and a mark is determined from where each player will throw, known as the "oche".

The first player steps up to the oche with five cards and attempts to throw them, one at a time, into the hat. Each card landing in the hat gains one point for the player.

In another version of the game, each player plays with the entire pack of 52 cards.

== See also ==
- Card throwing
