= Blue River (song) =

Single by Elvis Presley

from the album Double Trouble
- A-side: "Tell Me Why"
- Released: December 1965 or January 1966
- Recorded: May 27, 1963
- Length: 1:32
- Songwriters: Paul Evans; Fred Tobias

Elvis Presley singles chronology
"Puppet on a String" / "Wooden Heart" (1965)	"Tell Me Why" / "Blue River" (1965)	"Frankie and Johnny" / "Please Don't Stop Loving Me" (1966)

"Blue River" is a 1965 song by Elvis Presley. He released it on a single in December 1965 or January 1966.

== Writing and recording ==
The song was written by Paul Evans and Fred Tobias. Presley recorded it on May 27, 1963 at RCA's Studio B in Nashville, Tennessee.

== Track listings ==
US 7-inch single (RCA 47–8740, 1965 or January 1966)

1. "Tell Me Why"
2. "Blue River"

UK 7-inch single (1965)

1. "Blue River"
2. "Do Not Disturb"

European 7-inch single (1965)

1. "Blue River"
2. "You'll Be Gone"

French 7-inch EP (RCA Victor 86.508 M, France, 1966)

1. "Blue River"
2. "Memphis Tennessee"
3. "Puppet on a String"
4. "Tell Me Why"

== Charts ==
Chart (1965–1966)	Peak position
Belgium (Ultratop 50 Flanders)	15
Belgium (Ultratip Bubbling Under Wallonia)	–
New Zealand (Listener)	9
UK (Official Charts Company)	22
U.S. Billboard Hot 100	95
"Blue River / Do Not Disturb"
Australia (retrospect Kent Music Report)	37
