= Card throwing =

Standard playing performance card trick

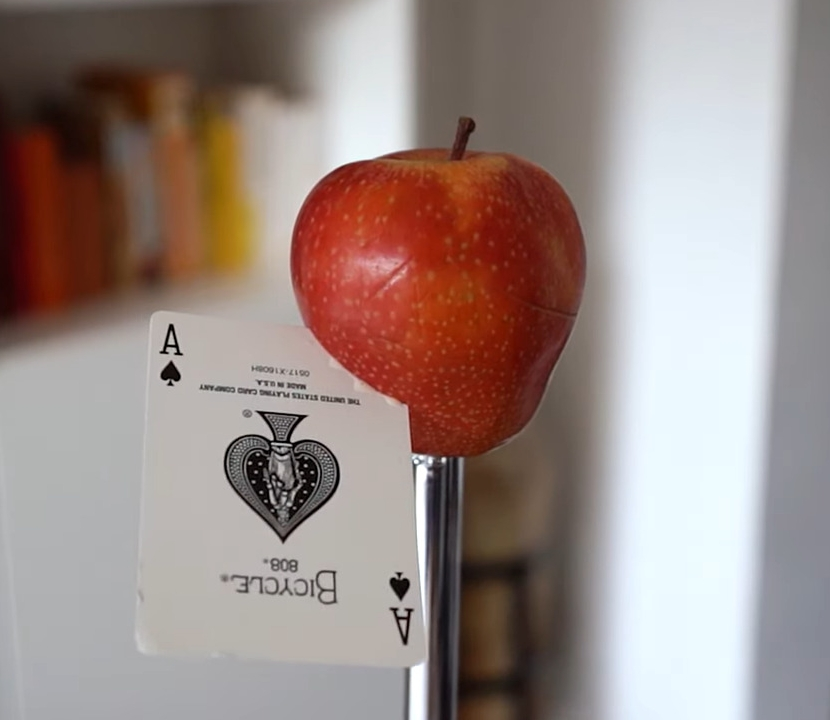
A thrown playing card embedded in an apple

Card throwing is the art of throwing standard playing cards with great accuracy or force. It is performed both as part of stage magic shows and as a competitive physical feat among magicians, with official records existing for longest distance thrown, fastest speed, highest throw, greatest accuracy, and the greatest number of cards in one minute.

== History ==
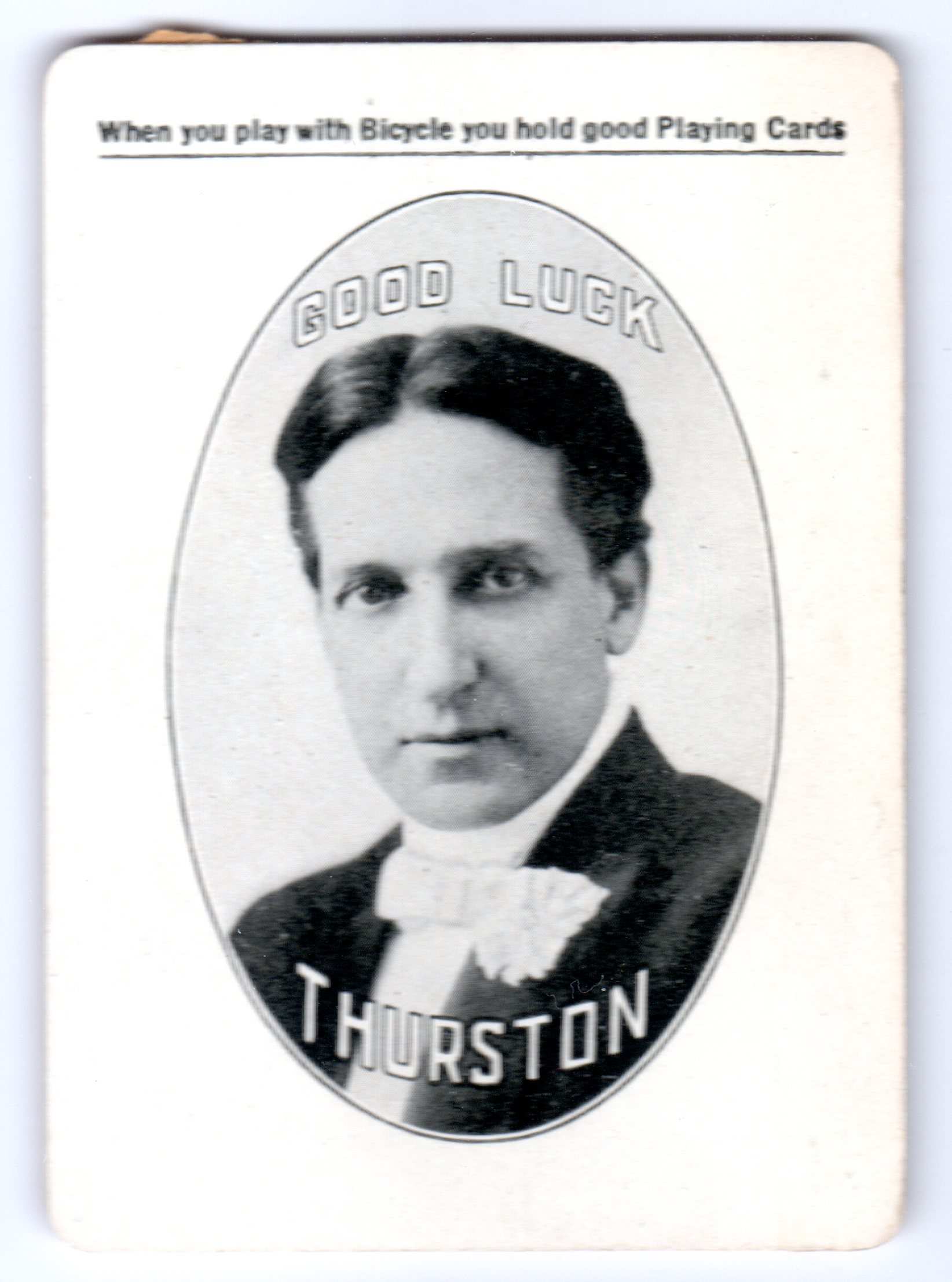
One of the many throwing cards used by master magician Howard Thurston

First popularized in the West among stage magicians during the 1800s, the art of throwing cards is called scaling. Techniques used among performers today are attributed to stage magicians in the late 19th century. The exact origins of "flying card" tricks are unknown, but Alexander Herrmann is widely attributed with first including card throwing in a major act. He would use custom-made cards, sign them, and then throw them into the audience as potential souvenirs. The magician Howard Thurston also used card throwing as a major part of his act. The cards that they used, however, were heavier than those commonly used today.

Many magicians commissioned specially printed cards, known as throwing cards, throwouts, scaling cards, or souvenir cards to use for these purposes. Generally, such cards featured the image and name of the magician and often featured optical illusions, mystical images, and text and graphics from other advertisers. Propelled Pasteboards, a blog dedicated to the history of throwing cards and related ephemera, contains examples of hundreds of specially printed throwing cards used by magicians and other performers to advertise their performances.

Today, magicians all over the world use card throwing as parts of their act. Ricky Jay, Rick Smith Jr. and Aditya Kodmur are among the most well-known people to frequently use card throwing during performance.

== Techniques ==
Playing cards and similar paper objects have very little mass and are not very aerodynamic except under certain circumstances. Simply throwing a card with no technique (that is, applying lateral speed only) usually will result in it fluttering about and falling to the ground. Achieving accuracy, distance, and force with a card requires giving it both lateral speed and angular momentum (i.e. "spin") along its z-axis. The spin creates gyroscopic stabilization so that the card's flat profile remains mostly parallel to the direction of travel and thus suffers the least possible air resistance.

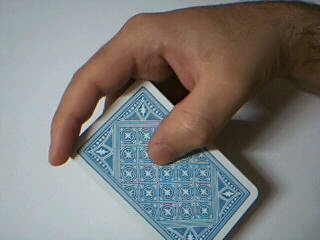
The Herrmann grip

There are multiple techniques for throwing cards in this manner. The technique often attributed to Alexander Herrmann, and taught in Ricky Jay's book Cards as Weapons (1977), involves gripping the middle of the card horizontally between the thumb and the middle finger, while the index finger rests on the corner of the card nearest the hand and away from the body. The wrist is cocked inward at a 90-degree angle, then flicked briskly outward, propelling the card. For distance and power, the technique adds motion of the forearm bending at the elbow straight outwards from a 90-degree angle simultaneous to the flicking motion of the wrist.

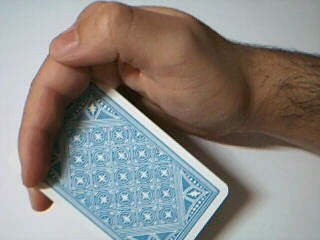
The Thurston grip

In another method created by Howard Thurston, the card is gripped between the first and second fingers, usually of the left hand, and propelled in a similar manner. There are also variations on both grips and throwing styles, some of which depend on the type of flight the magician is attempting to achieve.

Forceful throws will usually spiral somewhat on the way to the target when thrown at a long distance since most cards are not perfectly flat. With a given deck, the bend of the cards are usually similar enough to each other that this spiral is easily predictable, and a practiced magician can hit very small targets even at many yards away. It is also possible to throw a card very flat at lower speeds to get the card to land in or on top of something.

Many tricks done with thrown cards are designed to not only impress with the magician's dexterity but work on a common theme in stage magic: the illusion of danger. While the illusion of danger can be achieved by outright deception, another method is to play on people's popular misconceptions. In the case of card throwing, the magician achieves this effect by throwing the card at fragile targets such as newspaper, cigarettes, fruit, hot dogs, foam, or any other substance that the card will easily imbed in or break. While none of these objects act like human tissue in terms of wound ballistics, the magician is counting on most audience members thinking they actually are comparable, and therefore believing he or she has turned a harmless playing card into a deadly projectile.

== Records ==
- The current Guinness World Records for most playing cards thrown into watermelons in one minute is held by Aditya Kodmur (India) who threw 18 cards on the set of India's Got Talent in Mumbai, India on 5 July 2023
- The current Guinness World Records for most playing cards thrown around a human target in one minute is held by Aditya Kodmur who threw 89 cards in one minute on 22 September 2024 in Solapur, Maharashtra, India
- The current world record for farthest playing card thrown is held by Rick Smith Jr. who threw a card 65.96 metres (216 ft 5 in) on 2 December 2002. This is also the current record for the fastest throw, at 148 kilometres per hour (92 mph). Previous world record holders are Ricky Jay and Jim Karol.
- The current record for the highest throw is held by Rick Smith Jr., who, on 14 March 2015, threw a single playing card to a height of 21.41 metres (70 ft 3 in) at the Great Lake Science Center in Cleveland, Ohio.
- The world record for most accurate playing card throwing is held by Aditya Kodmur, who consecutively threw 117 cards into a target without missing on 11 December 2021.
- On 13 August 2018, Rokas Bernatonis broke the Guinness World Record for the "most one fingered playing card scales in one minute". To break the record, Rokas had to hold a deck of playing cards in one hand and use his thumb to propel ("scale") the cards from the deck a minimum distance of 12 feet (3.7 m). Rokas was able to scale 122 playing cards in one minute, beating the previous record of 114 playing cards set by magician Chris Linn. The record took place in Vilnius, Lithuania.

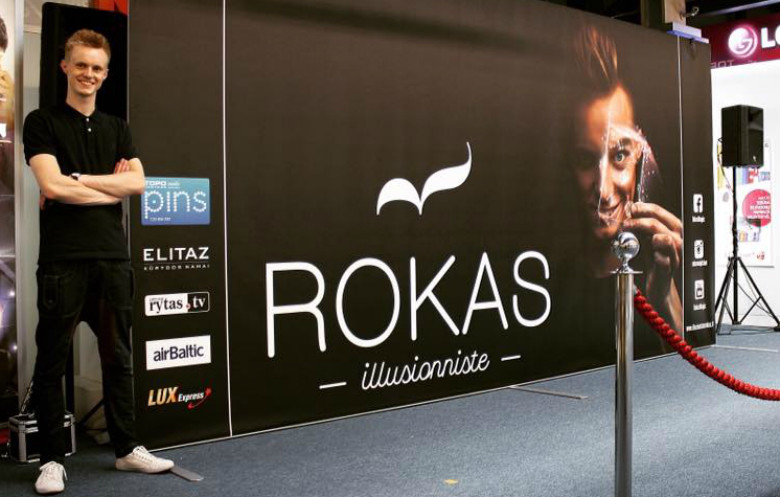
Rokas Bernatonis, who holds record for most one handed card scaling

== Urban legend about use as a weapon ==
The impressive speed that magicians could throw the cards gave rise to a myth that a card could kill or seriously injure someone if thrown correctly by a person with enough force. The book Cards as Weapons by Ricky Jay is believed to have propagated this myth even though it was originally intended to combine instruction with satire.

This myth was tested on the Discovery Channel program MythBusters, and subsequently debunked. Mythbusters co-host Adam Savage was already familiar with the throwing card trick and was shown to be adept at performing it, with his maximum throwing speed being measured at 25 miles per hour (40 km/h). The episode also featured Ricky Jay himself, who spoke of writing the book and admitted he is most likely responsible for the genesis of the myth. The hosts were able to measure the speed of his throws at about 90 miles per hour (140 km/h). After failing to throw the cards into a ballistic gelatin target with enough force that would result in injury, they used an electric motor to mechanically launch a card at 150 miles per hour (240 km/h). Offering his own body as a target, host Jamie Hyneman allowed the launcher to be fired at the exposed skin of his abdomen from a few feet away, which only resulted in a superficial paper cut. The hosts concluded that a playing card does not have sufficient mass to cause lethal damage to human tissue.

== In popular culture ==
Card throwing was a plot point in the 2016 film Now You See Me 2.

The Marvel Comics character Gambit utilises card-throwing as part of his trademark fighting style, utilising playing cards in conjunction with his mutant ability to explosively charge up objects with kinetic energy. The low mass of playing cards allows Gambit to quickly charge them up.

== See also ==
- Card manipulation
- Cards in the hat
