= Elvis' Gold Records Volume 4 =

Greatest hits album by Elvis Presley
- Released: January 2, 1968
- Recorded: June 1958 to June 1966
- Genre: Rock and roll
- Length: 29:03
- Label: RCA Victor
- Producer: Steve Sholes, Joseph Lilley, Chet Atkins, Urban Thielmann, George Stoll, Elvis Presley, Felton Jarvis

Elvis Presley chronology
Clambake (1967)	Elvis' Gold Records Volume 4 (1968)	Speedway (1968)

Professional ratings
Review scores
Source	Rating
Allmusic	4.5/5 stars

Elvis' Gold Records Volume 4 is a greatest hits album by American rock and roll singer Elvis Presley, issued by RCA Victor in mono and stereo, LPM/LSP 3921, in January 1968, with recording sessions taking place over an eight-year span at RCA Studio B in Nashville, Tennessee, and at RCA Studios and Radio Recorders in Hollywood. It is a compilation of hit singles released between 1961 and 1967, peaking at number 33 on the Billboard 200. It was certified Gold on March 27, 1992, by the Recording Industry Association of America.

== Content ==
Although he had remained a popular artist since the release Elvis' Golden Records Volume 3 (1963) by placing eight albums in the Top Ten and 17 singles in the Top 40, Presley's sales had cooled off since his heyday. The compilation album Elvis for Everyone (1965) was his first to sell under 300,000 copies, and his last five soundtrack albums had all done progressively worse in the marketplace, units shifted dropping to under 200,000. Singles were no longer reaching the Top 40 automatically, and while his recent single "Big Boss Man" sold 350,000, that fell short of the needed 500,000 to qualify for gold status in US singles sales. Usually a guaranteed seller, this volume sold only 400,000 copies; better than his recent soundtrack albums, but well off the mark set by its three predecessors. Colonel Tom Parker's ignorance of popular music trends and styles and Presley's unwavering loyalty to Parker were ruining Presley's career.

Elvis' Gold Records Volume 4 comprises five Top 40 A-sides along with seven b-sides, five of which also made the Top 40. Three songs had not been written expressly for Presley: "Love Letters" came from the 1945 film of the same name; "Witchcraft" had been a 1956 hit record for The Spiders; and "What'd I Say" was the Ray Charles classic from 1959. Three B-sides, "Lonely Man", "A Mess of Blues", and "Just Tell Her Jim Said Hello" were old enough to have been included on Elvis' Golden Records Volume 3, and another b-side, "Ain't That Loving You Baby", came from RCA's furlough session of June 10, 1958, set up to augment their stock of Presley product while their star was in the United States Army.

The first three Gold Records volumes covered two to three years of singles releases, but there was a five-year gap between this and the previous volume. This would be the last of the series issued during Presley's lifetime. Elvis' Gold Records Volume 5, which included singles from 1969 to 1977, was released posthumously in 1984.

By 1968, the practice of releasing LPs in monophonic sound was being discontinued. As a result, RCA Victor issued very few mono copies of Elvis' Gold Records Vol. 4 and they are considered valuable collector's items.

Since these songs had been recorded over a period of several years, the album had several producers, including Steve Sholes, Joseph Lilley, Chet Atkins, Urban Thielmann, George Stoll, Presley himself, and Felton Jarvis.

== Reissues ==
RCA first reissued the original 12 track album on compact disc in 1989. The 1997 reissue added six bonus tracks and altered the running order. "Rock-A-Hula Baby" dated from the 1961 soundtrack to Blue Hawaii, pulled off that album as the flip to accompany "Can't Help Falling in Love" as a single. Three tracks were the advance singles for their respective soundtracks: "Bossa Nova Baby" for Fun in Acapulco; "Kissin' Cousins" for its album; and "Return to Sender", released a month before Girls! Girls! Girls!. "Viva Las Vegas" (the flipside to "What'd I Say"), by the team of Doc Pomus and Mort Shuman, would prove a more durable Elvis recording, receiving myriad cover versions including those by the Dead Kennedys, Bruce Springsteen, and Nine Inch Nails. The gospel song "Crying in the Chapel" had been recorded during the sessions for His Hand in Mine, this five-year-old track going to number three and selling a million copies as a single in 1965.

== Track listing ==
Chart positions for singles taken from Billboard Pop Singles chart.

=== Original release ===
Side one
No.
Z
Title
Writer(s)
Recording date
Catalogue
Released
Chart peak
Time
1.

"Love Letters"
- Edward Heyman
- Victor Young
May 26, 1966
47−8870
June 8, 1966
19
2:30
2.

"Witchcraft"
- Dave Bartholomew
- Pearl King
May 26, 1963
47−8243b
October 1, 1963
32
2:19
3.

"It Hurts Me"
- Joy Byers
- Charlie Daniels
January 12, 1964
47−8307b
February 10, 1964
29
2:27
4.

"What'd I Say"
Ray Charles
August 30, 1963
47−8360
April 28, 1964
21
3:02
5.

"Please Don't Drag That String Around"
- Otis Blackwell
- Winfield Scott
May 26, 1963
47−8188b
June 18, 1963
−
1:54
6.

"Indescribably Blue"
Darrell Glenn
June 10, 1966
47−9056
January 10, 1967
33
2:48
Side two
No.

Title
Writer(s)
Recording date
Catalogue
Released
Chart peak
Time
1.

"(You're the) Devil in Disguise"
- Bernie Baum
- Bill Giant
- Florence Kaye
May 26, 1963
47−8188
June 18, 1963
3
2:20
2.

"Lonely Man"
- Bennie Benjamin
- Sol Marcus
November 7, 1960
47−7850b
February 7, 1961
32
2:43
3.

"A Mess of Blues"
- Doc Pomus
- Mort Shuman
March 20, 1960
47−7777b
July 5, 1960
32
2:39
4.

"Ask Me"
- Domenico Modugno
- Bernie Baum
- Bill Giant
- Florence Kaye
January 12, 1964
47−8840
September 22, 1964
12
2:07
5.

"Ain't That Loving You Baby"
- Clyde Otis
- Ivory Joe Hunter
June 10, 1958
47−8840b
September 22, 1964
16
2:22
6.

"Just Tell Her Jim Said Hello"
- Jerry Leiber
- Mike Stoller
March 19, 1962
47−8041b
July 17, 1962
55
1:52

=== 1997 Reissue with Bonus Tracks ===
No.

Title
Writer(s)
Recorded
Catalogue
Release date
Chart peak
Time
1.

"Return to Sender"
- Otis Blackwell
- Winfield Scott
March 27, 1962
47−8100
October 2, 1962
2
2:06
2.

"Rock−a−Hula Baby"
- Fred Wise
- Ben Weisman
- Dolores Fuller
March 23, 1961
47−7968b
November 22, 1961
23
1:57
3.

"Love Letters"
- Edward Heyman
- Victor Young
May 26, 1966
47−8870
June 8, 1966
19
2:30
4.

"Bossa Nova Baby"
- Jerry Leiber
- Mike Stoller
January 22, 1963
47−8243
October 1, 1963
8
2:02
5.

"Witchcraft"
- Dave Bartholomew
- Pearl King
May 26, 1963
47−8243b
October 1, 1963
32
2:19
6.

"Kissin' Cousins"
- Fred Wise
- Randy Starr
September 30, 1963
47−8307
February 10, 1964
12
2:12
7.

"It Hurts Me"
- Joy Byers
- Charlie Daniels
January 12, 1964
47−8307b
February 10, 1964
29
2:27
8.

"Viva Las Vegas"
- Doc Pomus
- Mort Shuman
July 10, 1963
47−8360b
April 28, 1964
29
2:21
9.

"What'd I Say"
Ray Charles
August 30, 1963
47−8360
April 28, 1964
21
3:02
10.

"Please Don't Drag That String Around"
- Otis Blackwell
- Winfield Scott
May 26, 1963
47−8188b
June 18, 1963
−
1:54
11.

"Indescribably Blue"
Darrell Glenn
June 10, 1966
47−9056
January 10, 1967
33
2:48
12.

"(You're the) Devil in Disguise"
- Bernie Baum
- Bill Giant
- Florence Kaye
May 26, 1963
47−8188
June 18, 1963
3
2:20
13.

"Lonely Man"
- Bennie Benjamin
- Sol Marcus
November 7, 1960
47−7850b
February 7, 1961
32
2:43
14.

"A Mess of Blues"
- Doc Pomus
- Mort Shuman
March 20, 1960
47−7777b
July 5, 1960
32
2:39
15.

"Ask Me"
- Domenico Modugno
- Bernie Baum
- Bill Giant
- Florence Kaye
January 12, 1964
47−8840
September 22, 1964
12
2:07
16.

"Ain't That Loving You Baby"
- Clyde Otis
- Ivory Joe Hunter
1958
47−8840b
September 22, 1964
16
2:22
17.

"Just Tell Her Jim Said Hello"
- Jerry Leiber
- Mike Stoller
March 19, 1962
47−8041b
July 7, 1962
55
1:52
18.

"Crying In The Chapel"
Artie Glenn
October 31, 1960
47−0643
April 6, 1965
3
2:24

== Personnel ==
- Elvis Presley − vocals; guitar on "Lonely Man," "A Mess of Blues," and "Ain't That Lovin' You Baby"
- Scotty Moore – rhythm guitar except "What'd I Say," "A Mess of Blues," and "Ain't That Lovin' You Baby," lead guitar on "A Mess of Blues"
- Hank Garland − lead guitar on "Ain't That Lovin' You Baby", bass on "A Mess of Blues"
  (Note: also lead guitar on 1997 bonus track "Crying in the Chapel")
- Barney Kessell − guitar (Note: only on 1997 bonus track "Return to Sender")
- Chet Atkins − guitar on "Ain't That Lovin' You Baby"
- Billy Strange − lead guitar
  (Note: also lead guitar on 1997 bonus track "Viva Las Vegas")
- Glen Campbell − guitar on "What'd I Say"
- Tiny Timbrell − guitar
- Chip Young − guitar on "Indescribably Blue" and "Love Letters"
- Harold Bradley − acoustic lead guitar on "Indescribably Blue", guitar on "Please Don't Drag That String Around," tic-tac bass guitar on "(You're the) Devil in Disguise"
- Grady Martin − lead guitar on "Please Don't Drag That String Around" and "(You're the) Devil in Disguise"
- Pete Drake − steel guitar on "Indescribably Blue"
- Floyd Cramer − piano, organ
- Dudley Brooks − piano
- David Briggs − piano
- Artie Kane − piano on "What'd I Say"
- Calvin Jackson − organ
- Henry Slaughter − organ
- Bob Moore − bass
- Ray Siegel − bass
- Meyer Rubin − bass
- D. J. Fontana − drums
- Buddy Harman – drums, timpani
- Hal Blaine − drums
- Frank Carlson − drums
- Boots Randolph − saxophone
- Rufus Long − saxophone
- Steve Douglas − saxophone on "What'd I Say"
- The Jordanaires − backing vocals
- Millie Kirkham − backing vocals
- Dolores Edgin − backing vocals
- June Page − backing vocals

== Charts ==
=== Album ===
Year	Chart	Position
1968	Billboard Pop Albums	33

=== Certifications and sales ===
Region	Certification	Certified units/sales
United States (RIAA)	Gold	500,000^{^}
^{^} Shipments figures based on certification alone.
