= Never Ending (Elvis Presley song) =

1964 song by Elvis Presley

Single by Elvis Presley

from the album Double Trouble
- A-side: "Such a Night"; "Never Ending"
- Released: July 14, 1964
- Recorded: May 26, 1963
- Genre: Rock and Roll, pop
- Length: 1:57
- Label: RCA Victor
- Songwriters: Buddy Kaye; Philip Springer

Elvis Presley singles chronology
"What'd I Say" / "Viva Las Vegas" (1964)	"Such a Night" / "Never Ending" (1964)	"Ask Me" / "Ain't That Loving You Baby" (1964)

"Never Ending" is a song originally recorded by Elvis Presley and released as a single in 1964.

== Background ==
Elvis Presley recorded it in May 1963 and first released it in July 1964 on the RCA 45 rpm single 47-8400 with "Such a Night" on the other side. In 1967, the song was included as a bonus track on Presley's soundtrack LP Double Trouble.

== Writing and recording ==
The song was written by Buddy Kaye and Philip Springer. It was published by Elvis Presley's company, Gladys Music, Inc.

Presley recorded it on May 26, 1963, during the May 26–27 studio sessions for RCA at RCA's Studio B in Nashville, Tennessee.

== Track listing ==
7" single

1. "Such a Night" (2:57)
2. "Never Ending" (1:58)

== Charts ==
Chart (1964)	Peak position
U.S. Billboard Bubbling Under the Hot 100	111
