= Clambake (soundtrack) =

Soundtrack album by Elvis Presley
- Released: October 10, 1967
- Recorded: February 21–23 and September 10–11, 1967
- Studio: RCA Studio B (Nashville)
- Genres: Rock, pop, country
- Length: 29:36
- Label: RCA Victor
- Producers: Jeff Alexander, Felton Jarvis

Elvis Presley chronology
Double Trouble (1967)	Clambake (1967)	Elvis' Gold Records Volume 4 (1968)

Singles from Clambake
- 1. "Big Boss Man" Released: September 1967; 2. "Guitar Man" Released: January 3, 1968

Professional ratings
Review scores
Source	Rating
Allmusic	3/5 stars

Clambake is the sixteenth soundtrack album by American singer and musician Elvis Presley, released by RCA Victor in mono and stereo, LPM/LSP 3893, in October 1967. It is the soundtrack to the 1967 film of the same name starring Presley. He entered RCA Studio B in Nashville, Tennessee on February 21, 1967, for recording sessions for his twenty-fifth film. Supplemental material sessions took place on September 10 and 11, 1967. It peaked at number 40 on the Billboard 200.

== Content ==
By the end of 1966, Presley no longer commanded the same level of sales or artistic respect as he had during the first ten years of his career. But Elvis had little enthusiasm at this juncture for more soundtrack sessions, the project already in jeopardy before it started. The sessions turned out a fiasco; of the eight songs recorded, two had been edited out of the film, and even with "How Can You Lose What You Never Had" restored to the soundtrack, that left an album of merely seven songs.

The album would prove to be a turning point in Presley's career. After many years of churning out forgettable songs for forgettable films, he was clearly past his prime. All realms of popular music had totally bypassed him during the 1960s while he had been "lost in Hollywood". So Presley decided to begin recording music written by accomplished songwriters. A session to record additional material in Hollywood was cancelled in August, rescheduled at RCA Studio B in September. Disregarding publishing control, Presley picked songs that appealed to him personally, including Eddy Arnold's country and western hit of 1956 "You Don't Know Me" and Jimmy Reed's 1960 rhythm and blues hit, "Big Boss Man". Both selections were issued as a single at the end of September before being added to the album, the A-side just barely making the Top 40. Presley also requested a song he had heard on the radio in Los Angeles by Jerry Reed, inviting Reed himself to duplicate the distinctive acoustic guitar part. They rousted Reed from a fishing-trip, who arrived to play on Presley's version of his own composition, "Guitar Man". After it was recorded, Reed refused to turn over the usual publishing percentages to Freddy Bienstock, another assault on the soundtrack formula that had been in place throughout the decade. Five songs were selected from this session to bring the album up to a total of twelve tracks.

Including this LP, of his fifteen albums since Pot Luck with Elvis in 1962, only three had not been film soundtracks: one (Elvis' Golden Records Volume 3) was a compilation of hit singles, another (Elvis for Everyone) a compilation of leftovers from a ten-year span of recording sessions, and the third being a bona fide studio album, the gospel How Great Thou Art. Even with the five recent non-movie songs, including a hit single, Clambake sold less than 200,000 copies, faring worse than its predecessor Double Trouble which had been his lowest-charting album so far.

== Reissues ==
In 1989, RCA Special Products issued tracks from the soundtracks of Clambake and Speedway on a single compact disc. In 1994, RCA reissued the Clambake album, coupled with the soundtrack for Kissin' Cousins plus tracks from Stay Away, Joe on a "Double Feature" CD. In 2006, Clambake was reissued on CD on the Follow That Dream label in a special edition that contained the original album tracks along with numerous alternate takes. RCA/Sony reissued the original 12 track Clambake soundtrack album on CD in 2009.

== Track listing ==
=== Original release ===
Side one
No.	Title	Writer(s)	Recording date	Length
1.	"Guitar Man" (bonus song)	Jerry Reed	September 10, 1967	2:30
2.	"Clambake"	Ben Weisman and Sid Wayne	February 22, 1967	2:36
3.	"Who Needs Money"	Randy Starr	February 22, 1967	3:15
4.	"A House That Has Everything"	Roy C. Bennett and Sid Tepper	February 21, 1967	2:14
5.	"Confidence"	Roy C. Bennett and Sid Tepper	February 22, 1967	2:33
6.	"Hey, Hey, Hey"	Joy Byers	February 22, 1967	2:30

Side two
No.	Title	Writer(s)	Recording date	Length
1.	"You Don't Know Me"	Cindy Walker and Eddy Arnold	September 11, 1967	2:27
2.	"The Girl I Never Loved"	Randy Starr	February 21, 1967	1:52
3.	"How Can You Lose What You Never Had?" (bonus track)	Ben Weisman and Sid Wayne	February 21, 1967	2:27
4.	"Big Boss Man" (bonus track)	Luther Dixon and Al Smith	September 10, 1967	2:50
5.	"Singing Tree" (bonus track)	A. L. Owens and A.C. Solberg	September 11, 1967	2:17
6.	"Just Call Me Lonesome" (bonus track)	Rex Griffin	September 10, 1967	2:05

=== 2006 Follow That Dream reissue ===
Original album
No.	Title	Length
1.	"Guitar Man" (bonus track)	2:19
2.	"Clambake"	2:35
3.	"Who Needs Money?"	3:15
4.	"A House That Has Everything"	2:13
5.	"Confidence"	2:32
6.	"Hey, Hey, Hey"	2:29
7.	"You Don't Know Me"	2:29
8.	"The Girl I Never Loved"	1:51
9.	"How Can You Lose What You Never Had" (bonus track)	2:26
10.	"Big Boss Man" (bonus track)	2:51
11.	"Singing Tree" (bonus track)	2:17
12.	"Just Call Me Lonesome" (bonus track)	2:06

Additional movie masters
No.	Title	Length
13.	"You Don't Know Me" (film version – take 20)	2:19
14.	"Clambake" (reprise – take 4)	0:21

Outtakes
No.	Title	Length
15.	"Clambake" (take 3B)	2:42
16.	"How Can You Lose What You Never Had" (takes 1 & 2)	4:16
17.	"You Don't Know Me" (film version – take 3)	2:42
18.	"Hey, Hey, Hey" (takes 3, 5 & 6)	5:05
19.	"The Girl I Never Loved" (takes 4 & 5)	3:33
20.	"Clambake" (takes 1 & 5)	3:26
21.	"A House That Has Everything" (takes 4, 5 & 6)	4:00
22.	"You Don't Know Me" (film version – takes 7 & 10)	3:15
23.	"How Can You Lose What You Never Had" (take 3)	2:37
24.	"Hey, Hey, Hey" (takes 7 & 8)	4:13
25.	"Clambake" (reprise – takes 1, 2 & 3)	2:48
Total length:		1:10:40

=== 2016 The RCA Albums Collection reissue ===
No.	Title	Length
1.	"Guitar Man" (bonus track)	2:19
2.	"Clambake"	2:35
3.	"Who Needs Money?"	3:15
4.	"A House That Has Everything"	2:13
5.	"Confidence"	2:32
6.	"Hey, Hey, Hey"	2:29
7.	"You Don't Know Me"	2:29
8.	"The Girl I Never Loved"	1:51
9.	"How Can You Lose What You Never Had" (bonus track)	2:26
10.	"Big Boss Man" (bonus track)	2:51
11.	"Singing Tree" (bonus track)	2:17
12.	"Just Call Me Lonesome" (bonus track)	2:06
13.	"Hi-Heel Sneakers" (bonus track)	2:47

== Personnel ==
- Elvis Presley − vocals
- The Jordanaires − backing vocals
- Millie Kirkham − backing vocals
- Dolores Edgin − backing vocals
- June Page − backing vocals
- Priscilla Hubbard − backing vocals
- Boots Randolph − saxophone
- Norm Ray − saxophone
- Pete Drake − pedal steel guitar
- Scotty Moore − rhythm guitar
- Chip Young − lead guitar, rhythm guitar on "Guitar Man" and "Big Boss Man"
- Jerry Reed − acoustic lead guitar on "Guitar Man" and "Big Boss Man"
- Charlie McCoy − organ, harmonica
- Floyd Cramer − piano, organ
- Hoyt Hawkins − piano, organ
- Bob Moore − double bass
- D. J. Fontana − drums
- Buddy Harman − drums

== Charts ==
Year	Chart	Position
1967	Billboard Pop Albums	40
