= Cedric Killings =

American football player (1977–2023)

No. 71, 91, 78, 97
- Position: Defensive tackle

Personal information
- Born: December 14, 1977; Miami, Florida, U.S.
- Died: June 21, 2023 (aged 45)
- Listed height: 6 ft 3 in (1.91 m)
- Listed weight: 310 lb (141 kg)

Career information
- High school: Miami Central Senior (FL)
- College: Carson–Newman
- NFL draft: 2000: undrafted

Career history
- San Francisco 49ers (2000); Cleveland Browns (2001); Carolina Panthers (2001); Minnesota Vikings (2002–2003); → Rhein Fire (2004); Washington Redskins (2004–2005); Houston Texans (2006–2007)

Awards and highlights
- 4× NCAA Division II All-American (1996–1999)

Career NFL statistics
- Games played: 34
- Total tackles: 41
- Sacks: 3
- Stats at Pro Football Reference

Cedric Laquon Killings (December 14, 1977 – June 21, 2023) was an American professional football player who was a defensive tackle in the National Football League (NFL). He was originally signed by the San Francisco 49ers as an undrafted free agent in 2000. He played college football at Carson–Newman University.

In his eight-year career, Killings played for the 49ers, Cleveland Browns, Carolina Panthers, Minnesota Vikings, Washington Redskins and the Houston Texans. He retired following the 2007 NFL season after suffering a fractured vertebra with the Texans.

== Early life ==
Killings was an All-Dade and All-State performer as a senior at Miami Central High School and also earned All-Dade and All-State honors in the discus and shot put.

== Professional career ==
Killings was signed as an undrafted free agent by San Francisco 49ers on April 27, 2000. He was released by the 49ers on August 29, 2001. He was signed by Cleveland Browns on October 16, 2001, but released by the Browns on November 7, 2001. He was signed by the Carolina Panthers on November 28, 2001, and granted free agency on March 1, 2002. Killings was signed by the Minnesota Vikings on June 20, 2002, and released by the Vikings on September 1, 2002. He was re-signed by Vikings on October 29, 2002, and released by Vikings on December 10, 2002. He was re-signed by the Vikings on December 16, 2002.

Killings was on the 53-man roster for the Vikings for 14 games in 2003, but was inactive.

Killings signed with the Washington Redskins and was assigned to Rhein Fire in the 2004 NFL Europe enhancement allocation program on February 9, 2004. He was assigned #78 during the 2004 pre-season. He was released by the Redskins on September 5, 2004.

The Washington Redskins re-signed Killings for depth on Dec. 8, 2004, when the team placed defensive end Phillip Daniels on injured reserve. Although Killings was on the 53-man roster and was assigned #91, he was not activated for any of the remaining four games.

Killings was granted unconditional free agency on March 2, 2005, and re-signed by Redskins on March 8, 2005.

In 2005, Killings played in ten regular season games with the Washington Redskins, and started in one. In addition, he played in two playoff games.

Killings was granted unconditional free agency on March 11, 2006, and re-signed by the Redskins on March 16, 2006. He was released by the Redskins on September 2, 2006, and signed by Houston Texans on November 14, 2006. He was released by Texans on Sept. 1, 2007 and re-signed by Texans on Sept. 14, 2007.

Killings was placed on the reserve/injured list on Sept. 25, 2007 with a neck injury.

== Career-ending injury ==
Killings was involved in a head-to-head collision by Roy Hall during the second quarter of a game against the Indianapolis Colts on September 23, 2007, and had to be taken off the field in a stretcher. Trainers said he was complaining of numbness in his lower extremities, and was unable to move them. He had suffered a fractured vertebra. He also sustained a deep cut under his right eye. A Houston Methodist Hospital spokesperson said that Killings could move all of his extremities but was complaining of numbness coming and going in his lower back area.

== NFL rule change ==
The Texans' Harry Williams, a receiver, and Cedric Killings, a defensive lineman, both saw their careers end in sudden, frightening fashion because of wedge-related neck injuries during the 2007 season.

The NFL's rules were subsequently changed. They now state that once the ball has been kicked, no more than two receiving team players can be within 2 yards of each other on the same yard line, or to quote Texans special teams coach Joe Marciano, "shoulder pad to shoulder pad."

"Everybody else has to be 3 yards away," Marciano said. "So we're telling our guys 4 yards to stay out of any gray area. The penalty is just too severe to take chances."

Violation of this rule will result in a 15-yard penalty for unsportsmanlike conduct.

== Personal life and death ==
Killings and his wife, Shavon, had three children.

Killings died of pancreatic cancer on June 21, 2023, at the age of 45.
