= Ain't That Lovin' You, Baby =

"Ain't That Loving You Baby"
- "Ain't That Loving You Baby" single

Single by Elvis Presley
- B-side: "Ask Me"
- Released: September 22, 1964
- Recorded: June 10, 1958
- Genre: Rock and roll
- Length: 2:20
- Label: RCA Victor
- Songwriters: Clyde Otis and Ivory Joe Hunter

Elvis Presley singles chronology
"Such a Night" / "Never Ending" (1964)	"Ain't That Loving You Baby" / "Ask Me" (1964)	"Blue Christmas" (1964)

Not to be confused with Ain't That Lovin' You, Baby (Jimmy Reed song)

"Ain't That Loving You, Baby" is a song written by Clyde Otis and Ivory Joe Hunter and originally recorded by Eddie Riff in 1956. Elvis Presley recorded the song in 1958 and released the song as a single in 1964.

== Background ==
The song was recorded by Elvis Presley on June 10, 1958, but wasn't released as a single until September 1964 (with no comma in the title) when it reached number 16 on the Billboard chart, with "Ask Me" as the flipside. It is a standard shuffle in E major. The song, along with "Ask Me", was later included on the 1968 compilation album Elvis' Gold Records Volume 4, and an alternate take with a faster tempo was released in 1985 on the compilation album Reconsider Baby.

== Personnel ==
- Elvis Presley – lead vocals
- Hank Garland – lead guitar
- Bob Moore – double bass
- Floyd Cramer – piano
- D. J. Fontana, Buddy Harman – drums
