= Gantry (musical) =

- Original Broadway playbill
- Music: Stanley Lebowsky
- Lyrics: Fred Tobias
- Book: Peter Bellwood
- Basis: Elmer Gantry by Sinclair Lewis
- Productions: 1970 Broadway

Gantry is a musical with a book by Peter Bellwood, lyrics by Fred Tobias, and music by Stanley Lebowsky.

Based on the 1927 novel Elmer Gantry by Sinclair Lewis, it tells the story of a womanizing, self-righteous, self-proclaimed preacher who joins forces with a female evangelist to sell religion to small-town Americans.

After 31 previews, the Broadway production, directed and choreographed by Onna White, opened on February 14, 1970 at the George Abbott Theatre, where it closed after one performance. The cast included Robert Shaw, Rita Moreno, Ted Thurston, and Beth Fowler.

== Song list ==
Act I

- Wave a Hand
- He Was There
- Play Ball with the Lord
- Katie Jonas
- Thanks, Sweet Jesus!
- Someone I've Already Found
- He's Never Too Busy
- We're Sharin' Sharon

Act II

- We Can All Give Love
- Foresight
- These Four Walls
- Show Him the Way
- The Promise of What I Could Be
- Gantry's Reaction
- We're Sharin' Sharon (Reprise)
