= Ask Me (Elvis Presley song) =

1964 single by Elvis Presley

Single by Elvis Presley
- A-side: "Ain't That Loving You Baby"
- Released: September 22, 1964
- Genre: Rock and Roll, Pop
- Length: 2:07
- Label: RCA Victor
- Songwriters: Domenico Modugno; Bernie Baum; Bill Giant; Florence Kaye
- Producer: Elvis Presley

Elvis Presley singles chronology
"Such a Night" / "Never Ending" (1964)	"Ask Me" / "Ain't That Loving You Baby'" (1964)	"Blue Christmas" (1964)

"Ask Me" is a 1964 song recorded by Elvis Presley. It is an English-language cover version of the Italian song "Io" by Domenico Modugno. In 1964 Elvis Presley released his version on a single with "Ain't That Loving You Baby" on the other side. The recording appeared on the 1968 RCA Victor compilation Elvis' Gold Records Volume 4.

== Writing and recording history ==
The song is credited to Domenico Modugno (the author of the original), Bernie Baum, Bill Giant and Florence Kaye.

== Track listing ==
7" single

1. "Ain't That Loving You Baby" (2:20) – Elvis Presley
2. "Ask Me" (2:07) – Elvis Presley with The Jordanaires

== Charts ==
Chart (1964)	Peak position
Belgium (Ultratop 50 Wallonia)	14
U.S. Billboard Hot 100	12
"Ain't That Loving You Baby / Ask Me"
Australia (retrospect Kent Music Report)	1 (3)
