= There Is So Much World to See =

Song by Elvis Presley

from the album Double Trouble
- Recorded: June 28, 1966
- Label: RCA Victor
- Songwriter: Randy Starr
- Producer: Jeffrey Alexander

"There Is So Much World to See" is a film song by Elvis Presley. It was featured in the Metro-Goldwyn-Mayer motion picture Double Trouble (1967). Elvis performs "There Is So Much World to See" to Jill Conway (Annette Day), while she is sitting on the bed.

Presley recorded the song on June 28, 1966, at Radio Recorders, Hollywood. It was released on the soundtrack album Double Trouble (RCA Victor LPM 3787 (mono) and RCA Victor LSP 3787 (stereo)) in 1967. MGM producer was Jeffrey Alexander.

Sue Moreno has also recorded a version. It was released on the album Bye Bye Blues (Jungle Records TCB-3131CD) in 2005.
