= South Euclid–Lyndhurst City School District =

School district in Ohio, United States

Address
- 5044 Mayfield Road Lyndhurst, Ohio, 44124; United States

District information
- Type: Public
- Grades: PK–12
- Established: 1924; 102 years ago
- Superintendent: Dominick A. Kaple
- Schools: 6
- NCES District ID: 3904479

Students and staff
- Students: 3,203 (2024–2025)
- Teachers: 192.17 (on an FTE basis) (2024–2025)
- Staff: 602.81 (on an FTE basis) (2024–2025)
- Student–teacher ratio: 16.67 (2024–2025)

Other information
- Website: www.selschools.org

The South Euclid–Lyndhurst City School District is a public school district in eastern Cuyahoga County, Ohio, that serves the cities of South Euclid and Lyndhurst. The district is overseen by a board of education which consists of five elected members, advised by the superintendent and treasurer of the district. The board sets the policy for the schools and ensures the implementation of that policy.

== Schools ==
- Charles F. Brush High School (Grades 9-12)
- Memorial Junior High School (Grades 7-8)
- Greenview Upper Elementary School (Grades 4-6)
- Adrian Elementary School (Grades K-3)
- Rowland Elementary School (Grades K-3)
- Sunview Elementary School (Grades K-3)

== Former Schools ==
Listed in order of closure, with date of final school year in parentheses.

- Little Red School House (renamed Euclidville Village School in 1917) (1924)
- South Euclid High School (1926)
- Richmond Road School-Elementary (1973)- Now houses Board of Education offices
- Anderson Elementary School (1982)
- Victory Park Elementary School (1982)
- Greenview Junior High School (1982. Re-opened in 1990 as an upper Elementary campus)
- Bolton Elementary School (1983)
- Lowden Elementary School (2007)
- Ridgebury Elementary School (2007)
- Southlyn Elementary School (2007)

== South Euclid-Lyndhurst Schools Timeline ==
- 1809 - Euclid township is incorporated.
- 1828 - Euclid Township is divided into nine districts. South Euclid is number seven.
- 1843 - Land is purchased by the Board of Education at the Intersection of Mayfield and Richmond Roads.
- 1845 - In District 2 the Green Road school is built at the intersection of Green and Mayfield.
- 1866 - the Little Red School House opens in District 4.
- 1876 - A one-room school house is built at the corner of Bluestone and Green Roads.
- 1900 - Euclid Township boasts having eleven one room schools.
- 1903 - Three years later Euclid Village is incorporated.
- 1912 - The first high school is built on Green Road, north of Mayfield Road (current location of the Key Bank Parking lot).
- 1913 - George H. Knappenberger is named superintendent of schools.
- 1916 - The first Class graduates from South Euclid High School.
- 1917 - South Euclid village is incorporated and the Little Red Schoolhouse closed, re-opened as Euclidville Village School.
- 1918 - Richmond Road School opens as Euclid Village School.
- 1920 - O.J. Korb replaces Knappenberger as Superintendent, Victory Park School is built, and Euclidville is renamed Lyndhurst.
- 1924 - The Little Red School House/Euclidville School building is moved 100 yards south. Richmond Road Elementary School opens at the intersection of Mayfield and Richmond. South Euclid-Lyndhurst school district is created.
- 1927 - Brush High School opens, serving both South Euclid and Lyndhurst, and replacing South Euclid High School.
- 1929 - Parts of Richmond Heights are included in the merger of districts.C.R. Dustin replaces Korb as Superintendent.
- 1949 - Memorial Junior High and Rowland Elementary are built.
- 1950 - Bolton Elementary is built.
- 1952 - Anderson Elementary is built.
- 1953 - Adrian Elementary is built and Robert Timmons is named Superintendent.
- 1954 - Lowden and Sunview Elementary are built.
- 1955 - Southlyn Elementary is built.
- 1958 - Alan Shankland becomes Superintendent. Greenview Junior High opens.
- 1959 - Ridgebury Elementary is built.
- 1960 - First foreign language lab is established at Brush.
- 1966 - Vocational programs begin at Brush. Dr. Marvin Maire becomes Superintendent.
- 1970 - First decline posted in school district's enrollment.
- 1972 - Richmond Road School closes.
- 1976 - Bruce Holderbaum becomes Superintendent.
- 1978 - Dr. Henry Kurdziel becomes Superintendent. All buildings are renovated to be handicapped accessible.
- 1980 - a five-year plan to downsize and consolidate is outlined.
- 1981 - School board administrative offices are moved to former Richmond Road School building.
- 1982 - Anderson and Victory Park Elementary, Greenview Junior High all close.
- 1983 - Bolton School closes. Victory Park School building and property is sold to Acme Grocery.
- 1984 - Anderson, Bolton and Greenview buildings are leased to private education entities.
- 1986 - Dr. Lawrence L. Marazza becomes Superintendent.
- 1989 - School district posts first enrollment increase in 20 years.
- 1990 - Greenview re-opens as an upper elementary school, serving grades 5 & 6.
- 1993 - Project Lite is created.
- 1998 - Dr. William Zelei becomes Superintendent. Memorial Junior High celebrates its 50th anniversary. Contract is awarded for Korb Field renovation Project at Brush.
- 1999 - Korb Field Project begins.
- 2002 - Brush High School celebrates its 75th anniversary.
- 2003 - School district launches the community TV channel 22, operated by AV/TV at Brush High School
- 2005 - Congresswoman Stephanie Tubbs-Jones visits Brush High School (May 2) and addresses student body.
- 2006 - Second consolidation plan begins.
- 2007 - Former Anderson Elementary building demolished and converted to athletic fields.
- 2007 - Lowden, Ridgebury and Southlyn Elementary Close. Adrian, Rowland, and Sunview re-formatted as K-3 schools. Rowland serving as new home for Preschool.
- 2008 - Former First lady and 2008 Presidential Candidate Hillary Clinton visits Brush High School for February 15 rally. Ridgebury closes as a 4th grade school. Greenview opens new 4th grade wing. Memorial opens with a new gym.
- 2009 Brush High School Library opens Cyber Cafe. Former Bolton and Lowden Elementary campuses demolished and converted to green space.
- 2012 Linda Reid becomes Superintendent, replacing Dr. William Zelei, who resigned last November to take a position with the Ohio Department of Education.

== Performance ==
For the school year 2007-08, the District was designated as Effective. It met 20 of the 30 State indicators and achieved a Performance Index Score of 93.4, on a scale of 0-120.

For the school year 2010, the District was downgraded to the designation of "Continuous Improvement". It met 16 of the 26 State indicators and achieved a Performance Index Score of 92.3.

== Funding ==
The District's funding bonds, issued in 2006 and 2007, were given A1 ratings by Moody's Investor Services.
