= Born Too Late (song) =

1958 single by the Poni-Tails

Single by The Poni-Tails
- B-side: "Come On Joey Dance with Me"
- Released: June 23, 1958
- Genre: Pop
- Length: 2:17
- Label: ABC-Paramount 9934
- Songwriters: Charles Strouse, Fred Tobias

The Poni-Tails singles chronology
"It's Just My Luck to Be Fifteen" (1957)	"Born Too Late" (1958)	"Seven Minutes in Heaven" (1958)

Audio sample
- file; help

"Born Too Late" is a song written by Charles Strouse and Fred Tobias and performed by The Poni-Tails. In the UK, the song reached #5 on the UK Singles Chart. In the US, it reached #7 on the Billboard Hot 100 and #11 on the R&B chart in 1958.

The song was arranged by O.B. Masingill.

The record stands as the Cleveland girl group's only Top 40 hit, making them a definitive example of a 1950s one-hit wonder. It was originally released as the B-side to "Come On Joey Dance with Me," but radio DJs bucked expectations by playing "Born Too Late" instead, driving its success. Group member Patti McCabe noted its cultural resonance as a "message song" capturing the timeless, universal angst of a younger girl pinning for an older, unattainable guy.

== In media ==
The song was used in the 1973 movie, That'll Be the Day.
