= Tell Me Why (1956 song) =

Song written by Titus Turner

Single by Marie Knight
- B-side: "As Long As I Love"
- Released: 1956
- Recorded: 1955
- Genre: Rhythm and blues
- Length: 2:09
- Label: Wing
- Songwriter: Titus Turner

"Tell Me Why" is a popular song, written by Titus Turner in 1956. It is a slow, strong rhythm and blues ballad, and has a melody reminiscent of "Just a Closer Walk with Thee". The first hit version was by Marie Knight, a black R&B singer, on the Mercury's subsidiary label, Wing. It was a local hit in New Orleans and Texas.

== 1956 recordings ==
When the song attracted attention, it went on to become a moderate hit for Gale Storm and the Crew-Cuts in 1956

== Elvis Presley recording ==
"Tell Me Why"

Single by Elvis Presley
- B-side: "Blue River"
- Released: December 14, 1965
- Recorded: January 12, 1957
- Studio: Radio Recorders, Hollywood
- Genre: Rock and roll, pop
- Label: RCA Victor
- Songwriter: Titus Turner

Elvis Presley singles chronology
"Santa Claus Is Back in Town" (1965)	"Tell Me Why" (1965)	"Joshua Fit the Battle" (1966)

In 1966, "Tell Me Why" was a hit for Elvis Presley. Presley recorded the track in 1957, but it was not released at that time. It was issued in late 1965 during a period in which his label, RCA Victor, was issuing previously unreleased archival recordings, to make up for the fact Presley was, at the time, recording exclusively film soundtracks (see the 1965 album, Elvis for Everyone! which includes another 1957 outtake and one track dating back to 1954). It reached number 33 on the Billboard Hot 100 and became a gold record.

Billboard described Presley's version as a "slow blues rocker [that] is revived and released in the U.S. with top of the chart action anticipated", after being a "proven hit" in England. The track reached number 15 on the UK Singles Chart in December 1965.

=== Chart performance ===
Chart (1965–66)	Peak position
UK Singles (The Official Charts Company)	15
US Billboard Hot 100	33

Tell me Why
