= Stanley Lebowsky =

Stanley Lebowsky (/ləˈbaʊski/; November 26, 1926 – October 19, 1986) was a Hollywood and Broadway composer, lyricist, conductor and music director who conducted more than a dozen Broadway musicals including Chicago, Half a Sixpence, Irma La Douce, Jesus Christ Superstar, Pippin, The 1940's Radio Hour, and The Act. He was born in Minneapolis, Minnesota, and died at Mount Sinai West in Manhattan, survived by his wife Carol Estey.

Lebowsky was nominated for a Tony Award for Best Conductor and Musical Director in 1961 for Irma La Douce. In 1987 he was given a Drama Desk Special Award.

== Works ==
Musicals

- Gantry (1970) – composer

Songs

- "Take Off with Us" from All That Jazz (1979) and Fosse (1999)
- "The Wayward Wind" (1956)
