= The Poni-Tails =

American girl group

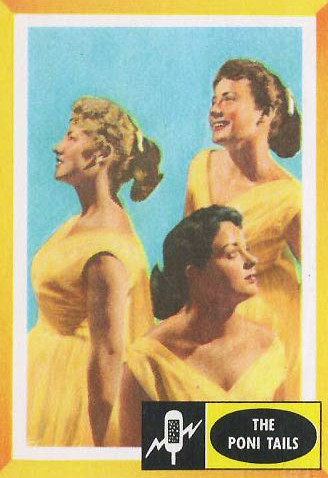
- The Poni-Tails in 1960

Background information
- Origin: Lyndhurst, Ohio, U.S.
- Genres: Pop music
- Years active: 1956–1960
- Labels: Point; Marc; ABC-Paramount
- Past members: Toni Cistone; Karen Topinka; Patti McCabe; LaVerne Novak

The Poni-Tails were an American musical trio formed in Lyndhurst, Ohio. They are known for their 1958 major hit "Born Too Late".

== History ==
Formed in a suburb of Cleveland, Ohio, the Poni-Tails – Toni Cistone, LaVerne Novak and Patti McCabe (Patricia Ann McCabe, 1939–1989) – started singing at Brush High School, which they all attended. Tom Ilius, a music publisher, had them signed to a local record label, Point Records, which released their first single, "Your Wild Heart" b/w "Que la Bozena" (the latter of which was written by the group). "Heart" was covered by the then-15-year-old Joy Layne and became a nationwide hit. The next release was "Can I Be Sure" on Marc Records, which was not a success; following this release Topinka left the group and was replaced by LaVerne Novak.

Soon after this, the group signed to ABC-Paramount and released "Just My Luck to Be Fifteen", a flop. Following this was "Come on Joey, Dance With Me" b/w "Born Too Late". The B-side was the one that caught the attention of radio DJs and became the group's biggest hit, reaching No. 11 on the U.S. R&B singles chart and No. 7 on the Billboard Hot 100 in 1958. Follow-ups "Seven Minutes In Heaven" (No. 85 Pop) and "I'll Be Seeing You" (No. 87 Pop) fared less well, and the group's last single, 1960's "Who, When And Why", did not chart.

ABC-Paramount attempted to sign the group to a further five-year contract, but they turned it down. The members left the music industry and pursued careers in other fields in Ohio. They reunited to play a Cleveland festival, Moon Dog Coronation ball, in 1997. A CD released by Poni Records with 12 tracks credited to the Poni-Tails contains only one Poni-Tails song ("Born Too Late") and 11 tracks recorded by other groups.

In 1991, LaVerne (Novak) Glavac was working for a real estate agent in Mentor, Ohio, and had five grandchildren. Toni (Cistone) Costabile was working at a high school in Shaker Heights, Ohio. Patti (McCabe) Barnes died of cancer on January 17, 1989. Tom Illius subsequently became a top executive with the William Morris Agency in Los Angeles. He died on September 7, 2011, in Los Angeles.

== Singles ==
Year	Title	Peak chart positions			Record Label	B-side
Year	Title	US	R&B	UK	Record Label	B-side
1957	"It's Just My Luck to Be Fifteen"	–	–	–	ABC-Paramount Records	"Wild Eyes and Tender Lips"
1958	"Born Too Late"	7	11	5	ABC-Paramount Records	"Come On Joey Dance with Me"
1958	"Seven Minutes in Heaven"	85	–	–	ABC-Paramount Records	"Close Friends"
1959	"Early to Bed"	–	–	26	ABC-Paramount Records	"Father Time"
1959	"Moody"	–	–	–	ABC-Paramount Records	"Omm Pah Polka"
1959	"I'll Be Seeing You"	87	–	–	ABC-Paramount Records	"I'll Keep Tryin'"
1960	"Come Be My Love"	–	–	–	ABC-Paramount Records	"Before We Say Goodnight"
1960	"Who, When, And Why"	–	–	–	ABC-Paramount Records	"Oh, My, You"

== Members ==
- Toni Cistone
- Karin Topinka (to 1958)
- LaVerne Novak (1958–1960)
- Patti McCabe
- Lorene Flowers
