= Chris Linn =

American magician, comedian, and entertainer

Chris Linn is an American magician, comedian, and entertainer.

In October 2005, Linn broke the Guinness World Record for the "most one fingered playing card scales in one minute". To break the record, Linn had to hold a deck of playing cards in one hand and use his thumb to propel ("scale") the cards from the deck a minimum distance of 12 feet. Linn was able to successfully scale 114 playing cards in one minute, beating the previous record of 104 playing cards set by magician Jeff McBride. The record breaking feat took place at Cedar Point Amusement Park in Sandusky, Ohio.

Chris Linn received another Guinness World Record in June 2007. This time it was for "mak[ing] a balloon dog with both hands behind the back in just 0.94 seconds".

In 2009, Chris released "Shenanigans with Chris Linn", a DVD that features live performance footage and magic trick tutorials.

== Awards ==
(2010) "Entertainer of the Year - Solo Act" - Spotlight Awards Las Vegas

== Personal life ==
Chris graduated from Oakland University in Rochester, Michigan with a degree in marketing.
