= Rick Smith Jr. =

American illusionist, card thrower (born 1981)

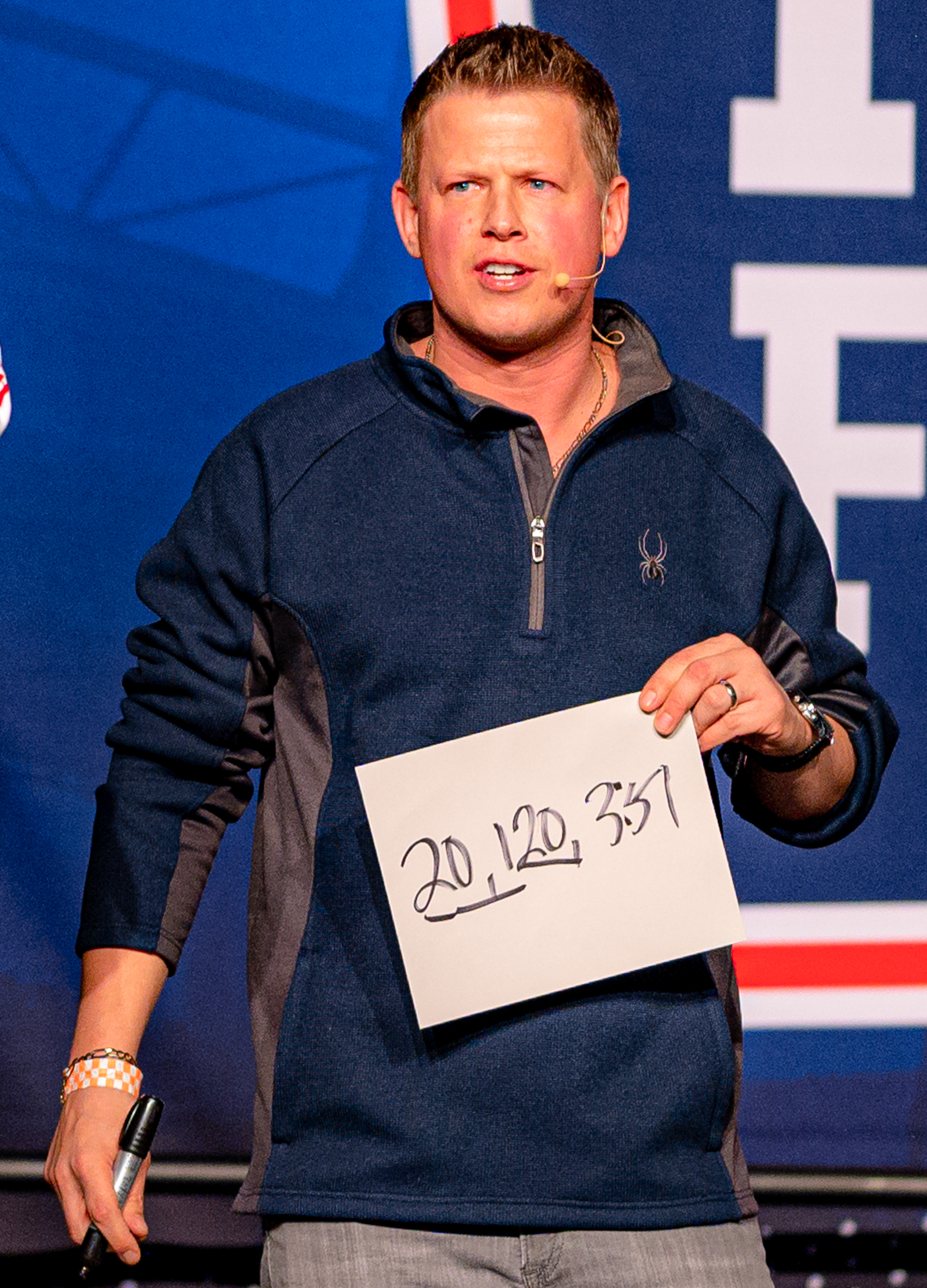
- Smith in 2020
- Born: March 5, 1981 (age 44); Lyndhurst, Ohio, U.S.
- Education: Cleveland State University
- Occupations: Illusionist; entertainer
- Years active: 2002–present
- Known for: Card throwing

YouTube information
- Channel: Rick Smith, Jr.
- Subscribers: 3.26 million
- Views: 2.14 billion
- Last updated: August 23, 2024

Rick Smith Jr. (born 5 March 1981) is an American professional illusionist and card thrower from Cleveland, Ohio. Having derived his throwing skills from his time as an NCAA Division I pitcher at Cleveland State University, Smith currently holds three world records: farthest throw of a playing card, highest throw of a playing card, and most playing cards consecutively thrown into a horizontal target. Smith has released a number of instructional films on card throwing and magic.

== Early life ==
Rick Smith Jr. was born and raised in Lyndhurst, Ohio, a suburb on the eastern side of the city of Cleveland. He attended the St. Clare School until eighth grade, then moved to Charles F. Brush High School, from which he graduated.

Smith began practicing magic at a young age, teaching himself tricks and buying props from the local magic store. He would perform for the residents of his neighborhood in his basement, eventually moving on to shows at local parties where he would charge a small fee for a stage performance.

After high school, Smith enrolled at Cleveland State University, where he studied marketing and business management and pitched on the school's baseball team.

== Career ==
While in college, Smith discovered an unnatural talent in card throwing after throwing a card at a friend in jest and accidentally cutting his friend's arm. Following this incident, Smith attempted to break the Guinness World Record for the farthest thrown playing card, accomplishing the feat on March 21, 2002 at the Wolstein Center.

After gaining local publicity for the feat, Smith was invited onto Ripley's Believe It or Not!, where he demonstrated his card throwing abilities. Subsequent television performances throughout Smith's career have included appearances on The Ellen DeGeneres Show, Shark Tank, The Tonight Show, and America's Got Talent. He has also appeared on the trick shot YouTube channel Dude Perfect, and the YouTube Red series The Super Slow Show.

Smith currently performs for individual clients as well as national corporations at events around the United States. His shows often include a combination of magic and card throwing stunts, many of which involve audience participation. Smith is also the founder and director of Magic Gives Back, an organization dedicated to raising money for school systems across the United States. Along with a group of performers, Smith organizes events in conjunction with school districts in order to raise money for education-related projects.

== World records ==
Smith currently holds three Guinness World Records for his work in card throwing:

- Farthest throw of a playing card – 65.96 meters (216 feet, 4 inches), achieved on March 21, 2002
- Highest throw of a playing card – 21.41 meters (70 feet, 3 inches), achieved on March 14, 2015
- Most playing cards consecutively thrown into a horizontal target – 139, achieved on October 17, 2022

== Filmography ==
Throughout his career, Smith has released a series of instructional movies aimed at audiences hoping to learn the basics of magic or card throwing. His releases include: Xtreme Beginnerz Card Handling Skills, which explains the basics of card throwing, pen spinning, and dice stacking; The Art of Card Throwing with Rick Smith Jr., which explains techniques for card throwing in greater detail; and Velocity (in collaboration with Murphy's Magic), which also launches into the specific practices and skills necessary to be a masterful card thrower.
