= Lyndhurst, Ohio =

- City
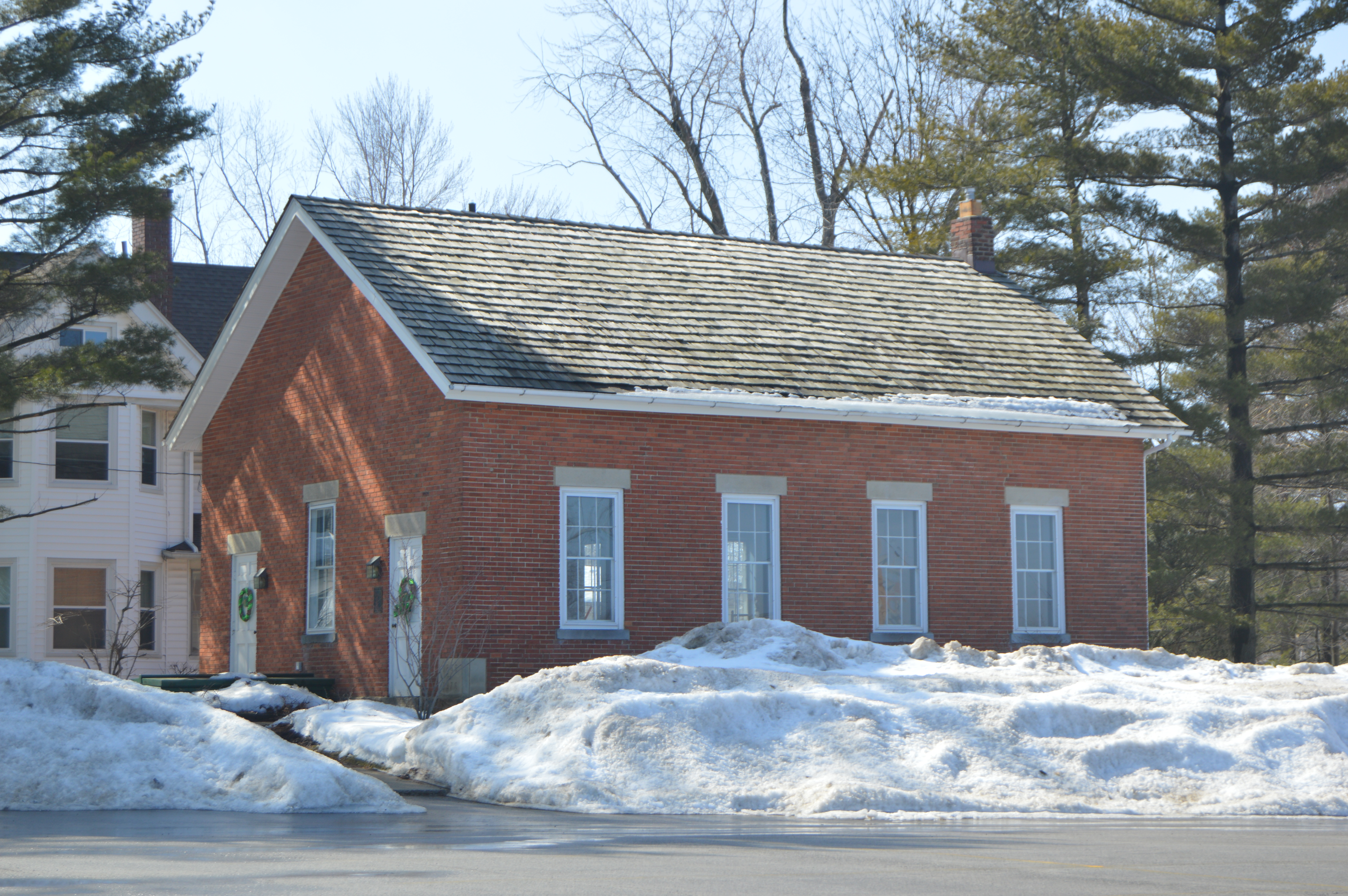
- Old Euclid District 4 Schoolhouse
- Motto: "A Community of Neighbors"
- Interactive map of Lyndhurst, Ohio
- Location within Ohio Location within the United States
- Coordinates: 41°31′2″N 81°29′25″W
- Country: United States
- State: Ohio
- County: Cuyahoga

Government
  - Mayor: Patrick Ward (R)

Area
  - Total: 4.44 sq mi (11.49 km^{2})
  - Land: 4.43 sq mi (11.48 km^{2})
  - Water: 0.0039 sq mi (0.01 km^{2})
- Elevation: 1,037 ft (316 m)

Population (2020)
  - Total: 14,050
  - Density: 3,170.0/sq mi (1,223.95/km^{2})
- Time zone: UTC-5 (Eastern (EST))
  - Summer (DST): UTC-4 (EDT)
- ZIP code: 44124
- Area codes: 216, 440
- FIPS code: 39-45556
- GNIS feature ID: 1085977
- Website: www.lyndhurstohio.gov

Lyndhurst is a city in Cuyahoga County, Ohio, United States, and an eastern suburb of Cleveland. The population was 14,050 at the 2020 census. A small part of Lyndhurst was originally part of Mayfield Township.

== History ==
The land currently comprising Lyndhurst was part of the Connecticut Western Reserve, obtained via treaty with the Iroquois tribe in 1796 by the Connecticut Land Company. In 1797, Moses Cleaveland named the area east of the Cuyahoga River "Euclid," after the Greek Mathematician and Patron Saint of surveyors. Euclid Township was officially formed in 1809. Despite this, Lyndhurst's population consisted mostly of Native American Indians until after the War of 1812.

In 1828 Euclid Township was divided into nine districts, with the present area of Lyndhurst becoming district four.

From 1877 the main traffic corridor has been Mayfield Road (U.S. Route 322). Initially a wood-planked toll road, it is now home to many retail establishments and restaurants.

The earliest industry was farming. As the area grew, it became known as Euclidville Village, the name changing to Lyndhurst Village in 1920 before Lyndhurst was formally incorporated as a city in 1921.

Population growth in Lyndhurst, which tapered during the Great Depression, skyrocketed during the postwar period, driven by both the baby boom and white flight from the urban center of Cleveland. Lyndhurst's population peaked in the 1970s. By 1980, lacking large tracts of available land for development, and with a population shift to exurban communities, the population of Lyndhurst began to shrink. The 2010, population of Lyndhurst was 29% less than its peak during the 1970s.

=== Eggshelland ===
Eggshelland is an annual lawn display of Easter egg mosaics, originally located at a resident's home between 1957 and 2013, during which time it became the subject of a documentary film. A different party took ownership of the maintenance of Eggshelland in 2014, relocating the display to various locations in and around Lyndhurst. In 2022 the display moved to nearby Chester Township.

== Geography ==
According to the United States Census Bureau, the city has a total area of 4.44 square miles (11.50 km^{2}), of which 4.43 square miles (11.47 km^{2}) is land and 0.01 square miles (0.03 km^{2}) is water.

== Demographics ==
Historical population
Census	Pop.	Note	%±
1920	288		—
1930	1,922		567.4%
1940	2,391		24.4%
1950	7,359		207.8%
1960	16,805		128.4%
1970	19,749		17.5%
1980	18,093		−8.4%
1990	15,982		−11.7%
2000	15,279		−4.4%
2010	14,001		−8.4%
2020	14,050		0.3%

The median income for a household in the city was $52,272, and the median income for a family was $64,961. Males had a median income of $45,172 versus $31,652 for females. The per capita income for the city was $28,206. About 1.3% of families and 2.5% of the population were below the poverty line, including 1.4% of those under age 18 and 3.3% of those age 65 or over.

Of the city's population over the age of 25, 43.2% held a bachelor's degree or higher.

=== Racial and ethnic composition ===
Lyndhurst city, Ohio – Racial and ethnic composition Note: the US Census treats Hispanic/Latino as an ethnic category. This table excludes Latinos from the racial categories and assigns them to a separate category. Hispanics/Latinos may be of any race.
Race / Ethnicity (NH = Non-Hispanic)	Pop 2000	Pop 2010	Pop 2020	% 2000	% 2010	% 2020
White alone (NH)	14,707	12,531	10,676	96.26%	89.50%	75.99%
Black or African American alone (NH)	196	894	2,061	1.28%	6.39%	14.67%
Native American or Alaska Native alone (NH)	1	5	8	0.01%	0.04%	0.06%
Asian alone (NH)	181	223	430	1.18%	1.59%	3.06%
Native Hawaiian or Pacific Islander alone (NH)	1	0	1	0.01%	0.00%	0.01%
Other race alone (NH)	9	13	72	0.06%	0.09%	0.51%
Mixed race or Multiracial (NH)	80	150	454	0.52%	1.07%	3.23%
Hispanic or Latino (any race)	104	185	348	0.68%	1.32%	2.48%
Total	15,279	14,001	14,050	100.00%	100.00%	100.00%

=== 2020 census ===
As of the 2020 census, Lyndhurst had a population of 14,050. The median age was 47.8 years. 15.4% of residents were under the age of 18 and 26.6% of residents were 65 years of age or older. For every 100 females there were 86.5 males, and for every 100 females age 18 and over there were 83.2 males age 18 and over.

100.0% of residents lived in urban areas, while 0.0% lived in rural areas.

There were 6,605 households in Lyndhurst, of which 20.0% had children under the age of 18 living in them. Of all households, 43.6% were married-couple households, 17.0% were households with a male householder and no spouse or partner present, and 34.2% were households with a female householder and no spouse or partner present. About 36.7% of all households were made up of individuals and 17.9% had someone living alone who was 65 years of age or older.

There were 6,923 housing units, of which 4.6% were vacant. The homeowner vacancy rate was 1.1% and the rental vacancy rate was 7.0%.

Racial composition as of the 2020 census
Race	Number	Percent
White	10,757	76.6%
Black or African American	2,088	14.9%
American Indian and Alaska Native	15	0.1%
Asian	437	3.1%
Native Hawaiian and Other Pacific Islander	1	0.0%
Some other race	139	1.0%
Two or more races	613	4.4%
Hispanic or Latino (of any race)	348	2.5%

=== 2010 census ===
As of the census of 2010, there were 14,001 people, 6,447 households, and 3,826 families residing in the city. The population density was 3,160.5 inhabitants per square mile (1,220.3/km^{2}). There were 6,890 housing units at an average density of 1,555.3 per square mile (600.5/km^{2}). The racial makeup of the city was 90.3% White, 6.4% African American, 1.6% Asian, 0.4% from other races, and 1.2% from two or more races. Hispanic or Latino of any race were 1.3% of the population.

There were 6,447 households, of which 21.4% had children under the age of 18 living with them, 48.2% were married couples living together, 8.4% had a female householder with no husband present, 2.8% had a male householder with no wife present, and 40.7% were non-families. 35.5% of all households were made up of individuals, and 17.3% had someone living alone who was 65 years of age or older. The average household size was 2.15 and the average family size was 2.80.

The median age in the city was 47 years. 17.4% of residents were under the age of 18; 5.2% were between the ages of 18 and 24; 25% were from 25 to 44; 28.1% were from 45 to 64; and 24.3% were 65 years of age or older. The gender makeup of the city was 46.0% male and 54.0% female.

== Education ==
Schools of the South Euclid-Lyndhurst City School District in Lyndhurst are Sunview Elementary School and Charles F. Brush High School.

== Notable people ==
- Eric Carmen, musician and lead singer of the Raspberries
- Nick Caserio, NFL executive and general manager of the Houston Texans
- Steven Hirsch, founder of Vivid Entertainment
- Josh Mandel, former Ohio State Treasurer
- The Poni-Tails, 1950s girl group
- Rick Smith Jr, professional illusionist and card thrower.
- Mike Trivisonno, radio broadcaster for WTAM
