= Walk a Mile in My Shoes: The Essential '70s Masters =

Walk A Mile In My Shoes: The Essential 70s Masters

Box set by Elvis Presley
- Released: October 10, 1995
- Recorded: February 1970 – June 1977
- Genres: Rock, pop, country, R&B
- Length: 6:12:11
- Label: RCA Records
- Producers: Ernst Mikael Jorgensen; Roger Semon

Elvis Presley chronology
Command Performances: The Essential 60s Masters II (1995)	Walk A Mile In My Shoes: The Essential 70s Masters (1995)	Elvis 56 (1996)

Professional ratings
Review scores
Source	Rating
AllMusic	5/5 stars
MusicHound	4.5/5 stars
The Rolling Stone Album Guide	5/5 stars
Rough Guides	5/5 stars

Walk a Mile in My Shoes: The Essential '70s Masters is a five-disc box set compilation of the recorded work of Elvis Presley during the decade of the 1970s. It was released in 1995 by RCA Records, catalog number 66670-2, following similar box sets that covered his musical output in the 1950s and both his non-soundtrack and soundtrack work of the 1960s. This set's initial long-box release included a set of collectable stamps duplicating the record jackets of the LP albums on which the tracks in the box set were originally released by RCA. It also includes a booklet with an extensive session list and discography, as well as a lengthy essay by Dave Marsh, some of it excerpted from his 1982 book on Presley. The box set was certified gold by the Recording Industry Association of America on July 15, 1999.

== Contents ==
The first two discs present the A and b sides of every single released in the United States by Presley during the decade, with the following exceptions: "Kentucky Rain" backed with "My Little Friend," and the b-side to "The Wonder of You," "Mama Liked the Roses," recorded in the 1960s; the gospel single "He Touched Me" b/w "Bosom of Abraham," and the gospel b-sides respectively to the singles "Life" and "If You Talk in Your Sleep," "Only Believe" and "Help Me," all four tracks already included on his first gospel compilation; and "Merry Christmas Baby" b/w "O Come All Ye Faithful", although the album version of the single can be found on disc four. His final two singles issued posthumously, the #22 "My Way" b/w "America the Beautiful" from November 1977, and "Unchained Melody" b/w "Softly As I Leave You" from February 1978, are also not included, although "Unchained Melody" is on the fifth disc, and versions of "My Way" and "Softly As I Leave You" are also on other discs in the set. Of the 23 American singles on these discs, 19 made the Top 40, with "The Wonder of You" and "Burning Love" also making the top ten. Included as well are four tracks issued at 45 rpm in Great Britain only: the top ten single "I Just Can't Help Believin'" b/w "How the Web Was Woven", the A-side "Green Green Grass of Home", and "Loving Arms", the British flip side to "My Boy." In the U.S., both sides of the British "I Just Can't Help Believin'" single had appeared as two LP tracks on That's the Way It Is, "Loving Arms" on Good Times, and "Green Grass" on Today.

Discs three and four compile studio tracks from various albums, with ten previously unreleased recordings or alternate takes. All but five of the 23 tracks on disc three originate from a single series of sessions, held over four days during June 1970, at RCA Studio B in Nashville, Tennessee. Facsimiles of the albums That's the Way It Is and "Elvis Country" can be assembled from tracks on this box, with the bulk of the two albums on this disc. Disc four continues highlights from 1971 through Presley's final studio session, at home in Graceland on October 30, 1976. It includes two songs by Bob Dylan, "I Shall Be Released" and "Don't Think Twice, It's All Right", and a master studio take of the Sinatra signature song, "My Way."

The fifth disc approximates a Presley stage show typical to the era, taken mostly from shows in 1970 and 1972, with 21 songs running to about an hour. Eleven of the concert tracks are previously unreleased, "Reconsider Baby" and "I'll Remember You" originating from the matinee show at Madison Square Garden issued later in 1997 on An Afternoon in the Garden. The disc does not open, as Presley shows often did, with the introduction to Strauss' tone poem Also sprach Zarathustra, played by the backing orchestra to announce the entrance of Elvis. The rock and roll instrumental support consists of the TCB Band, in addition to Presley's usual coterie of back-up vocalists, and the orchestra led by Joe Guercio. The final five songs present a "rehearsal" for the show, deriving from informal recordings made at actual rehearsals at RCA Studios in Hollywood in preparation for Elvis: That's the Way It Is and for a summer 1974 engagement in Las Vegas.

RCA Records issued two similarly configured box set companions, one for the 1950s, and another for the 1960s, the former his complete known masters from that decade, and the latter set chronicling his non-soundtrack/non-gospel recordings from the second decade of his career. Additional two-disc sets featuring his complete gospel recordings and selections from his soundtracks were also issued under this series. Unlike the first two decades collections, however, the compilers of Walk a Mile in My Shoes chose not to collect every studio recording Presley made during his final decade, choosing to focus on the singles, a sampling of "studio highlights" and an example of his live work.

Professional studio recordings made at RCA Studio B in Nashville, RCA Studio C in Hollywood, Stax Studio in Memphis, and in the Jungle Room at Graceland. Live recordings from The International Hotel in Las Vegas, Madison Square Garden in New York City, the H.I.C. Arena in Honolulu, and the Crisler Arena in Ann Arbor, Michigan. Original recordings produced by Felton Jarvis. "Are You Sincere" recorded at Elvis' home in Palm Springs, California, and produced by Presley.

== Purpose ==
After the success of his television special in 1968, the album From Elvis in Memphis and the chart-topping single "Suspicious Minds" in 1969, Presley stopped making motion pictures, which had become central to his public identity in the 1960s, and concentrated on making music. During the course of the 1970s, in addition to the aforementioned singles, 41 Presley albums appeared in the U.S. prior to his death: seven new compilations from RCA, including The Sun Sessions; nine compilations on the budget RCA Camden label, including an altered reissue of the 1957 Christmas album; two additional compilations on the bargain-bin Pickwick label; four more reissues; six concert documents, including Having Fun with Elvis on Stage and the posthumous Elvis in Concert; and thirteen original albums of new material, with one Christmas LP and one gospel LP among them.

As seen from the chart positions in the discography, public reaction to Presley's output during this period was mixed, in part owing to the sheer volume of released items. Unlike the fifties box, Walk a Mile in My Shoes cherry-picks the material in three sections – commercial singles, choice album cuts, and live performance. Winnowing down the selections argues for the continued vitality of Presley's work in this period. As stated by Marsh in the liner notes:

Elvis' Seventies music has been picked at and picked over, issued and reissued, discussed, dissected, distorted, displayed, and dismissed. But it's only now, gathered into one place, that it kind of makes you gulp a bit to realize how productive he was in the last six years of his life...Certainly, Elvis' albums lack the structural integrity of some other artists recording in this period – which is one reason a box set such as this can in fact present a clearer picture of his music than weeding through all his discs one by one.

== Track listing ==
Chart positions for albums from the Billboard 200; positions for singles from the Billboard Hot 100, except where noted. Certain tracks listed as unreleased on the insert card of the jewel cases are unedited masters of issued tracks, or without later overdubs; those are indicated with an asterisk and listed with the original issue information for the released master.

=== Disc one: The Singles ===
Track	Song title	Writer(s)	Time	Recorded	Release date	Catalogue	Chart peak
1.	The Wonder of You	Baker Knight	2:34	1970-02-18	1970-04-20	47-9835	#9
2.	I've Lost You	Alan Blaikley and Ken Howard	3:30	1970-06-04	1970-07-14	47–9873	#32
3.	The Next Step Is Love	Paul Evans and Paul Parnes	3:31	1970-06-07	1970-07-14	47-9873b	
4.	You Don't Have to Say You Love Me	Vicki Wickham, Simon Napier-Bell, Pino Donaggio, Vito Pallavicini	2:30	1970-06-06	1970-10-06	47–9916	#11
5.	Patch It Up	Eddie Rabbitt and Rory Bourke	3:08	1970-06-08	1970-10-06	47-9916b	
6.	I Really Don't Want to Know	Howard Barnes and Don Robertson	2:54	1970-06-07	1970-12-08	47–9960	#21
7.	There Goes My Everything	Dallas Frazier	2:58	1970-06-08	1970-12-08	47-9960b	
8.	Rags to Riches	Richard Adler and Jerry Ross	1:54	1970-09-22	1971-02-03	47–9980	#33
9.	Where Did They Go, Lord	Dallas Frazier and A.L. "Doodle" Owens	2:27	1970-09-22	1971-02-03	47-9980b	
10.	Life	Shirl Milete	3:10	1970-06-06	1971-05-25	47–9985	#53
11.	I'm Leavin'	Michael Jarrett and Sonny Charles	3:51	1971-05-20	1971-06-22	47–9998	#36
12.	Heart of Rome	Alan Blaikley, Ken Howard, Geoff Stephens	2:53	1970-06-06	1971-06-22	47-9998b	
13.	It's Only Love	Mark James and Steve Tyrell	2:41	1971-05-20	1971-09-21	48–1017	#51
14.	The Sound of Your Cry	Bernie Baum, Bill Giant, Florence Kaye	3:17	1970-06-04	1971-09-21	48-1017b	
15.	I Just Can't Help Believin'	Cynthia Weil and Barry Mann	4:34	1970-08-11	1971-11	2158	UK #6
16.	How the Web Was Woven	David Most and Clive Westlake	3:25	1970-06-05	1971-11	2158b	
17.	Until It's Time for You to Go	Buffy Sainte-Marie	2:17	1971-05-17	1972-01-04	74–0619	#40
18.	We Can Make the Morning	Jay Ramsey	3:54	1971-05-20	1972-01-04	74-0619b	
19.	An American Trilogy	Mickey Newbury	4:30	1972-02-16	1972-04-04	74–0672	#66
20.	The First Time Ever I Saw Your Face	Ewan MacColl	3:42	1971-03-15	1972-04-04	74-0672b	
21.	Burning Love	Dennis Linde	2:50	1972-03-28	1972-08-01	74–0769	#2
22.	It's a Matter of Time	Clive Westlake	3:02	1972-03-29	1972-08-01	74-0769b	
23.	Separate Ways	Red West and Richard Mainegra	2:36	1972-03-27	1972-10-31	74–0815	#20

=== Disc two: The Singles ===
Track	Song title	Writer(s)	Time	Recorded	Release date	Catalogue	Chart peak
1.	Always on My Mind	Johnny Christopher, Mark James, Wayne Carson	3:37	1972-03-29	1972-10-31	74-0815b	
2.	Fool	Carl Sigman and James Last	3:30	1972-03-28	1973-03-04	74-0910b	
3.	Steamroller Blues	James Taylor	3:04	1973-01-14	1973-03-04	74–0910	#17
4.	Raised on Rock	Mark James	2:38	1973-07-23	1973-09-22	APBO 0088	#41
5.	For Ol' Times Sake	Tony Joe White	3:36	1973-07-23	1973-09-22	APBO 0088b	
6.	I've Got a Thing About You Baby	Tony Joe White	2:20	1973-07-22	1974-01-11	APBO 0196	#39
7.	Take Good Care of Her	Arthur Kent and Edward C. Warren	2:51	1973-07-21	1974-01-11	APBO 0196b	
8.	If You Talk in Your Sleep	Red West and Johnny Christopher	2:34	1973-12-11	1974-05-10	APBO 0280	#17
9.	Promised Land	Chuck Berry	2:55	1973-12-15	1974-09-27	PB 10074	#14
10.	It's Midnight	Billy Edd Wheeler and Jerry Chesnut	3:21	1973-12-10	1974-09-27	PB 10074b	
11.	My Boy	Bill Martin, Jean-Pierre Bourtrayre, Phil Coulter, Claude Francois	3:19	1973-12-13	1975-01-04	PB 10191	#20
12.	Loving Arms	Tom Jans	2:50	1973-12-13	1974-10	2548b	
13.	T-R-O-U-B-L-E	Jerry Chesnut and Steve Tyrell	3:02	1975-03-11	1975-04-22	PB 10278	#35
14.	Mr. Songman	Donnie Sumner	2:07	1973-12-12	1975-04-23	PB 10278b	
15.	Bringing It Back	Gregg Gordon	3:00	1975-03-12	1975-09-30	PB 10401	#65
16.	Pieces of My Life	Troy Seals	4:03	1975-03-12	1975-09-30	PB 10401b	
17.	Green Green Grass of Home	Curly Putman	3:35	1975-03-10	1975-11	2635	UK #29
18.	Thinking About You	Tim Baty	3:00	1973-12-12	1975-01-04	PB 10191b	
19.	Hurt	Jimmie Crane and Al Jacobs	2:06	1976-02-05	1976-03-12	PB 10601	#28
20.	For the Heart	Dennis Linde	3:22	1976-02-05	1976-03-12	PB 10601b	
21.	Moody Blue	Mark James	3:22	1976-02-04	1976-11-29	PB 10857	#31
22.	She Thinks I Still Care	Dickey Lee	3:51	1976-02-02	1976-11-29	PB 10857b	
23.	Way Down	Layng Martine Jr.	2:38	1976-10-29	1977-06-06	PB 10998	#18
24.	Pledging My Love	Don Robey and Ferdinand Washington	2:50	1976-10-29	1977-06-06	PB 10998b	

=== Disc three: Studio Highlights 1970–1971 ===
Track	Song title	Writer(s)	Time	Recorded	Release date	Catalogue	Original issue	Chart peak
1.	Twenty Days and Twenty Nights	Scott Weisman and Clive Westlake	3:15	1970-06-04	1970-11-11	LSP 4445	That's the Way It Is	#21
2.	I Was Born About Ten Thousand Years Ago	Traditional	3:28	1970-06-04	1972-02-20	LSP 4460	Elvis Now	#43
3.	The Fool	Naomi Ford and Lee Hazlewood	2:24	1970-06-04	1971-01-02	LSP 4671	Elvis Country	#12
4.	A Hundred Years from Now	Lester Flatt and Earl Scruggs	1:40	1970-06-04			previously unreleased	
5.	Little Cabin on the Hill	Bill Monroe and Lester Flatt	1:47	1970-06-04	1971-01-02	LSP 4460	Elvis Country	#12
6.	Cindy, Cindy	Dolores Fuller, Buddy Kaye, Fred Wise, Ben Weisman	2:31	1970-06-04	1971-06-16	LSP 4530	Love Letters from Elvis	#33
7.	Bridge over Troubled Water	Paul Simon	4:29	1970-06-05	1970-11-11	LSP 4445	That's the Way It Is	#21
8.	Got My Mojo Working / Keep Your Hands Off of It	Preston Foster, Elvis Presley	4:34	1970-06-05	1971-06-16	LSP 4530	Love Letters from Elvis	#33
9.	It's Your Baby, You Rock It	Shirl Milete and Nora Fowler	2:59	1970-06-05	1971-01-02	LSP 4460	Elvis Country	#12
10.	Stranger in the Crowd	Winfield Scott	3:47	1970-06-05	1970-11-11	LSP 4445	That's the Way It Is	#21
11.	Mary in the Morning	Johnny Cymbal and Michael Rashkow	4:11	1970-06-05	1970-11-11	LSP 4445	That's the Way It Is	#21
12.	It Ain't No Big Thing (But It's Growing)	Shorty Hall, Alice Joy Merritt, Neal Merritt	2:46	1970-06-06	1971-06-16	LSP 4530	Love Letters from Elvis	#33
13.	Just Pretend	Guy Fletcher and Doug Flett	4:02	1970-06-06	1970-11-11	LSP 4445	That's the Way It Is	#21
14.	Faded Love*	Bob Wills and Johnnie Lee Wills	4:06	1970-06-07	1971-01-02	LSP 4460	Elvis Country	#12
15.	Tomorrow Never Comes*	Johnny Bond and Ernest Tubb	4:04	1970-06-07	1971-01-02	LSP 4460	Elvis Country	#12
16.	Make the World Go Away	Hank Cochran	3:35	1970-06-07	1971-01-02	LSP 4460	Elvis Country	#12
17.	Funny How Time Slips Away	Willie Nelson	4:19	1970-06-07	1971-01-02	LSP 4460	Elvis Country	#12
18.	I Washed My Hands in Muddy Water*	Joe Babcock	4:57	1970-06-07	1971-01-02	LSP 4460	Elvis Country	#12
19.	Snowbird	Gene MacLellan	2:04	1970-09-22	1971-01-02	LSP 4460	Elvis Country	#12
20.	Whole Lotta Shakin' Goin' On	Dave "Curly" Williams and Sunny David	3:02	1970-09-22	1971-01-02	LSP 4460	Elvis Country	#12
21.	Amazing Grace*	Traditional	3:26	1971-03-15	1972-04-03	LSP 4690	He Touched Me	#79
22.	(That's What You Get) For Lovin' Me	Gordon Lightfoot	2:08	1971-03-15	1973-07-16	APL1 0283	Elvis	#52
23.	Lady Madonna	John Lennon and Paul McCartney	1:20	1971-05-17			previously unreleased	

=== Disc four: Studio Highlights 1971–1976 ===
Track	Song title	Writer(s)	Time	Recorded	Release date	Catalogue	Original issue	Chart peak
1.	Merry Christmas, Baby	Lou Baxter and Johnny Moore	5:43	1971-05-15	1971-10-20	LSP 4579	Wonderful World of Christmas	
2.	I Shall Be Released	Bob Dylan	0:48	1971-05-20			previously unreleased	
3.	Don't Think Twice, It's All Right*	Bob Dylan	4:00	1971-05-16	1973-07-16	APL1 0283	Elvis	#52
4.	It's Still Here*	Ivory Joe Hunter	3:29	1971-05-19	1973-07-16	APL1 0283	Elvis	#52
5.	I'll Take You Home Again, Kathleen*	Thomas P. Westendorf	2:28	1971-05-19	1973-07-16	APL1 0283	Elvis	#52
6.	I Will Be True	Ivory Joe Hunter	2:34	1971-05-19	1973-07-16	APL1 0283	Elvis	#52
7.	My Way	Paul Anka, Claude Francois, Jacques Revaux	4:32	1971-06-10			previously unreleased	
8.	For the Good Times	Kris Kristofferson	3:11	1972-03-27			previously unreleased	
9.	Just a Little Bit	Ralph Bass, Buster Brown, John Thornton, Fats Washington	2:31	1973-07-22	1973-10-01	APL1 0388	Raised on Rock	#50
10.	It's Diff'rent Now	Clive Westlake	2:31	1973-07-21			previously unreleased	
11.	Are You Sincere	Wayne Walker	1:59	1973-09-23	1973-10-01	APL1 0388	Raised on Rock	#50
12.	I Got a Feelin' in My Body	Dennis Linde	3:33	1973-12-10	1974-03-20	CPL1 0475	Good Times	#90
13.	You Asked Me To	Waylon Jennings and Billy Joe Shaver	2:52	1973-12-11	1975-01-08	APL1 0873	Promised Land	#47
14.	Good Time Charlie's Got the Blues	Danny O'Keefe	3:12	1973-12-13	1974-03-20	CPL1 0475	Good Times	#90
15.	Talk About the Good Times	Jerry Reed Hubbard	2:36	1973-12-14	1974-03-20	CPL1 0475	Good Times	#90
16.	Tiger Man	Joe Hill Louis and Sam Phillips (under the pseudonym Sam Burns)	3:05	1975-03-11			previously unreleased	
17.	I Can Help	Billy Swan	4:02	1975-03-10	1975-05-07	APL1 1039	Today	#57
18.	Susan When She Tried	Don Reid	2:16	1975-03-11	1975-05-07	APL1 1039	Today	#57
19.	Shake a Hand	Joe Morris	3:48	1975-03-11	1975-05-07	APL1 1039	Today	#57
20.	She Thinks I Still Care	Dickey Lee	3:26	1976-02-02			unreleased alternate take	
21.	Danny Boy	Frederic Weatherly	3:56	1976-02-05	1976-04-20	APL1 1506	From Elvis Presley Boulevard	#41
22.	Love Coming Down	Jerry Chesnut	3:06	1976-02-06	1976-04-20	APL1 1506	From Elvis Presley Boulevard	#41
23.	He'll Have to Go	Joe Allison and Audrey Allison	4:30	1976-10-30	1977-07-19	AFL1 2428	Moody Blue	#3

=== Disc five: The Elvis Presley Show ===
Track	Song title	Writer(s)	Time	Recorded	Release date	Catalogue	Original issue	Chart peak
1.	See See Rider	Traditional	2:23	1970-02-18	1970-06-23	LSP 4362	On Stage: February 1970	#13
2.	Men with Broken Hearts	Hank Williams	0:31	1970-08-11			previously unreleased	
3.	Walk A Mile In My Shoes	Joe South	2:57	1970-02-19	1970-06-23	LSP 4362	On Stage: February 1970	#13
4.	Polk Salad Annie	Tony Joe White	4:46	1970-02-18	1970-06-23	LSP 4362	On Stage: February 1970	#13
5.	Let It Be Me	Gilbert Bécaud, Mann Curtis, Pierre Delanoë	3:28	1970-02-17	1970-06-23	LSP 4362	On Stage: February 1970	#13
6.	Proud Mary	John Fogerty	2:30	1970-02-16	1970-06-23	LSP 4362	On Stage: February 1970	#13
7.	Something	George Harrison	3:40	1970-08-11			previously unreleased	
8.	You've Lost That Lovin' Feelin'	Barry Mann, Cynthia Weil, Phil Spector	4:23	1970-08-12	1970-11-11	LSP 4445	That's the Way It Is	#21
9.	Heartbreak Hotel	Mae Axton, Tommy Durden, Elvis Presley	1:41	1970-08-11			previously unreleased	
10.	I Was the One	Aaron Schroeder, Claude DeMetrius, Hal Blair, Bill Peppers	1:19	1970-08-12			previously unreleased	
11.	One Night	Dave Bartholomew, Pearl King, Anita Steiman	1:47	1970-08-11			previously unreleased	
12.	Never Been to Spain	Hoyt Axton	3:28	1972-02-16			previously unreleased	
13.	You Gave Me a Mountain	Marty Robbins	3:15	1972-02-16			previously unreleased	
14.	It's Impossible	Armando Manzanero and Sid Wayne	2:52	1972-02-16	1973-07-16	APL1 0283	Elvis	#52
15.	A Big Hunk o' Love	Aaron Schroeder and Sidney Wyche	2:02	1972-02-16			previously unreleased	
16.	It's Over	Jimmie F. Rodgers	2:20	1972-02-17			previously unreleased	
17.	The Impossible Dream	Joe Darion and Mitch Leigh	2:29	1972-02-17	1978-02	AFL1 2772	He Walks Beside Me	#113
18.	Reconsider Baby	Lowell Fulson	2:41	1972-06-10			previously unreleased	
19.	I'll Remember You	Kui Lee	2:35	1972-06-10			previously unreleased	
20.	I'm So Lonesome I Could Cry	Hank Williams	2:15	1973-01-14	1973-02-04	VPSX 6089	Aloha From Hawaii: Via Satellite	#1
21.	Suspicious Minds	Mark James	4:29	1973-01-14	1973-02-04	VPSX 6089	Aloha From Hawaii: Via Satellite	#1
22.	Unchained Melody	Alex North and Hy Zaret	2:27	1977-04-24	1977-07-19	AFL1 2428	Moody Blue	#3
23.	The Twelfth of Never	Jay Livingston and Paul Francis Webster	2:39	1974-08-16			unreleased rehearsal	
24.	Softly As I Leave You	Giorgio Calabrese, Antonio deVita and Hal Shaper	2:14	1974-08-16			unreleased rehearsal	
25.	Allá en el Rancho Grande	Silvano Ramos, Del Moral, Urange	2:04	1970-07-15			unreleased rehearsal	
26.	Froggy Went A-Courting	Traditional	2:15	1970-07-29			unreleased rehearsal	
27.	Stranger in My Own Home Town	Percy Mayfield	4:37	1970-07-24			unreleased rehearsal	

== Personnel ==
- Elvis Presley – vocals, guitar, piano
- James Burton – guitar
- John Wilkinson – guitar
- Charlie Hodge – guitar, backing vocals
- Chip Young – guitar
- Reggie Young – guitar
- Eddie Hinton – guitar
- Dennis Linde – guitar
- Glen Hardin – piano
- David Briggs – keyboards
- Charlie McCoy – organ, harmonica, vibraphone, marimba
- Bobby Wood – piano
- Bobby Emmons – organ
- Tony Brown – keyboards
- Pete Hallin – keyboards
- Greg Gordon – clavinet
- Don Sumner – piano
- Norbert Putnam – bass
- Jerry Scheff – bass
- Emory Gordy – bass
- Tommy Cogbill – bass
- Duke Bardwell – bass
- Thomas Hensley – bass
- Ronnie Tutt – drums
- Jerry Carrigan – drums
- Bob Lanning – drums
- Kenny Buttrey – drums
- Farrell Morris – percussion
- Weldon Myrick – pedal steel guitar
- Bobby Thompson – banjo
- Buddy Spicher – fiddle
- J.D. Sumner & The Stamps – backing vocals
- Kathy Westmoreland – backing vocals
- The Imperials – backing vocals
- The Sweet Inspirations – backing vocals
- The Jordanaires – backing vocals
- The Nashville Edition – backing vocals
- Millie Kirkham – backing vocals
- Mary Holladay – backing vocals
- Ginger Holladay – backing vocals
- June Page – backing vocals
- Sonja Montgomery – backing vocals
- Dolores Edgin – backing vocals
- Mary Greene – backing vocals
- Susan Pilkinton – backing vocals
- Myrna Smith – backing vocals
- Sherrill Nielsen – backing vocals
- Temple Riser - backing vocals
