= Elvis Presley singles discography =

Singles recorded by American singer

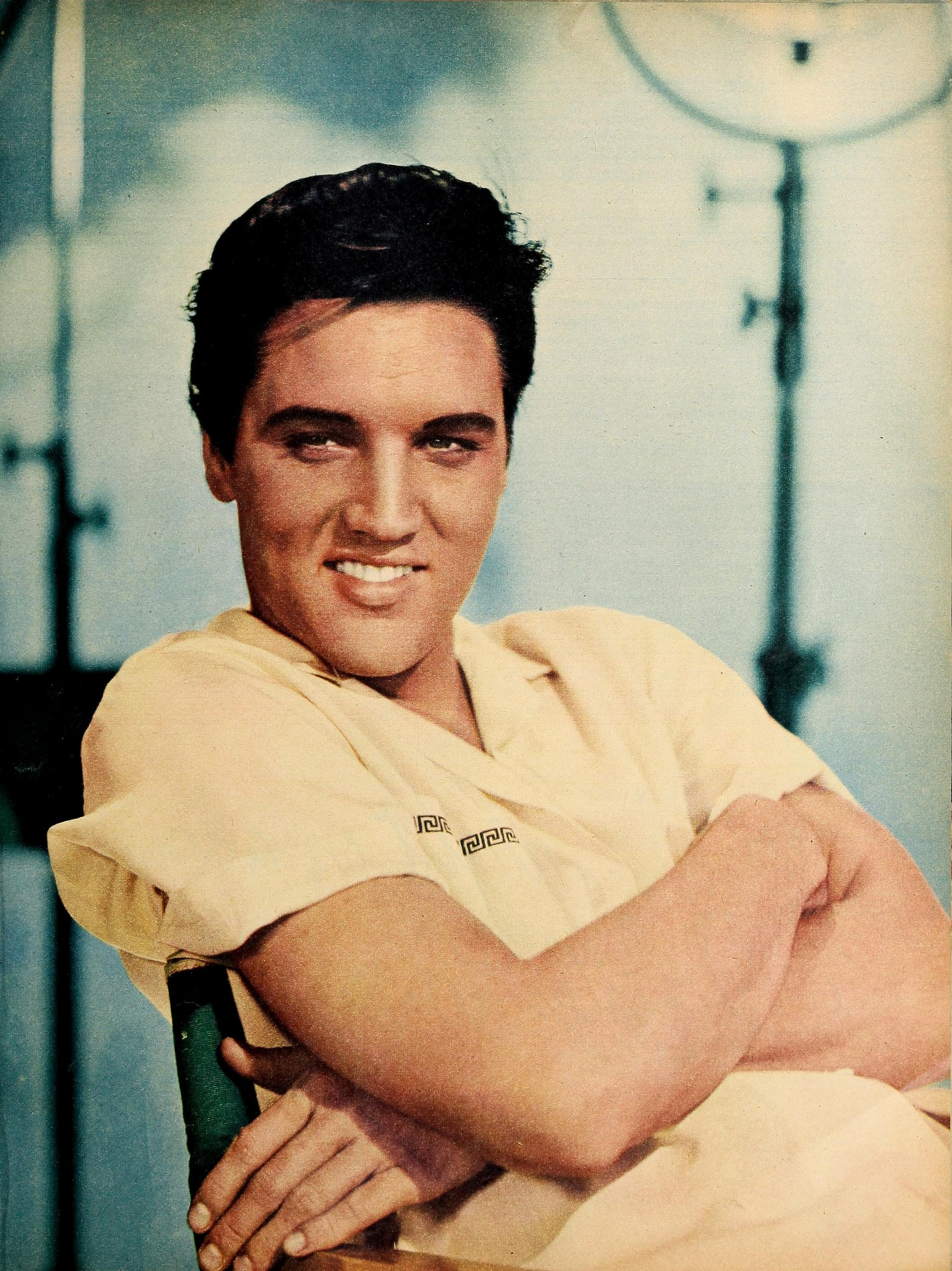
- Presley in June 1958
- Singles: 113
- Posthumous singles: 34
- Charted reissued singles: 61
- Other charted singles: 17

The singles discography of Elvis Presley began in 1954 with the release of his first commercial single, "That's All Right". Following his regional success with Sun Records, Presley was signed to RCA Victor on November 20, 1955. Presley's first single with RCA, "Heartbreak Hotel", was a worldwide hit, reaching the No. 1 position in four countries and the top 10 in many other countries. Other hit singles from the 1950s include "I Want You, I Need You, I Love You", "Don't Be Cruel", "Hound Dog", "Love Me Tender", "Too Much", "All Shook Up", "(Let Me Be Your) Teddy Bear", "Jailhouse Rock", "Don't", "Wear My Ring Around Your Neck", "Hard Headed Woman", "I Got Stung", "One Night", "I Need Your Love Tonight", "(Now & Then There's) A Fool Such as I", and "A Big Hunk o' Love". On March 24, 1958, Presley entered the United States Army at Memphis, Tennessee, and was stationed in Germany. He left active duty on March 5, 1960.

Following his return to civilian life, Presley released his first new single, "Stuck on You", which was a No. 1 hit in the United States and reached the top 10 in ten other countries around the world. The follow-up single, "It's Now or Never", was another worldwide hit, peaking no lower than No. 2 in 13 countries. 1960 and 1961 saw the release of two more U.S. No. 1 hits, "Are You Lonesome Tonight?" and "Surrender". Beginning in late 1961 the majority of Presley's singles were released to promote his films and their associated soundtrack albums. Non-movie songs were regularly coupled with movie songs during this period. In one instance, the movie Tickle Me, all songs were actually from older non movie albums. Hit singles from this period include "Wooden Heart", "(Marie's the Name) His Latest Flame", "Little Sister", "Can't Help Falling in Love", "Good Luck Charm", "She's Not You", "Return to Sender", "(You're the) Devil in Disguise", and "Crying in the Chapel". As Presley's success with singles from his movie soundtracks began to diminish in the late 1960s, he released "If I Can Dream", from his 1968 NBC-TV special, Elvis. The success of the song and television special brought about a resurgence of interest in Presley and his recordings, bringing him two top 10 hits in 1969, "In the Ghetto" and "Suspicious Minds".

In the 1970s, Presley's chart success began to diminish. He had only three U.S. Billboard top 10 singles during the decade, "Don't Cry Daddy", a live recording of "The Wonder of You" and "Burning Love". He did place multiple songs in the top 10 of the Easy Listening and Country Music charts, including several reaching number 1. Other top 40 hits from the 1970s include "Kentucky Rain", "You Don't Have to Say You Love Me", "Separate Ways", "Steamroller Blues", "My Boy", "Hurt", "Moody Blue" and "Way Down".

Following Presley's death on August 16, 1977, new posthumous singles have been released in addition to many of his original singles being reissued around the world. The first single to be issued following Presley's death was a live recording of "My Way", taken from the soundtrack of his final television special, Elvis in Concert. In 1978 another live recording was issued as a single, "Unchained Melody". In 2002, a remix of "A Little Less Conversation" by DJ Junkie XL was released to promote the compilation album ELV1S: 30 #1 Hits. It was a worldwide hit and returned Presley to the top 10 in many countries around the world. In 2003, a remix of "Rubberneckin' by DJ Paul Oakenfold was released to promote the compilation album ELVIS: 2nd to None. It reached the top 10 in a few countries but overall was not as successful as its predecessor.

Presley has 55 singles certified by the Recording Industry Association of America (28 Gold and 27 Platinum - 89 certifications in all) totaling 52 million in sales. In 2012, Presley was ranked second best selling singles artist in the United Kingdom with 21.6 million singles sold. Music historian Joel Whitburn ranked Presley as the #1 charting singles artist of all time in the US. He can also claim the most Top 100 (39), Top 40 (25), and Top 10 (5) double-sided hits of anybody.

== Singles ==
=== 1950s ===
The US chart positions prior to "One Night"/"I Got Stung" are pre-Billboard Hot 100, although they used the previous existing Billboard singles chart that got discontinued for the Billboard Hot 100 in 1958.

Title (A-side/B-side) (Note: The B-sides listed are for the US releases of the singles except where not applicable. Various other songs were released as B-sides to the main A-sides in other countries.)	Year	Peak chart positions											Certifications	A-side first album release
Title (A-side/B-side)	Year	US	US Ctry.	US R&B	AUS	BEL (FLA)	CAN	GER	IRE	NL	NOR	UK	Certifications	A-side first album release
"That's All Right" "Blue Moon of Kentucky"	1954	— (Note: "That's All Right" / "Blue Moon of Kentucky" single was re-released in 2004 and reached number 1 on the Billboard Singles Sales chart.) —	— (Note: "That's All Right" reached 28 on the Music Vendor Country Singles chart; at this time, Billboard published a Top 15 Country Singles chart while Music Vendor published a top 50 chart.) — (Note: "Blue Moon of Kentucky" reached 34 on the Music Vendor Country Singles chart.)	— —	31 (Note: 2004) —	— —	— —	— —	— (Note: 1. 33 in 2005) —	— —	— —	— —	RIAA: Gold ("That's All Right")	For LP Fans Only
"Good Rockin' Tonight" "I Don't Care If the Sun Don't Shine"	1954	— 74 (Note: "I Don't Care If the Sun Don't Shine" was released in the US in 1954 but did not chart until 1956. It was also not released in the UK until 1956.)	— —	— —	— —	— —	— —	— —	— —	— —	— —	— 23	RIAA: Gold ("Good Rockin' Tonight")	A Date with Elvis
"Milkcow Blues Boogie" "You're a Heartbreaker"	1955	— —	— —	— —	— —	— —	— —	— —	— —	— —	— —	— —		A Date with Elvis
"Baby, Let's Play House" "I'm Left, You're Right, She's Gone"	1955	— —	5 — (Note: "I'm Left, You're Right, She's Gone" reached 33 on the Music Vendor Country Singles chart.)	— —	— —	— —	— —	— —	— —	— —	— —	— 21 (Note: "I'm Left, You're Right, She's Gone" did not chart in the UK until 1958.)		A Date with Elvis; For LP Fans Only
"I Forgot to Remember to Forget" "Mystery Train"	1955	— —	1; 11	— —	— —	— —	— —	— —	— —	— —	— —	— 25 (Note: "Mystery Train" did not chart in the UK until 1957.)		A Date with Elvis
"Heartbreak Hotel" "I Was the One"	1956	1; 19	1; 8	3 —	3 (Note: 1. 37 in 2006); 40	— —	— —	12 —	— (Note: 1. 19 in 2007) —	51 (Note: 2007) —	— —	2 —	RIAA: 2× Platinum; BPI: Silver	Elvis' Golden Records
"I Want You, I Need You, I Love You" "My Baby Left Me"	1956	1; 31	1; 13	3 —	19 —	— —	— —	— —	— — (Note: 1. 49 in 2007)	— —	— —	14 —	RIAA: Platinum	Elvis' Golden Records
"Don't Be Cruel" "Hound Dog"	1956	1 (Note: The single stayed at number 1 on the Billboard Single Sales and Jukebox charts for a total of 11 weeks; for the first 5 weeks "Hound Dog" was listed as the A-side and the last 6 weeks "Don't Be Cruel" was listed as the A-side.); 1	1; 1	1; 1	12; 17	— 13	— —	12 —	— — (Note: 1. 25 in 2007)	— 21 (Note: 1974)	— —	— 2	RIAA: 4× Platinum; BPI: Platinum/Gold ("Don't Be Cruel/Hound Dog"); RMNZ: Gold	Elvis' Golden Records
"Blue Suede Shoes" "Tutti Frutti"	1956	20 —	— (Note: "Blue Suede Shoes" was listed at number 2 on the Music Vendor Country Singles chart.) —	— —	18	— —	— —	— 9	— (Note: 1. 24 in 2007) —	— —	— —	9 —	RIAA: Gold; BPI: Silver ("Blue Suede Shoes"); RMNZ: Gold ("Blue Suede Shoes")	Elvis Presley
"I Got a Woman" "I'm Counting on You"	1956	— —	— —	— —	— —	— —	— —	— —	— —	— —	— —	— —		Elvis Presley
"I'll Never Let You Go (Little Darlin')" "I'm Gonna Sit Right Down and Cry (over You)"	1956	— —	— —	— —	— —	— —	— —	— —	— —	— —	— —	— —		Elvis Presley
"Tryin' to Get to You" "I Love You Because"	1956	— —	— —	— —	— —	— —	— —	— —	— —	— —	— —	16 —		Elvis Presley
"Just Because" "Blue Moon"	1956	— (Note: "Just Because" reached number 53 on the Music Vendor singles chart.); 55	— (Note: "Just Because" reached number 54 on the Music Vendor Country Singles chart.) —	— —	— —	— —	— —	— —	— —	— —	— —	— 9		Elvis Presley
"Money Honey" "One Sided Love Affair"	1956	76 —	— —	— —	— —	— —	— —	— —	— —	— —	— —	— —		Elvis Presley
"Shake, Rattle and Roll" "Lawdy Miss Clawdy"	1956	— —	— —	— —	— —	— —	— —	— —	— —	— —	— —	— 15		For LP Fans Only
"Love Me Tender" "Any Way You Want Me (That's How I'll Be)"	1956	1; 27	3 — (Note: "Any Way You Want Me" reached 21 on the Music Vendor Country Singles chart.)	3; 12	6 —	— —	— —	16 —	— —	57 (Note: 1991) —	— —	11 —	RIAA: 3× Platinum; BPI: Silver ("Love Me Tender")	Elvis' Golden Records
"Too Much" "Playing for Keeps"	1957	1; 21	3; 8	3 —	14 —	— —	— —	— —	— —	— —	— —	6 —	RIAA: Platinum ("Too Much")	Elvis' Golden Records
"Rip It Up" (Note: "Rip It Up" was not released as a single in the US, but was released in the UK and several other countries.) "Baby, Let's Play House"	1957	— —	— —	— —	— —	— —	— —	— —	— —	— —	— —	27 —		Elvis A Date with Elvis
"All Shook Up" "That's When Your Heartaches Begin"	1957	1; 58	1 — (Note: "That's When Your Heartaches Begin" reached 19 on the Music Vendor Country Singles chart.)	1 —	5 —	12 —	1 —	16 —	— (Note: 1. 24 in 2005) —	8 —	— —	1 —	RIAA: 2× Platinum ("All Shook Up"); BPI: Silver ("All Shook Up"); RMNZ: Gold ("All Shook Up")	Elvis' Golden Records
"(Let Me Be Your) Teddy Bear" "Loving You"	1957	1; 20	1; 15	1 —	8; 22	12 —	1; 15	— —	— (Note: 1. 24 in 2007) —	14 —	— —	3; 24	RIAA: 2× Platinum	Loving You (soundtrack)
"Paralyzed" (Note: "Paralyzed" was released on an EP in the US, and as a single in the UK.) "When My Blue Moon Turns to Gold Again"	1957	59; 19	— — (Note: "When My Blue Moon Turns to Gold Again" reached number 51 on the Music Vendor Country singles chart.)	— —	— —	— —	— —	— —	— —	— —	— —	8 —		Elvis
"Party" (Note: "Party" was not released as a single in the US, but was in the UK and several other European countries.) "Got a Lot o' Livin' to Do"	1957	— —	— —	— —	— —	— —	— —	— —	— (Note: 1. 27 in 2007) —	46 (Note: 2007) —	— —	2; 17		Loving You (soundtrack)
"Jailhouse Rock" "Treat Me Nice"	1957	1; 27	1; 11	1; 7	3; 44	8 —	1 `13	10 —	— (Note: 1. 23 in 2005) —	4 (Note: 1974) —	— —	1 —	RIAA: 2× Platinum ("Jailhouse Rock"); BPI: Platinum ("Jailhouse Rock"); BVMI: Gold ("Jailhouse Rock"); RMNZ: Platinum ("Jailhouse Rock")	Elvis' Golden Records
"Santa Bring My Baby Back (to Me)" (Note: "Santa Bring My Baby Back (to Me)" was not released as a single in the US, but was released in the UK and several other European countries.) "Santa Claus Is Back in Town"	1957	— (Note: Due to airplay of the songs from the album, Music Vendor listed the "Elvis Christmas Album" at number 49 on their Singles Chart in December 1957.) —	— —	— —	— —	— —	— —	— —	— —	— —	— —	7 —	RIAA: Platinum ("Santa Claus Is Back in Town")	Elvis' Christmas Album
"Don't" "I Beg of You"	1958	1; 8	2; 4	4; 5	9; 34	— —	1	17 —	— (Note: 1. 27 in 2007) —	59 (Note: 2007) —	— —	2 —	RIAA: Platinum ("Don't")	50,000,000 Elvis Fans Can't Be Wrong: Elvis' Gold Records, Vol. 2
"Wear My Ring Around Your Neck" "Doncha' Think It's Time"	1958	2; 15	3 (Note: "Wear My Ring Around Your Neck" reached number 1 on the Cashbox Country Singles charts.) — (Note: "Doncha' Think It's Time" reached 25 on the Music Vendor Country Singles chart.)	1; 10	4 —	— —	1; 10	— —	— (Note: 1. 25 in 2007) —	— —	— —	3 —	RIAA: Platinum ("Wear My Ring Around Your Neck")	50,000,000 Elvis Fans Can't Be Wrong: Elvis' Gold Records, Vol. 2
"Hard Headed Woman" "Don't Ask Me Why"	1958	1; 25	2 — (Note: "Don't Ask Me Why" reached 29 on the Cash Box Country and 24 on the Music Vendor Country Singles charts.)	2; 9	2 —	17 —	1; 4	— —	— (Note: 1. 26 in 2007) —	78 (Note: 2007) —	— —	2 —	RIAA: Platinum ("Hard Headed Woman")	King Creole (soundtrack)
"King Creole" (Note: "King Creole" was released as an extended play (EP) in the US, and as a single in the UK and several other European countries.) "Dixieland Rock"	1958	— (Note: "King Creole" reached number 20 on Cash Box and 14 on Music Vendor singles charts, and number 1 on the Gavin airplay chart.) —	— (Note: "King Creole" reached number 12 on the Music Vendor Country Singles charts.) —	— —	— —	7 —	15 —	— —	— (Note: 1. 23 in 2007) —	75 (Note: 2007) —	3 —	2 —		King Creole (soundtrack)
"One Night" "I Got Stung"	1958	4; 8	24 — (Note: "I Got Stung" reached 13 on the Cash Box Country and 12 on the Music Vendor Country Singles charts.)	10 —	33; 10	9 —	1	— —	1 (Note: "One Night" was #15 in 2007)	8	— 2	1	RIAA Platinum ("I Got Stung")	50,000,000 Elvis Fans Can't Be Wrong: Elvis' Gold Records, Vol. 2
"(Now and Then There's) A Fool Such as I" "I Need Your Love Tonight"	1959	2 (Note: "(Now and Then There's) A Fool Such as I" reached number 1 on the Music Vendor Singles chart.); 4	— (Note: "(Now and Then There's) A Fool Such as I" reached number 5 on the Cash Box and number 2 on the Music Vendor Country Singles charts.) — (Note: "I Need Your Love Tonight" reached 23 on the Cash Box Country and 4 on the Music Vendor Country Singles charts.)	16 —	1; 18	13 —	1	— 15	2 (Note: 1. 28 in 2005); 3	5; 5	5; 2	1	RIAA Platinum ("(Now and Then There's) A Fool Such as I")	50,000,000 Elvis Fans Can't Be Wrong: Elvis' Gold Records, Vol. 2
"A Big Hunk o' Love" "My Wish Came True"	1959	1; 12	— (Note: "A Big Hunk o' Love" reached number 36 on the Cash Box and number 6 on the Music Vendor Country Singles charts.) — (Note: "My Wish Came True" reached 43 on the Cash Box Country and 11 on the Music Vendor Country Singles charts.)	10; 15	2; 37	8 —	1	23 —	5 (Note: 1. 23 in 2007) —	19 —	2 —	4 —	RIAA: Gold ("A Big Hunk o' Love")	50,000,000 Elvis Fans Can't Be Wrong: Elvis' Gold Records, Vol. 2
"—" denotes singles which were not released in that country or failed to chart.

=== 1960s ===
Title (A-side/B-side)	Year	Peak chart positions													Certifications	A-side first album release
Title (A-side/B-side)	Year	US	US AC	US Ctry.	US R&B	AUS	AUT	BEL (FLA)	CAN	GER	IRE	NL	NOR	UK	Certifications	A-side first album release
"Stuck on You" "Fame and Fortune"	1960	1; 17	— —	27 —	6 —	1	— —	4 —	1	23 —	3 —	8 —	2 —	3 —	RIAA: Platinum ("Stuck on You")	Elvis' Golden Records, Vol. 3
"It's Now or Never" "A Mess of Blues"	1960	1; 32	— —	— (Note: "It's Now or Never" reached 21 on the Music Vendor Country Singles chart.) —	7 —	1; 11	— —	1 —	1	2 —	1 (Note: 1. 6 in 2005); 1	1 —	1; 4	1; 2	RIAA: Platinum ("It's Now or Never"); BPI: Silver ("It's Now or Never")	Elvis' Golden Records, Vol. 3
"Are You Lonesome Tonight?" "I Gotta Know"	1960	1; 20	— —	22 —	3 —	1	— —	1 —	1	4 —	1 (Note: 1. 24 in 2005) —	5 —	3 —	1 —	RIAA: 2× Platinum ("Are You Lonesome Tonight?"); BPI: Silver ("Are You Lonesome Tonight?")	Elvis' Golden Records, Vol. 3
"Surrender" "Lonely Man"	1961	1; 32	— —	— (Note: "Surrender" reached 23 on the Music Vendor Country Singles chart.) —	— —	1 —	— —	1 —	1	6 —	1 (Note: 1. 25 in 2005) —	3 —	2 —	1 —	RIAA: Platinum ("Surrender")	Elvis' Golden Records, Vol. 3
"Wooden Heart" (Note: "Wooden Heart" was not released as a single in the US and did not chart there until 1964 when it was released as the B-side for "Blue Christmas". However, it was first released as a single in 1961 in numerous other countries.) "Tonight Is So Right for Love"	1961	— —	— —	— —	— —	1 —	— —	1 —	2 —	2 —	1 (Note: 1. 22 in 2005) —	1 —	3 —	1 —		G.I. Blues (soundtrack)
"I Feel So Bad" "Wild in the Country"	1961	5; 26	— —	— —	15 —	27	— —	4 —	6	19; 24	— 1	4 —	— —	4	RIAA: Gold ("I Feel So Bad")	Elvis' Golden Records, Vol. 3
"(Marie's the Name) His Latest Flame" "Little Sister"	1961	4; 5	2 —	— —	— —	2	— —	— 1	1	35; 25	1 (Note: 1. 21 in 2005) —	20 (Note: 2005); 5	4; 6	1	RIAA: Gold ("(Marie's the Name) His Latest Flame"); BPI: Silver ("(Marie's the Name) His Latest Flame")	Elvis' Golden Records, Vol. 3
"Can't Help Falling in Love" "Rock-A-Hula Baby"	1961	2; 23	1 —	— —	— —	1	— —	— 9	4	22; 26	— 1 (Note: 1. 19 in 2005)	— 7	— 6	1	RIAA: Platinum ("Can't Help Falling in Love"); ARIA: 2× Platinum ("Can't Help Falling in Love"); BPI: 3× Platinum ("Can't Help Falling in Love"); BVMI: Gold ("Can't Help Falling in Love"); RMNZ: 3× Platinum ("Can't Help Falling in Love")	Blue Hawaii (soundtrack)
"No More" (Note: "No More" was not released as a single in the US, but was released in various other countries.) "Blue Hawaii"	1962	— —	— —	— —	— —	7 —	— —	— —	12 —	— —	— —	— —	— —			Blue Hawaii (soundtrack)
"Good Luck Charm" "Anything That's Part of You"	1962	1; 31	— 6	— —	— —	1	— —	3 —	1	6 —	1 (Note: 1. 42 in 2005) —	1 —	1 —	1 —	RIAA: Platinum ("Good Luck Charm")	Elvis' Golden Records, Vol. 3
"She's Not You" "Just Tell Her Jim Said Hello"	1962	5; 55	2; 14	— —	13 —	5	— —	3 —	3	15 —	1 (Note: 1. 37 in 2005) —	4 —	1 —	1 —	RIAA: Gold ("She's Not You")	Elvis' Golden Records, Vol. 3
"King of the Whole Wide World" "Home Is Where the Heart Is"	1962	30 —	— —	— —	— —	— —	— —	15 —	5 —	26 —	— —	— —	1 —	— —		C'mon Everybody
"Return to Sender" "Where Do You Come From"	1962	2 (Note: "Return to Sender" reached number 1 on the Cashbox and Music Vendor singles charts.); 99	— —	— —	5 —	1 —	— —	2 —	1 —	15 —	— (Note: 1. 41 in 2005) —	4 —	1 —	1 —	RIAA: Platinum ("Return to Sender"); BPI: Gold ("Return to Sender"); RMNZ: Gold ("Return to Sender")	Girls! Girls! Girls! (soundtrack)
"One Broken Heart for Sale" "They Remind Me Too Much of You"	1963	11; 53	— —	— —	21 —	9 —	— —	9 —	10	23 —	5 —	— —	2 —	12 —	RIAA: Gold ("One Broken Heart for Sale")	It Happened at the World's Fair (soundtrack)
"(You're the) Devil in Disguise" "Please Don't Drag That String Around"	1963	3 —	— —	— —	9 —	2 —	— —	1 —	1 —	2 —	1 (Note: 1. 31 in 2005) —	1 —	1 —	1 —	RIAA: Gold ("(You're the) Devil in Disguise"); BPI: Gold ("(You're the) Devil in Disguise"); RMNZ: Gold ("(You're the) Devil in Disguise")	Elvis' Gold Records, Vol. 4
"Bossa Nova Baby" "Witchcraft"	1963	8; 32	— —	— —	20 —	4	— —	2 —	21	12 —	— —	8 —	2 —	13 —	RIAA: Gold ("Bossa Nova Baby")	Fun in Acapulco (soundtrack)
"Mexico" (Note: "Mexico" was not released as a single in the US, but was released in several European countries and elsewhere.) "You Can't Say No in Acapulco"	1964	— —	— —	— —	— —	— —	— —	7 —	— —	23 —	— —	9 —	7 —	— —		Fun in Acapulco (soundtrack)
"Fun in Acapulco" (Note: "Fun in Alcapulco" was not released as a single in the US, but was released in certain countries including Australia and Japan.) "I Think I Am Gonna Like It Here"	1964	— —	— —	— —	— —	28 —	— —	— —	— —	— —	— —	— —	— —	— —		Fun in Acapulco (soundtrack)
"Kissin' Cousins" "It Hurts Me"	1964	12; 29	— —	— —	— —	7	— —	12 —	15	27 —	6 —	— —	6 —	10 —	RIAA: Gold ("Kissin' Cousins")	Kissin' Cousins (soundtrack)
"Kiss Me Quick" "Suspicion"	1964	34; 103	— —	— —	— —	— —	— —	2; 6	3 —	3 —	— —	9; 9	3; 9	14 —		Pot Luck with Elvis
"Viva Las Vegas" "What'd I Say"	1964	29; 21	— —	— —	— —	4	— —	12 —	29 —	21 —	8 (Note: 1. 31 in 2007) —	56 (Note: 2007) —	6 —	17 —	RIAA: Gold ("Viva Las Vegas"); BPI: Silver ("Viva Las Vegas")	Elvis' Gold Records, Vol. 4
"Such a Night" "Never Ending"	1964	16; 111	— —	— —	— —	3 —	7 —	2 —	14; 21	40 —	9 —	— —	4 —	13 —		Elvis Is Back!
"Ask Me" "Ain't That Loving You Baby"	1964	12; 16	— —	— —	— —	1	— —	— 5	— 1	— —	— 5	— —	— 4	— 15	RIAA: Gold ("Ain't That Loving You, Baby?")	Elvis' Gold Records, Vol. 4
"Blue Christmas" "Wooden Heart"	1964	18 (Note: "Blue Christmas" reached number 18 on the Gavin airplay chart in 1964 and 1 on the Billboard Rock Streaming Songs chart in 2018 and first reached the Billboard top 40 in 2019, peaking in 2024 at number 18.); 107	— (Note: "Blue Christmas" reached number 1 on the Billboard Christmas Singles Chart in 1964 and 1973.) —	55 (Note: "Blue Christmas" reached number 55 on the Billboard Hot Country Singles Chart in 1998.) —	— —	42 (Note: 2024) —	— (Note: 1. 70 in 2023) —	— —	— —	92 —	— (Note: 1. 38 in 2016) —	26 (Note: 2016) —	— —	11 —	RIAA: Platinum ("Blue Christmas"); ARIA: Gold ("Blue Christmas"); BPI: Platinum ("Blue Christmas"); RMNZ: Platinum ("Blue Christmas")	Elvis' Christmas Album
"Do the Clam" "You'll Be Gone"	1965	21; 121	— —	— —	— —	4 —	— —	10 —	10; 35	— —	— —	— —	— —	19 —		Girl Happy (soundtrack)
"Crying in the Chapel" "I Believe in the Man in the Sky"	1965	3 —	1 —	— —	— —	1	— —	4 —	3 —	23 —	1 (Note: 1. 26 in 2005) —	6 —	1 —	1 —	RIAA: Platinum ("Crying in the Chapel")	How Great Thou Art
"(Such an) Easy Question" "It Feels So Right"	1965	11; 55	1 —	— —	— —	6 —	— —	— —	4 —	— —	— —	— —	— —	— —		Pot Luck with Elvis
"I'm Yours" "(It's a) Long Lonely Highway"	1965	11; 112	1 —	— —	— —	9	— —	8 —	2 —	— —	— —	— —	— —	— —	RIAA: Gold ("I'm Yours")	Pot Luck with Elvis
"Puppet on a String" "Wooden Heart"	1965	14; 110	3 —	— —	— —	28 —	— —	— —	3 —	— —	— —	— —	— —	— —	RIAA: Gold ("Puppet on a String")	Girl Happy (soundtrack)
"Tell Me Why" "Blue River"	1966	33; 95	— —	— —	— —	28; 37	— —	16; 15	6 —	— —	— —	— —	— —	15; 22	RIAA: Gold ("Tell Me Why")	The Other Sides: Worldwide Gold Award Hits, Vol. 2
"Joshua Fit the Battle" "Known Only to Him"	1966	— —	— —	— —	— —	91 —	— —	— —	— —	— —	— —	— —	— —	— —		His Hand in Mine
"Milky White Way" "Swing Down Sweet Chariot"	1966	— —	— —	— —	— —	59	— —	— —	— —	— —	— —	— —	— —	— —		His Hand in Mine
"Frankie and Johnny" "Please Don't Stop Loving Me"	1966	25; 45	3 —	— —	— —	40 —	— —	— —	14 —	— —	— —	— —	— —	21 —	RIAA: Gold ("Frankie and Johnny")	Frankie and Johnny (soundtrack)
"Love Letters" "Come What May"	1966	19; 109	38 —	— —	— —	27	— —	20 —	29 —	— —	7 —	— —	— —	6 —		Elvis' Gold Records, Vol. 4
"Spinout" "All That I Am"	1966	40; 41	— 9	— —	— —	30	— —	— —	27 —	— —	— —	— —	— —	— 18		Spinout (soundtrack)
"If Every Day Was Like Christmas" "How Would You Like to Be"	1966	— (Note: "If Every Day Was Like Christmas" reached number 99 on the Record World singles chart, and 39 on the Gavin airplay chart.) —	— (Note: "If Every Day Was Like Christmas" reached number 2 on the Billboard Christmas Singles Chart in 1966.) —	— —	— —	92 —	— —	— —	— —	— —	9 —	— —	— —	9 —		Elvis Christmas Album (1970 RCA Camden reissue)
"Indescribably Blue" "Fools Fall in Love"	1967	33; 102	— —	— —	— —	13	— —	— —	20 —	— —	— —	— —	— —	21 —		Elvis' Gold Records, Vol. 4
"You Gotta Stop" (Note: "You Gotta Stop" was not released as a single in the US, but was released in the UK.) "The Love Machine"	1967	— —	— —	— —	— —	— —	— —	— —	— —	— —	— —	— —	— —	38		I Got Lucky
"Long Legged Girl (with the Short Dress On)" "That's Someone You Never Forget"	1967	63; 92	— —	— —	— —	38 —	— —	— —	47 —	— —	— —	— —	— —	49 —		Double Trouble (soundtrack)
"There's Always Me" "Judy"	1967	56; 78	— —	— —	— —	5	— —	— —	39 —	— —	— —	— —	— —	— —		Something for Everybody
"Big Boss Man" "You Don't Know Me"	1967	38; 44	— 34	— —	— —	24	— —	— —	39 —	— —	— —	— —	— —	51		Clambake (soundtrack)
"Guitar Man" "High Heel Sneakers"	1968	43 — (Note: "Hi-Heel Sneakers" reached 69 on the Cash Box and 78 on the Record World singles charts.)	— —	— —	— —	26	— —	— —	36 —	— —	— —	— —	— —	19 —		Clambake (soundtrack)
"U.S. Male" "Stay Away"	1968	28; 67	— —	55 —	— —	12	— —	— —	10 —	— —	12 —	— —	— —	15 —		Almost in Love
"You'll Never Walk Alone" "We Call on Him"	1968	90; 106	— —	73 (Note: "You'll Never Walk Alone" reached number 73 on the Billboard Hot Country Singles Chart in 1982.) —	— —	79 —	— —	— —	55 —	— —	— —	— —	— —	44 —		You'll Never Walk Alone
"Let Yourself Go" "Your Time Hasn't Come Yet, Baby"	1968	71; 72	— —	— 50	— —	19	— —	— —	42 —	— —	— —	— —	— —	— 22		Speedway (soundtrack)
"A Little Less Conversation" "Almost in Love"	1968	69; 95	— —	— —	— —	64	— —	— —	25 —	— —	— —	— —	— —	— —		Almost in Love
"If I Can Dream" "Edge of Reality"	1968	12; 112	— —	— —	— —	2	— —	— —	6 —	— —	13 (Note: 1. 27 in 2007) —	20 (Note: 2007) —	— —	11 —	RIAA: Gold ("If I Can Dream"); BPI: Platinum ("If I Can Dream")	Elvis (NBC TV Special)
"Memories" "Charro"	1969	35 —	7 —	56 —	— —	19 —	— —	— —	15 —	— —	— —	— —	— —	— —		Elvis (NBC TV Special)
"How Great Thou Art" "His Hand in Mine"	1969	105 —	— —	— —	— —	— —	— —	— —	— —	— —	— —	— —	— —	— —		How Great Thou Art
"In the Ghetto" "Any Day Now"	1969	3 (Note: "In the Ghetto" reached number 1 on the Cashbox and Record World singles charts.) —	8 —	60 —	— —	1 —	6 —	1 —	2 —	1 —	1 (Note: 1. 34 in 2007) —	4 —	1 —	2 —	RIAA: Platinum ("In the Ghetto"); BPI: Platinum ("In the Ghetto"); RMNZ: Platinum ("In the Ghetto")	From Elvis in Memphis
"Clean Up Your Own Back Yard" "The Fair Is Moving On"	1969	35 —	37 —	74 —	— —	27 —	— —	— —	23 —	— —	— —	— —	— —	21 —	RIAA: Gold ("Clean Up Your Own Backyard")	Almost in Love
"Suspicious Minds" "You'll Think of Me"	1969	1 —	4 —	— —	— —	1 —	13 —	1 —	1 —	7 —	2 (Note: 1. 21 in 2001) —	4 —	10 —	2 —	RIAA: Platinum ("Suspicious Minds"); BPI: 2× Platinum ("Suspicious Minds"); RMNZ: 2× Platinum ("Suspicious Minds")	Worldwide 50 Gold Award Hits, Vol. 1
"Don't Cry Daddy" "Rubberneckin'"	1969	6	3 —	13 —	— —	3	— (Note: 1. 23 in 2003)	2 —	4	14 —	4 —	19 —	4 —	8 —	RIAA: Platinum ("Don't Cry, Daddy")	Worldwide 50 Gold Award Hits, Vol. 1
"—" denotes singles which were not released in that country or failed to chart.

=== 1970s ===
Title (A-side/B-side)	Year	Peak chart positions													Certifications	A-side first album release
Title (A-side/B-side)	Year	US	US AC	US Ctry.	AUS	AUT	BEL (FLA)	CAN	GER	IRE	NL	NZ	NOR	UK	Certifications	A-side first album release
"Kentucky Rain" "My Little Friend"	1970	16 —	3 —	31 —	9 —	— —	— —	10; 94	40 —	14 —	— —	— —	— —	21 —		Worldwide 50 Gold Award Hits, Vol. 1
"The Wonder of You" (Live) "Mama Liked the Roses"	1970	9	1 —	37 —	3 —	— —	13 —	7 —	22 —	1 (Note: 1. 20 in 2005) —	25 (Note: 2005) —	— —	— —	1 —	RIAA: Gold ("The Wonder of You"); BPI: Gold ("The Wonder of You")	On Stage
"I've Lost You" "The Next Step Is Love"	1970	32	5	57 —	6	— —	8 —	10 —	40 —	15 —	— —	— —	— —	9 —	RIAA: Gold ("I've Lost You")	That's the Way It Is
"You Don't Have to Say You Love Me" "Patch It Up"	1970	11	1 —	56 —	7	— —	13 —	10 —	— —	17 (Note: 1. 29 in 2007) —	51 (Note: 2007) —	— —	— —	9 —	RIAA: Gold ("You Don't Have to Say You Love Me")	That's the Way It Is
"I Really Don't Want to Know" "There Goes My Everything"	1970	21	2	23; 9	13	— —	28 —	9	— —	— —	— —	— —	— —	— 6	RIAA: Gold ("I Really Don't Want to Know")	Elvis Country (I'm 10,000 Years Old)
"Rags to Riches" "Where Did They Go, Lord"	1971	33	— 18	— 55	34	— —	— —	— 21	— —	12 —	— —	— —	— —	9 —		He Walks Beside Me
"Life" "Only Believe"	1971	53	8 —	34 —	44	— —	— —	41 —	— —	— —	— —	— —	— —	— —		Love Letters from Elvis
"I'm Leavin'" "Heart of Rome"	1971	36 —	2 —	— —	83	— —	— —	33 —	— —	— —	— —	— —	— —	23 —		Elvis Aron Presley
"It's Only Love" "The Sound of Your Cry"	1971	51 —	19	— —	59 —	— —	— —	46 —	— —	— —	— —	— —	— —	— —	BPI: Silver ("It's Only Love")	Elvis Aron Presley
"Merry Christmas Baby" "O Come, All Ye Faithful"	1971	— —	— —	— —	— —	— —	— —	— —	— —	— —	— —	— —	— —	— —		Elvis Sings the Wonderful World of Christmas
"I Just Can't Help Believin'" (Live) (Note: "I Just Can't Help Believin'" was not released as a single in the US, but was released in the UK and various other countries.) "How the Web Was Woven"	1971	— —	— —	— —	— —	— —	8 —	— —	— —	12 —	5 —	— —	— —	6 —		That's the Way It Is
"Until It's Time for You to Go" "We Can Make the Morning"	1972	40 —	9	68 —	90 —	— —	— —	37 —	— —	— —	— —	— —	— —	5 —		Elvis Now
"He Touched Me" "The Bosom of Abraham"	1972	— —	— —	— —	— —	— —	— —	— —	— —	— —	— —	— —	— —	— —		He Touched Me
"An American Trilogy" (Live) (Note: BPI: Silver) "The First Time Ever I Saw Your Face"	1972	66 —	31 —	— —	— —	— —	— —	— —	— —	— (Note: 1. 38 in 2007) —	61 (Note: 2007) —	— —	— —	8 —	BPI: Gold ("An American Trilogy")	Elvis Aron Presley
"Burning Love" "It's a Matter of Time"	1972	2 (Note: "Burning Love" reached number 1 on the Cashbox singles chart.) —	9	— (Note: "Burning Love" reached number 23 on the Cash Box Country singles chart.); 36	3 (Note: 1. 37 in 2007) —	— —	17 —	2 —	31 —	6 (Note: 1. 29 in 2007) —	17 —	— —	— —	7 —	RIAA: Platinum ("Burning Love"); BPI: 2x Platinum ("Burning Love"); RMNZ: Platinum ("Burning Love")	Burning Love and Hits from His Movies, Vol. 2
"Separate Ways" "Always on My Mind" (Note: BPI: Platinum)	1972	20 —	3 —	— (Note: "Separate Ways" reached number 30 on the Cash Box and 19 on the Record World Country singles charts.); 16	8 —	— —	27 —	27 —	— —	— 9 (Note: 1. 27 in 2007)	— 17 (Note: 1997)	— —	— —	— 9	RIAA: Gold ("Separate Ways"); BPI: Platinum ("Always On My Mind"); RMNZ: Gold ("Always On My Mind")	Separate Ways
"Steamroller Blues" (Live) "Fool"	1973	17	— —	— 31	17; 21	— —	— —	15	— —	— 8	— —	— —	— —	— 15		Aloha from Hawaii Via Satellite
"Polk Salad Annie" (Live) (Note: "Polk Salad Annie" was not released as a single in the US, but was released in the UK and various other European countries.) "C.C. Rider"	1973	— —	— —	— —	— —	— —	— —	— —	— —	16 —	— —	— —	— —	23 —		On Stage
"Raised on Rock" "For Ol' Times Sake"	1973	41	27 —	— 42	37 —	— —	— —	55	— —	— —	— —	— —	— —	36 —		Raised on Rock / For Ol' Times Sake
"Take Good Care of Her" "I've Got a Thing About You, Baby"	1974	39	27	— (Note: "Take Good Care of Her" reached number 8 on the Record World Country singles chart.); 4	43	— —	— —	27	— —	— 20	— —	— —	— —	— 33		Good Times
"If You Talk in Your Sleep" "Help Me"	1974	17 —	6 —	— 6	37	— —	— —	19 —	— —	— —	— —	— —	— —	40 —		Promised Land
"Promised Land" "It's Midnight"	1974	14 —	8	— 9	41	— —	— —	19	— —	7 —	— —	— —	— —	9 —		Promised Land
"My Boy" (Note: BPI: Silver) "Thinking About You"	1975	20 —	1 —	14 —	10 —	— —	3 —	21 —	— —	4 —	9 —	12 —	— —	5 —	BPI: Silver ("My Boy")	Good Times
"T-R-O-U-B-L-E" "Mr. Songman"	1975	35 —	42 —	11 —	43 —	— —	— —	26 —	— —	— —	— —	— —	— —	31 —		Today
"Bringing It Back" "Pieces of My Life"	1975	65 —	— —	— 33	— —	— —	— —	91 —	— —	— —	— —	— —	— —	— —		Today
"Green Green Grass of Home" (Note: "Green Green Grass of Home" was not released as a single in the US, but was released in the UK and several others countries.) "Thinking About You"	1975	— —	— —	— —	— —	— —	— —	— —	— —	— —	— —	— —	— —	29 —		Today
"For the Heart" "Hurt"	1976	28	— 7	45; 6	— —	— —	— —	— 45	— —	— —	— —	— —	— —	— 37		From Elvis Presley Boulevard, Memphis, Tennessee
"Moody Blue" "She Thinks I Still Care"	1976	31	2 —	1 —	17 —	— —	4 —	57 —	— —	7 —	10 —	5 —	6 —	6 —		Moody Blue
"Way Down" "Pledging My Love"	1977	18 —	14 —	1 —	6	19 —	17 —	15 —	15 —	1 (Note: 1. 19 in 2005) —	10 —	7 —	11 —	1 —	RIAA: Platinum; BPI: Gold ("Way Down"); MC: Gold ("Way Down")	Moody Blue
"—" denotes singles which were not released in that country or failed to chart.

=== Posthumous singles ===
Title (A-side/B-side)	Year	Peak chart positions													Certifications	A-side first album release
Title (A-side/B-side)	Year	US	US AC	US Ctry.	AUS	AUT	BEL (FLA)	CAN	GER	IRE	NL	NZ	NOR	UK	Certifications	A-side first album release
"My Way" (Live) "America"	1977	22 —	6 —	2 (Note: "My Way" reached number 1 on the Cashbox Country Singles chart.) —	63 —	— —	— —	32 —	— —	6 —	30; 55 (Note: 2001)	— —	— —	9 —	RIAA: Gold ("My Way"); BPI: Silver ("My Way"); MC: Platinum ("My Way")	Elvis in Concert
"Unchained Melody" (Live) "Softly, as I Leave You"	1978	— 109	— —	6 — (Note: "Softy, as I Leave You" reached number 6 on the Record World Country singles chart.)	52	— —	— —	(Note: MC: Gold)— —	— —	— —	— —	— —	— —	— —	MC: Gold ("Unchained Melody")	Elvis Aron Presley
"Are You Sincere" (Remix) "Solitaire"	1979	— —	— —	10 —	— —	— —	— —	— —	— —	— —	— —	— —	— —	— —		Our Memories of Elvis
"I Got a Feelin' in My Body" (Remix) "There's a Honky Tonk Angel (Who Will Take Me Back In)"	1979	— —	— —	— 6	— —	— —	— —	— —	— —	— —	— —	— —	— —	— —		Our Memories of Elvis, Vol. 2
"It Won't Seem Like Christmas (Without You)" (Note: "It Won't Seem Like Christmas (Without You)" was not released as a single in the US, but was released in other countries.) "Merry Christmas Baby"	1979	— —	— —	— —	— —	— —	— —	— —	— —	— —	— —	— —	— —	13 —		Elvis Sings the Wonderful World of Christmas
"Guitar Man" (Remix) "Faded Love"	1981	28 —	16 —	1 —	73 —	— —	— —	— —	— —	— —	39 —	— —	— —	43 —		Guitar Man
"Lovin' Arms" (Remix) "You Asked Me To"	1981	— —	— —	8 —	— —	— —	— —	— —	— —	— —	— —	— —	— —	47 —		Guitar Man
"Are You Lonesome Tonight?" (The Laughing Version) (Live) (Note: This live version of "Are You Lonesome Tonight?" was not released as a single in the US, but was released in the UK and various other countries.) "From a Jack to a King"	1982	— —	— —	— —	41 —	— —	20 —	— —	— —	16 —	14 —	— —	— —	25 —		The Sound of Your Cry
"The Elvis Medley" "Always on My Mind"	1982	71 —	31 —	31 —	48 —	— —	30 —	42 —	— —	— —	— —	— —	— —	51 —		The Elvis Medley
"I Was the One" (Remix) "Wear My Ring Around Your Neck"	1983	— —	— —	92 —	— —	— —	— —	— —	— —	— —	— —	— —	— —	— —		I Was the One
"Baby, I Don't Care" (Note: "Baby, I Don't Care" was not released as a single in the US, but was released in the UK.) "True Love"	1983	— —	— —	— —	— —	— —	— —	— —	— —	— —	— —	— —	— —	61 —		I Was the One
"Little Sister" (Remix) "Paralyzed"	1983	— —	— —	— —	— —	— —	— —	— —	— —	— —	— —	— —	— —	— —		I Was the One
"I Can Help" (Note: "I Can Help" was not released as a single in the US, but was released in the UK and several other countries.) "The Lady Loves Me"	1983	— —	— —	— —	— —	— —	— —	— —	— —	29 —	— —	— —	— —	30 —		Today
"Always on My Mind" (Alternate Version) "My Boy"	1985	— —	— —	— —	— —	— —	— —	— —	— —	— —	— —	— —	— —	59 —		Always on My Mind
"Mean Woman Blues" (Take 14) (Note: This version of "Mean Woman Blues" was not released in the US, but was released in the UK and several other countries.) "I Beg of You"	1989	— —	— —	— —	— —	— —	— —	— —	— —	— —	— —	— —	— —	83 —		Stereo '57: Essential Elvis, Vol. 2
"The Twelfth of Never" (Informal Rehearsal) "Walk a Mile in My Shoes" / "Burning Love"	1995	— —	— —	— —	— —	— —	— —	— —	— —	— —	— —	— —	— —	21 —		Walk a Mile in My Shoes: The Essential '70s Masters
"Suspicious Minds" (Live)	2001	—	—	—	— —	—	—	—	—	—	30	—	—	15		Elvis Presley: The Live Greatest Hits
"A Little Less Conversation" (JXL Remix)	2002	50	— (Note: "A Little Less Conversation" reached 26 on the Billboard Adult Top 40 chart and number 1 on the Single Sales chart.)	—	1	3	3	1	8	1	1	—	1	1	RIAA: Gold; ARIA: 2× Platinum; Recorded Music NZ: Gold; BRMA: Gold; NVPI: Gp;d; IFPI Austria: Gold; IFPI Norway: 2x Platinum	ELV1S: 30 No. 1 Hits
"Rubberneckin'" (Paul Oakenfold Remix)	2003	94	— (Note: "Rubbernekin" reached number 1 on the Single Sales and Hot Dance Single Sales charts.)	—	3	—	17	2	51	10	4	18	11	5	ARIA: Platinum	ELVIS: 2nd to None
"Bridge Over Troubled Waters"	2004	—	—	—	—	—	—	—	—	—	—	—	—		BPI: Silver	
"In the Ghetto" (with Lisa Marie Presley)	2007	116	—	—	—	—	—	68	—	—	—	—	—	—		Non-album single
"Baby Let's Play House" (Spankox Re:Version)	2008	—	—	—	—	—	—	—	—	—	—	—	—	84		Elvis vs Spankox
"I'll Be Home for Christmas" (with Carrie Underwood)	2008	—	14	54	—	—	—	—	—	—	—	—	—	—		Christmas Duets
"Blue Christmas" (with Martina McBride)	2008	—	22	36	—	—	—	—	—	—	—	—	—	—		Christmas Duets
"Love Me Tender 2010" (with Lisa Lois)	2010	—	—	—	—	—	—	—	—	—	85	—	—	—		Non-album single
"Pocketful of Rainbows" (Spankox Remix) (Note: "Pocketful of Rainbows" was not released as a single in the US, but was released in the Netherlands in 2011.)	2011	—	—	—	—	—	—	—	—	39 (Note: 2010)	32	—	—	—		The Real... Elvis: The Ultimate Elvis Presley Collection
"I Love You Because" (with Lisa Marie Presley)	2012	—	—	—	—	—	—	—	—	—	—	—	—	—		Non-album single
"O Come, All Ye Faithful" (with Susan Boyle)	2013	—	—	—	—	—	—	—	—	—	—	—	—	48		Home for Christmas
"If I Can Dream"	2015	—	—	—	—	—	—	—	—	—	—	—	—	—		If I Can Dream (with the Royal Philharmonic Orchestra)
"Fever" (featuring Michael Bublé)	2015	—	—	—	—	—	—	—	—	—	—	—	—	—		If I Can Dream (with the Royal Philharmonic Orchestra)
"You've Lost That Lovin' Feelin'"	2015	—	—	—	—	—	—	—	—	—	—	—	—	—		If I Can Dream (with the Royal Philharmonic Orchestra)
"An American Trilogy"	2015	—	—	—	—	—	—	—	—	—	—	—	—	—		If I Can Dream (with the Royal Philharmonic Orchestra)
"And the Grass Won't Pay No Mind"	2015	—	—	—	—	—	—	—	—	—	—	—	—	—		If I Can Dream (with the Royal Philharmonic Orchestra)
"Burning Love"	2015	—	—	—	—	—	—	—	—	—	—	—	—	—		If I Can Dream (with the Royal Philharmonic Orchestra)
"Blue Christmas" (with Kane Brown)	2023	—	—	—	—	—	—	—	—	—	—	—	—	—	RIAA: Gold	Non-album single
"—" denotes singles which were not released in that country or failed to chart.

=== Charted reissued singles ===
Title	Year	Peak chart positions				In promotion of
Title	Year	AUS	BEL (FLA)	IRE	UK	In promotion of
"Heartbreak Hotel" / "Hound Dog"	1971	—	—	—	10	—N/a
"Jailhouse Rock"	1974	—	9	—	—	—N/a
"The Girl of My Best Friend"	1976	—	—	—	9	—N/a
"Suspicion"	1976	—	7	5	9	—N/a
"Wooden Heart"	1977	—	5	—	—	—N/a
"All Shook Up"	1977	—	—	—	41	Presley Gold: 16 Number Ones
"Jailhouse Rock"	1977	—	—	—	44	Presley Gold: 16 Number Ones
"It's Now or Never"	1977	—	—	—	39	Presley Gold: 16 Number Ones
"Are You Lonesome Tonight?"	1977	—	—	—	46	Presley Gold: 16 Number Ones
"Return to Sender"	1977	—	—	—	42	Presley Gold: 16 Number Ones
"Crying in the Chapel"	1977	—	—	—	43	Presley Gold: 16 Number Ones
"The Wonder of You" (Live)	1977	—	—	—	48	Presley Gold: 16 Number Ones
"Don't Be Cruel"	1978	—	—	—	24	Elvis: The '56 Sessions, Vol. 1
"It's Only Love" (Note: BPI: Silver) / "Beyond the Reef"	1980	—	—	—	3	Elvis Aron Presley
"Santa Claus Is Back in Town"	1980	—	—	25	41	—N/a
"The Sound of Your Cry"	1982	—	—	—	59	The Sound of Your Cry
"Green Green Grass of Home"	1984	—	—	—	76	I Can Help and Other Great Hits
"The Last Farewell"	1984	—	—	—	48	Elvis Presley: A Golden Celebration
"Ain't That Loving You Baby"	1987	—	—	—	47	—N/a
"Love Me Tender"	1987	—	—	—	56	Presley: The All Time Greatest Hits
"Stuck on You"	1988	—	—	—	58	Presley: The All Time Greatest Hits
"Are You Lonesome Tonight?" (The Laughing Version) (Live)	1991	—	—	—	68	Collector's Gold
"Jailhouse Rock"	1994	—	—	—	—	Dutch Elvis Presley Fanclub, It's Elvis Time
"Heartbreak Hotel"	1996	—	—	—	45	Elvis '56
"Always on My Mind"	1997	—	—	—	—	Always on My Mind: The Ultimate Love Songs Collection
"Suspicious Minds"	1999	—	—	—	—	Elvis Presley: Artist of the Century
"America the Beautiful"	2001	—	—	—	69	September 11, 2001, attacks American Red Cross Liberty Disaster Relief Fund
"Burning Love"	2002	—	—	—	—	ELV1S: 30#1 Hits
"That's All Right"	2004	31	—	33	3	Elvis at Sun
"Jailhouse Rock"	2005	—	—	23	1	18 UK #1s (Note: All Shook Up came with a box, making it ineligible to chart.)
"One Night"	2005	—	—	15	1	18 UK #1s
"(Now and Then There's) A Fool Such as I"	2005	—	—	28	2	18 UK #1s
"It's Now or Never"	2005	—	—	6	1	18 UK #1s
"Are You Lonesome Tonight?"	2005	—	—	24	2	18 UK #1s
"Wooden Heart"	2005	—	—	22	2	18 UK #1s
"Surrender"	2005	—	—	25	2	18 UK #1s
"(Marie's the Name) His Latest Flame"	2005	—	—	21	3	18 UK #1s
"Rock-a-Hula Baby"	2005	—	—	19	3	18 UK #1s
"Good Luck Charm"	2005	—	—	42	2	18 UK #1s
"She's Not You"	2005	—	—	37	3	18 UK #1s
"Return to Sender"	2005	—	—	41	5	18 UK #1s
"(You're the) Devil in Disguise"	2005	—	—	31	2	18 UK #1s
"Crying in the Chapel"	2005	—	—	26	2	18 UK #1s
"The Wonder of You" (Live)	2005	—	—	20	4	18 UK #1s
"Way Down"	2005	—	—	19	2	18 UK #1s
"A Little Less Conversation"	2005	—	—	—	3	18 UK #1s
"Heartbreak Hotel"	2006	—	—	19	—	"Heartbreak Hotel" 50th Anniversary
"My Baby Left Me"	2007	—	—	49	19	—N/a
"Suspicious Minds"	2007	—	—	—	11	18 of the Greatest Singles Ever (Note: Heartbreak Hotel came with a box, making it ineligible to chart.)
"Blue Suede Shoes"	2007	—	—	24	13	18 of the Greatest Singles Ever
"Hound Dog"	2007	—	—	25	14	18 of the Greatest Singles Ever
"(Let Me Be Your) Teddy Bear"	2007	—	—	24	14	18 of the Greatest Singles Ever
"Party"	2007	—	—	27	14	18 of the Greatest Singles Ever
"Don't"	2007	—	—	27	14	18 of the Greatest Singles Ever
"Hard Headed Woman"	2007	—	—	26	15	18 of the Greatest Singles Ever
"King Creole"	2007	—	—	23	15	18 of the Greatest Singles Ever
"A Big Hunk o' Love"	2007	—	—	23	12	18 of the Greatest Singles Ever
"Wear My Ring Around Your Neck"	2007	—	—	25	16	18 of the Greatest Singles Ever
"If I Can Dream"	2007	—	—	27	17	18 of the Greatest Singles Ever
"Viva Las Vegas"	2007	—	—	31	15	18 of the Greatest Singles Ever
"In the Ghetto"	2007	—	—	—	13	18 of the Greatest Singles Ever
"You Don't Have to Say You Love Me"	2007	—	—	29	16	18 of the Greatest Singles Ever
"Always On My Mind"	2007	—	—	—	17	18 of the Greatest Singles Ever
"An American Trilogy" (Live)	2007	—	—	38	12	18 of the Greatest Singles Ever
"Burning Love"	2007	—	—	29	13	18 of the Greatest Singles Ever
"—" denotes singles which were not released in that country or failed to chart.

=== Billboard Year-End performances ===
Year	Song	Year-End Position
1956	"Heartbreak Hotel"	1
1956	"Don't Be Cruel"	2
1956	"Hound Dog"	6
1956	"I Want You, I Need You, I Love You"	14
1956	"Love Me Tender"	15
1957	"All Shook Up"	1
1957	"Too Much"	9
1957	"(Let Me Be Your) Teddy Bear"	14
1957	"Jailhouse Rock"	16
1958	"Don't" / "I Beg of You"	3
1958	"Wear My Ring Around Your Neck" / "Doncha' Think It's Time"	22
1958	"Hard Headed Woman" / "Don't Ask Me Why"	49
1959	"A Big Hunk o' Love"	30
1959	"(Now and Then There's) A Fool Such as I"	34
1959	"I Need Your Love Tonight"	44
1959	"My Wish Came True"	93
1960	"It's Now or Never"	7
1960	"Stuck on You"	9
1961	"Little Sister"	39
1961	"Surrender"	51
1961	"(Marie's the Name) His Latest Flame"	71
1961	"Are You Lonesome Tonight?"	96
1962	"Good Luck Charm"	20
1962	"Can't Help Falling in Love"	57
1963	"(You're the) Devil in Disguise"	58
1965	"Crying in the Chapel"	9
1969	"Suspicious Minds"	18
1969	"In the Ghetto"	35
1970	"The Wonder of You"	72
1972	"Burning Love"	48
1977	"Way Down"	64

== Other charted songs ==
Title	Year	Peak chart positions								Certifications	Original album release
Title	Year	US	US AC	US Ctry.	US R&B	BEL (FLA)	CAN	IRE	NL	Certifications	Original album release
"Love Me"	1956	2	—	10	7	—	—	—	—		Elvis
"Old Shep"	1956	47	—	—	—	—	—	—	—		Elvis
"Poor Boy"	1956	35	—	—	—	—	—	—	—		For LP Fans Only
"(There'll Be) Peace in the Valley (For Me)"	1957	25	—	— (Note: "Peace in the Valley" reached number 33 on the Music Vendor Country singles chart.)	—	—	—	—	—		Elvis' Christmas Album
"Here Comes Santa Claus"	1957	—	—	—	—	—	—	81 (Note: 2022)	67 (Note: 2022)	BPI: Silver	Elvis' Christmas Album
"Mean Woman Blues"	1957	—	—	11	11	—	—	—	—		Loving You (soundtrack)
"(You're So Square) Baby I Don't Care"	—	—	—	14	—	—	–	—	—		A Date with Elvis
"Lover Doll"	1958	— (Note: "Lover Doll" was not released as a single in the US but reached number 2 on the Gavin airplay chart.)	—	—	—	—	—	—	—		King Creole (soundtrack)
"Trouble"	1958	— (Note: "Trouble" was not released as a single in the US but reached number 4 on the Gavin airplay chart.)	—	—	—	—	—	—	—		King Creole (soundtrack)
"Crawfish"	1958	— (Note: "Crawfish" was not released as a single in the US but reached number 5 on the Gavin airplay chart.)	—	—	—	—	—	—	—		King Creole (soundtrack)
"Young Dreams"	1958	— (Note: "Young Dreams" was not released as a single in the US but reached number 9 on the Gavin airplay chart.)	—	—	—	—	—	—	—		King Creole (soundtrack)
"Fever"	1960	— (Note: "Fever" was not released as a single in the US but reached number 28 on the Gavin airplay chart.)	—	—	—	—	—	—	—		Elvis Is Back!
"Such a Night"	1960	— (Note: "Such a Night" was not released as a single in the US but reached number 24 on the Gavin airplay chart.)	—	—	—	—	—	—	—		Elvis Is Back!
"G.I. Blues"	1960	— (Note: "G.I. Blues" was not released as a single in the US but reached number 5 on the Gavin airplay chart.)	—	—	—	—	—	—	—		G.I. Blues
"Flaming Star"	1961	14	—	—	—	—	—	—	—		Elvis by Request: Flaming Star and 3 Other Great Songs
"Follow That Dream"	1962	15	5	—	—	46	—	—	—		Follow That Dream
"Today, Tomorrow and Forever"	1964	—	—	—	—	—	5	—	—		Viva Las Vegas
"Night Rider"	1965	—	—	—	—	29	—	—	—		Tickle Me
"Bridge Over Troubled Water"	1970	—	—	—	—	—	—	—	—	BPI: Silver	That's The Way It Is

== RIAA certifications ==
The Recording Industry Association of America (RIAA) began to certify gold albums and singles in 1958, and Elvis Presley's first RIAA award, a gold single for "Hard Headed Woman", was certified on August 11, 1958. In August 1992, he was awarded with 110 gold, platinum and multi-platinum albums and singles, the largest presentation of gold and platinum record awards in history. According to reliable sources, Elvis Presley has sold up to 500 million records worldwide and is one of the best selling artists of all time.

The RIAA does not certify sales of less than 500,000 units for albums and singles. Elvis has had numerous albums and singles which have sold hundreds of thousands of units each but have not reached the 500,000 threshold. Taken together, these could add up to millions in total sales that are not recognized by the RIAA.

RIAA sales certifications are not automatic. The record company must pay a fee and request an audit from the RIAA in order to certify sales. During Presley's life, RCA submitted few of his recordings for RIAA certification. Instead of paying for RIAA certification, RCA and other companies would simply award their own "Gold Record" to artists based on their internal sales figures. As a consequence, some of Presley's early sales information has been lost. RCA and BMG have researched archives and old files in an effort to reconstruct Presley's sales figures. This has led to Presley receiving numerous RIAA certifications posthumously.

Title	Year	Highest award	Certification date
"That's All Right"	1954	Gold	June 25, 2009
"Good Rockin' Tonight"	1954	Gold	January 6, 2005
"Heartbreak Hotel" (Note: BPI: Silver) / "I Was the One" (Note: BPI: Silver)	1956	2× Platinum	July 15, 1999
"I Want You, I Need You, I Love You"	1956	Platinum	March 27, 1992
"Hound Dog" (Note: BPI: Gold) / "Don't Be Cruel" (Note: BPI: Silver)	1956	4× Platinum	July 15, 1999
"Blue Suede Shoes" (Note: BPI: Silver) / "Tutti Frutti"	1956	Gold	July 15, 1999
"Love Me Tender" (Note: BPI: Silver) / "Any Way You Want Me (That's How I Will Be)"	1956	3× Platinum	July 15, 1999
"Too Much"	1957	Platinum	March 27, 1992
"All Shook Up" (Note: BPI: Silver)	1957	2× Platinum	March 27, 1992
"(Let Me Be You) Teddy Bear" / "Loving You"	1957	2× Platinum	July 15, 1999
"Jailhouse Rock" (Note: BPI: Platinum) (Note: BVMI: Gold)	1957	2× Platinum	March 27, 1992
"Don't"	1958	Platinum	March 27, 1992
"Wear My Ring Around Your Neck"	1958	Platinum	March 27, 1992
"Hard Headed Woman"	1958	Platinum	March 27, 1992
"I Got Stung"	1958	Platinum	March 27, 1992
"(Now and Then There's) A Fool Such as I"	1959	Platinum	March 27, 1992
"A Big Hunk o' Love"	1959	Gold	March 27, 1992
"Stuck on You"	1960	Platinum	March 27, 1992
"It's Now or Never" (Note: BPI: Silver)	1960	Platinum	March 27, 1992
"Are You Lonesome Tonight?" (Note: BPI: Silver)	1960	2× Platinum	March 27, 1992
"Surrender"	1961	Platinum	March 27, 1992
"I Feel So Bad"	1961	Gold	March 27, 1992
"(Marie's the Name) His Latest Flame" (Note: BPI: Silver)	1961	Gold	March 27, 1992
"Can't Help Falling in Love" (Note: BPI: Platinum 3X) (Note: BVMI: Gold)	1961	Platinum	March 27, 1992
"Good Luck Charm"	1962	Platinum	March 27, 1992
"She's Not You"	1962	Gold	March 27, 1992
"Return to Sender" (Note: BPI: Gold)	1962	Platinum	March 27, 1992
"One Broken Heart for Sale"	1963	Gold	March 27, 1992
"(You're the) Devil in Disguise" (Note: BPI: Gold)	1963	Gold	March 27, 1992
"Bossa Nova Baby"	1963	Gold	March 27, 1992
"Kissin' Cousins"	1964	Gold	March 27, 1992
"Viva Las Vegas" (Note: BPI: Silver)	1964	Gold	March 27, 1992
"Ain't That Loving You, Baby?"	1964	Gold	March 27, 1992
"Crying in the Chapel"	1965	Platinum	March 27, 1992
"I'm Yours"	1965	Gold	March 27, 1992
"Puppet on a String"	1965	Gold	March 27, 1992
"Blue Christmas" (Note: BPI: Platinum) (Note: ARIA: Gold) / "Santa Claus Is Back in Town"	1965	Platinum	July 15, 1999
"Tell Me Why"	1965	Gold	March 27, 1992
"Frankie and Johnny"	1966	Gold	March 27, 1992
"If I Can Dream" (Note: BPI: Platinum)	1968	Gold	March 27, 1992
"In the Ghetto" (Note: BPI: Platinum)	1969	Platinum	March 27, 1992
"Clean Up Your Own Backyard"	1969	Gold	March 27, 1992
"Suspicious Minds" (Note: BPI: Platinum 2X)	1969	Platinum	March 27, 1992
"Don't Cry, Daddy"	1969	Platinum	March 27, 1992
"Kentucky Rain"	1970	Gold	March 27, 1992
"The Wonder of You" (Note: BPI: Gold)	1970	Gold	August 14, 1970
"I've Lost You"	1970	Gold	March 27, 1992
"You Don't Have to Say You Love Me"	1970	Gold	March 27, 1992
"I Really Don't Want to Know"	1970	Gold	March 27, 1992
"Burning Love" (Note: BPI: Platinum)	1972	Platinum	March 27, 1992
"Separate Ways"	1972	Gold	March 27, 1992
"Way Down" (Note: BPI: Gold) (Note: MC: Gold) / "Pledging My Love"	1977	Platinum	July 15, 1999
"My Way" (Note: BPI: Silver) (Note: MC: Platinum)	1977	Gold	January 13, 1978
"A Little Less Conversation" (Note: ARIA: Platinum 2X) (JXL Radio Edit Remix)	2002	Gold (digital)	March 31, 2006
"Blue Christmas" (with Kane Brown)	2023	Gold (digital)	April 14, 2025

== See also ==
- List of songs recorded by Elvis Presley
- Elvis Presley albums discography
