= Steamroller (disambiguation) =

Steamroller may refer to:

- Steamroller, a road-building vehicle, originally powered by steam
- Road roller, a more generic term for the same vehicle
- "Steamroller" a 1962 story of The Railway Series book Gallant Old Engine
- "Steamroller", a usually cylindrical waterless bong, a type of tobacco pipe.

== Others ==
- "Steamroller Blues", the song by James Taylor
- Steam Roller, the name used by the Yugoslav rock band Parni Valjak during their brief venture on the international scene
- Steamroller (microarchitecture), the AMD computer microarchitecture
- Steam-Roller (G.I. Joe), the G.I. Joe character
- Providence Steam Roller, a former National Football League team
- Providence Steamrollers, a former National Basketball Association team
