= Elvis Recorded Live on Stage in Memphis =

Live album by Elvis Presley
- Released: July 8, 1974
- Recorded: March 20, 1974
- Venue: Mid-South Coliseum; Memphis, Tennessee
- Genre: Rock, gospel
- Length: 41:57
- Label: RCA Victor

Elvis Presley chronology
Good Times (1974)	Elvis Recorded Live on Stage in Memphis (1974)	Having Fun with Elvis on Stage (1974)

Elvis Recorded Live on Stage in Memphis is a live album by American singer and musician Elvis Presley, released by RCA Records on July 8, 1974. It was recorded on March 20 of the same year at the Mid-South Coliseum in Memphis, Tennessee, Presley's hometown. The cover features a photograph of Presley's home, Graceland.

Presley earned his third Grammy Award for this album's performance of "How Great Thou Art" (he had previously won for the album of the same title). The album was certified gold by the Recording Industry Association of America on July 15, 1999.

== Content ==
The album was recorded on the same day as his Good Times album was released. Elvis Recorded Live on Stage in Memphis was Presley's fifth live album in less than five years and the last to be issued in his lifetime.

In the United States, Elvis Recorded Live on Stage in Memphis topped Cashbox's Country album chart, reached number 2 on Billboard's Country chart, and reached the top 40 of the Top LPs & Tape listings (now known as the Billboard 200). It was Presley's last album to reach the top 40 until Moody Blue in 1977. Although the live album was not a major commercial success, it did produce the singer's third and final Grammy Award winner, "How Great Thou Art", which won for best inspirational performance. Two other gospel songs, "Why Me Lord" and "Help Me", are given an inspired performance. Another highlight is the Sun years classic "Trying to Get to You", a favorite live choice of Presley's, which suggested that he still had the power to belt it out when he chose to.

The live recording of "Let Me Be There" from this album was later used as filler on Presley's final studio album, Moody Blue. It was also issued as a promotional single in 1974, with the same song on both sides (mono and stereo).

== Reissues ==
In 2004, FTD Records re-released Elvis Recorded Live on Stage in Memphis containing the entire concert, which had included performances of songs such as "Suspicious Minds" and "Polk Salad Annie" that had been omitted from the 1974 LP to avoid repetition with Presley's previous live albums. Moreover, unconvincing fake audience reactions, added in post-production, blighted the 1974 mix but these were stripped off by FTD. On March 17, 2014, close to the 40th anniversary of the concert, Sony/RCA Legacy re-released the album as a two-CD set. Disc one corresponds with the FTD version, in that it features the complete show from the Mid-South Coliseum. The second disc consists of a near-identical concert recorded at the Richmond Coliseum just two days earlier; as it had a similar setlist, this show is known as the "test run" for the Memphis concert, but was recorded only in mono. Disc two also includes several recently rediscovered studio rehearsal recordings from August 1974. On release, the two-CD set re-entered the UK Albums Chart at number 74.

Professional ratings
Review scores
Source	Rating
AllMusic	4/5 stars
Mojo (2014 reissue)	4/5 stars
MusicHound	1.5/5 stars
Rough Guides	3/5 stars

== Track listing ==
=== Original LP release ===
Side one
No.	Title	Writer(s)	Length
1.	"See See Rider"	Traditional, arranged by Elvis Presley	3:03
2.	"Medley: "I Got A Woman" / "Amen"	Ray Charles, Renald Richard	4:45
3.	"Love Me"	Jerry Leiber and Mike Stoller	1:50
4.	"Trying to Get to You"	Rose Marie McCoy, Charles Singleton	2:02
5.	"Medley: "Long Tall Sally" / "Whole Lotta Shakin' Goin' On" "Mama Don't Dance" / "Flip, Flop and Fly" / "Jailhouse Rock" / "Hound Dog"	Enotris Johnson, Robert Blackwell, Penniman / Dave "Curlee" Williams, Sunny David / Kenny Loggins, Jim Messina / Jesse Stone, Lou Willie Turner / Jerry Leiber and Mike Stoller	3:32
6.	"Why Me Lord?"	Kris Kristofferson	2:50
7.	"How Great Thou Art"	Stuart K. Hine	3:44

Side two
No.	Title	Writer(s)	Length
1.	"Medley: Blueberry Hill" "I Can't Stop Loving You"	Al Lewis, Vincent Rose, Larry Stock; Don Gibson	2:59
2.	"Help Me"	Larry Gatlin	2:42
3.	"An American Trilogy"	Mickey Newbury	3:57
4.	"Let Me Be There"	John Rostill	3:33
5.	"My Baby Left Me"	Arthur Crudup	2:22
6.	"Lawdy Miss Clawdy"	Lloyd Price	2:14
7.	"Can't Help Falling in Love"	George David Weiss, Hugo Peretti, Luigi Creatore	1:36
8.	"Closing Vamp"	—	0:47

=== Follow That Dream reissue ===
No.	Title	Length
1.	"Also sprach Zarathustra" (previously unissued)
2.	"See See Rider"
3.	"Medley: I Got A Woman / Amen"
4.	"Love Me"
5.	"Tryin' To Get To You"
6.	"All Shook Up" (previously unissued)
7.	"Steamroller Blues" (previously unissued)
8.	"Medley: Teddy Bear / Don't Be Cruel" (previously unissued)
9.	"Love Me Tender" (previously unissued)
10.	"Medley: Long Tall Sally / Whole Lotta Shakin' Goin' On / Mama Don't Dance / Flip, Flop and Fly / Jailhouse Rock / Hound Dog"
11.	"Fever" (previously unissued)
12.	"Polk Salad Annie" (previously unissued)
13.	"Why Me Lord"

No.	Title	Length
14.	"How Great Thou Art"
15.	"Suspicious Minds" (previously unissued)
16.	"Introductions" (previously unissued)
17.	"Medley: Blueberry Hill / I Can't Stop Loving You"
18.	"Help Me"
19.	"An American Trilogy"
20.	"Let Me Be There"
21.	"My Baby Left Me"
22.	"Lawdy, Miss Clawdy"
23.	"Funny How Time Slips Away" (previously unissued)
24.	"Can't Help Falling In Love"
25.	"Closing Vamp"

=== 2014 reissue ===
==== Disc 1 ====
Same as Follow That Dream 2004 issue

==== Disc 2 ====
Tracks 1–22 recorded live in Richmond.

No.	Title	Length
1.	"Also Sprach Zarathustra"
2.	"See See Rider"
3.	"Medley: I Got a Woman / Amen"
4.	"Love Me"
5.	"Tryin' to Get to You"
6.	"All Shook Up"
7.	"Steamroller Blues"
8.	"Medley: (Let Me Be Your) Teddy Bear / Don't Be Cruel"
9.	"Love Me Tender"
10.	"Medley: Long Tall Sally / Whole Lotta Shakin' Goin' On / Mama Don't Dance / Flip, Flop and Fly / Jailhouse Rock / Hound Dog"
11.	"Fever"
12.	"Polk Salad Annie"
13.	"Why Me Lord"

No.	Title	Length
14.	"Suspicious Minds"
15.	"Introductions"
16.	"I Can't Stop Loving You"
17.	"Help Me"
18.	"An American Trilogy"
19.	"Let Me Be There"
20.	"Funny How Time Slips Away"
21.	"Can't Help Falling in Love"
22.	"Closing Vamp"
23.	"Down in the Alley" (previously unissued rehearsal)
24.	"Good Time Charlie's Got the Blues" (previously unissued rehearsal)
25.	"Softly As I Leave You" (previously unissued rehearsal)
26.	"The First Time Ever I Saw Your Face" (previously unissued rehearsal)
27.	"The Twelfth of Never" (previously unissued rehearsal)

== Personnel ==
- Elvis Presley – vocals, acoustic guitar, executive producer
- James Burton – lead guitar
- Charlie Hodge – acoustic guitar, backing vocals
- John Wilkinson – rhythm guitar
- Glen D. Hardin – piano
- J.D. Sumner and the Stamps – backing vocals
- Kathy Westmoreland – backing vocals
- The Sweet Inspirations – backing vocals
- Duke Bardwell – bass guitar
- Ronnie Tutt – drums

Technical

- Gus Mossler, Larry Schnapf, Mike Moran, Ronnie Olson – engineers
