= Good Times (Elvis Presley album) =

Studio album by Elvis Presley
- Released: March 20, 1974
- Recorded: July 21–22 and December 10–16, 1973
- Studio: Stax Studios, Memphis
- Genre: Country, soft rock
- Length: 29:23
- Label: RCA Victor
- Producer: Felton Jarvis

Elvis Presley chronology
Elvis: A Legendary Performer Volume 1 (1974)	Good Times (1974)	Elvis Recorded Live on Stage in Memphis (1974)

Singles from Good Times
- 1. "I've Got a Thing About You Baby" Released: January 11, 1974; 2. "My Boy" Released: January 3, 1975

Professional ratings
Review scores
Source	Rating
AllMusic	3.5/5 stars
Christgau's Record Guide	B−
Rough Guides	3/5 stars

Good Times is the twentieth studio album by American singer and musician Elvis Presley, released on March 20, 1974. The album was constructed by the first pick of a session held at Stax Studios in Memphis in December 1973 and two songs, "I've Got a Thing About You Baby" and "Take Good Care of Her", which were left over from the session at Stax in July 1973.

The album includes a collection of songs that vary in style and genre. Released the same day as the recording of Elvis: Recorded Live on Stage in Memphis was being made, the title was taken from the song "Talk About the Good Times". Many of the songs are covers of hits at the time, like "Spanish Eyes" and "She Wears My Ring".

Charting low at the time of its release, it was considered typical 1970s Elvis material and was his first album to hit the "cut-out bins". The album did have some success though upon its original release, becoming a Cashbox Country Albums number 1 hit and charting in the Top 50 in the UK.

Original copies of the LP with the sticker on the cover (stating the singles on the album) are very rare and sell for large amounts on auction sites.

The album released two singles, both hits: "I've Got a Thing About You Baby" rose to number 4 on the Country charts, number 39 pop; "My Boy" hit number 1 on the Adult Contemporary charts, as well as number 14 Country and number 20 Pop.

== Track listing ==
=== Original release ===
Side one
No.	Title	Writer(s)	Recording date	Length
1.	"Take Good Care of Her"	Arthur Kent, Edward C. Warren	July 21, 1973	2:53
2.	"Loving Arms"	Tom Jans	December 13, 1973	2:49
3.	"I Got a Feelin' in My Body"	Dennis Linde	December 10, 1973	3:37
4.	"If That Isn't Love"	Dottie Rambo	December 16, 1973	3:31
5.	"She Wears My Ring"	Felice Bryant and Boudleaux Bryant	December 16, 1973	3:10

Side two
No.	Title	Writer(s)	Recording date	Length
1.	"I've Got a Thing About You Baby"	Tony Joe White	July 22, 1973	2:23
2.	"My Boy"	Bill Martin, Phil Coulter, Jean-Pierre Bourtayre, Claude François	December 13, 1973	3:21
3.	"Spanish Eyes"	Bert Kaempfert, Eddie Snyder, Charles Singleton	December 16, 1973	2:22
4.	"Talk About the Good Times"	Jerry Reed	December 14, 1973	2:22
5.	"Good Time Charlie's Got the Blues"	Danny O'Keefe	December 13, 1973	3:09

=== Follow That Dream re-issue ===
Disc 1
No.	Title	Length
1.	"Take Good Care Of Her"
2.	"Loving Arms"
3.	"I Got a Feelin' in My Body"
4.	"If That Isn't Love"
5.	"She Wears My Ring"
6.	"I've Got A Thing About You Baby"
7.	"My Boy"
8.	"Spanish Eyes"
9.	"Talk About The Good Times"
10.	"Good Time Charlie's Got The Blues"
11.	"Take Good Care Of Her" (rehearsal + take 1)
12.	"Loving Arms" (take 1 + rehearsal)
13.	"I Got a Feelin' in My Body" (take 1)
14.	"If That Isn't Love" (composite of take 5 & 7)
15.	"She Wears My Ring" (take 8)
16.	"I've Got A Thing About You Baby" (take 1)
17.	"My Boy" (take 1)
18.	"Spanish Eyes" (takes 1,2)
19.	"Talk About The Good Times" (take 3)
20.	"Good Time Charlie's Got The Blues" (takes 7,8)
21.	"I Got a Feelin' in My Body" (take 4)
22.	"I've Got A Thing About You Baby" (take 14)
23.	"Take Good Care Of Her" (take 4)
24.	"If That Isn't Love" (splice of takes 5 and 7)

Disc 2
No.	Title	Length
1.	"I've Got A Thing About You Baby" (take 15 [rough mix of master])
2.	"Loving Arms" (take 2)
3.	"I Got a Feelin' in My Body" (take 2)
4.	"Good Time Charlie's Got The Blues" (takes 1,4,6)
5.	"My Boy" (take 2)
6.	"Take Good Care Of Her" (takes 2,3)
7.	"If That Isn't Love" (take 4 [undubbed master])
8.	"She Wears My Ring" (takes 1, 7)
9.	"I've Got A Thing About You Baby" (take 5)
10.	"Talk About The Good Times" (takes 1,2)
11.	"Talk About The Good Times" (take 4 [undubbed master])
12.	"Loving Arms" (take 3 [undubbed master])
13.	"I Got a Feelin' in My Body" (take 3 [undubbed master])
14.	"If That Isn't Love" (take 6,7)
15.	"She Wears My Ring" (take 10 [undubbed master])
16.	"I've Got A Thing About You Baby" (takes 6,8,10,11)
17.	"Take Good Care Of Her" (take 5)
18.	"Take Good Care Of Her" (take 6 [undubbed master])
19.	"I Got a Feelin' in My Body" (take 7)
20.	"My Boy" (take 3 [undubbed master])
21.	"Spanish Eyes" (take 3)
22.	"Spanish Eyes" (take 4 [undubbed master])
23.	"Good Time Charlie's Got The Blues" (take 9 [unedited undubbed master])

== Personnel ==
- Elvis Presley – lead vocals
- James Burton – lead guitar
- Charlie Hodge – acoustic rhythm guitar
- Reggie Young – guitar
- Johnny Christopher – guitar
- Jerry Reed – lead guitar on "Talk About the Good Times"
- Dennis Linde – guitar on "Take Good Care of Her" and "I Got a Thing About You Baby"
- Bobby Wood – piano except "My Boy"
- Per Erik "Pete" Hallin – piano on "My Boy"
- Tommy Cogbill – bass guitar on "Take Good Care of Her" and "I’ve Got a Thing About You Baby"
- Norbert Putnam – bass guitar
- Bobby Emmons – Hammond organ except "My Boy"
- David Briggs – Hammond organ on "My Boy"
- Ron Tutt – drums
- Jerry Carrigan – drums on "Take Good Care of Her" and "I’ve Got a Thing About You Baby"
- Joe Esposito – percussion on "Take Good Care of Her" and "I've Got a Thing About You Baby" (uncertain)
- Mary and Ginger Holliday – backing vocals
- Kathy Westmoreland – backing vocals
- J. D. Sumner & The Stamps, Voice – backing vocals
- Mike Leech – string and horn arrangements
- Glen Spreen – string arrangement on "Take Good Care of Her" and "I've Got a Thing About You Baby"

Technical

- Al Pachucki, Dick Baxter, Mickey Crofford, Mike Moran – engineers
