= Having Fun with Elvis on Stage =

Live album by Elvis Presley
- Released: 1974
- Recorded: 1969–1974
- Genre: Spoken word
- Length: 37:06
- Label: Boxcar, RCA Victor
- Producer: Elvis Presley

Elvis Presley chronology
Elvis Recorded Live on Stage in Memphis (1974)	Having Fun with Elvis on Stage (1974)	Promised Land (1975)

Having Fun with Elvis on Stage is a 1974 spoken word concert album by American singer and musician Elvis Presley consisting entirely of dialogue and banter, mostly jokes, by Presley between songs during his live concerts; the songs themselves were removed from the recordings. Presley's manager Colonel Tom Parker conceived the album as a ploy to release a Presley recording through his own label, Boxcar Records, without using content that contractually belonged to RCA Records, so that Parker could retain 100% of the profits. Having Fun with Elvis on Stage was first sold exclusively at Presley's Las Vegas concerts during the summer of 1974; however, RCA later claimed rights to the recording and began to package and distribute it.

Having Fun with Elvis on Stage is generally considered to be Presley's worst commercially released album; many critics felt that the compilation of banter was incoherent and lacked context with the removal of the songs. In their 1991 book, Jimmy Guterman and Owen O'Donnell named Having Fun with Elvis on Stage the worst rock-and-roll album of all time, noting its lack of actual "rock and roll". Though Presley apparently had no love for the album and wanted it deleted from his catalog, it was reissued by RCA shortly after Presley's unexpected death in 1977.

== Content and release ==
The album is unique in Elvis Presley's discography as it does not contain any actual music or songs; it consists entirely of Presley talking between numbers, recorded during live concerts. Presley is frequently heard humming or singing "Well ...", which, during the actual performances, led into songs that were edited out of the recording (though occasionally a few notes can be heard played by the band in the background). Much of the album consists of Presley making jokes, although the recording is devoid of context. Despite the seeming randomness of the audio, from 8:01–11:55 on side A, Presley speaks about his early life and career aspirations before becoming a singer, as well as his early appearance on The Steve Allen Show.

The album was the idea of Colonel Tom Parker, Presley's manager. Parker wished to release a Presley album through Boxcar Records, a company that he formed to manage Presley's commercial rights, so that he could profit directly from it. However, because Presley was under contract to RCA Records, the recordings legally belonged to the label. In an attempt to circumvent this restriction, Parker compiled audio of Presley talking, rather than singing, material for which he erroneously believed RCA could not claim rights.

Initially, the album was available for sale only at Presley's Las Vegas concerts during the summer of 1974, under management's Boxcar label. Parker was soon informed that any sound recording made by Presley for commercial distribution legally belonged to RCA Records, while Presley was under contract to the label. RCA soon claimed legal rights to the recordings and the album was later reissued on the RCA Victor label, catalog number CPM1-0818, with the same cover art as the Boxcar release and message reading "A Talking Album Only" on the front cover. Presley is credited as the album's "executive producer" on the back cover. Presley reportedly disliked the album and wanted it withdrawn from his catalog, but after his unexpected death in August 1977, RCA reissued the album under revised catalog number APM1-0818.

== Reception ==
Professional ratings
Review scores
Source	Rating
AllMusic	1/5 stars
MusicHound	1/5 stars
Daily Vault	C−

Having Fun with Elvis on Stage has been described as the worst album of Elvis Presley's career. Many critics felt that the album's material was spliced in a manner lacking continuity and nearly devoid of comprehensibility or humor. Mark Deming of AllMusic states that "some have called Having Fun with Elvis on Stage thoroughly unlistenable, but actually it's worse than that; hearing it is like witnessing an auto wreck that somehow plowed into a carnival freak show, leaving onlookers at once too horrified and too baffled to turn away." Nick Greene, a writer for Mental Floss, felt that the material presented on the record is "so incoherent, you don't really get an idea of his stage presence, despite the fact that all the audio comes from his shows." Rock critics Jimmy Guterman and Owen O'Donnell, writing in their 1991 book The Worst Rock and Roll Records of All Time, named it the worst rock album ever.

The album reached number 130 on the Billboard 200 and peaked at number 9 on the Billboard Hot Country LPs chart.

RCA has never reissued the original album on compact disc, although unofficial pirated CD and vinyl editions have been available. The album was excluded from the 2016 boxed set of Presley's complete RCA albums issued during his lifetime.

== Track listing ==
1. Side A – 18:06
2. Side B – 19:00

== Personnel ==
- Elvis Presley – speeches

== Charts ==
Chart (1974)	Peak position
Billboard Top Selling LP's	130
Billboard Hot Country LPs	9

== See also ==
- List of music considered the worst
