= Loving Arms =

1973 single by Kris Kristofferson and Rita Coolidge

- German release picture sleeve

Single by Kris Kristofferson and Rita Coolidge

from the album Full Moon
- B-side: "I'm Down (But I Keep Falling)"
- Released: 1973
- Recorded: August 1973
- Genre: Country; soft rock
- Length: 3:50
- Label: A&M
- Songwriter: Tom Jans
- Producer: David Anderle

Kris Kristofferson and Rita Coolidge singles chronology
"A Song I'd Like to Sing" (1973)	"Loving Arms" (1973)	"Rain" (1974)

"Lovin' Arms"

Single by Elvis Presley

from the album Good Times
- B-side: "You Asked Me To"
- Released: March 27, 1981
- Recorded: December 13, 1973
- Genre: Country
- Label: RCA
- Songwriter: Tom Jans
- Producer: Felton Jarvis

Elvis Presley singles chronology
"Guitar Man" (1981)	"Lovin' Arms" (1981)	"There Goes My Everything" / "You'll Never Walk Alone" (1982)

"Loving Arms" is a song written by Tom Jans and first recorded as a duet by Kris Kristofferson and Rita Coolidge for their 1973 album Full Moon.

The song was notably covered by Dobie Gray that same year, then by a number of artists including Elvis Presley and Petula Clark in 1974.

== History ==
"Loving Arms" was written by Tom Jans. Jans recorded the song and released his version on his 1974 self-titled album.

Dobie Gray's version of the song peaked at number 61 on the Billboard Hot 100 for the week of October 6, 1973.

Kris Kristofferson and Rita Coolidge's version was released as a single in late 1973, and became a minor Billboard Hot 100 hit in the spring of 1974. The song first appeared on their 1973 duet album Full Moon.

Elvis Presley's version was first released on his 1974 album Good Times. In 1975, it was included as a B-side on some editions of his "My Boy" single. In 1981, it appeared on Presley's posthumous album Guitar Man and was released as the second single from it, with "You Asked Me To" on side B. In the UK, the song spent 6 weeks on the UK Singles Chart, peaking at number 47 for the week of April 14. In the United States, the single charted as a double A-side ("Lovin' Arms"/"You Asked Me To") on the Billboard Hot Country Singles chart, peaking at number 8 on the week of June 20.

Petula Clark's version reached number 12 on the US AC chart and number 9 on the Canadian AC/Pop charts on February 1, 1975. Livingston Taylor’s cover peaked at number 14 on the US AC chart in 1988.

In total, the song has been covered over 50 times. Other notable covers include ones by Olivia Newton-John, Etta James, the Dixie Chicks,, Demis Roussos and Paul Heaton & Jacqui Abbott.

== Personnel ==
- Kris Kristofferson and Rita Coolidge – vocals
- Sammy Creason – drums
- Leland Sklar – bass
- Jerry McGee – guitar, harmonica
- Bobbye Hall – percussion
- Randy Scruggs – guitar
- Booker T. Jones – keyboards

== Personnel on Dobie Gray's version ==
- Dobie Gray, vocals
- David Briggs, keyboards
- Mike Leech, bass
- Kenny Malone, drums
- Troy Seals, acoustic and electric guitar
- Reggie Young, acoustic and electric guitar, banjo
- Weldon Myrick, pedal steel guitar
- Buddy Spicher, violin
- Charlie McCoy, harmonica

== Musical style and lyrics ==
As Steven Blanton notes in his book The Songwriter's Toolkit: From Pen to Push Play, "[t]he song is written using the method of holding the title until the last line effectively."

== Charts ==
=== Dobie Gray version ===
Chart (1973)	Peak position
US Billboard Hot 100	61
Canada (RPM)	67

=== Kris Kristofferson and Rita Coolidge version ===
Chart (1974)	Peak position
US Billboard Hot 100	86
Canada (RPM)	83
Canada AC (RPM)	9

=== Elvis Presley version ===
Chart (1981)	Peak position
UK Singles (Official Charts Company)	47
US Billboard Hot Country Singles	8*

* as "Lovin' Arms"/"You Asked Me To"
