= Raised on Rock / For Ol' Times Sake =

Raised on Rock/For Ol' Times Sake

Studio album by Elvis Presley
- Released: October 1, 1973
- Recorded: July 21–24, 1973, Stax Studios, Memphis; September 22–23, 1973, Elvis Presley's Residence, Palm Springs, California
- Genres: Rock; R&B; funk; country
- Length: 27:28
- Label: RCA Victor
- Producers: Elvis Presley; Felton Jarvis

Elvis Presley chronology
Elvis (1973)	Raised on Rock/For Ol' Times Sake (1973)	Elvis: A Legendary Performer Volume 1 (1974)

Singles from Raised on Rock/For Ol' Times Sake
- 1. "Raised on Rock" Released: August 20, 1973

Raised on Rock/For Ol' Times Sake is the nineteenth studio album by American singer and musician Elvis Presley, released in 1973.

== Content ==
The album was recorded at Stax Studios in Memphis, Tennessee in July 1973 and at Presley's home in Palm Springs, California in September 1973. Two songs from these sessions would be retained for release on the Good Times album the following spring. The initial vocal tracks were recorded in July 1973. "Raised on Rock" backed by "For Ol' Times Sake" was the only single released from the album, reaching No. 41 on the Billboard chart and No. 42 on the Country chart in September 1973.

The album was one of the few that failed to chart in the United Kingdom, but the single "Raised on Rock / For Ol' Times Sake" did enter the British charts. Some of the songs are well-known covers like "Are You Sincere" which had been around for many years, but some new songs like the lead-off single were written for Presley, or written by writers he had previously recorded, such as Mark James. The title single, "Raised on Rock", has been noted by historians such as Roy Carr and Mick Farren in Elvis: The Illustrated Record as odd lyrically, as Presley sings in first person about being a child and discovering rock and roll through records such as "Johnny B. Goode" when Presley was a contemporary of the artists he cites.

In 1979, a stripped-down version of "Are You Sincere" was included on the album Our Memories of Elvis and released as a single, reaching No. 10 on the Billboard Country chart.

== Reissues ==
In 2007, Raised on Rock was reissued on the Follow That Dream label in a special 2-disc edition that contained the original album tracks along with numerous alternate takes.

== Track listing ==
=== Original release ===
Side one
No.	Title	Writer(s)	Recording date	Length
1.	"Raised on Rock"	Mark James	July 23, 1973	2:40
2.	"Are You Sincere?"	Wayne Walker	September 23, 1973	2:01
3.	"Find Out What's Happening"	Jerry Crutchfield	July 23, 1973	2:31
4.	"I Miss You"	Donnie Sumner	September 23, 1973	2:14
5.	"Girl of Mine"	Les Reed, Barry Mason	July 24, 1973	3:38

Side two
No.	Title	Writer(s)	Recording date	Length
1.	"For Ol' Times Sake"	Tony Joe White	July 23, 1973	3:37
2.	"If You Don't Come Back"	Jerry Leiber, Mike Stoller	July 21, 1973	2:31
3.	"Just a Little Bit"	Ralph Bass, Ferdinand Washington, Piney Brown, John Thornton	July 21, 1973	2:33
4.	"Sweet Angeline"	Chris Arnold, David Martin, Geoff Morrow	July 25, 1973	3:02
5.	"Three Corn Patches"	Jerry Leiber, Mike Stoller	July 21, 1973	2:46

=== 2007 Follow That Dream reissue ===
Original album
No.	Title	Length
1.	"Raised On Rock"
2.	"Are You Sincere"
3.	"Find Out What’s Happening"
4.	"I Miss You"
5.	"Girl of Mine"
6.	"For Ol' Times Sake"
7.	"If You Don’t Come Back"
8.	"Just a Little Bit"
9.	"Sweet Angeline"
10.	"Three Corn Patches"

Session highlights
No.	Title	Length
11.	"I Miss You" (take 10-11)
12.	"Find out What’s happening" (take 6)
13.	"It’s Different Now" (rehearsal, unedited)
14.	"Three Corn Patches" (take 1-2)
15.	"If You Don’t Come Back" (take 5)
16.	"Girl of Mine" (take 9)
17.	"I Miss You" (take 5)
18.	"Three Corn Patches" (take 13-14)
19.	"Are You Sincere" (take 2)
20.	"Find Out What’s Happening" (take 8, 7)
21.	"For Ol' Times Sake" (take 4)

Instrumental tracks
No.	Title	Length
22.	"Color My Rainbow"
23.	"Sweet Angeline"

Rough mixes
No.	Title	Length
1.	"For Ol' Times Sake"
2.	"If You Don’t Come Back"
3.	"Find Out What’s Happening"
4.	"Raised On Rock"
5.	"Three Corn Patches" (including false start)

Session outtakes
No.	Title	Length
6.	"If You Don’t Come Back" (take 1–3)
7.	"I Miss You" (take 1)
8.	"Girl of Mine" (take 1)
9.	"Find Out What’s Happening" (takes 1, 2, 4, 5)
10.	"Three Corn Patches" (take 4–6)
11.	"For Ol' Times Sake" (take 5–7)
12.	"I Miss You" (take 10)
13.	"If You Don’t Come Back" (takes 8, 6)
14.	"Find Our What’s Happening" (takes 8, 7)
15.	"Are You Sincere" (take 1)
16.	"Girl of Mine" (take 3–6)
17.	"Three Corn Patches" (take 9–10)
18.	"I Miss You" (take 12–15)

Instrumental tracks
No.	Title	Length
19.	"The Wonders You Perform"
20.	"Good, Bad But Beautiful"

== Personnel ==
- Elvis Presley – lead vocals
- Mary and Ginger Holliday – backing vocals
- Kathy Westmoreland – backing vocals
- J. D. Sumner and the Stamps – backing vocals
- James Burton – lead guitar
- Bobby Manuel – lead guitar on "Girl of Mine" and "Sweet Angeline"
- Charlie Hodge – acoustic rhythm guitar
- Reggie Young – guitar on "If You Don't Come Back", "Find Out What's Happening", "Just a Little Bit" and "Three Corn Patches"
- Johnny Christopher – guitar on "Raised on Rock", "For Ol’ Times Sake", "Girl of Mine" and "Sweet Angeline"
- Dennis Linde – guitar on "Girl of Mine"
- Tommy Cogbill – bass guitar (except "Are You Sincere", "I Miss You", "Girl of Mine", and "Sweet Angeline")
- Donald "Duck" Dunn – bass guitar on "Girl of Mine" and "Sweet Angeline"
- Tom Hensley – bass guitar on "Are You Sincere" and "I Miss You"
- Bobby Wood – piano except "Are You Sincere" and "I Miss You"
- Donnie Sumner – piano on "Are You Sincere" and "I Miss You"
- Bobby Emmons – Hammond organ except “Are You Sincere” and “I Miss You”
- Ron Tutt – drums (except "Are You Sincere", "I Miss You", "Girl of Mine" and "Sweet Angeline")
- Jerry Carrigan – drums except "Are You Sincere" and "I Miss You"
- Al Jackson Jr. – drums on "Girl of Mine"
- Glen Spreen – string arrangements
