= I've Got a Thing About You Baby =

1972 song by Tony Joe White

Single by Tony Joe White

from the album The Train I'm On
- B-side: "The Gospel Singer"
- Released: 1972
- Recorded: 1972
- Genre: Blues rock
- Length: 2:39
- Label: Warner Bros.
- Songwriter: Tony Joe White

Tony Joe White singles chronology
"Even Trolls Love Rock And Roll" (1972)	"I've Got a Thing About You Baby" / "The Gospel Singer" (1972)	"Backwoods Preacher Man" (1973)

"I've Got a Thing About You Baby" is a song by Tony Joe White, released in 1972 as a single from his album The Train I'm On. It was notably covered by Elvis Presley.

== Track listing ==
7" single (Warner Bros. WB 7607, 1972)
No.	Title	Writer(s)	Length
1.	"I've Got a Thing About You Baby"	Tony Joe White	2:39
2.	"The Gospel Singer"	Tony Joe White	3:26

== Elvis Presley version ==
"I've Got a Thing About You, Baby"

Single by Elvis Presley

from the album Good Times
- A-side: "Take Good Care of Her"
- Released: January 11, 1974
- Recorded: July 22, 1973
- Studio: Stax Studios, Memphis, Tennessee
- Length: 2:20
- Label: RCA Victor
- Songwriter: Tony Joe White

Elvis Presley singles chronology
"Raised on Rock" / "For Ol' Times Sake" (1973)	"Take Good Care of Her" / "I've Got a Thing About You, Baby" (1974)	"If You Talk in Your Sleep" / "Help Me" (1974)

Elvis Presley covered this song in 1974 and released it B-side to the single of "Take Good Care of Her" and later was released It album Good Times

His version reached number 33 in the UK.

In 2016, the Elvis's version was posthumously remixed version featuring the instrumental orchestra of Royal Philharmonic Orchestra and was released on the album The Wonder Of You.

=== Track listing ===
7" single (RCA Victor APB0-0196, 1974)
No.	Title	Writer(s)	Length
1.	"Take Good Care of Her"	Arthur Kent, Ed Warren	2:52
2.	"I've Got a Thing About You Baby"	Tony Joe White	2:20

=== Charts ===
Chart (1974)	Peak position
UK Singles (OCC)	33
"I've Got a Thing About You, Baby" / "Take Good Care of Her"
US Billboard Hot 100	39
US Hot Country Songs (Billboard)	4
"Take Good Care of Her" / "I've Got a Thing About You, Baby"
US Adult Contemporary (Billboard)	27

Elvis with The Royal Philharmonic Orchestra version

Chart (2016)	Peak position
Belgium (Ultratip Bubbling Under Flanders)	–
