= For Ol' Times Sake =

Single by Elvis Presley

from the album Raised on Rock / For Ol' Times Sake
- A-side: "Raised on Rock"
- Released: 1973
- Recorded: July 23, 1973
- Genre: Country
- Length: 3:32
- Songwriter(s): Tony Joe White (words and music)

Elvis Presley singles chronology
"Fool" / "Steamroller Blues" (1973)	"Raised on Rock" / "For Ol' Times Sake" (1973)	"Take Good Care of Her" / "I've Got a Thing About You, Baby" (1974)

"For Ol' Times Sake'" is a song by Tony Joe White, covered in 1973 by Elvis Presley.

It was written by Tony Joe White, who originally released it on his 1973 album Homemade Ice Cream. His other songs covered by Presley are "Polk Salad Annie" and "I've Got a Thing About You Baby".

Elvis recorded it at Stax Recording Studios in Memphis, Tennessee. on July 23, 1973.

Elvis Presley's version was first released in 1973 as a single with "Raised on Rock" on the other side. Both songs were then included on the album Raised on Rock / For Ol' Times Sake.

The single "Raised on Rock" / "For Ol' Times Sake" (listed by Billboard as a double-A-sided hit) reached number 41 on the Billboard Hot 100 on the week of October 27, 1973.

In addition, the song "For Ol' Times Sake" reached number 42 on the Billboard Hot Country Singles on the week of November 24.

== Charts ==
Chart (1973)	Peak position
"For Ol' Times Sake"
US Billboard Hot Country Songs	42
"Raised on Rock / For Ol' Times Sake"
US Billboard Hot 100	41
