= Raised on Rock (Elvis Presley song) =

Single by Elvis Presley

from the album Raised on Rock / For Ol' Times Sake
- B-side: "For Ol' Times Sake"
- Released: August 20, 1973
- Recorded: July 23, 1973
- Studio: Stax Studios, Memphis
- Genre: Country rock
- Songwriter: Mark James

Elvis Presley singles chronology
"Fool" / "Steamroller Blues" (1973)	"Raised on Rock" / "For Ol' Times Sake" (1973)	"Take Good Care of Her" / "I've Got a Thing About You, Baby" (1974)

"Raised on Rock'" is a 1973 song by Elvis Presley. It was written for him by Mark James, the author of Elvis' 1969 number 1 hit "Suspicious Minds".

The song was first released in 1973 as a single, with "For Ol' Times Sake" on the B-side, and then included on the album Raised on Rock / For Ol' Times Sake.

== Musical style and lyrics ==
The song is sung from the point of view of a person who, as a child in the early years of rock'n'roll, was raised on songs like "Hound Dog" and "Johnny B. Goode" he would listen to on the radio every day.

Roy Carr and Mick Farren commented in Elvis: The Illustrated Record that the song was lyrically mismatched for Elvis, as he was a contemporary of the artists mentioned.

== Charts ==
The single "Raised on Rock" / "For Ol' Times Sake" (listed by Billboard as a double-A-sided hit) reached number 41 on the Billboard Hot 100 for the week of October 27, 1973. In addition, the song "Raised on Rock" reached number 27 on the Billboard Easy Listening chart for the week of November 3, 1973.

In the UK Singles Chart, the single "Raised on Rock" reached number 36 for the week of November 24, 1973.

Chart (1973)	Peak position
UK Singles Chart (Official Charts Company)	36
US Billboard Easy Listening	27
US Billboard Hot 100	41*

^{*} Listed as "Raised on Rock / For Ol' Times Sake".
