= I Got a Feelin' in My Body =

Single by Elvis Presley

from the album Good Times
- B-side: "There's a Honky Tonk Angel (Who'll Take Me Back In)"
- Released: July 1979
- Recorded: December 10, 1973
- Studio: Stax Studios, Memphis
- Genre: Funk, gospel, rock
- Length: 3:33
- Label: RCA
- Songwriter: Dennis Linde
- Producer: Felton Jarvis

Elvis Presley singles chronology
"Are You Sincere" (1979)	"I Got a Feelin' in My Body" (1979)	"Guitar Man" (1981)

"I Got a Feelin' in My Body" is a song by Elvis Presley from his 1974 album Good Times.

In 1979, it was released posthumously on the reverse side of the single "There's a Honky Tonk Angel (Who Will Take Me Back In)". The single reached number 6 in the Billboard Country Singles Chart.

== Writing and recording ==
The song was written by Dennis Linde.

Presley recorded it on December 10 during the December 10–16, 1973 studio sessions for RCA at the Stax Studios in Memphis, Tennessee.

Its first release on record was on the album Good Times in 1974.

== Track listing ==
7" single

1. "I Got a Feelin' in My Body" (3:33)
2. "There's a Honky Tonk Angel (Who Will Take Me Back In)" (3:02)

== Charts ==
"There's a Honky Tonk Angel" / "I Got a Feelin' in My Body"
Chart (1979)	Peak position
U.S. Billboard Country Singles Chart	6
U.S. Cash Box Magazine Top Country & Western Singles	5
