= Fool (Elvis Presley song) =

- Picture sleeve for the U.S. vinyl single, with "Steamroller Blues" on its flipside cover

Single by Elvis Presley

from the album Elvis (The "Fool" Album)
- A-side: "Steamroller Blues"
- Released: 1973
- Recorded: March 28, 1972
- Genre: Country rock
- Songwriters: Carl Sigman; James Last

Elvis Presley singles chronology
"Separate Ways" / "Always on My Mind" (1972)	"Fool" / "Steamroller Blues" (1973)	"Raised on Rock" / "For Ol' Times Sake" (1973)

Professional ratings
Review scores
Source	Rating
Billboard	Favorable

"Fool" is a 1973 song by Elvis Presley. It was adapted by songwriter Carl Sigman from a composition by James Last, titled "No Words". It was released as a single with the flipside track "Steamroller Blues" and then on the 1973 album Elvis (as its opening track).

On Billboard Hot 100 the single charted as "Steamroller Blues / Fool", peaking at number 17 on the week of June 2, 1973. "Fool" also charted on the Billboard Easy Listening chart, spending there 16 weeks in total and peaking at number 12 on the same week of June 2.

In the United Kingdom the single "Fool" spent 10 weeks on the UK Singles Chart, peaking at number 15 on the week of August 11, 1973.

== Critical response ==
Billboard reviewed the single in its April 7, 1973, issue, calling it a "[s]trong ballad effort in country-rock vein, following along lines of [Presley's] other ballad hits." The magazine also noted the "good [chart] potential" of the flip side ("Steamroller Blues" by James Taylor).

== Charts ==
Chart (1973)	Peak position
UK Singles Chart (Official Charts Company)	15
US Billboard Hot 100	17*
US Billboard Easy Listening	12

^{*} as "Steamroller Blues / Fool"
