= Take Good Care of Her =

1961 song

Single by Adam Wade

from the album Adam Wade's Greatest Hits
- B-side: "Sleepy Time Girl" (original); "Too Far" (re-release)
- Released: 1961
- Recorded: 1960
- Genre: Pop
- Length: 2:29
- Label: Coed
- Songwriters: Arthur Kent; Ed Warren
- Producer: George Paxton

Adam Wade singles chronology
"Gloria's Theme" (1960)	"Take Good Care of Her" (1961)	"The Writing on the Wall" (1961)

"Take Good Care of Her"

Single by Sonny James

from the album True Love's a Blessing
- B-side: "On the Fingers of One Hand"
- Released: March 1966
- Genre: Country
- Length: 2:29
- Label: Capitol
- Songwriters: Arthur Kent; Ed Warren
- Producer: Marvin Hughes

Sonny James singles chronology
"True Love's a Blessing" (1965)	"Take Good Care of Her" (1966)	"Room in Your Heart" (1966)

"Take Good Care of Her"

Single by Elvis Presley

from the album Good Times
- B-side: "I've Got a Thing About You, Baby"
- Released: January 11, 1974
- Recorded: July 21, 1973
- Studio: Stax Studios, Memphis
- Genre: Country
- Length: 2:52
- Songwriters: Ed Warren and Arthur Kent

Elvis Presley singles chronology
"Raised on Rock" / "For Ol' Times Sake" (1973)	"Take Good Care of Her" / "I've Got a Thing About You, Baby" (1974)	"If You Talk in Your Sleep" / "Help Me" (1974)

"Take Good Care of Her" is a 1961 song written by Arthur Kent and Ed Warren and recorded by Adam Wade. It reached number twenty on the R&B charts and number seven on the Hot 100. In the song, the narrator speaks to the groom of his ex-girlfriend.

== Cover versions ==
- In 1962, Johnny Tillotson covered the song on his album It Keeps Right On a-Hurtin'.
- In 1963, Dean Martin covered the song on his album Dean "Tex" Martin Rides Again.
- In 1966, Sonny James had a number one country hit with his version of the song. It was the fourth among his 24 No. 1 singles.
- Later that year, Mel Carter recorded the song and reached No. 78 on US pop charts.
- In 1973, Elvis Presley recorded a version of the song. The B-Side was "I've Got a Thing About You Baby".
- In the same year, Johnny Mathis (in whom Wade had an exact vocal style early in his career) reached No. 40 on Adult Contemporary charts.

== Chart performance ==
=== Adam Wade ===
Chart (1961)	Peak position
US Billboard Hot 100	7
US Billboard Hot R&B Singles	20
UK Singles Chart	38

=== Sonny James ===
Chart (1966)	Peak position
US Billboard Hot Country Singles	1

=== Johnny Mathis ===
Chart (1973)	Peak position
US Billboard Easy Listening	40
Canada RPM Adult Contemporary	15

=== Elvis Presley ===
Chart (1973)	Peak position
US Billboard Hot 100	39
US Billboard Easy Listening	27
US Billboard Hot Country Singles	4
Canada RPM Top Tracks	56
Canada RPM Adult Contemporary	7

=== Bobbie Evans ===
Chart (1980)	Peak position
Canada RPM Country Singles	42
