= Tom Jans =

American singer-songwriter

- Born: February 9, 1948; Yakima, Washington
- Died: March 25, 1984 (aged 36) Los Angeles, California
- Genres: Folk, pop
- Occupations: Singer-songwriter, musician
- Instruments: Vocals, guitar, piano
- Years active: 1971–1982
- Formerly of: Mimi Fariña
- Website: tomjans.com

Tom Jans (February 9, 1948 – March 25, 1984) was an American folk singer-songwriter and guitarist from San Jose, California. He is perhaps best known for his song "Loving Arms" (also known as "Lovin' Arms"), which was recorded initially by Kris Kristofferson and Rita Coolidge, and notably covered by Dobie Gray, Elvis Presley, Jon English and Petula Clark.

== Early life ==
The son of a farmer, Tom Jans was raised near San Jose. Jans's paternal grandmother had been involved in music, playing in the Rocky Mountain Five jazz group. His influences ranged from Hank Williams to flamenco (his mother was from Spain) to the Beatles. He studied English literature at the University of California, Davis, but rejected a graduate scholarship to Columbia University to seek a career in music.

== Career ==
Playing coffeehouses in San Francisco, Jans met Joan Baez, who introduced him to her sister Mimi Fariña in 1970. Fariña had achieved cult status as part of a duo with her late husband Richard Fariña. Fariña had begun writing new songs and was looking for a partner to perform them with; Jans seemed to be a similar collaborator and the two formed a new duo. The duo played San Francisco Bay Area clubs and received notice from their performance at the Big Sur Folk Festival. The group then toured extensively as a supporting act for Cat Stevens and then James Taylor. They received a recording contract from A&M Records, releasing the album Take Heart in 1971. However, the album received little notice and the duo split up in 1972.

Jans moved to Nashville to pursue work as a songwriter, working for the publishing house Irving/Almo. His first hit as a writer was the song "Loving Arms", initially recorded by Kris Kristofferson and Rita Coolidge and then by Dobie Gray and Elvis Presley in 1973. Jans put the song on his self-titled solo debut album on A&M Records in 1974. The album was produced by Mentor Williams and featured guitarists Lonnie Mack and Troy Seals. However, the record was a commercial failure and Jans opted to relocate to Los Angeles.

After a period of isolation, Jans released a second album, The Eyes of an Only Child, on Columbia Records in 1975, executive produced by Lowell George. The album featured his song "Out of Hand", which later became a country hit for Gary Stewart. The song "Struggle in Darkness" was also a minor hit on FM radio, but the album was not a commercial success. His next album on Columbia Records, Dark Blonde (1976), also did not generate high sales, and Jans moved to Europe.

When the Columbia releases failed to find an audience, his career lost momentum and although Jans continued to perform, he issued no recordings until 1982's Champion, a Don Grusin-produced album that was released in Japan only.

== Death and legacy ==
Jans suffered serious injuries, especially to his kidneys, in a motorcycle accident in 1983. He died at age 36 of a suspected drug overdose in 1984. Mentor Williams's brother Paul sang "Loving Arms" at Jans's funeral.

Tom Waits dedicated a song to Jans, whom he and his wife had befriended, "Whistle Down the Wind (For Tom Jans)" from Bone Machine. Waits said of the song, "It was written about another friend, but it was the kind of song that Tom Jans would have written. He was there in spirit".
