= Per-Erik Hallin =

Swedish musician (born 1950)

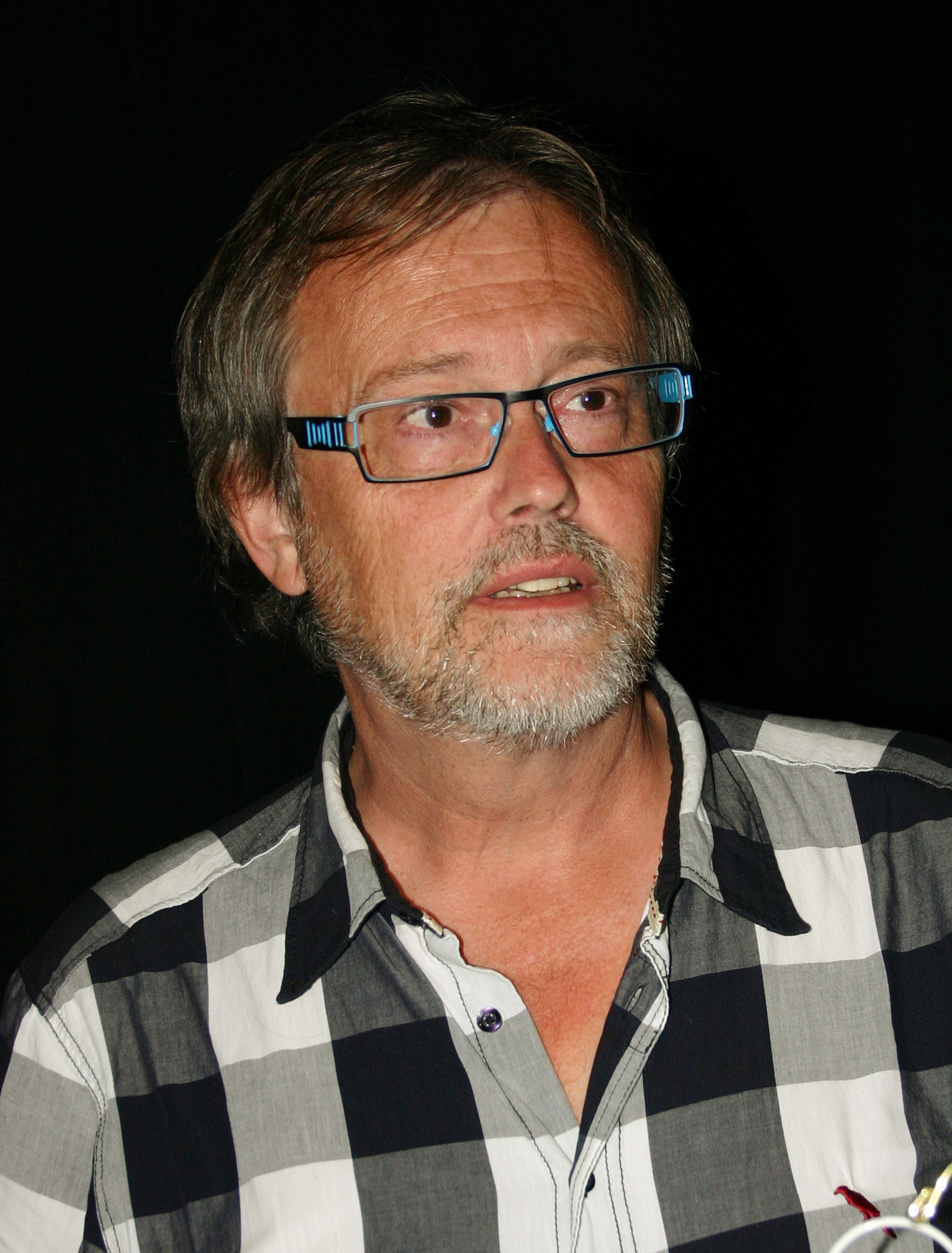
- Per Erik Hallin in 2008

Per Erik Hallin (born 7 January 1950) is a Swedish keyboard player, singer and songwriter. He has worked as a musician in many different contexts and in different parts of the world. His music is heavily influenced by the African American music tradition such as soul, jazz, blues and gospel.

Hallin played and sang with Elvis Presley in 1974. Hallin took part in the Swedish Melodifestivalen in 1984 and 1985. He has sung and played with musicians and artists including: Carola Häggkvist, Ted Gärdestad, Alex Acuña, Bill Maxwell, Per Lindvall, Hadley Hockensmith, Ingemar Olsson, Frank Ådahl and Nathan East.

He has also provided the Swedish voice for Donald Duck (Swedish: Kalle Anka) in dubbings into Swedish.

== Awards ==
In 2006, he won the Artur Erikson-stipend.

== Discography ==
Hallin has worked on numerous productions. This is not a complete list.

=== Own releases ===
==== Album ====
- 1982 Better Late Than Never (LP)
- 1985 Morgonluft (LP)
- 1987 Per Erik (MC)
- 1987 Live i Rättviks kyrka (LP) with Carola Häggkvist
- 2002 Älskade barnpsalmer (LP)

==== Singles ====
- 1971 I Found the Lord (with Agneta Gilstig)
- 1977 Don't Throw It All Away (released under the name Pete & Angie Hallin)
- 1981 Vilken värld det ska bli / Myrorna
- 1982 Better Late Than Never / Att Vänta
- 1984 Labyrint / You put another song in my heart
- 1985 Morgonluft / Gospel Train
- 1987 Vilken Värld Det Ska Bli/Gospeltrain (with Carola)
- 1987 You've Got A Friend/Step By Step (with Carola)
- 1990 Tänd en eld (with Ann Alinder)
- 2005 I de Levandes Land

=== Featured artist ===
- 1973 Ingmar Olsson, I Alla Fall
- 1974 Elvis Presley, Elvis Recorded Live on Stage in Memphis, Recorded 20 March, (Hallin member of the choir Voice)
- 1974 Elvis Presley, Good Times
- 1974 Harpo, Moviestar
- 1975 Elvis Presley, Promised Land (Hallin played piano on numerous tracks)
- 1975 Ola Magnell, Nya Perspektiv
- 1975 Gin & Grappo, s/t
- 1975 Ingemar Olsson, Well And Alive
- 1976 Magnus Uggla, Livets Teater
- 1976 Bernt Staf, Vår Om Du Vill
- 1976 Harpo, Harpo Smile
- 1976 Svenne & Lotta, Letters
- 1976 Ted Gärdestad, Franska Kort
- 1976 Ingemar Olsson, Genomskådad
- 1976 Ulf Lundell, Törst
- 1976 John Holm, Veckans Affärer
- 1978 Jamie Owens-Collins, Love Eyes
- 1978 Ingemar Olsson, En Liten Bit i Taget
- 1978 Harpo, Jan Banan (och hans flygande matta)
- 1979 Harpo, Råck änd råll rätt å slätt
- 1979 Mikael Rickfors, Kickin a dream
- 1979 Göran Rydh, s/t
- 1979 Ola Magnell, Straggel och Strul
- 1979 Therese Juel, Levande
- 1980 Ted Gärdestad, I'd Rather Write A Symphony
- 1980 Ingemar Olsson, Journey
- 1981 Ted Gärdestad, Stormvarning
- 1981 Ingemar Olsson, Musikalen Pappa
- 1982 Live in Scandinavium
- 1983 Ingemar Olsson, I Full Frihet
- 1983 GA-Gospel, Original
- 1984 Harpo, Lets Get Romantic
- 1984 Allsångskonsert med Kjell Lönnå och gästsolister
- 1985 Duane Loken, Little Storm
- 1986 We Love Gospel Music
- 1989 Front Row
- 1990 We Love Gospel Music II
- 1990 Awakening – New Directions in Christian Music
- 1991 Julens Musik
- 1994 Royal Years 2
- 2004 Carola, Credo
- Jul i Ankeborg
