= Arthur Kent (songwriter) =

American composer of popular songs (1920–2009)

- Born: July 2, 1920; New York City, New York, U.S.
- Died: January 26, 2009 (aged 88); Florence, South Carolina

Arthur Kent (July 2, 1920, New York City – January 26, 2009, Florence, South Carolina) was an American composer of popular songs, many of which he wrote in collaboration with lyricist Sylvia Dee.

== Selected songs ==
- "So They Tell Me" with lyricists Harold Mott and Jack Gale, sung by Frank Sinatra 1946
- "You Never Miss the Water (Till the Well Runs Dry)," lyricist Paul Secon for the Mills Brothers
- "Don't Go to Strangers", with Redd Evans and David Mann recorded in 1960 by Etta Jones
- "Take Good Care of Her", with lyricist Ed Warren, a Top Ten hit for Adam Wade
- "I'm Coming Back to You", with Warren, sung by Julie London 1963
- "The End of the World", with lyricist Sylvia Dee, sung by Skeeter Davis 1963
- "Bring Me Sunshine", with Dee for Willie Nelson, and in the UK the theme tune for comedians Morecambe and Wise
- "I Taught Her Everything She Knows", with Dee, sung by Billy Walker
- "Just Across the Mountain", with Johnny Mercer for Eddy Arnold 1968
- "Little Acorns", with Mercer, sung by Hank Locklin 1970
- "Wonder When My Baby's Comin' Home," with lyricist Kermit Goell, sung by Barbara Mandrell
