= You Ask Me To =

Single by Waylon Jennings

from the album Honky Tonk Heroes
- B-side: "Willy the Wandering Gypsy and Me"
- Released: October 6, 1973
- Genre: Country
- Label: RCA Victor
- Songwriters: Waylon Jennings, Billy Joe Shaver
- Producer: Waylon Jennings

Waylon Jennings singles chronology
"We Had It All" (1973)	"You Ask Me To" (1973)	"This Time" (1974)

"You Ask Me To" is a song written by Billy Joe Shaver and Waylon Jennings. It was originally recorded by Jennings on his 1973 album Honky Tonk Heroes. This record spent fifteen weeks on the Billboard country singles charts, reaching a peak of number eight. Shaver recorded his own version in 1977 titled "You Asked Me To" in the past tense for the album Gypsy Boy, with special guest Willie Nelson on guitar and vocals. "You Ask Me To" also appeared as the closing song on Elvis Presley's 1975 album Promised Land. It was recorded in December 1973 at Stax Records studios in Memphis and released on Presley's 40th birthday. It also appeared with an alternate arrangement in Elvis Presley's posthumous 1981 album Guitar Man, which reached the Top 50 in the US.

== Chart performance ==
=== Waylon Jennings version ===
Chart (1973)	Peak position
US Hot Country Songs (Billboard)	8
Canadian RPM Country Tracks	8

=== Billy Joe Shaver version ===
Chart (1978)	Peak position
US Hot Country Songs (Billboard)	80
