= Steamroller Blues =

1970 song by James Taylor

Single by James Taylor

from the album Sweet Baby James
- Released: 1970
- Recorded: December 1969
- Studio: Sunset Sound
- Genre: Blues
- Length: 2:57
- Label: Warner Bros.
- Songwriter: James Taylor
- Producer: Peter Asher

James Taylor singles chronology
"Country Road" (1970)	"Steamroller Blues" (1970)	"Sunny Skies" (1971)

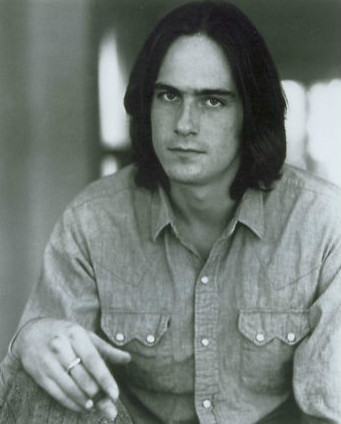
James Taylor in a 1970s publicity photo

"Steamroller Blues"

Single by Elvis Presley

from the album Aloha from Hawaii via Satellite
- B-side: "Fool"
- Released: March 4, 1973
- Recorded: January 14, 1973
- Venue: H.I.C. Arena, Honolulu
- Genre: Blues
- Label: RCA Victor
- Songwriter: James Taylor

Elvis Presley singles chronology
"Separate Ways" / "Always on My Mind" (1972)	"Steamroller Blues" (1973)	"Raised on Rock" (1973)

"Steamroller Blues" (a.k.a. "Steamroller"), is a blues parody written by James Taylor, that appeared on his 1970 album Sweet Baby James. It was intended to mock the inauthentic blues bands of the day. The song later appeared on two of Taylor's compilation albums and has been recorded by a variety of other artists.

== Origin and recording ==
Rock journalist David Browne wrote that "[d]uring the Flying Machine days in the Village, Taylor had heard one too many pretentious white blues bands and wrote 'Steamroller' to mock them." Rolling Stone Album Guide critic Mark Coleman, said Taylor's song "effectively mocks the straining pomposity of then-current white bluesmen".

Taylor and Danny Kortchmar, both playing electric guitars, laid down the track in one night at Sunset Studios, the rhythm section being added later. A tight budget and production schedule forced Taylor to record the song despite suffering from a head cold.

The song was included on Taylor's diamond-selling Greatest Hits 1976 compilation using a live version recorded in August 1975 at the Universal Amphitheatre in Los Angeles. Another performance, from 1992, was included on his 1993 album (LIVE). The profanity in the earlier release was missing from the latter.

== Personnel ==
- James Taylor – lead vocals, acoustic guitar
- Danny Kortchmar – electric guitar
- Clarence McDonald – piano
- Leland Sklar – bass
- Russ Kunkel – drums

== Cover versions ==
- During the 1970s, Elvis Presley added "Steamroller Blues" to his concert repertoire and included it on his live album Aloha from Hawaii: Via Satellite. Presley also released it as a single in March 1973 with "Fool" as its flipside track, and the song reached number 17 on the Billboard U.S. pop singles chart, number 10 on the Cash Box top pop singles chart and number 16 on the Record World singles chart. It was later included on Presley's 2007 compilation The Essential Elvis Presley. A newly orchestrated version was included on the 2015 album If I Can Dream with the Royal Philharmonic Orchestra. This song resulted in Presley's last 3 entries at number 1 on a major charting format. The "Aloha From Hawaii" double LP peaked at number 1 on the Billboard and Cash Box Albums Charts. The single, "Steamroller Blues", taken from the Aloha From Hawaii LP, peaked at number 1 on Record World Single Chart. In addition, the Aloha LP produced Presley's final number 1 across the 4 major US charting categories (Billboard, Billboard Country, Cash Box, Cash Box Country). Record World called it "a lively interpretation of the James Taylor tune [that] should roll up sales quickly and say 'aloha' to the charts."
- Merry Clayton included a version of the song on her 1971 eponymous album, titling it simply "Steamroller".
- Taylor's song was recorded by country music singer Billy Dean and appeared on his 1993 album Fire in the Dark.

== Popular culture ==
- Isaac Hayes performed the song on an episode of The A-Team.
