= Peace in the Valley: The Complete Gospel Recordings =

Compilation album by Elvis Presley
- Released: September 12, 2000
- Recorded: 1956–1977
- Genre: Gospel
- Length: 3:39:27
- Label: RCA Records
- Producer: Ernst Jorgensen, Roger Semon

Elvis Presley chronology
He Touched Me: The Gospel Music of Elvis Presley (2000)	Peace in the Valley: The Complete Gospel Recordings (2000)	Live in Las Vegas (2001)

Professional ratings
Review scores
Source	Rating
AllMusic	3/5 stars

Peace in The Valley: The Complete Gospel Recordings is a triple-CD compilation album by Elvis Presley, released in 2000.

In January 2001 the album debuted at number 13 on Billboard's Top Contemporary Christian album chart. At the time it was Presley's highest ever entry on the chart.

On March 8, 2018, the album was awarded a Gold certification by the RIAA for selling in excess of 500,000 units.

== Track listing ==
=== Disc 1 ===
No.	Title	Writer(s)	Original release	Length
1.	"His Hand in Mine"	Mosie Lister	His Hand in Mine	3:19
2.	"I'm Gonna Walk Dem Golden Stairs"	Culley Holt	His Hand in Mine	1:52
3.	"In My Father's House"	Aileene Hanks	His Hand in Mine	2:06
4.	"Milky White Way"	Traditional; arr. by Elvis Presley	His Hand in Mine	2:15
5.	"Known Only to Him"	Stuart Hamblen	His Hand in Mine	2:08
6.	"I Believe in the Man in the Sky"	Richard Howard	His Hand in Mine	2:12
7.	"Joshua Fit the Battle"	Traditional; arr. by Elvis Presley	His Hand in Mine	2:41
8.	"He Knows Just What I Need"	Mosie Lister	His Hand in Mine	2:13
9.	"Swing Down Sweet Chariot"	Traditional; arr. by Elvis Presley	His Hand in Mine	2:34
10.	"Mansion over the Hilltop"	Ira Stanphill	His Hand in Mine	2:57
11.	"If We Never Meet Again"	Albert E. Brumley	His Hand in Mine	1:59
12.	"Working on the Building"	Winifred O. Hoyle and Lillian Bowles	His Hand in Mine	1:52
13.	"Crying in the Chapel"	Artie Glenn	How Great Thou Art	2:23
14.	"How Great Thou Art"	Stuart K. Hine (original by Carl Boberg)	How Great Thou Art	3:00
15.	"In the Garden"	C. Austin Miles	How Great Thou Art	3:09
16.	"Somebody Bigger than You or I"	Sonny Burke, Hy Heath, Johnny Lange	How Great Thou Art	2:25
17.	"Farther Along"	Traditional: arr. by Elvis Presley	How Great Thou Art	4:03
18.	"Stand by Me"	Traditional: arr. by Elvis Presley	How Great Thou Art	2:27
19.	"Without Him"	Mylon LeFevre	How Great Thou Art	2:27
20.	"So High"	Traditional; arr. by Elvis Presley	How Great Thou Art	1:56
21.	"Where Could I Go But to the Lord?"	James B. Coats	How Great Thou Art	3:35
22.	"By and By"	Traditional; arr. by Elvis Presley	How Great Thou Art	1:49
23.	"If the Lord Wasn't Walking by My Side"	Henry Slaughter	How Great Thou Art	1:37
24.	"Run On"	Traditional; arr. by Elvis Presley	How Great Thou Art	2:21
25.	"Where No One Stands Alone"	Mosie Lister	How Great Thou Art	2:42
26.	"We Call on Him"	Traditional; arr. by Elvis Presley	You'll Never Walk Alone	2:12
27.	"You'll Never Walk Alone"	Rodgers and Hammerstein	You'll Never Walk Alone	2:11
28.	"Who Am I?"	Charles "Rusty" Goodman	You'll Never Walk Alone	3:20
29.	"Life"	Shirl Milete	Love Letters from Elvis	3:10

=== Disc 2 ===
No.	Title	Writer(s)	Original release	Length
1.	"Only Believe"	D. Paul Rader	Love Letters from Elvis	2:50
2.	"He Touched Me"	William J. Gaither	He Touched Me	2:40
3.	"I've Got Confidence"	Andrae Crouch	He Touched Me	2:23
4.	"Amazing Grace"	William J. Gaither; arr. by Elvis Presley	He Touched Me	3:36
5.	"Seeing Is Believing"	Red West, Glen Spreen	He Touched Me	2:55
6.	"He Is My Everything"	Dallas Frazier	He Touched Me	2:42
7.	"Bosom of Abraham"	William Johnson, George McFadden, Phillip Brooks	He Touched Me	1:37
8.	"An Evening Prayer"	C. Maude Battersby, Charles H. Gabriel	He Touched Me	1:56
9.	"Lead Me, Guide Me"	Doris Akers	He Touched Me	2:42
10.	"There Is No God but God"	Bill Kenny	He Touched Me	2:21
11.	"A Thing Called Love"	Jerry Reed Hubbard	He Touched Me	2:27
12.	"I. John"	William Johnson, George McFadden, Phillip Brooks	He Touched Me	2:18
13.	"Reach Out to Jesus"	Ralph Carmichael	He Touched Me	3:13
14.	"Miracle of the Rosary"	Lee Denson	Elvis Now	2:16
15.	"Put Your Hand in the Hand"	Gene MacLellan	Elvis Now	3:17
16.	"I Got a Feelin' in My Body"	Dennis Linde	Good Times	3:33
17.	"Help Me"	Larry Gatlin	Promised Land	2:29
18.	"If That Isn't Love"	Dottie Rambo	Good Times	2:33
19.	"Help Me" (live)	Larry Gatlin	Elvis as Recorded Live on Stage in Memphis	2:42
20.	"Why Me, Lord?" (live)	Kris Kristofferson	Elvis as Recorded Live on Stage in Memphis	3:26
21.	"How Great Thou Art" (live)	Stuart K. Hine, original by Carl Boberg	Elvis as Recorded Live on Stage in Memphis	2:09
22.	"Farther Along" (rehearsal)	Traditional; arr. by Elvis Presley	That's the Way It Is (special edition)	2:36
23.	"Oh Happy Day" (rehearsal)	Edwin Hawkins	That's the Way It Is (special edition)	2:25
24.	"I, John"	William Johnson, George McFadden, Phillip Brooks	Elvis on Tour	2:34
25.	"Bosom of Abraham"	William Johnson, George McFadden, Phillip Brooks	Elvis on Tour	2:00
26.	"You Better Run"	Traditional	Elvis on Tour	2:12
27.	"Lead Me, Guide Me"	Doris Akers	Elvis on Tour	2:11
28.	"Turn Your Eyes upon Jesus" / "Nearer My God to Thee"	Helen Howarth Lemmel / Sarah Fuller Flower Adams	Elvis on Tour	2:22

=== Disc 3 ===
No.	Title	Writer(s)	Original release	Length
1.	"When the Saints Go Marchin' In"	Katharine Purvis, James Milton Black	1956 home recording	3:19
2.	"Just a Little Talk with Jesus"	Cleavant Derricks	"Million Dollar Quartet" sessions	4:09
3.	"Jesus Walked That Lonesome Valley"	Traditional	"Million Dollar Quartet" sessions	3:28
4.	"I Shall Not Be Moved"	Traditional; arr. by Elvis Presley	"Million Dollar Quartet" sessions	2:15
5.	"(There'll Be) Peace in the Valley (For Me)"	Thomas A. Dorsey	"Million Dollar Quartet" sessions	1:33
6.	"Down by the Riverside"	Traditional	"Million Dollar Quartet" sessions	2:26
7.	"Farther Along"	Traditional; arr. by Elvis Presley	"Million Dollar Quartet" sessions	2:08
8.	"Blessed Jesus (Hold My Hand)"	Traditional; arr. by Elvis Presley	"Million Dollar Quartet" sessions	1:26
9.	"On the Jericho Road"	Traditional; arr. by Elvis Presley	"Million Dollar Quartet" sessions	0:52
10.	"I Just Can't Make It by Myself"	Clara Ward	"Million Dollar Quartet" sessions	1:04
11.	"I Hear a Sweet Voice Calling"	Bill Monroe	"Million Dollar Quartet" sessions	0:36
12.	"When the Saints Go Marchin' In"	Traditional	"Million Dollar Quartet" sessions	2:18
13.	"Softly and Tenderly"	Traditional	"Million Dollar Quartet" sessions	2:42
14.	"(There'll Be) Peace in the Valley (For Me)"	Thomas A. Dorsey	Peace in the Valley (EP)	1:33
15.	"It Is No Secret (What God Can Do)"	Carl Stuart Hamblen	Peace in the Valley (EP)	3:09
16.	"I Believe"	Ervin Drake, Irvin Graham, Jimmy Shirl, Al Stillman	Peace in the Valley (EP)	2:05
17.	"Take My Hand, Precious Lord"	Thomas A. Dorsey	Peace in the Valley (EP)	3:16
18.	"I Asked the Lord" (alternate)	Traditional	The Home Recordings	2:27
19.	"He"	Traditional; arr. by Elvis Presley	In a Private Moment	2:27
20.	"Oh How I Love Jesus"	Frederick Whitfield	In a Private Moment	2:45
21.	"Show Me Thy Ways, O Lord"	Traditional	The Home Recordings	3:35
22.	"Hide Thou Me"	Traditional; arr. by Elvis Presley	In a Private Moment	3:45
23.	"Down by the Riverside" / "When the Saints Go Marchin' In"	Traditional	Frankie and Johnny	3:37
24.	"Sing You Children"	Fred Burch, Gerald Nelson	Easy Come, Easy Go (EP)	2:08
25.	"Swing Down Sweet Chariot"	Traditional; arr. by Elvis Presley	Elvis: A Legendary Performer Volume 4	2:42
26.	"Let Us Pray"	Buddy Kaye, Ben Weisman	You'll Never Walk Alone	2:12
27.	"Sometimes I Feel like a Motherless Child" / "Where Could I Go but to the Lord?" / "Up Above My Head" / "Saved" (gospel medley)	Traditional / James B. Coats / Sister Rosetta Tharpe / Jerry Leiber and Mike Stoller	NBC-TV Special	2:11
28.	"The Lord's Prayer"	Matthew 6:9–13, Albert Hay Malotte	A Hundred Years from Now	1:34
29.	"How Great Thou Art" (live)	Stuart K. Hine, original by Carl Boberg	Elvis in Concert (1977)	3:10
30.	"(There'll Be) Peace in the Valley (for Me)"	Thomas A. Dorsey	excerpt from The Ed Sullivan Show	3:10

== Personnel ==
- The Jordanaires
- The Imperials
- The Nashville Edition
- J.D. Sumner & The Stamps
- The Sweet Inspirations
- Kathy Westmoreland
- Sherrill Nielsen

=== Million Dollar Quartet ===
- Elvis Presley
- Carl Perkins
- Jerry Lee Lewis
- Johnny Cash
