= Elvis Country (I'm 10,000 Years Old) =

Studio album by Elvis Presley
- Released: January 7, 1971
- Recorded: June 4–8 and September 22, 1970
- Studio: RCA Studio B (Nashville)
- Genre: Country
- Length: 38:49
- Label: RCA Victor
- Producer: Felton Jarvis

Elvis Presley chronology
That's the Way It Is (1970)	Elvis Country (I'm 10,000 Years Old) (1971)	You'll Never Walk Alone (1971)

Singles from Elvis Country
- 1. "I Really Don't Want to Know” b/w “There Goes My Everything" Released: December 8, 1970

Professional ratings
Review scores
Source	Rating
AllMusic	4/5 stars
Christgau's Record Guide	B−
MusicHound	4/5 stars
Rough Guides	5/5 stars

Elvis Country (I'm 10,000 Years Old) is the thirteenth studio album by American singer and musician Elvis Presley, released on RCA Records (LSP 4460) in January 1971. Recorded at RCA Studio B in Nashville, it reached number 12 on the Billboard 200. It peaked at number six in the United Kingdom, selling over one million copies worldwide. It was certified Gold on December 1, 1977, by the Recording Industry Association of America.

The lead single of the album, "I Really Don't Want to Know" backed with "There Goes My Everything", was released on December 8, 1970, and peaked at number 21 on the Billboard Hot 100, number two on the Adult Contemporary chart, and number 23 on the country singles chart.

== Content ==
The bulk of the album came from five days of recording sessions in June 1970 which yielded 35 usable tracks. Presley performed every track "live", recording his vocal part in the same take as the band, as was standard practice for him. Eight tracks from the session were released two months earlier in November 1970 on the That's the Way It Is album. During the sessions, Presley and producer Felton Jarvis realized they had several country songs in hand and decided to record several more to create a full album of country material. Needing two more satisfactory tracks, Elvis returned to the same studio in September where he recorded "Snowbird" and a manic, one-take version of "Whole Lotta Shakin' Goin' On."

Nearly every style of country music is represented: bluegrass, honky tonk, Western swing, rockabilly, countrypolitan, and even the then-nascent "outlaw" movement. Snippets of the song "I Was Born About Ten Thousand Years Ago" act as a bridge between each track.

After this album, Presley returned to his usual practice of recording a seemingly random batch of songs on each trip to the recording studio, letting his producer assemble them into albums.

== Cover ==
The sleeve image is a colourised photograph of Elvis as an infant, with an inset of the original shot of the artist flanked by his parents Vernon and Gladys Presley, anticipating by several decades the rap fashion of musicians using their baby pictures for album covers.

== Reissues ==
The June 14, 2004, compact disc reissue included six bonus tracks from the same sessions. Three of them had been previously released on the LP Love Letters from Elvis. The others were the B-side "Where Did They Go, Lord?" (a track that made its first LP appearance on the 1978 compilation He Walks Beside Me) and the unabridged version of "I Was Born About Ten Thousand Years Ago" later released on Elvis Now.

In 2008 Elvis Country was reissued on the Follow That Dream label in a special two-disc edition that contained the original album tracks along with numerous alternate takes. In late 2011, RCA Legacy (owned by Sony) announced a two-CD "Legacy Edition" set of the Elvis Country album. Enthusiasm was short-lived as fans quickly criticized the decision to pair the album with the leftover set that was 1970's Love Letters LP instead of compiling rarities from the acclaimed Elvis Country set. However, both albums originated from the same recording sessions. An unreleased Quadraphonic version is also known to exist.

== Track listing ==
=== Original release ===
Side one
No.	Title	Writer(s)	Recording date	Length
1.	"Snowbird"	Gene MacLellan	September 22, 1970	2:17
2.	"Tomorrow Never Comes"	Johnny Bond, Ernest Tubb	June 7, 1970	4:07
3.	"Little Cabin on the Hill"	Bill Monroe, Lester Flatt	June 4, 1970	1:58
4.	"Whole Lotta Shakin' Goin' On"	Dave "Curlee" Williams, Sunny David	September 22, 1970	3:10
5.	"Funny How Time Slips Away"	Willie Nelson	June 7, 1970	4:32
6.	"I Really Don't Want to Know"	Howard Barnes, Don Robertson	June 7, 1970	2:59

Side two
No.	Title	Writer(s)	Recording date	Length
1.	"There Goes My Everything"	Dallas Frazier	June 8, 1970	3:10
2.	"It's Your Baby, You Rock It"	Shirl Milete, Nora Fowler	June 5, 1970	3:04
3.	"The Fool"	Naomi Ford, Lee Hazlewood	June 4, 1970	2:34
4.	"Faded Love"	Bob Wills, Johnnie Lee Wills	June 7, 1970	3:19
5.	"I Washed My Hands in Muddy Water"	Joe Babcock	June 7, 1970	3:54
6.	"Make the World Go Away"	Hank Cochran	June 7, 1970	3:46

=== 2000 reissue bonus tracks ===
Tracks 1–12 are from the original album
No.	Title	Writer(s)	Recording date	Length
13.	"It Ain't No Big Thing (But It's Growing)"	Shorty Hall, Alice Joy Merritt, Neal Merritt	June 6, 1970	2:47
14.	"A Hundred Years From Now"	Lester Flatt, Earl Scruggs	June 4, 1970	1:40
15.	"If I Were You"	Gerald Nelson	June 8, 1970	3:01
16.	"Got My Mojo Working" / "Keep Your Hands Off of It"	Preston Foster, Elvis Presley	June 5, 1970	4:34
17.	"Where Did They Go, Lord"	Dallas Frazier, A.L. "Doodle" Owens	September 22, 1970	2:27
18.	"I Was Born About Ten Thousand Years Ago"	Traditional	June 4, 1970	3:13

=== 2012 legacy edition reissue ===
Disc one
No.	Title	Writer(s)	Length
1.	"Snowbird"	Gene MacLellan	2:17
2.	"Tomorrow Never Comes"	Johnny Bond and Ernest Tubb	4:07
3.	"Little Cabin on the Hill"	Bill Monroe and Lester Flatt	1:58
4.	"Whole Lotta Shakin' Goin' On"	Dave "Curly" Williams and Sunny David	3:10
5.	"Funny How Time Slips Away"	Willie Nelson	4:32
6.	"I Really Don't Want to Know"	Howard Barnes and Don Robertson	2:59
7.	"There Goes My Everything"	Dallas Frazier	3:10
8.	"It's Your Baby You Rock It"	Shirl Milete and Nora Fowler	3:04
9.	"The Fool"	Naomi Ford and Lee Hazlewood	2:34
10.	"Faded Love"	Bob Wills and Johnnie Lee Wills	3:19
11.	"I Washed My Hands in Muddy Water"	Joe Babcock	3:54
12.	"Make the World Go Away"	Hank Cochran	3:46
13.	"I Was Born About Ten Thousand Years Ago"	Traditional	3:13
14.	"A Hundred Years From Now"	Lester Flatt and Earl Scruggs	1:40
15.	"Where Did They Go, Lord"	Dallas Frazier and A.L. "Doodle" Owens	2:27

Disc two
No.	Title	Writer(s)	Length
1.	"Love Letters"	Edward Heyman, Kang Dadang	2:53
2.	"When I'm Over You"	Shirl Milete	2:28
3.	"If I Were You"	Gerald Nelson	3:01
4.	"Got My Mojo Working" / "Keep Your Hands Off of It"	Preston Foster, Elvis Presley	4:36
5.	"Heart of Rome"	Alan Blaikley, Ken Howard, Geoff Stephens	2:56
6.	"Only Believe"	Paul Rader	2:50
7.	"This is Our Dance"	Les Reed, Geoff Stephens	3:16
8.	"Cindy, Cindy"	Dolores Fuller, Buddy Kaye, Ben Weisman	2:32
9.	"I'll Never Know"	Fred Karger, Sid Wayne, Ben Weisman	2:25
10.	"It Ain't No Big Thing (But It's Growing)"	Shorty Hall, Alice Joy Merritt, Neal Merritt	2:49
11.	"Life"	Shirl Milete	3:10
12.	"The Sound of Your Cry"	Bernie Baum, Bill Giant, Buddy Kaye	3:17
13.	"Sylvia"	Geoff Stephens and Les Reed	3:17
14.	"Rags to Riches"	Richard Adler and Jerry Ross	1:54

== Personnel ==
Sourced from Keith Flynn.

- Elvis Presley – lead vocals, acoustic rhythm guitar on "I Was Born About Ten Thousand Years Ago" and "Little Cabin on the Hill", harmony vocals on "Snowbird" and "There Goes My Everything"
- James Burton – lead guitar, dobro
- Chip Young – acoustic rhythm guitar
- Charlie Hodge – acoustic rhythm guitar except "Snowbird" and "Whole Lotta Shakin’ Goin’ On"
- Eddie Hinton – lead guitar on "Snowbird" and "Whole Lotta Shakin' Goin' On"
- Norbert Putnam – bass
- David Briggs – piano; organ on "Little Cabin on the Hill" and "I Washed My Hands in Muddy Water"
- Jerry Carrigan – drums
- Charlie McCoy – harmonica, organ, vibraphone on "I Really Don't Want to Know"

Overdubbed

- Farrell Morris – percussion and timpani on "Snowbird", "Funny How Time Slips Away", "Make the World Go Away", "I Really Don't Want To Know", "Faded Love", and "Tomorrow Never Comes"
- Harold Bradley – electric sitar on "Snowbird"
- Weldon Myrick – pedal steel guitar on "Little Cabin on the Hill"
- Bobby Thompson – banjo (on "Little Cabin on the Hill")
- Buddy Spicher – fiddle (on "Little Cabin on the Hill")
- The Imperials Quartet – backing vocals
- The Jordanaires – backing vocals (on "Funny How Time Slips Away", "There Goes My Everything", and "Make The World Go Away")
- Joe Babcock – backing vocals
- Millie Kirkham – backing vocals
- Mary Holladay – backing vocals
- Ginger Holladay – backing vocals
- June Page – backing vocals
- Sonja Montgomery – backing vocals
- Dolores Edgin – backing vocals
- Mary Greene – backing vocals
- Temple Riser – backing vocals
- Cam Mullins – string arrangements
- Don Tweedy – string arrangements
- Bergen White – horn arrangements

Production staff

- Felton Jarvis – producer
