= Elvis Inspirational =

Compilation album by Elvis Presley
- Released: February 28, 2006
- Recorded: October 31, 1960 – December 16, 1973
- Genre: Pop, gospel
- Length: 58:27
- Label: RCA-Sony BMG

Elvis Presley chronology
Hitstory (2005)	Elvis Inspirational (2006)	Elvis Rock (2006)

Elvis Inspirational, RCA's 2006 compilation, is part of a set of six theme-based compilations that also includes Elvis Rock, Elvis Country, Elvis Movies, Elvis Live and Elvis R&B and is made up of pop and gospel recordings seen to be inspirational, including Paul Simon's "Bridge Over Troubled Water," Neil Diamond's "And the Grass Won't Pay No Mind," Mac Davis' "In the Ghetto," "Danny Boy," and "The Impossible Dream".

== Track listing ==
No.	Title	Writer(s)	Length
1.	"If I Can Dream"	W. Earl Brown	3:09
2.	"Crying in the Chapel"	Artie Glenn	2:23
3.	"Amazing Grace"	John Newton	3:33
4.	"Danny Boy" (Elvis Inspirational version)	Frederic Weatherly	3:56
5.	"In The Ghetto"	Mac Davis	2:45
6.	"Mama Liked the Roses" (Elvis Inspirational version)	Johnny Christopher	2:47
7.	"An Evening Prayer"	C. Gabriel Battersby	1:54
8.	"Put Your Hand in the Hand" (Elvis Inspirational version)	Gene MacLellan	3:16
9.	"You'll Never Walk Alone"	Oscar Hammerstein II	2:43
10.	"How Great Thou Art"	Carl Boberg	3:01
11.	"I'll Take You Home Again, Kathleen" (Elvis Inspirational version)	Thomas P. Westendorf	2:24
12.	"He Is My Everything"	Dallas Frazier	2:39
13.	"A Thing Called Love" (Elvis Inspirational version)	Jerry Reed	2:25
14.	"And the Grass Won't Pay No Mind" (Elvis Inspirational version)	Neil Diamond	3:10
15.	"If That Isn't Love"	Dottie Rambo	3:29
16.	"Help Me"	Larry Gatlin	2:28
17.	"Only Believe"	Paul Rader	2:48
18.	"Wonderful World" (Elvis Inspirational version)	D. Fletcher	2:12
19.	"Bridge over Troubled Water" (2003 Sony Remaster)	Paul Simon	4:28
20.	"The Impossible Dream" (Elvis Inspirational version)	Joe Darion	2:29

== Credits ==
AllMusic lists:

- A&R – John Hudson
- Art Direction – Erwin Gorostiza
- Audio Production, Compilation Producers – Roger Semon, Ernst Mikael Jørgensen
- Composers – C. Gabriel Battersby, W. Earl Brown, Johnny Christopher, Joe Darion, Mac Davis, Neil Diamond, Dallas Frazier, Charles H. Gabriel, Larry Gatlin, Artie Glenn, Oscar Hammerstein II, Stuart K. Hine, Mitch Leigh, Gene MacLellan, Paul Rader, Dottie Rambo, Jerry Reed, Richard Rodgers, Paul Simon
- Design – Jeffrey Schulz
- Executive Producer – Joseph DiMuro
- Liner Notes – Michael Hill
- Mastering – Vic Anesini
- Production Assistant – Rob Santos
- Project Coordinator – Jennifer Liebeskind
- Project Directors – Iris Maenza, Matthew Stringer
