= He Touched Me (album) =

Studio album by Elvis Presley
- Released: April 1972
- Recorded: March–June 1971
- Studio: RCA Studio B (Nashville, Tennessee)
- Genre: Gospel, contemporary Christian
- Length: 30:50
- Label: RCA Victor
- Producer: Felton Jarvis

Elvis Presley chronology
Elvis Now (1972)	He Touched Me (1972)	As Recorded at Madison Square Garden (1972)

Professional ratings
Review scores
Source	Rating
AllMusic	3.5/5 stars
Christgau's Record Guide	B+
MusicHound	3.5/5 stars
The Rolling Stone Album Guide	5/5 stars
Rough Guides	4/5 stars

He Touched Me is the seventeenth studio album by American singer and musician Elvis Presley, released in April 1972. A contemporary gospel music album, it earned him his second of three Grammy Awards. The album was his third and final studio gospel album and the most contemporary of the three. (Note: The other two being His Hand in Mine (1960) and How Great Thou Art (1967)) He Touched Me was certified Gold on March 27, 1992, and Platinum on July 15, 1999, by the RIAA.

== Track listings ==
=== Original LP release ===
Side one
No.	Title	Writer(s)	Recording date	Length
1.	"He Touched Me"	William J. Gaither	May 18, 1971	2:40
2.	"I've Got Confidence"	Andraé Crouch	May 18, 1971	2:23
3.	"Amazing Grace"	John Newton; arranged and adapted by Elvis Presley	March 15, 1971	3:36
4.	"Seeing Is Believing"	Red West, Glen Spreen	May 19, 1971	2:55
5.	"He Is My Everything"	Dallas Frazier	June 9, 1971	2:42
6.	"Bosom of Abraham"	William Johnson, George McFadden, Phillip Brooks	June 9, 1971	1:37

Side two
No.	Title	Writer(s)	Recording date	Length
1.	"An Evening Prayer"	C. Maude Battersby, Charles H. Gabriel	May 18, 1971	1:56
2.	"Lead Me, Guide Me"	Doris Akers	May 17, 1971	2:42
3.	"There Is No God But God"	Bill Kenny	June 9, 1971	2:21
4.	"A Thing Called Love"	Jerry Reed	May 19, 1971	2:27
5.	"I, John"	William Johnson, George McFadden, Phillip Brooks	June 8–10, 1971	2:18
6.	"Reach Out to Jesus"	Ralph Carmichael	June 8, 1971	3:13

=== 2008 CD Reissue ===
Tracks 1–12 are from the original release.
No.	Title	Writer(s)	Recording date	Length
13.	"Only Believe" (from Love Letters from Elvis)	Paul Rader	June 8, 1970	2:50
14.	"Put Your Hand in the Hand" (from Elvis Now)	Gene MacLellan	June 8, 1971	3:17
15.	"I Got a Feelin' in My Body" (from Good Times)	Dennis Linde	December 10, 1973	3:33
16.	"Help Me" (from Promised Land)	Larry Gatlin	December 12, 1973	2:27

=== Follow That Dream edition ===
The original album
No.	Title	Length
1.	"He Touched Me"	2:37
2.	"I've Got Confidence"	2:19
3.	"Amazing Grace"	3:32
4.	"Seeing is Believing"	2:51
5.	"He Is My Everything"	2:39
6.	"Bosom of Abraham"	1:34
7.	"An Evening Prayer"	1:53
8.	"Lead Me, Guide Me"	2:39
9.	"There Is No God But God"	2:18
10.	"A Thing Called Love"	2:23
11.	"I, John"	2:14
12.	"Reach Out To Jesus"	3:13

Alternate takes
No.	Title	Length
13.	"He Touched Me" (take 2)	2:53
14.	"An Evening Prayer" (take 2)	1:58
15.	"Seeing Is Believing" (takes 1–4)	7:09
16.	"A Thing Called Love" (take1)	2:40
17.	"He Is My Everything" (take 1)	3:58
18.	"Bosom of Abraham" (takes 2, 3)	2:40
19.	"Reach Out To Jesus" (takes 1–7 & 9)	6:48
20.	"The Lord's Prayer"	2:39

Alternate takes
No.	Title	Length
1.	"Johnny B. Goode"	1:08
2.	"He Touched Me" (take 3 [incomplete])	3:30
3.	"An Evening Prayer" (take 3)	2:54
4.	"Seeing Is Believing" (take 7)	3:58
5.	"A Thing Called Love" (rehearsal)	5:35
6.	"There Is No God But God" (takes 1, 2, 3, 4)	4:29
7.	"Amazing Grace" (takes 1, 2)	5:15
8.	"Seeing Is Believing" (takes 8, 9, 10)	5:50
9.	"An Evening Prayer" (take 5)	2:05
10.	"I, John" (take 1)	2:04
11.	"Bosom Of Abraham" (take 4)	1:45
12.	"A Thing Called Love" (takes 2, 3)	5:04
13.	"I've Got Confidence" (take 1)	3:09
14.	"An Evening Prayer" (take 7)	2:00
15.	"He Is My Everything" (takes 2, 4 [incomplete])	2:32
16.	"Bosom of Abraham" (takes 5, 7)	2:25
17.	"A Thing Called Love" (takes 4–7)	8:10
18.	"An Evening Prayer" (take 8)	2:17
19.	"Seeing Is Believing" (takes 11, 12)	4:28
Total length:		2:09:39

== Personnel ==
- Elvis Presley – arranger, vocals
- The Imperials – backing vocals
- Ginger Holladay – vocals
- Mary Holladay – backing vocals on "Amazing Grace"
- Millie Kirkham – vocals
- Kathy Westmoreland – vocals
- Sonja Montgomery – vocals
- June Page – vocals
- Temple Riser – vocals
- The Nashville Edition – backing vocals on "Amazing Grace"
- James Burton – guitar
- Chip Young – guitar
- Charlie Hodge – acoustic rhythm guitar
- Norbert Putnam – bass guitar
- David Briggs – organ, piano
- Charlie McCoy – organ, piano
- Joe Moscheo – organ, piano
- Kenny Buttrey – drums
- Jerry Carrigan – drums
- Joe Esposito – guitar (uncertain)

Technical

- Felton Jarvis – producer
- Al Pachucki – engineer

== Certifications ==
Region	Provider	Certification(s)
United States	RIAA	Platinum
