= Snowbird (album) =

Greatest hits album by Anne Murray
- Released: 1970
- Genre: Country
- Length: 24:26
- Label: Capitol
- Producer: Brian Ahern

Anne Murray chronology
Honey, Wheat and Laughter (1970)	Snowbird (1970)	Straight, Clean and Simple (1971)

Professional ratings
Review scores
Source	Rating
The Village Voice	B

Snowbird is a compilation album by Anne Murray issued in 1970 on Capitol Records. The album was released as the first Anne Murray album available in the United States and consists of songs previously included on This Way Is My Way and Honey, Wheat and Laughter. The photo and graphic design of the album cover are a reworking of the artwork on Honey, Wheat and Laughter. The album peaked at number 5 on the Billboard Country Albums chart and number 41 on the Billboard Pop Albums chart.

== Track listing ==
1. "Snowbird" - 2:08
2. "Fire and Rain" - 2:17
3. "Rain" - 2:05
4. "Break My Mind" - 2:43
5. "Bidin' My Time" - 2:32
6. "Put Your Hand in the Hand" - 3:12
7. "Running" - 2:01
8. "Musical Friends" - 2:26
9. "Get Together" - 2:39
10. "I'll Be Your Baby Tonight" - 2:50
