= Elvis Now =

Studio album by Elvis Presley
- Released: February 20, 1972
- Recorded: January 22, 1969 – June 8, 1971
- Studio: American Sound (Memphis, Tennessee); RCA Studio B (Nashville, Tennessee)
- Genre: Rock, country, gospel
- Length: 31:34
- Label: RCA Victor
- Producer: Felton Jarvis; Chips Moman ("Hey Jude")

Elvis Presley chronology
Elvis Sings The Wonderful World of Christmas (1971)	Elvis Now (1972)	He Touched Me (1972)

Singles from Elvis Now
- 1. "Until It's Time for You to Go" / "We Can Make the Morning" Released: January 4, 1972

Professional ratings
Review scores
Source	Rating
AllMusic	2.5/5 stars
MusicHound	3/5 stars
Rough Guides	2/5 stars

Elvis Now is the sixteenth studio album by American singer Elvis Presley, released in February 1972. The album entered Billboard on February 12, and reached No. 43. The only single from the album, "Until It's Time for You to Go" / "We Can Make the Morning" reached number 9 on the Easy Listening chart in the US in March 1972 and number 5 on the UK Singles Chart in April 1972. The album was certified Gold on March 27, 1992, by the RIAA. "Sylvia" became a hit for Presley in Brazil in the 1970s.

== Content ==
Despite the "now" in the title, the tracks on this album were recorded anywhere from one to three years before its release. The Beatles' "Hey Jude" was a leftover from the sessions at the American Studio in Memphis in early 1969. "Sylvia" and "I Was Born About Ten Thousand Years Ago" were recorded during the Nashville sessions of June 1970 (the latter had been released in fragmentary form on the Elvis Country album). The rest of the songs were from more recent sessions held at RCA Studio B in Nashville in March, May, and June 1971.

Unlike Presley's other albums of that period (Elvis Country, He Touched Me and Elvis Sings The Wonderful World of Christmas, each dedicated to a particular genre) Elvis Now encompasses a variety of genres, including country, gospel, soul and pop.

== Reissues ==
In 2010, an extended version of the album was released as part of the FTD collector series. It consists of the original 1972 album and a number of bonus tracks, originating from the 1971 Nashville sessions: two non-album singles from 1971 ("I'm Leavin'" and "It's Only Love"), a B-side from the upcoming "An American Trilogy" single ("The First Time Ever I Saw Your Face") as well as plenty of outtakes, including "Don't Think Twice, It's All Right" informal jam, lasting more than nine minutes (its shortened version having been included on the 1973 Elvis album).

== Track listing ==
=== Original release ===
Side one
No.	Title	Writer(s)	Recording date	Length
1.	"Help Me Make It Through the Night"	Kris Kristofferson	May 16, 1971	2:49
2.	"Miracle of the Rosary"	Lee Denson	May 15, 1971	1:52
3.	"Hey Jude"	John Lennon, Paul McCartney	January 22, 1969	4:31
4.	"Put Your Hand in the Hand"	Gene MacLellan	June 8, 1971	3:17
5.	"Until It's Time for You to Go"	Buffy Sainte-Marie	May 17, 1971	3:59

Side two
No.	Title	Writer(s)	Recording date	Length
1.	"We Can Make the Morning"	Jay Ramsey	May 20, 1971	3:56
2.	"Early Mornin' Rain"	Gordon Lightfoot	March 15, 1971	2:57
3.	"Sylvia"	Geoff Stephens, Les Reed	June 8, 1970	3:18
4.	"Fools Rush In (Where Angels Fear to Tread)"	Johnny Mercer, Rube Bloom	May 18, 1971	3:18
5.	"I Was Born About Ten Thousand Years Ago"	adapted and arranged by Elvis Presley	June 4, 1970	3:12

=== 2010 reissue (FTD) ===
Disc one
No.	Title	Length
1.	"Help Me Make It Through the Night"
2.	"Miracle of the Rosary"
3.	"Hey Jude"
4.	"Put Your Hand in the Hand"
5.	"Until It's Time for You to Go"
6.	"We Can Make the Morning"
7.	"Early Mornin' Rain"
8.	"Sylvia"
9.	"Fools Rush In (Where Angels Fear to Tread)"
10.	"I Was Born About Ten Thousand Years Ago"
11.	"I'm Leavin'"
12.	"It's Only Love"
13.	"The First Time Ever I Saw Your Face"
14.	"Don't Think Twice, It's All Right" (unedited master)
15.	"Help Me Make It Through The Night" (takes 8–10)
16.	"Fools Rush In (Where Angels Fear To Tread)" (takes 11, 12 & 14)
17.	"Lady Madonna"

Disc two
No.	Title	Length
1.	"Help Me Make It Through The Night" (takes 1–3)
2.	"Early Mornin' Rain" (Takes 1, 2 & 9)
3.	"Fools Rush In (Where Angels Fear to Tread)" (takes 5 & 6)
4.	"Until It's Time for You to Go" (takes 1–5)
5.	"I'm Leavin'" (take 1)
6.	"It's Only Love" (takes 1–4)
7.	"I Shall Be Released"
8.	"It's Only Love" (takes 6 & 7)
9.	"Help Me Make It Through the Night" (takes 4–7)
10.	"Fools Rush In (Where Angels Fear To Tread)" (takes 8 & 9)
11.	"Put Your Hand In The Hand" (take 1)
12.	"It's Only Love" (takes 8 & 9)
13.	"Miracle of the Rosary" (take 1)
14.	"Until It's Time for You to Go" (takes 6 & 7)
15.	"Fools Rush In (Where Angels Fear to Tread)" (take 10)
16.	"Early Morning Rain" (take 11)
17.	"Help Me Make It Through The Night" (take 15)
18.	"I'm Leavin'" (takes 2 & 3)

== Personnel ==
Sourced from Keith Flynn.

- Elvis Presley – lead vocals; acoustic rhythm guitar on "Hey Jude" (uncertain), “Sylvia” (uncertain) and “I Was Born About Ten Thousand Years Ago”
- James Burton – lead guitar
- Norbert Putnam – bass
- Chip Young – rhythm guitar
- Charlie Hodge – acoustic rhythm guitar
- David Briggs – piano
- Jerry Carrigan – drums, percussion on "Fools Rush In (Where Angels Fear to Tread", "We Can Make the Morning" and "Help Me Make It Through the Night"
- Charlie McCoy – harmonica on "I Was Born About Ten Thousand Years Ago" and "Early Morning Rain"; organ, percussion, or harmonica on "Sylvia" and "Miracle of the Rosary"; organ on "Help Me Make It Through the Night", "Put Your Hand in the Hand" and "Until It's Time For You To Go"
- Kenny Buttrey – drums on "Until It's Time For You To Go", "Fools Rush In (Where Angels Fear to Tread)", "We Can Make the Morning" and "Help Me Make It Through the Night"
- Reggie Young – lead guitar on "Hey Jude"
- Bobby Wood – piano on "Hey Jude"
- Bobby Emmons – organ on "Hey Jude"
- Tommy Cogbill – bass on "Hey Jude"
- Mike Leech – bass on "Hey Jude"
- Gene Chrisman – drums on "Hey Jude"
- Joe Moscheo – piano on "Fools Rush In (Where Angels Fear to Tread)"
- Glen Spreen – organ on "Until It's Time For You to Go"
