= Honey, Wheat and Laughter =

Studio album by Anne Murray
- Released: 1970
- Recorded: Spring 1970
- Studios: Bay Studios (Toronto, Ontario, Canada); Vanguard Studios (New York City, New York, USA)
- Genre: Country
- Length: 25:54
- Label: Capitol
- Producer: Brian Ahern

Anne Murray chronology
This Way Is My Way (1969)	Honey, Wheat and Laughter (1970)	Snowbird (1970)

Honey, Wheat and Laughter is the third studio album by Canadian singer Anne Murray issued in 1970 on Capitol Records.

Honey, Wheat and Laughter contained work by, among others, James Taylor and Gene MacLellan. The album was released only in Canada; however, after Murray's single "Snowbird" gained traction in the United States, several of its tracks were re-released on the 1970 compilation Snowbird.

MacLellan's "Put Your Hand in the Hand" would become a top-ten hit for the band Ocean in 1971.

== Reception ==
The album won the 1971 Juno Award for Best Produced MOR Album.

== Track listing ==
No.	Title	Writer(s)	Length
1.	"Fire and Rain"	James Taylor	2:22
2.	"Rain"	José Feliciano	2:08
3.	"Someone Else Today"	Peter Pringle	3:10
4.	"Head Above the Water"	Steven Rhymer	1:34
5.	"Break My Mind"	John D. Loudermilk	2:47
6.	"The Call"	Gene MacLellan	2:10
7.	"Put Your Hand in the Hand"	MacLellan	2:48
8.	"Running"	Pringle	2:05
9.	"Musical Friends"	Bruce Cockburn	2:26
10.	"Get Together"	Chet Powers	2:43
11.	"Night Owl"	Taylor	2:23

== Personnel ==
Musicians

- Anne Murray – vocals
- Brian Browne – keyboards
- Bill Speer – keyboards
- John Mills-Cockell – synthesizers
- Brian Ahern – guitars
- Amos Garrett – guitars
- Buddy Cage – steel guitar
- Skip Beckwith – bass
- Ron Rully – percussion
- Bruce Philp – percussion
- Tommy Graham – percussion
- Brent Titcomb – harmonica
- Steven Rhymer – recorder

Music arrangements

- Brian Ahern – arrangements
- Athan Katsos – synthesizer arrangements
- Rick Wilkins – brass and string arrangements

=== Production ===
- Paul White – executive producer
- Brian Ahern – producer
- Frank Bertin – engineer
- Jeff Hulko – engineer
- Bill Roncken – engineer
- Miles Wilkinson – engineer
- Jeff Zaraya – engineer
