= He Touched Me =

He Touched Me may refer to:

- He Touched Me (album), a 1972 gospel music album by Elvis Presley
- "He Touched Me" (song), a 1963 song by Bill Gaither, recorded by Elvis Presley
- "He Touched Me", a song written by Ira Levin and Milton Schafer from the musical Drat! The Cat!
