= So Tough (song) =

1958 song by Gary Mears

Single by Original Casuals
- B-side: "I Love My Darling"
- Released: December 1957
- Genre: Doo-wop
- Length: 2:15
- Label: Back Beat
- Songwriter: Gary Mears

"So Tough" is a song written by Gary Mears, and recorded by both the Original Casuals and The Kuf-Linx in 1958. Both versions charted. On March 17, 1958, Billboard listed "So Tough" as tied for Number 76 on "Top 100 Sides for Survey Week Ending March 8". On February 19, 1958, the Casuals performed the song on American Bandstand. The song topped out at #42 on the Hot 100 chart, and #6 on the Most Played R&B By Jockeys chart. In Canada the 2 versions co-charted at number 18 on March 10 and 17, 1958. The Casuals version went further, peaking at number 12 on March 24.
