= You'll Never Walk Alone (disambiguation) =

"You'll Never Walk Alone" is a song from the 1945 musical Carousel.

You'll Never Walk Alone may also refer to:

- You'll Never Walk Alone (Doris Day album), studio album
- You'll Never Walk Alone (Elvis Presley album), compilation
- You'll Never Walk Alone (Ray Donovan), television episode

== See also ==
- You Never Walk Alone, the 2017 reissue of BTS's 2016 album Wings
