= Jay Ramsey =

American singer-songwriter

Gerald Hugh Ramsey (a.k.a. Jay Ramsey) was an American singer, songwriter, musician, and performer. As a recording artist in the 1950s, 1960s, and 1970s, Ramsey had releases on several record labels including United Artist Records, Reprise Records, Casablanca Records, ABC Records and Hanover Records. His songs have been recorded by popular artists including Elvis Presley, Conway Twitty, Roy Clark, Johnny Tillotson, and Billy Mize. His song "We Can Make the Morning" was included on Presley's 1972 Gold award-winning album Elvis Now on RCA Records. He died on 26 April 2025.

== Biography ==
Ramsey grew up in Sanger, Texas and attended Sanger High School. When he was 14 years old his parents took him to donate used clothing to an orphanage and while there he noticed his father's previously donated guitar sitting against a wall in the director's office. He asked the director about the guitar and was told he could take it home. After one lesson from his father, he taught himself to play. Ramsey began writing songs at the age of 16 and began performing in a band while in high school. He attended college at the University of North Texas in Denton, Texas. In 1962 he married Joan Speck of Celina, Texas, and together they have two daughters. Ramsey and Speck have since divorced.

=== Recording career ===
In high school, Ramsey was a member of the Denton, Texas group Kids from Texas. The band was signed to New York City label Hanover Records in 1958 and released the single, "Long Legged Linda" b/w the Gerald H. Ramsey song "I'm So Lonely" (Hanover Records release #4500).

In the early 1960s, Ramsey met WRR Dallas disc jockey Bob Kelly at Kelly's Dallas recording studio, Top Ten Recording Studio. Kelly was a well known disc jockey at Dallas radio station WRR, a record producer, and recording engineer. In 1962 Ramsey's first single "Smooth Talking Woman" b/w "Look Away Love" was released on Kelly's record label, Libra Records, under the name Jay Ramsey & The Contempos (Libra release #B.K-1001)

In 1963, Ramsey, Bob Kelly, Frank Cole, and Jerry Brown formed the band, The Expressions. The group released a single with Chicago-based Smash Records, a subsidiary of Mercury Records. Ramsey's song "Thrill" was the A-side b/w "Come Back Karen" which was written by the band (Smash Records release #S-1848). The single had no chart success.

In 1965, The Expressions were signed by Reprise Records. Reprise released a single with two of Ramsey's songs "One Plus One" b/w "Playboy" (Reprise Records #0360). In 1965, they became a 5-piece self-contained band by adding Kirby St. Romain. The five members then performed and recorded together with no personnel changes for over 10 years.

By 1968 the band had changed its name to Expression and in 1971 they recorded an album for Mediarts Records entitled "Texas/Nevada Border" (Mediarts Records release #41-9). The label released the single "California is Just Mississippi" b/w "Let Us Pray" (Mediarts Records release #ME-104). The song made it to the top ten in several major markets, but never charted nationally. This single was also released in Germany by United Artists Records (United Artists #35 250).

=== Major label success ===
In the 1970s, Jay signed with Surety Songs and Blue Crest Music (both Nashville publishing companies) and worked for a while as a full-time songwriter.

In 1971, Kenny Price recorded Ramsey's song "Tonopah Highway" on his RCA Records album The Sheriff of Boone County (LSP-4527).

In 1972, Ramsey's song "We Can Make The Morning" was included in Elvis Presley's famed album Elvis Now. Ramsey's song "We Can Make the Morning" was also included on the only single from the album, "Until It's Time for You to Go" / "We Can Make The Morning" (RCA release #2188). The album Elvis Now achieved Gold status from the Recording Industry's Association of America (RIAA). The single "Until It's Time for You to Go"/"We Can Make the Morning" reached number 9 on the Adult Contemporary Chart in the US and number 5 on the UK Singles Chart.

Also in 1972, Ramsey's song "Lord, Let It Rain" was recorded by Roy Clark and released on Dot Records album Roy Clark Country! (DOS-#25997) Clark's album peaked at number 10 on the US Country charts and number 112 on the US charts.

In 1973, Billy Mize released a single of Ramsey's song "California is Just Mississippi" with United Artists Records (UA-XW265-W) which reached number 99 on the Country Music charts.

In 1973, Ramsey released the single, "Draggin' Chains' b/w "The Saddest Song" (both Ramsey compositions) on ABC Records (ABC-#11385). In 1979, Conway Twitty recorded "Draggin' Chains" and another of Ramsey's songs, "If You Can't Write the Music," for his MCA Records album Cross Winds (MCA-3086). Cross Winds peaked at number 11 and spent 26 weeks on the Top Country Albums chart. "Draggin' Chains" was also released on Conway Twitty's single "Don't Take it Away" b/w "Draggin Chains" (MCA-41002). This single peaked at number 12 on the US Country Music charts and number 15 on the Canada Country Music charts.

In 1974, Billy Mize also recorded Ramsey's "Lord Let It Rain" for United Artists (UA-XW503-X).

In 1975, Ramsey recorded his songs on the single "Smokey Mountain Cowboy" b/w "Sunshine In My Morning" (NB-820) with Casablanca Records. "Smokey Mountain Cowboy" charted at number one on WKDA radio in Nashville. In 1977, Johnny Tillotson recorded Ramsey's song "Sunshine in My Morning" for his album Johnny Tillotson released by United Artists Records (UA-LA758-G).

=== Live performance ===
By 1964 The Expressions began touring nationally. The band toured for 16 years, playing the Playboy Club circuit and other venues throughout the continental US and Canada. By 1968 they were known simply as Expression and had become regulars in the Nevada casino circuit.

In 1982, Ramsey formed the Jay Ramsey Band. They performed together for 18 years. In recent years, a new Jay Ramsey Band has been formed, and he continues to perform in Texas and Las Vegas with his long-time friend and fellow founding member of The Expressions, Jerry Brown. Ramsey currently lives in Las Vegas. He was inducted into the Las Vegas Entertainers Hall Of Fame in 2017.

=== TV, film and advertising ===
In 2008, Ramsey signed many of his songs and recordings from the 1960s and 1970s to Fervor Records. The label has placed many of his songs in popular films and television shows, and have released much of his previously unreleased material.

== Discography ==
The Kids from Texas	Long-Legged Linda/I'm So Lonely (7", single)	Hanover Records	4500	US	1958
The Kids from Texas	Long-Legged Linda (7", single, promo)	Hanover Records	4500	US	1958
Expression	California Is Just Mississippi/Let Us Pray (7", single)	United Artists Records	35 250	Germany	Unknown
Expression	California Is Just Mississippi/Let Us Pray (7", single, promo)	Mediarts Records	ME-104	US	Unknown
Expression	Walk Away Son/Fallen Angel	Mediarts Records	ME-110	US	unknown
The Expressions	Thrill/ (Come Back) Karen (vinyl, 7", 45 RPM, single)	Smash Records	S-1848	US	1963
Jay Ramsey and the Contempos	Smooth Talking Woman b/w Look Away Love (7", single)	Libra Records	B.K.-1001	US	1962
Bill and Sherry	I Must Go/I Believe (You Put Me Down)	Tangerine Record Corp.	45-TRC-960	US	1966
The Festivals	You've Got the Makings of a Lover/High Wide and Handsome (7", single, promo)	Smash Records	S-2091	US	1967
Kenny Price	Sheriff of Boone County	RCA Records	LSP-4527	US	1971
Roy Clark	Roy Clark Country!	Dot Records	DOS-25997	US	1972
Elvis Presley	Until It's Time for You to Go / We Can Make the Morning (7", single)	RCA Victor	74-0619	Germany	1972
Elvis Presley	Until It's Time for You to Go/ We Can Make the Morning (7", single)	RCA Victor	74-0619	Canada	1972
Elvis Presley	Until It's Time for You to Go (7", single)	Jugoton, RCA Victor	SRCA-88560	Yugoslavia	1972
Elvis Presley	Until It's Time for You to Go / We Can Make the Morning (7", single)	RCA Victor	102033	Australia	1972
Elvis Presley	Elvis Now (LP, Album)	RCA Victor	LSP-4671	US	1972
Elvis Presley	We Can Make the Morning (7", single)	RCA Victor, RCA Victor, RCA Victor	74-0619, 49.850, 49850	France	1972
Elvis Presley	Elvis Now (Album)	RCA, RCA Victor	P8S-1898	US	1972
Elvis Presley	Elvis Now (LP)	RCA	LSP 4671	UK	1972
Elvis Presley	Elvis Now (LP)	RCA Victor, RCA Victor, RCA Victor	LSP 4671, LSP-4671, LSA 4671	Germany	1972
Elvis Presley	Elvis Now (LP)	RCA, RCA	LSP 4671, 26.21085	Germany	1972
Elvis Presley	Elvis Now (LP, Album)	RCA Victor	LSP-4671	US	1972
Elvis Presley	Elvis Now (LP, Album)	RCA Victor, RCA Victor	SF 8266, LSP 4671	UK	1972
Elvis Presley	Elvis Now (LP, Album)	RCA Victor	LSP-4671	Canada	1972
Elvis Presley	Elvis Now (LP, Album)	RCA Victor	443036	France	1972
Elvis Presley	Elvis Now (LP, Album)	RCA Victor	LSP-4671	South Africa	1972
Elvis Presley	Elvis Now (LP, Album)	RCA Victor	104.4020	Brazil	1972
Elvis Presley	Elvis Now (LP, Album, Gat)	RCA	SHP-6240	Japan	1972
Elvis Presley	Elvis Now (LP, Album, Mono)	RCA Victor	LPM-4671	Uruguay	1972
Elvis Presley	Elvis Now (LP, Album, RP)	RCA Victor	104.4020	Brazil	1972
Elvis Presley	Elvis Now (LP, Album, RE)	RCA Victor, RCA Victor	SF-8266, (APRS-2007)	UK	1972
Elvis Presley	Elvis Now (LP, Album, RE	RCA	RCA-6120	Japan	1973
Elvis Presley	Elvis Now (LP, Album, RE)	RCA Victor, RCA Victor	AFL1-4671, LSP-4671	US	1976
Jay Ramsey	Draggin' Chains/The Saddest Song	ABC Records	ABC-11385	US	1974
Billy Mize	California is Just Mississippi	United Artists Records	UA-XW265-W	US	1973
Billy Mize	Lord Let it Rain	United Artist Records	UA-XW503-X	US	1974
River City	Wind Me Up	Enterprise/Stax	ENA-9097	US	1974
Jay Ramsey	Sunshine In My Morning/Smokey Mountain Cowboy	Casablanca Records	NB-820	US	1975
Henson Cargill	It Hurts the Man	Electra	E-45234-B	US	1975
Larry Mahan	King of the Rodeo	Warner Bros.	BS-2959	US	1976
Johnny Tillotson	Johnny Tillotson	United Artists Records	UA-LA758-G	US	1977
Conway Twitty	Cross Winds	MCA Records	MCA-3086	US	1979
Conway Twitty	Cross Winds	MCA Records	MCA-3086	Canada	1979
Conway Twitty	Don't Take It Away/Draggin' Chains	MCA Records	MCA-41002	US	1979
Elvis Presley	Elvis Now (LP)	RCA	PL-42360	Spain	1984
Elvis Presley	Elvis Now (Cass, Album, RE)	Indalo	45912	Spain	1984
Elvis Presley	Elvis Now (LP, Album, RE)	Mirlo	CL-45912	Spain	1984
Elvis Presley	Elvis Now (LP)	RCA	PL 89543	Germany	1985
Elvis Presley	Elvis Now (LP, Album, RP)	RCA Victor	104.4020	Brazil	1986
Elvis Presley	Elvis Now (CD, Album, RE)	RCA	BVCP-1023	Japan	1993
Elvis Presley	Elvis Now (CD, Album, RM)	RCA	07863, 54671-2	Canada	1993
Elvis Presley	Elvis Now (CD, Album, RM)	RCA	74321, 148312	Europe	1993
Elvis Presley	Elvis Now (CD, Album, RM)	RCA	07863, 54671-2	US	1993
Elvis Presley	Elvis Now (CD)	BMG, Nederland BV	74321, 90640 2	Netherlands	1996
Elvis Presley	Elvis Now (CD, Album, RE, RM)	RCA, BMG, Nederland BV	SP5039	Netherlands	1996
Elvis Presley	Elvis Now (CD, Album)	RCA	BVCM-35032	Japan	1999
Elvis Presley	Elvis Now (CD, Album)	RBA Editores	74321, 784992	Spain	2000
Elvis Presley	Elvis Now (CD, Album, Ltd, Pap)	RCA, BMG	BVCM-35501	Japan	2008
Elvis Presley	Elvis Now (CD, Album, RE)	Sony Music	A761549	US	2009
Elvis Presley	Elvis Now (2xCD, Comp, RE, RM)	Follow That Dream Records, RCA, Sony Music	506020-975010	Europe	2010
Elvis Presley	Now...And Again (2xLP, album, Ltd, RE, S/Edition, 180)	RCA Victor, Follow That Dream Records	506020-975077	Denmark	2015
Various	Cult Hits of the 1960s Vol. 3	Fervor Records	FVRCD06075	US	6/15/2010
Various	Cult Hits of the 1970s Gold Vol. 1	Fervor Records	FVRCD06192	US	1/6/2015
Jay Ramsey	Jay Ramsey Anthology, Vol. 1	Fervor Records	FVRCD06148	US	11/19/2013
Jay Ramsey	Jay Ramsey Anthology, Vol. 2	Fervor Records	FVRCD06149	US	11/19/2013
Jay Ramsey	Jay Ramsey Anthology Vol. 3	Fervor Records	FVRCD06150	US	11/19/2013

== TV, film, and advertising ==
Artist	Song title	Program	Episode #	Type	Network/Source	Air Date
Jay Ramsey	Boogie Mama	American Ultra	--	Film	Lionsgate	11/26/2015
Jay Ramsey	Boogie Mama	Bloodline	309	SVOD	Netflix	5/26/2017
Jay Ramsey	Boogie Mama	Awkward	208	TV	MTV	8/16/2012
Jay Ramsey	Better Luck Next Time Little Girl	Ascension	103	TV	SyFy	1/1/2015
Jay Ramsey	Better Luck Next Time Little Girl	Ascension	104	TV	SyFy	1/1/2015
Jay Ramsey	Better Luck Next Time Little Girl	The Good Wife	619	TV	CBS	4/12/2015
Jay Ramsey	Better Luck Next Time Little Girl	The Playboy Club	106	TV	NBC	10/2011
Jay Ramsey	Better Luck Next Time Little Girl	Mad Men	306	TV	AMC	9/20/2009
Jay Ramsey	Summer Day Lucky Day	Ascension	103	TV	SyFy	1/1/2015
Jay Ramsey	Summer Day Lucky Day	Ascension	104	TV	SyFy	1/1/2015
Jay Ramsey	Kings and Queens	The Astronaut Wives Club	102	TV	ABC	6/25/2015
Jay Ramsey	Kings and Queens	The Astronaut Wives Club	102	TV	ABC	6/28/2015
Jay Ramsey	Kings and Queens	The Playboy Club	106	TV	NBC	10/2011
Jay Ramsey	Kings and Queens	Bumble, Superswipe Campaign	--	Ad	Internet	2017
Jay Ramsey	Kings and Queens	SMILF	103	TV	Showtime	11/19/17
Jay Ramsey	Kings and Queens	The Handmaid's Tale	209	SVOD	HULU	6/13/18
Jay Ramsey	How Many Times	Chicago PD	103	TV	ABC	1/26/2014
Jay Ramsey	Somewhere to Dream	Colony	107	TV	USA	2/25/2016
Jay Ramsey	Fallen Angel	God's Pocket	--	Film	Independent	1/17/2014
Jay Ramsey	Fallen Angel	Blindspot	210	TV	NBC	1/4/2017
Jay Ramsey	Golddigger	Mad Men	709	TV	AMC	4/12/2015
Jay Ramsey	Rocking Chair Blues	Parenthood	521	TV	NBC	4/10/2014
Jay Ramsey	High Wide & Handsome	Recovery Road	107	TV	Freeform	3/7/2016
Jay Ramsey	Cast the First Stone	Stonewall	--	Film	Independent	9/18/2015
Jay Ramsey	Gotta Keep Movin'	The Astronaut Wives Club	106	TV	ABC	7/23/2015
Jay Ramsey	Write Me an Ending	The Frontier	--	Film	Independent	3/15/2015
Jay Ramsey	Smooth Talking Woman	The Playboy Club	105	TV	NBC	10/2011
Jay Ramsey	Smooth Talking Woman	Whatever Linda	105	SVOD	--	10/2011
Jay Ramsey	You're My Lady	Red Oaks	207	SVOD	Amazon	11/11/2017
Jay Ramsey	Falling Out of Love with Love	My Friend Dahmer	--	Film	Independent	4/21/2017
Jay Ramsey	Hideaway	Chuck	--	Film	IFC	5/5/2017
Jay Ramsey	Hideaway	Homefront		TV	ABC	11/26/2013
Jay Ramsey	Wake Me in the Morning	Wrecked	209	TV	TBS	8/15/2017
Jay Ramsey	Call Me Free	American Made	--	Film	Universal Pictures	Europe: 8/23/2017 US: 9/29/2017
Jay Ramsey	Lonely Girl	Mad Men	404	TV	AMC	8/15/2010
Jay Ramsey	Lovin' Is a Full Time Job	The Deuce	101	TV	HBO	9/10/2017
Jay Ramsey	Don't Have to Answer to Nobody	SMILF	107	TV	Showtime	12/17/17
Jay Ramsey	Look Away Love	Darling	--	Film	Amazon Studios	4/1/2016

− Source:
