= We Can Make the Morning =

- One of sides of the US single picture sleeve

Single by Elvis Presley

from the album Elvis Now
- A-side: "Until It's Time for You to Go" (double A-side)
- Released: January 4, 1972
- Recorded: March 1971
- Studio: RCA's Studio B, Nashville
- Label: RCA Victor
- Songwriter: Jay Ramsey

Elvis Presley singles chronology
"Merry Christmas Baby" / "O Come, All Ye Faithful" (1971)	"Until It's Time for You to Go" / "We Can Make the Morning" (1972)	"He Touched Me" / "Bosom of Abraham" (1972)

"We Can Make the Morning" is a song written by Jay Ramsey and originally recorded and released by Elvis Presley.

It was released as a single (with "Until It's Time for You to Go" on the opposite side) on January 4, 1972, and included on the album Elvis Now dropped on February 20 of the same year.

Listed on the U.S. Billboard Easy Listening chart as a double A-side with "Until It's Time for You to Go", the song peaked at number 9 for the week of November 3, 1972.

== History ==
Elvis recorded the song during his March 1971 session at RCA's Studio B. The session featured James Burton and Chip Young on guitar, Norbert Putnam on bass, Jerry Carrigan and Kenneth Buttrey on drums. David Briggs on piano, Glen Spreen on organ, and Charlie McCoy on organ, harmonica and percussion.

== Track listing ==
7" single (RCA Victor 74-0619, 1972)
No.	Title	Writer(s)	Length
1.	"Until It's Time for You to Go"	Buffy Sainte-Marie	3:56
2.	"We Can Make the Morning"	Jay Ramsey	3:54

== Charts ==
Chart (1972)	Peak position
US Adult Contemporary (Billboard)	9
