= Elvis Rock (album) =

Compilation album by Elvis Presley
- Released: February 28, 2006
- Recorded: January 10, 1956 – June 10, 1958
- Genre: Rock and roll
- Length: 42:08
- Label: RCA-Sony BMG

Elvis Presley chronology
Elvis Inspirational (2006)	Elvis Rock (2006)	The Essential Elvis Presley (2007)

Elvis Rock, RCA's 2006 compilation—part of a six-set of six theme-based compilations that also includes Elvis Country, Elvis Movies, Elvis Inspirational, Elvis Live and Elvis R&B.

On January 12, 2018, the RIAA awarded the disc with a Gold Record, corresponding for US sales in excess of 500,000.

== Track listing ==
Track	Song Title	Writer(s)	Time
1.	Don't Be Cruel (2005 DSD Remaster)	Otis Blackwell, Elvis Presley	2:04
2.	Hound Dog	Jerry Leiber, Mike Stoller	2:18
3.	Blue Suede Shoes(2005 DSD Remaster)	Carl Perkins	2:00
4.	Tutti Frutti (2005 DSD Remastered)	Dorothy LaBostrie, Little Richard	1:59
5.	Heartbreak Hotel (2005 DSD Remastered)	Mae Boren Axton, Tommy Durden, Elvis Presley	2:09
6.	Jailhouse Rock	Jerry Leiber, Mike Stoller	2:36
7.	I Got Stung (New Sound Remastered)	Aaron Schroeder, David Hill	1:51
8.	A Big Hunk o' Love	Aaron Schroeder, Sidney Wyche	2:14
9.	Wear My Ring Around Your Neck (New Sound Remastered)	Bert Carroll, Russell Moody	2:16
10.	Hard Headed Woman ((from the Hal Wallis Production "King Creole", a Paramount picture))	Claude Demetrius	1:55
11.	King Creole (New Sound Remastered)	Jerry Leiber, Mike Stoller	2:09
12.	I Need Your Love Tonight (New Sound Remastered)	Bickley S. Reichmer, Sid Wayne	2:06
13.	Too Much (2005 DSD Remaster)	Bernard Weinman, Lee Rosenberg	2:33
14.	All Shook Up	Otis Blackwell, Elvis Presley	1:59
15.	Long Tall Sally (2005 DSD Remaster)	Otis Blackwell, Enotris Johnson Little Richard	1:54
16.	Rip It Up (2005 DSD Remaster)	John Marascalco	1:54
17.	Got A Lot O' Livin' To Do! (2005 DSD remaster)	Aaron Schroeder, Ben Weisman	2:33
18.	Party (2005 DSD remaster)	Jessie Mae Robinson	1:30
19.	Mean Woman Blues (2005 DSD remaster)	Claude Demetrius	2:19
20.	Dixieland Rock (Elvis Rock version)	Rachel Frank, Aaron Schroeder	1:49

== Credits ==
Name	Credits
Vic Anesini	Mastering
Mae Boren Axton	Composer
Otis Blackwell	Composer
Bert Carroll	Composer
Claude Demetrius	Composer
Joseph DiMuro	Executive Producer
Tommy Durden	Composer
Rachel Frank	Executive Producer
Erwin Gorostiza	Art Direction
Michael Hill	Liner Notes
Jack Hudson	A&R
Enotris Johnson	Composer
Ernst Mikael Jørgensen	Audio Production
Oscar Hammerstein II	Composer
Dorothy LaBostrie	Composer
Jerry Leiber	Composer
John Hudson	A&R
Jennifer Liebeskind	Project Coordinator
Little Richard	Composer
Jennifer Liebeskind	Project Coordinator
Iris Maenza	Project Director
John Marascalco	Composer
Little Richard	Composer
Elvis Presley	Composer
Bickley S. Reichmer	Composer
Jessie Mae Robinson	Composer
Rob Santos	Production Assistant
Aaron Schroeder	Composer
Jeffrey Schulz	Design
Roger Semon	Audio Production, Compilation Producer
Mike Stoller	Composer
Matthew Stringer	Project Director
Sid Wayne	Composer
Ben Weisman	Composer
Sidney Wyche	Composer
