= Until It's Time for You to Go =

1965 song by Buffy Sainte-Marie

Single by Buffy Sainte-Marie

from the album Many a Mile
- B-side: "The Flower and the Apple Tree"
- Released: 1965
- Label: Vanguard
- Songwriter: Buffy Sainte-Marie
- Producer: Maynard Solomon

"Until It's Time for You to Go"
- One of sides of the US single picture sleeve

Single by Elvis Presley

from the album Elvis Now
- A-side: "We Can Make the Morning" (double A-side)
- Released: January 4, 1972
- Recorded: May 16, 1971
- Studio: RCA Studio B, Nashville
- Genre: Pop
- Label: RCA Victor
- Songwriter: Buffy Sainte-Marie

Elvis Presley singles chronology
"Merry Christmas Baby" / "O Come, All Ye Faithful" (1971)	"Until It's Time for You to Go" / "We Can Make the Morning" (1972)	"He Touched Me" / "Bosom of Abraham" (1972)

"Until It's Time for You to Go" is a song from the 1965 album Many a Mile by American singer-songwriter Buffy Sainte-Marie. Sainte-Marie included a French-language reworking of the song, "T'es pas un autre", on her 1967 album Fire & Fleet & Candlelight. French translation was made by Quebecer songwriter Claude Gauthier.

The song has been recorded by many other singers.

== Background ==
The lyrics concern an ordinary man and woman who love each other, but cannot stay together because they come from different worlds. The singer asks their lover: "Don't ask why / Don't ask how / Don't ask forever / Love me now." According to Sainte-Marie, the song "popped into my head while I was falling in love with someone I knew couldn't stay with me."

== "The Flower and the Apple Tree" ==
Featured as a B-side to the Sainte-Marie's single release of "Until It's Time for You to Go" is the rarity "The Flower and the Apple Tree", an original song that was exclusive to the single.

== Notable cover versions ==
- It was a UK Top 20 hit for British group the Four Pennies in 1965.
- In 1969, Neil Diamond released a cover that went to No. 11 on the US Easy Listening chart and No. 53 on the US Hot 100 the following year. Record World said that "Neil Diamond has done a beautiful job" with the song. Billboard called it "one gem of a performance". Cash Box called it "a splendid reading with the velvet style polished by 'Holly' and 'Caroline.'"
- In 1972, Elvis Presley released the song, which peaked at No. 40 on the US Hot 100, and No. 9 on the US Easy Listening chart.
- In 1973, New Birth featuring future Supremes member Susaye Greene recorded a version of the song, which peaked at No. 21 on the US Hot Soul Singles chart.
