= John Gowans =

Scottish Salvationist and composer (1934–2012)

General John Gowans
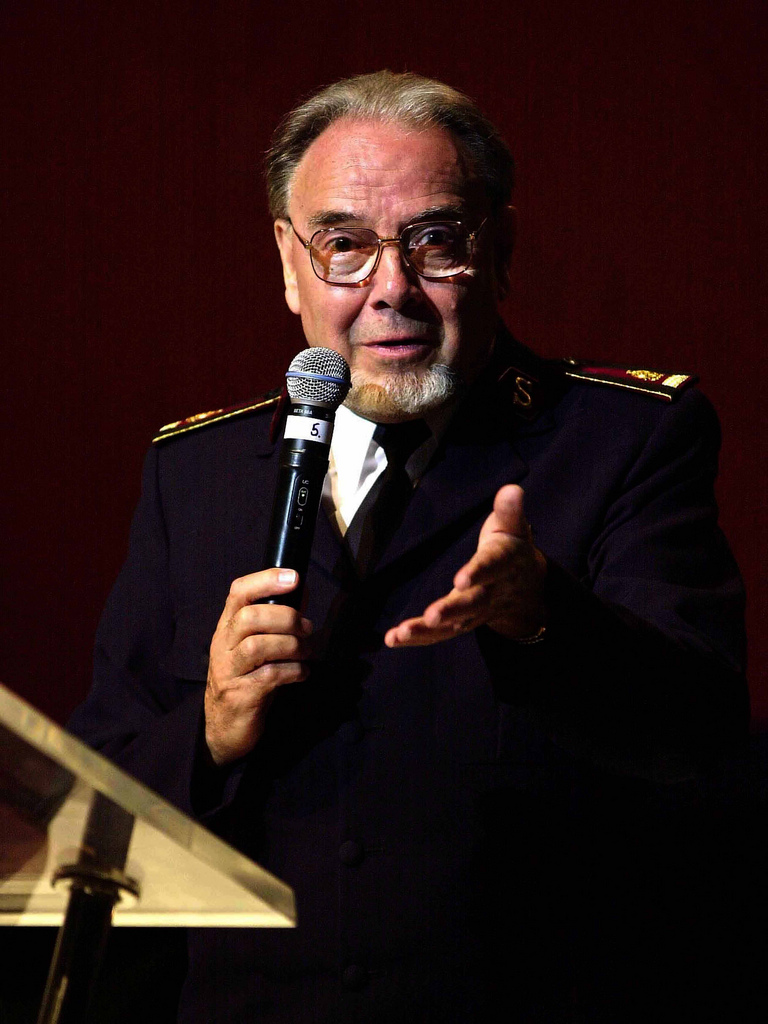

16th General of The Salvation Army
- In office 23 July 1999 – 13 November 2002
- Chief: John Larsson
- Preceded by: Paul Rader
- Succeeded by: John Larsson

Personal details
- Born: 13 November 1934 Blantyre, South Lanarkshire, Scotland
- Died: 8 December 2012 (aged 78) London, England

John Gowans (13 November 1934 – 8 December 2012) was a Scottish clergyman, who was the 16th General of The Salvation Army from 1999 to 2002, succeeding General Paul Rader. He is also notable for pairing with General John Larsson in the composition of many songs and musicals.

== Childhood ==
Gowans was born in Blantyre, South Lanarkshire, on 13 November 1934, the third of five children; his parents were Salvation Army officers.

At age 18, he undertook national service, with plans to train for the teaching profession. He eventually decided to join the British Army, where his first choice was the Army Catering Corps. However, the Army recommended he join the Royal Army Educational Corps. He then spent his two years of national service in Germany.

== Work in The Salvation Army ==
In 1954, Gowans entered the Salvation Army International Training College (Soulwinners Session). There he met his wife Gisèle Bonhotal who, herself, was a qualified children's nurse. She was French by birth and her parents, like Gowans', were both Salvation Army officers. The couple were married in Paris in 1957 and had two sons, John-Marc and Christophe.

Beginning in 1967 Gowans demonstrated his writing capacity when, with John Larsson, co-authored ten full-length stage musicals. These were Take-Over Bid (1967), Hosea (1969), Jesus Folk (1972), Spirit (1973), Glory (1975), White Rose (1977), The Blood of the Lamb (1978), Son of Man (1983), Man Mark II (1985), and The Meeting (1990).

He also wrote three books of prayer poems under the title of O Lord! and an autobiography, There's a Boy Here ...

Gowans and his wife served in various corps in the British Territory over a period of 16 years. He was then appointed national stewardship secretary, while his wife combined her role as organiser of the International Youth Fellowship with work in one of the Army's maternity homes in London.

After a period as divisional leaders in Manchester, UK, Gowans, then a lieutenant-colonel, became chief secretary of the France Territory. He was then appointed to Los Angeles in the USA Western Territory where he served as Secretary for Programme.

After serving as leaders of the Southern California Division the couple returned to France in 1986 as territorial leaders. Seven years later they were appointed territorial leaders of the Australia Eastern and Papua New Guinea Territory, which included responsibility for the work of the Army in New South Wales, Queensland, the Australian Capital Territory and Papua New Guinea.

In 1997, John Gowans was promoted to commissioner and took command of the United Kingdom Territory with the Republic of Ireland.

On 15 May 1999, Gowans was elected the 16th General of The Salvation Army and took office on 23 July 1999, with Commissioner Gisèle Gowans as World President of Women's Organisations.

When Gowans retired in 2002, his earlier musical partner John Larsson succeeded him as the next international leader of The Salvation Army.

== Death ==
Gowans died on 8 December 2012. His funeral service took place at the William Booth Memorial Buildings, Denmark Hill, London on Friday 14 December 2012.

Preceded by Paul Rader	General of The Salvation Army; 1999–2002	Succeeded by John Larsson
