= The Call (Anne Murray song) =

Single by Anne Murray

from the album Together
- B-side: "Lady Bug"
- Released: January 1976
- Genre: Country
- Length: 2:34
- Label: Capitol 4207
- Songwriter(s): Gene MacLellan
- Producer(s): Tom Catalano

Anne Murray singles chronology
"Sunday Sunrise" (1975)	"The Call" (1976)	"Golden Oldie" (1976)

"The Call" is a song written by Gene MacLellan. MacLellan originally released a version the song in 1970 that reached #15 on the Canadian Country chart and #91 on the Canadian Top Singles chart.

== Anne Murray recording ==
Anne Murray recorded her first version on her 1970 album, Honey, Wheat and Laughter. In 1975, she recorded a different version of the song, produced by Tom Catalano. The song reached #5 on the Canadian country chart, #6 on the U.S. Adult Contemporary chart, and #13 on the Canadian Adult Contemporary chart in 1976. The song appeared on her 1975 album, Together.

== Chart performance ==
=== Gene MacLellan ===
Chart (1970)	Peak position
Canadian RPM Country Tracks	15
Canadian RPM Top Singles	91

=== Anne Murray ===
Chart (1976)	Peak position
Canadian RPM Country Tracks	5
Canadian RPM Top Singles	52
Canadian RPM Adult Contemporary	13
US Hot Country Singles	19
Billboard Hot 100	91
US Adult Contemporary (Billboard)	6
