= The Essential Elvis Presley =

Greatest hits album by Elvis Presley
- Released: January 2, 2007
- Recorded: July 5, 1954 – February 4, 1976 at various locations
- Genres: Rock and roll; rockabilly; country; pop
- Labels: RCA; Legacy; Sony BMG
- Producers: Ernst Mikael Jorgensen; Roger Semon

Elvis Presley chronology
Elvis Rock (2006)	The Essential Elvis Presley (2007)	Elvis the King (2007)

The Essential Elvis Presley is a greatest hits collection by American musician Elvis Presley. The album was released as a two-disc set on January 2, 2007, by RCA Records as a part of Sony BMG's The Essential series and was later released by RCA and Legacy Recordings as a Limited Edition 3.0 three-disc set.

In the Netherlands the album was released as The Dutch Collection, which topped the albums chart in that country, while The Essential Elvis Presley topped the albums chart in Sweden. Although not as successful as other releases in The Essential series, the album was certified in several countries, including a Platinum certification in the US.

== 2007 CD track listing ==
=== Disc 1 ===
1. "That's All Right"
2. "Baby, Let's Play House"
3. "Mystery Train"
4. "Heartbreak Hotel"
5. "I Was the One"
6. "Blue Suede Shoes"
7. "Hound Dog"
8. "Don't Be Cruel"
9. "Love Me Tender"
10. "All Shook Up"
11. "(There'll Be) Peace in the Valley (For Me)"
12. "Jailhouse Rock"
13. "Trouble"
14. "Fever"
15. "It's Now or Never"
16. "Reconsider Baby"
17. "Are You Lonesome Tonight?"
18. "Little Sister"
19. "Follow That Dream"
20. "Can't Help Falling in Love"

=== Disc 2 ===
1. "Return to Sender"
2. "Devil in Disguise"
3. "Viva Las Vegas"
4. "Bossa Nova Baby"
5. "Big Boss Man"
6. "A Little Less Conversation"
7. "If I Can Dream"
8. "Memories"
9. "In the Ghetto"
10. "Suspicious Minds"
11. "Don't Cry Daddy"
12. "Kentucky Rain"
13. "Polk Salad Annie"
14. "The Wonder of You"
15. "I Just Can't Help Believin'"
16. "Burning Love"
17. "Always on My Mind"
18. "Steamroller Blues"
19. "Hurt"
20. "Moody Blue"

== 2008 Limited Edition 3.0 CD track listing ==
Discs 1 & 2 same as above

=== Disc 3 ===
1. Good Rockin' Tonight
2. (Let Me Be Your) Teddy Bear
3. King Creole
4. Such A Night
5. I Feel So Bad
6. Guitar Man
7. Only The Strong Survive
8. "You Don't Have to Say You Love Me"

== 2015 vinyl LP track listing ==
=== Disc 1 ===
Side A

1. "That's All Right"
2. "Baby, Let's Play House"
3. "Mystery Train"
4. "Heartbreak Hotel"
5. "I Was the One"
6. "Blue Suede Shoes"
7. "Hound Dog"
8. "Don't Be Cruel"
9. "Love Me Tender"

Side B

1. "All Shook Up"
2. "Jailhouse Rock"
3. "Trouble"
4. "It's Now or Never"
5. "Are You Lonesome Tonight?"
6. "Little Sister"
7. "Follow That Dream"

=== Disc 2 ===
Side C

1. "Can't Help Falling in Love"
2. "Return to Sender"
3. "Devil in Disguise"
4. "Bossa Nova Baby"
5. "Viva Las Vegas"
6. "A Little Less Conversation"
7. "If I Can Dream"

Side D

1. "In the Ghetto"
2. "Suspicious Minds"
3. "Don't Cry Daddy"
4. "Kentucky Rain"
5. "Burning Love"

== Charts ==
=== Weekly charts ===
Chart (2007–2021)	Peak position
Australian Albums (ARIA)	33
Belgian Albums (Ultratop Flanders)	2
Belgian Albums (Ultratop Wallonia)	2
Danish Albums (Hitlisten)	40
Dutch Albums (Album Top 100) The Dutch Collection	1
Finnish Albums (Suomen virallinen lista)	11
French Albums (SNEP)	172
Mexican Albums (AMPROFON)	92
Norwegian Albums (VG-lista)	35
Spanish Albums (Promusicae)	98
Swedish Albums (Sverigetopplistan)	1
Swiss Albums (Schweizer Hitparade)	15
US Billboard 200	42
US Top Country Albums (Billboard)	8
US Top Rock Albums (Billboard)	14

=== Year-end charts ===
Chart (2007)	Position
Belgian Albums (Ultratop Wallonia)	59
Dutch Albums (Album Top 100) The Dutch Collection	70
Swedish Albums (Sverigetopplistan)	17
Chart (2019)	Position
US Top Country Albums (Billboard)	42
US Top Rock Albums (Billboard)	57
Chart (2020)	Position
US Billboard 200	141
US Top Country Albums (Billboard)	14
US Top Rock Albums (Billboard)	15
Chart (2021)	Position
US Top Country Albums (Billboard)	49
US Top Rock Albums (Billboard)	45
Chart (2022)	Position
US Top Country Albums (Billboard)	66
Chart (2025)	Position
US Top Country Albums (Billboard)	68

== Certifications ==
Region	Certification	Certified units/sales
Australia (ARIA)	2× Platinum	140,000^{‡}
Belgium (BRMA)	Gold	25,000^{*}
Sweden (GLF)	Gold	20,000^{^}
United Kingdom (BPI)	Silver	60,000^{‡}
United States (RIAA)	Platinum	500,000^{‡}
^{*} Sales figures based on certification alone.^{^} Shipments figures based on certification alone.^{‡} Sales+streaming figures based on certification alone.
