= Love Letters from Elvis =

Studio album by Elvis Presley
- Released: June 16, 1971
- Recorded: June 4–9, 1970
- Genre: Soft rock; pop; country; gospel
- Length: 32:40
- Label: RCA Victor
- Producer: Felton Jarvis

Elvis Presley chronology
You'll Never Walk Alone (1971)	Love Letters from Elvis (1971)	C'mon Everybody (1971)

Singles from Love Letters from Elvis
- 1. "Life" / "Only Believe" Released: May 25, 1971

Professional ratings
Review scores
Source	Rating
AllMusic	3.5/5 stars
Billboard	Favorable
MusicHound	2.5/5 stars
Rough Guides	1/5 stars

Love Letters from Elvis is the fourteenth studio album by American singer and musician Elvis Presley, released in 1971. The album was critically panned upon release, and failed to crack the top 20 of the Billboard album charts, but did reach No. 12 on the US Top Country Albums chart and No. 7 on the UK best-selling albums chart.

== Content ==
The album was made up of leftovers from Elvis' marathon June 1970 recording sessions in Nashville. Most of the other 35 songs recorded during those sessions had been used in Elvis' 1970 albums That's the Way It Is and Elvis Country (I'm 10,000 Years Old). Wanting to squeeze out a third album from the sessions, RCA records had producer Felton Jarvis mix, overdub, and compile the remaining songs.

The song's title track was a rare instance of Presley re-recording a past hit in the studio, his original version of "Love Letters" having been released as a single in 1966. "Got My Mojo Working" is edited down from an impromptu jam session; Presley's version incorporates lyrics from "Hands Off", a 1955 song by Frankie Castro released on the Wing record label (RCA often mislabelled this song "Keep Your Hands Off of It" when the complete jam was issued on CD years later).

Three songs from this album were released on singles. The single "Life" / "Only Believe" was released in March 1971 and reached only No. 53 on the US Billboard Singles chart. It was Elvis's lowest chart position for a single since "Almost in Love" had reached No. 95 in late 1968. "Heart of Rome" was placed on the B-side of the non-album track "I'm Leavin'" released as a single in August 1971. It reached No. 23 in the UK and No. 83 in Australia.

== Track listing ==
=== Original release ===
Love Letters from Elvis – Side one
No.	Title	Writer(s)	Recording date	Length
1.	"Love Letters"	Edward Heyman and Victor Young	June 7, 1970	2:53
2.	"When I'm Over You"	Shirl Milete	June 7, 1970	2:28
3.	"If I Were You"	Gerald Nelson	June 8, 1970	3:01
4.	"Got My Mojo Working"	Preston Foster	June 5, 1970	4:36
5.	"Heart of Rome"	Alan Blaikley, Ken Howard, Geoff Stephens	June 6, 1970	2:56

Side two
No.	Title	Writer(s)	Recording date	Length
1.	"Only Believe"	D. Paul Rader	June 8, 1970	2:49
2.	"This Is Our Dance"	Les Reed, Geoff Stephens	June 6, 1970	3:16
3.	"Cindy, Cindy"	Fred Wise, Buddy Kaye, Dolores Fuller, Ben Weisman	June 4, 1970	2:33
4.	"I'll Never Know"	Fred Karger, Sid Wayne, Ben Weisman	June 5, 1970	2:25
5.	"It Ain't No Big Thing (But It's Growing)"	Shorty Hall, Neal Merritt, Alice Joy Merritt	June 6, 1970	2:49
6.	"Life"	Shirl Milete	June 6, 1970	3:10

=== Follow That Dream reissue ===
Disc 1 Original album (tracks 1–11); new bonus songs (tracks 12–15); first takes (tracks 16–22)
No.	Title	Length
1.	"Love Letters"
2.	"When I'm Over You"
3.	"If I Were You"
4.	"Got My Mojo Working" / "Keep Your Hands Off of It"
5.	"Heart of Rome"
6.	"Only Believe"
7.	"This Is Our Dance"
8.	"Cindy, Cindy"
9.	"I’ll Never Know"
10.	"It Ain’t No Big Thing (But It’s Growing)"
11.	"Life"
12.	"The Sound of Your Cry"
13.	"Sylvia"
14.	"Rags to Riches"
15.	"Something"
16.	"The Sound of Your Cry" (takes 1, 2, 3)
17.	"Cindy, Cindy" (take 1)
18.	"I’ll Never Know" (take 1)
19.	"It Ain’t No Big Thing (But It’s Growing)" (takes 1, 2)
20.	"Life" (take 1, 2)
21.	"Heart of Rome" (take 1)
22.	"If I Were You" (take 1)
23.	"Rags to Riches" (rehearsal, take 2)

Disc 2 Session outtakes and undubbed masters
No.	Title	Length
1.	"Radio Commercial"
2.	"The Sound of Your Cry" (takes 4, 5, 6)
3.	"Cindy, Cindy" (takes 2, 3; undubbed master)
4.	"Got My Mojo Working" / "Keep Your Hands Off Of It" (take 1; undubbed master)
5.	"I'll Never Know" (takes 2, 3)
6.	"It Ain't No Big Thing (But It’s Growing)" (takes 3, 4, 5, 6)
7.	"This Is Our Dance" (takes 6, 7, 9,11; undubbed master)
8.	"Life" (take10)
9.	"Heart of Rome" (take 2; undubbed master)
10.	"Love Letters" (takes 3, 1)
11.	"If I Were You" (takes 2, 3, 4, 5)
12.	"Only Believe" (takes 1, 2, 3, 4; undubbed master)
13.	"Sylvia" (takes 1, 2, 3, 4, 9)
14.	"Rags to Riches" (take 3)

== Personnel ==
- Elvis Presley – lead vocals, acoustic rhythm guitar
- James Burton – lead guitar
- Chip Young – rhythm guitar
- Charlie Hodge – harmony vocals on “Heart of Rome” and “This Is Our Dance”, acoustic rhythm guitar
- Norbert Putnam – bass
- David Briggs – piano
- Jerry Carrigan – drums
- Charlie McCoy – harmonica, vibraphone, organ
- The Imperials Quartet – backing vocals
- The Jordanaires – backing vocals on "When I'm Over You"
- The Nashville Edition – backing vocals on "It Ain't No Big Thing (But It's Growing)"
