= This Way Is My Way =

Studio album by Anne Murray
- Released: Fall 1969
- Recorded: August 1969
- Genre: Country
- Length: 30:17
- Label: Capitol
- Producer: Brian Ahern

Anne Murray chronology
What About Me (1968)	This Way Is My Way (1969)	Honey, Wheat and Laughter (1970)

Singles from This Way Is My Way
- 1. "Snowbird" Released: June 1970

This Way Is My Way is the second studio album by Canadian country pop artist Anne Murray and was released in 1969 on Capitol Records. Initially the album was available only in Canada. It was later made available in the U.S after Murray's chart success there in the 1970s. The album included recordings of songs by Eric Andersen, Gene MacLellan, and Bob Dylan.

A single release of "Snowbird" was issued in the U.S. in 1970, where it reached No. 8 in the Billboard Top 10 and started Murray's career there. The album peaked at No.13 on the Canadian RPM album chart on 20 February 1971.

Buddy Cage plays pedal steel guitar on this album. He went on to join the New Riders of the Purple Sage. The album cover features Murray sitting at the base of Albion Falls in Hamilton, Ontario.

== Track listing ==
No.	Title	Writer(s)	Length
1.	"Bidin' My Time"	Gene MacLellan	2:32
2.	"Sittin' Back Lovin' You"	John Sebastian	1:56
3.	"No One Is to Blame"	Steve Rhymer	4:19
4.	"I Wonder How the Old Folks Are at Home"	Anne Bybee	1:40
5.	"Sunspots"	Arthur Gee	2:41
6.	"He May Call"	Mike Brown, Steve Martin	2:09
7.	"Thirsty Boots"	Eric Andersen	3:25
8.	"Snowbird"	MacLellan	2:08
9.	"Hard as I Try"	MacLellan	2:25
10.	"I'll Be Your Baby Tonight"	Bob Dylan	2:50
11.	"Nice to Be with You"	Jerry Goldstein	3:51

== Personnel ==
- Anne Murray – vocals
- Brian Browne – keyboards
- Pat Riccio Jr. – keyboards
- Eric Robertson – keyboards
- Amos Garrett – guitars
- Brian Ahern – guitars
- Buddy Cage – pedal steel guitar
- Maurice Beaulieu – banjo, mandolin
- Skip Beckworth – bass
- Mike Burbey – bass
- Tommy Graham – percussion
- John Pace – percussion
- Ron Rully – percussion
- Rick Wilkins – brass and string arrangements

=== Production ===
- Paul White – executive producer, sleeve notes
- Brian Ahern – producer, arrangements
- Gary Starr – engineer

Reference source: Re-release of the original This is My Way album in a remastered CD series of Anne Murray albums originally released in long playing vinyl record form. This is My Way was Murray's first album for Capitol Records. EMI Canada 72434 35467 2 9
