= Original Casuals =

The Original Casuals, first known as The Casuals, were an American doo-wop trio from Dallas, Texas, United States. They had a charting hit with their version of "So Tough" in 1958. The Kuf-Linx also charted with their version of the song in 1958. In Canada the 2 versions co-charted at number 18 on March 10 and 17, 1958. The group included lead singer (Fred) Gary Mears, Paul Kearney and Jay Joe Adams and recorded with Back Beat Records of Houston. Paul Kearney accidentally shot himself fatally in 1960.

== Discography ==
- "So Tough" / "I Love My Darling" (1957)
- "Ju-Judy" / "Don't Pass Me By" (1958)
- "Three Kisses Past Midnight" / "It's Been A Long Time Girl" (1958)
