= Lee Denson =

American rockabilly musician

- Also known as: Jesse James
- Born: Jesse Lee Denson; August 25, 1932; Rienzi, Alcorn County, Mississippi, United States
- Died: November 6, 2007 (aged 75) Memphis, Shelby County, Tennessee, United states
- Genres: Rockabilly, pop
- Occupations: Singer, songwriter
- Instruments: Vocals, guitar
- Years active: 1956–1965

Jesse Lee Denson (August 25, 1932 – November 6, 2007) was an American rockabilly singer and songwriter. His songs have been recorded by Elvis Presley, Billy Williams, and the Kuf-Linx.

== Biography ==
Denson was born in Rienzi, Mississippi, but grew up in Memphis, Tennessee, where his family relocated when he was a baby. His father, Jesse James Denson, later ran a Pentecostal mission church in Memphis. As a child, Denson became friends with Johnny and Dorsey Burnette. After the Presley family moved to Memphis in 1948 and started attending the Pentecostal church on Poplar Street run by his father, he also became friendly with Elvis Presley, two years his junior, and reputedly taught him to play guitar.

In 1953 Denson moved to Key West, Florida, where he worked as a bellboy, Denson began singing in clubs in the style of Eddy Arnold. After seeing his friends Johnny and Dorsey Burnette on television, he moved to New York City to develop a music career, eventually gaining a recording contract with the Vik label, a subsidiary of RCA Records. His recordings included "Climb Love Mountain" (1957, Vik). The b-side of the single was "New Shoes", which featured guitar work by Eddie Cochran, who Denson had met while on tour in California. The Kuf-Linx recorded a version of "Climb Love Mountain", re-titled as "Climb Love's Mountain". Another of Denson's songs, "The Pied Piper", was a No. 50 US hit for Billy Williams in 1957.

Denson made several appearances on Dick Clark's Bandstand, before moving to California where he made recordings for Kent Records in 1958, credited as Jesse James. These included "The South's Gonna Rise Again", recorded with top musicians including Earl Palmer at Gold Star Studios. Denson also recorded for the Merri label in 1960. Although most of his recordings were rock and roll, he retained an interest in gospel music, and wrote "Miracle of the Rosary", based on the hymn "Ave Maria", offering the song to Presley when the two met. Presley later recorded the composition, and it appeared on the 1972 album, Elvis Now. Despite his Pentecostal background, in 1964 Denson became a Catholic, the faith of his wife Mary, which strongly influenced this composition. They both became active in the Catholic apostolate known as the Blue Army of Our Lady of Fatima, even leading some pilgrimages to the Portuguese Marian shrine.

In 1964, Denson recorded for the Magic Lamp label set up by Dorsey Burnette and Joe Osborn; the Carpenters made their first recordings as backing singers on the records. He returned to Memphis in 1972, and signed a contract with Stax Records. He later wrote and recorded several albums of Christian music for his own Eternal Rainbow label, as well as recording children's songs.

A compilation album of Denson's work was released in April 2002 on Hydra Records. The South's Gonna Rise Again contained 23 tracks, the majority written by Denson.

Denson died in Memphis, Tennessee, in November 2007 at the age of 75.
