= The Kuf-Linx =

1950s American rock and roll group

The Kuf-Linx were an American rock and roll vocal group, active in the 1950s. Other groups used similar names at the same time, and even recorded some of the same songs, causing some confusion. Band members included John Jennings (lead tenor), Johnny Woodson (tenor), Gaines Steele (tenor), George "Biggy" McFadden (bass), Leo Z. Manley, Darrell Johnson, and Gwen Johnson. Jennings and McFadden had been in the Jubalaires together.

== History ==
John Jennings was lead singer of the group. They signed to Challenge Records and recorded several songs including "So Tough" with backup band The Champs who recorded pop hit "Tequila" at the same recording session. The Kuf-Linx disbanded in 1958, and later some of the members went on to other bands including The Champs.

The Kuf-Linx version of the song "So Tough" was released soon after another version of the song was released by The Casuals (later renamed Original Casuals). The song versions duked it out on the charts. On March 17, 1958, Billboard listed "So Tough" as tied for Number 76 on "Top 100 Sides for Survey Week Ending March 8". In Canada the 2 versions co-charted at number 18 on March 10 and 17, 1958.

== Discography ==
- "So Tough" / "What'cha Gonna Do"
- "Climb Love's Mountain", a version of Lee Denson's "Climb Love Mountain"
