= The Sound of Your Cry =

Single by Elvis Presley
- A-side: "It's Only Love" "The Sound of Your Cry"
- Released: 1971
- Recorded: June 4, 1970
- Studio: RCA's Studio B, Nashville
- Genre: Soft rock
- Length: 3:11
- Label: RCA Victor
- Songwriters: Bernie Baum; Bill Giant; Florence Kaye

Elvis Presley singles chronology
"I'm Leavin'" / "Heart of Rome" (1971)	"It's Only Love" / "The Sound of Your Cry" (1971)	"Merry Christmas Baby" / "O Come, All Ye Faithful" (1971)

"The Sound of Your Cry" is a song written by Bernie Baum, Bill Giant and Florence Kaye and originally recorded and released by Elvis Presley.

It reached number 19 on the Billboard Easy Listening chart in 1971 (as a double A-side with "It's Only Love").

== Composition ==
The song was written by Bernie Baum, Bill Giant and Florence Kaye.

== Recording ==
Presley recorded the song on June 4, 1970, at RCA's Studio B in Nashville.

== Track listing ==
7" single (RCA Victor 48-1017, 1971)
No.	Title	Writer(s)	Length
1.	"It's Only Love"	Mark James, Steve Tyrell	2:37
2.	"The Sound of Your Cry"	Bernie Baum, Bill Giant, Florence Kaye	3:11

== Charts ==
Chart (1971)	Peak position
US Adult Contemporary (Billboard)	19
Chart (1982)	Peak position
UK Singles (Official Charts)	59
