= Paul Rader =

15th General of The Salvation Army

General Dr. Paul A. Rader

15th General of The Salvation Army
- In office July 23, 1994 – July 23, 1999
- Chief: Earle Maxwell
- Preceded by: Bramwell Tillsley
- Succeeded by: John Gowans

Personal details
- Born: March 14, 1934 New York City, U.S.
- Died: January 18, 2025 (aged 90) Lexington, Kentucky, U.S.
- Spouse: Commissioner Dr. Kay F. Rader
- Education: Asbury University; Asbury Theological Seminary; Southern Baptist Theological Seminary; Fuller Seminary

Paul Alexander Rader (March 14, 1934 – January 18, 2025), was an American religious leader, who was the 15th General of the Salvation Army from 1994 to 1999, and was the President of Asbury University in Wilmore, Kentucky, from 2000 to 2006.

== Biography ==
Born in New York City in 1934, Rader spent his undergraduate years at Asbury University, then studied at the Asbury Theological Seminary and the Southern Baptist Theological Seminary, graduating with BA, BD and MTh degrees.

At Asbury, he met and married his wife, Kay, who upon graduating with a BA degree, qualified as a teacher. Together, they entered the Salvation Army School for Officers Training in New York in September 1960 and were commissioned a year later.

Lieutenant Rader and his wife temporarily assisted at Newark, New Jersey Central Corps, while learning the Korean language with the intention to serve as missionaries there. They arrived in Seoul, Korea, in January 1962 to serve on the staff of the Officer Training College. After five years, Captain Rader was appointed vice-principal.

They returned to America for two years in 1971 where Rader, now a captain and then a major, was assigned to Southern California Divisional Headquarters and his wife to Pasadena Corps, in California. While in California, Rader studied at Fuller Seminary, earning his doctorate in Missiology. In August 1973, they again returned to Korea, to serve first as training principal, then later as Territorial Education Secretary. In October 1977, Major Rader was appointed chief secretary and promoted to the rank of lieutenant-colonel. In February 1984, Rader returned to the United States after 22 years of service to serve as principal of the School for Officers' Training in Suffern, New York. He then was awarded a Doctor of Laws (LLD) degree from Asbury.

In January 1989, Colonel Rader was appointed chief secretary of the USA Eastern Territory, and in October 1989 was promoted to the rank of commissioner and became leader of the USA Western Territory. Then in 1994 he was elected general of The Salvation Army where he served until 1999.

He served as president of Asbury University from 2000 through 2006 and was Asbury's 15th president. Rader retired as president in 2006.

Rader was the great-nephew of evangelist Paul Rader.

== Death ==
Rader died on January 18, 2025.

Preceded by Bramwell Tillsley	General of The Salvation Army; 1994–1999	Succeeded by John Gowans
