= Sylvia (Elvis Presley song) =

Single by Elvis Presley

from the album Elvis Now
- A-side: "Sylvia"
- B-side: "Put Your Hand in the Hand"
- Released: 1972 (Brazil)
- Recorded: June 8, 1970
- Length: 3:16
- Label: RCA Victor
- Songwriter(s): Geoff Stephens; Les Reed

Audio
- "Sylvia" on YouTube

"Sylvia" is a song by Elvis Presley from his 1972 album Elvis Now, being the penultimate song recorded on the last day of the prolific Nashville recording sessions in June 1970 (which yielded a total of more than 30 songs, spread over several albums).

For some reason RCA Victor (possibly considering it as a single candidate) did not include the song either on That’s The Way It Is album in 1970 or on Love Letters from Elvis album in 1971, though it was recorded during the same sessions and was thematically appropriate for both these albums. It eventually appeared on Elvis Now in 1972. However, the 2008 FTD re-release of Love Letters from Elvis contained the master version of the track (known as Take 8) as well as all its outtakes.

Another version of the song, recorded on July 15, 1970, at MGM Studios during the rehearsals for the MGM documentary That's the Way It Is, and available on several bootlegs, suggests Presley's willingness to revive the song for the upcoming Las Vegas concerts. He can be heard vocalizing to the TCB Band, expecting it to accompany his vocals. However, the lackluster response from the musicians (or their unfamiliarity with the material) caused him to abandon the idea.

In 1972, the song reached the top of the charts in Brazil.

== Writing and recording ==
It was written by Geoff Stephens and Les Reed. Presley recorded it on June 8, 1970, at RCA Studio B in Nashville, Tennessee.

== Track listings ==
7" single (Brazil, 1972)

A. "Sylvia" (3:16)
B. "Put Your Hand in the Hand" (3:15)
