= He Touched Me (song) =

Song by Bill Gaither

Single by Elvis Presley
- B-side: "Bosom of Abraham"
- Released: February 29, 1972
- Recorded: May 18, 1971
- Studio: RCA Studio B, Nashville
- Genre: Gospel
- Label: RCA Victor
- Songwriter: William Gaither

Elvis Presley singles chronology
"Until It's Time for You to Go" / "We Can Make the Morning" (1972)	"He Touched Me" / "Bosom of Abraham" (1972)	"An American Trilogy" / "The First Time Ever I Saw Your Face" (1972)

"He Touched Me" is a gospel song written by Bill Gaither in 1963.

== History ==
While Bill Gaither was accompanying Dr. Dale Oldham on his evangelistic crusades, the preacher said to him, "Bill, the word 'touch' is a very popular word. It comes up so often in the New Testament stories about Jesus touching people's eyes and healing them, or touching people's lives and changing them. It's a special, spiritual word and you ought to write a song that praises His touch." So Gaither did. That week, Dr. Oldham's son Doug Oldham began singing it in the meetings. Doug was also the first to record the song (in 1964). Not long after that, the Bill Gaither Trio recorded it.

In 1965, the Imperials first recorded "He Touched Me" for their album The Happy Sounds of Jake Hess and the Imperials, then recorded a newer version in 1969 for the album Love Is The Thing. It was this version that Elvis Presley heard, and made him want to record it himself. On May 5, 1971, Elvis recorded it—along with the Imperials (as backup singers)—and was released as a single. It became the title track of his 1972 Grammy Award-winning album He Touched Me.

== Other notable recorded versions ==
- 1967: The Blackwood Brothers on the album With a Song on My Lips and a Prayer in My Heart
- 1967: Jimmy Durante on Songs for Sunday
- 1968: Cathedral Quartet on I Saw the Light
- 1968: J. D. Sumner and the Stamps Quartet on Music, Music, Music
- 1968: George Beverly Shea on Whispering Hope
- 1968: The Statesmen Quartet on Standing on the Promises
- 1970: Del Delker on He Touched Me
- 1971: Connie Smith on Come Along and Walk with Me
- 1977: Tennessee Ernie Ford on He Touched Me
- 1984: Johnny Cash on I Believe (recorded in 1979)
- 1997: The Jordanaires on Sing Elvis' Favorite Gospel Songs
- 1999: Lawrence Welk, featuring Tom Netherton on Songs of Faith (also Netherton performed the song on the Welk's weekly show)
- 1999: Bill Gaither's singing group, the Gaither Vocal Band on God Is Good
- 2013: Steven Curtis Chapman on Deep Roots
- 2014: Planetshakers on "This Is Our Time"
