= It's Only Love (B. J. Thomas song) =

1969 song

Single by B. J. Thomas

from the album Young and In Love
- B-side: "You Don't Love Me Anymore ("The Train Song")"
- Released: March 1969
- Genre: Pop, Easy Listening
- Label: Scepter
- Songwriters: Mark James; Steve Tyrell

B. J. Thomas singles chronology
"Hooked on a Feeling" (1968)	"It's Only Love" (1969)	"Pass the Apple Eve" (1969)

"It's Only Love'" is a 1969 song by B. J. Thomas from his LP Young and In Love. Elvis Presley made the song a top hit in the UK, reaching No. 3 in 1980.

Thomas' original of "It's Only Love" was released in the spring of 1969. It became a modest hit in the United States: Billboard No. 45, Cash Box No. 28 and AC No. 19, while peaking at No. 24 in Canada.

== Elvis Presley cover ==
"It's Only Love"

Single by Elvis Presley
- B-side: "The Sound of Your Cry" (U.S.) "Beyond the Reef" (UK)
- Released: September 21, 1971
- Recorded: May 20, 1971
- Studio: RCA Studio B, Nashville
- Genre: Rock, easy listening
- Label: RCA Victor
- Songwriters: Mark James; Steve Tyrell

Elvis Presley singles chronology
"I'm Leavin'" / "Heart of Rome" (1971)	"It's Only Love" / "The Sound of Your Cry" (1971)	"Merry Christmas Baby" / "O Come, All Ye Faithful" (1971)

"It's Only Love" was covered two and a half years later by Elvis Presley in the fall of 1971, and released as a single along with "The Sound of Your Cry" on the B-side. Accompanying vocals were provided by the Imperials.

According to the Elvis Presley official website: "Another double-ballad selection, another Elvis pick, another sales dud. 'It's Only Love' was a legitimate listener-friendly stab at the pop market (by Mark James, author of 'Suspicious Minds'), and Elvis put real effort into it. But it sold no more than 1968’s 'A Little Less Conversation', the previous low for a regular-issue Elvis single."

In the United States, "It's Only Love" reached No. 51 on the Billboard Hot 100 for the week of November 6, 1971. It also charted on the Billboard Easy Listening chart.

In 1980, it was released in some countries as a single with "Beyond the Reef" on the B-side. In the UK Singles Chart the single charted as "It's Only Love / Beyond the Reef" (double-A-sided), peaking at No. 3 on the week of August 30, 1980. As of August 2017, the single "It's Only Love" / "Beyond The Reef" is Presley's nineteenth most selling single in the UK.

Also the song "It's Only Love" was included in the 1980 box set Elvis Aron Presley (on the record 8 titled "Lost Singles").

== Charts ==
B. J. Thomas

Chart (1969)	Peak position
Canada RPM Top Singles	24
U.S. Billboard Hot 100	45
U.S. Billboard Easy Listening	37
U.S. Cash Box Top 100	28

Elvis Presley

Chart (1971)	Peak position
Canada RPM Top Singles	46
U.S. Billboard Hot 100	51
U.S. Billboard Easy Listening	19
U.S. Cash Box Top 100	51
Chart (1980)	Peak position
UK (Official Charts Company)	3

== Certifications ==
Elvis Presley version

Region	Certification	Certified units/sales
United Kingdom (BPI)	Silver	250,000^{^}
^{^} Shipments figures based on certification alone.
