= Where Did They Go, Lord? =

Song by Elvis Presley
- B-side: "Rags to Riches"
- Released: February 23, 1971
- Genre: Easy listening
- Length: 2:25
- Label: RCA Victor
- Songwriters: Dallas Frazier, A.L. "Doodle" Owens

Where Did They Go, Lord? is a song by Elvis Presley. It was recorded on September 22, 1970, and adapted from Dallas Frazier's original version. It first appeared on a 1971 single as the B-side to Elvis' recording of "Rags to Riches" (RCA Victor 47–9980). It was first released on LP on the 1978 compilation album He Walks Beside Me.
