= Only Believe (song) =

Single by Elvis Presley

from the album Love Letters from Elvis
- A-side: "Life"
- Released: April 27, 1971
- Recorded: June 8, 1970
- Studio: RCA Studio B Nashville
- Genre: Gospel
- Length: 2:47
- Label: RCA Victor
- Songwriter(s): Paul Rader

Elvis Presley singles chronology
| "Rags to Riches" (1972) | "Only Believe" / "Life" (1971) | "I'm Leavin'" (1971) |

Professional ratings
Review scores
| Source | Rating |
|---|---|
| Billboard | Favorable |

"Only Believe" is a song written by evangelist Paul Rader.

Elvis Presley released it in 1971 as a two-sided single with the song "Life" on the reverse side. Both songs were from the upcoming album Love Letters from Elvis.

On Billboard Hot 100 the single charted as "Life / Only Believe", peaking at number 53.

== Critical response ==
Billboard reviewed the single "Only Believe / Life" in its May 8, 1971 issue. The magazine characterizes the song "Life" as "a gospel oriented ballad that builds into a heavy production."

== Charts ==
| Chart (1971) | Peak position |
|---|---|
| US Billboard Hot 100 | 53* |

^{*} as "Life / Only Believe"
