= You'll Never Walk Alone (Elvis Presley album) =

- CD reissue cover

Compilation album by Elvis Presley
- Released: March 22, 1971
- Recorded: January 12, 1957 – March 6, 1969
- Genre: Gospel
- Length: 29:13
- Label: RCA Camden

Elvis Presley chronology
Elvis Country (I'm 10,000 Years Old) (1971)	You'll Never Walk Alone (1971)	Love Letters from Elvis (1971)

Professional ratings
Review scores
Source	Rating
AllMusic	3/5 stars
MusicHound	2.5/5 stars

You'll Never Walk Alone is a compilation album by American singer and musician Elvis Presley, released in 1971 by RCA Records on the RCA Camden budget label. The album contains primarily previously released gospel recordings by Presley dating back as far as 1957, plus two unissued tracks. The album reached number 69 on the Billboard 200 chart and number 20 on the UK Albums Chart.

In the mid-1970s, RCA Records leased the rights to reissue certain recordings by Presley and other RCA Victor artists on the Camden label to the budget reissue label Pickwick Records. You'll Never Walk Alone was reissued by Pickwick with its original RCA cover art. Following Presley's unexpected death in August, 1977, demand for his recordings increased dramatically and RCA soon reclaimed the rights to their Camden/Pickwick recordings. You'll Never Walk Alone was first reissued on compact disc in 1987 in the "RCA Camden Classics" series. RCA reissued the album on CD a second time in 2006 along with most of Elvis' other RCA Camden budget albums. The album was certified Gold on March 27, 1992, Platinum on July 15, 1999, and 3× Platinum on January 6, 2004, by the Recording Industry Association of America.

== Content ==
The single "You'll Never Walk Alone", an adaptation of the Oscar Hammerstein II and Richard Rodgers standard, was a minor hit for him in the late 1960s. Although technically a secular show tune, Elvis and RCA treated it as a religious song, as reflected in the original 1967 single and the fact it was often included on compilations of Presley's religious music, such as this album.

Two previously unissued recordings are included: "Let Us Pray" from the soundtrack of Presley's 1969 film, Change of Habit and "Who Am I?", a leftover from the early-1969 recording sessions that produced his album From Elvis in Memphis. The title track, and its original single flipside, "We Call on Him", made their vinyl album debut with this release.

The album was released shortly before the RCA Camden reissue of Elvis' Christmas Album. You'll Never Walk Alone contains the four gospel recordings from the original 1957 RCA Victor release of the Christmas album, which were omitted from the RCA Camden reissue. The four gospel songs first appeared in 1957 on an RCA Victor EP titled "Peace in the Valley".

Although there would be further RCA Camden Presley collections, this was the final release that featured previously unreleased tracks. Beginning in 1974, RCA would release several unissued recordings in its Elvis: A Legendary Performer series, followed by the issue of a multitude of previously unreleased Presley recordings in the decades after his death.

The track listing below shows the songs as they appeared on the second CD reissue of this album in 2006. The original 1971 LP omitted "Swing Down Sweet Chariot," taken from the 1960 album His Hand in Mine, though this track was included on UK releases of the album. This was due to U.S. RCA Camden Presley releases at the time being generally formatted to have 9 tracks: 5 on Side 1 but only 4 songs on Side 2, thus leaving no room for "Swing Low".

== Track listing ==
Side one
No.	Title	Writer(s)	Recording date	Length
1.	"You'll Never Walk Alone"	Oscar Hammerstein II and Richard Rodgers	September 11, 1967	2:45
2.	"Who Am I?" (previously unreleased)	Rusty Goodman	February 22, 1969	3:20
3.	"Let Us Pray" (from Change of Habit, previously unreleased)	Buddy Kaye and Ben Weisman	March 5 & 6, 1969	3:01
4.	"(There'll Be) Peace in the Valley"	Thomas A. Dorsey	January 13, 1957	3:23
5.	"We Call on Him"	Fred Karger, Sid Wayne, and Ben Weisman	September 10 & 11, 1967	2:33

Side two
No.	Title	Writer(s)	Recording date	Length
1.	"I Believe"	Ervin Drake, Irvin Graham, Jimmy Shirl, and Al Stillman	January 12, 1957	2:06
2.	"It Is No Secret (What God Can Do)"	Stuart Hamblen	January 19, 1957	3:55
3.	"Sing You Children" (from Easy Come, Easy Go)	Fred Burch and Gerald Nelson	September 28, 1966	2:14
4.	"Take My Hand, Precious Lord"	Thomas A. Dorsey	January 13, 1957	3:17
5.	"Swing Down Sweet Chariot" (UK edition only)	Traditional	October 31, 1960	2:34

== Charts ==
Chart (1971)	Peak position
US Billboard 200	69
