= Rags to Riches (1953 song) =

1953 popular music song

"Rags To Riches"

Single by Tony Bennett
- B-side: "Here Comes That Heartache Again"
- Released: August 3, 1953
- Recorded: March 17, 1953
- Studio: Columbia 30th Street, New York City
- Genre: Pop
- Length: 2:50
- Label: Columbia
- Producer: Percy Faith

Tony Bennett singles chronology
"Someone Turned The Moon Upside Down" (1953)	"Rags To Riches" (1953)	"Stranger in Paradise" (1953)

"Rags to Riches"

Single by Elvis Presley
- B-side: "Where Did They Go, Lord?"
- Released: February 23, 1971
- Recorded: September 22, 1970
- Studio: RCA Studio B, Nashville
- Genre: Pop, rock n' roll
- Label: RCA Victor
- Songwriter: Richard Adler

Elvis Presley singles chronology
"I Really Don't Want to Know" (1970)	"Rags to Riches" (1971)	"Life" (1971)

"Rags to Riches" is a 1953 popular song by Richard Adler and Jerry Ross.

== Background ==
It is based on a famous Russian tune called "Volga Melody" by Yuri Shchetkov sometimes known as "Samara My Lovely Town". The bridge passage or middle 8 was inserted by the composer.

== Tony Bennett recording ==
The best-known version of the song, recorded by Tony Bennett with Percy Faith and his orchestra, was No.1 for eight weeks on the Billboard chart in 1953 and became a gold record. In 2012, he recorded a Spanglish version with bachata singer Romeo Santos for his album Viva Duets.

== Other versions ==
- Later in 1953, a version by David Whitfield reached No.3 in the British charts
- Another version in 1953, by Billy Ward and his Dominoes with Jackie Wilson singing lead made number two on Billboard's Most Played in Juke Boxes chart.
- Later recordings by Sunny & the Sunliners (No. 45 in 1963) and Elvis Presley (No 33 in 1971) also made the Billboard charts.

== See also ==
- List of number-one singles of 1953 (U.S.)
