= Life (Elvis Presley song) =

Single by Elvis Presley

from the album Love Letters from Elvis
- B-side: "Only Believe"
- Released: April 27, 1971
- Recorded: June 6, 1970
- Studio: RCA Studio B, Nashville
- Genre: Gospel
- Length: 3:22
- Label: RCA Victor
- Songwriter(s): Shirl Milete
- Producer(s): Felton Jarvis

Elvis Presley singles chronology
"Rags to Riches" (1971)	"Life" / "Only Believe" (1971)	"I'm Leavin'" (1971)

"Life" is a song written and originally recorded by Shirl Milete in 1969. Elvis Presley recorded the song on June 6, 1970. Presley's version was released as single, peaking at No. 53 on the Billboard Hot 100, No. 8 on the Easy Listening chart, and No. 34 on the Country Singles chart. It was a double A-side with "Only Believe". It was included on Presley's Love Letters from Elvis album.

== Critical response ==
Billboard reviewed the single "Life/Only Believe" in its May 8, 1971, issue. The magazine characterizes the song "Life" as "a gospel-oriented ballad that builds into a heavy production."
