= Snowbird (song) =

Single by Anne Murray

from the album This Way Is My Way
- B-side: "Just Bidin' My Time"
- Released: June 1970
- Recorded: Fall 1969
- Genre: Country, Folk-pop
- Length: 2:10
- Label: Capitol
- Songwriter: Gene MacLellan
- Producer: Brian Ahern

Anne Murray singles chronology
"Bidin' My Time" (1970)	"Snowbird" (1970)	"Put Your Hand in the Hand" (1971)

"Snowbird" is a song written by Canadian singer-songwriter Gene MacLellan. Though it has been recorded by many performers, it is best known through Anne Murray's 1969 recording. "Snowbird" appeared as a track in mid-1969 on Murray's second studio album This Way Is My Way, and was released in mid-1970 as a single.

The song was a No. 2 hit on Canada's pop chart and went to No. 1 on both the Canadian adult contemporary and country charts. The song reached No. 8 on the U.S. pop singles chart, spent six weeks at No. 1 on the U.S. adult contemporary chart, and became a surprise Top 10 U.S. country hit as well. It was certified as a gold single by the RIAA, the first American Gold record ever awarded to a Canadian solo female artist. It peaked at No. 23 on the UK Singles Chart. In 2003 it was an inaugural song inductee of the Canadian Songwriters Hall of Fame.

Anne Murray and Gene MacLellan had met while both were regulars on the CBC television series Singalong Jubilee and Murray recorded two of MacLellan's compositions, "Snowbird" and "Biding My Time", for her first major label album release, This Way Is My Way, in 1969. Murray would recall: "Gene told me he wrote ["Snowbird"] in twenty minutes while walking on a beach on Prince Edward Island."

"Snowbird" sold well over a million copies and was picked as 19th on the 50 Tracks: The Canadian Version list, a partially populist approach to defining the most influential songs by Canadians.

== Chart performance ==
=== Weekly singles charts ===
Chart (1970)	Peak position
Australia	77
Canadian RPM Country Tracks	1
Canadian RPM Top Singles	2
Canada RPM Adult Contemporary	10
Ireland (IRMA)	20
New Zealand (Listener)	3
UK	23
US Hot Country Songs (Billboard)	10
US Billboard Easy Listening	1
US Billboard Hot 100	8
US Cash Box Top 100	6

=== Year-end charts ===
Chart (1970)	Rank
Canada RPM Top Singles	20
U.S. Billboard Hot 100	42
U.S. Cash Box	64
