= Ocean (band) =

Canadian gospel/soft rock band

- Origin: Toronto, Ontario, Canada
- Genres: Gospel rock, soft rock, Christian music
- Years active: 1970–1975
- Labels: Yorkville, Kama Sutra
- Past members: Greg Brown; Jeff Jones; Janice Morgan; Dave Tamblyn; Chuck Slater

Ocean was a Canadian gospel/soft rock band formed in 1970 in Toronto, Ontario. They are best known for their 1971 single "Put Your Hand in the Hand". The single peaked at No. 2 on the U.S. Billboard Hot 100, and reached No. 4 on the Billboard Adult Contemporary chart.

"Put Your Hand in the Hand" was inducted into the Canadian Songwriters Hall of Fame, in 2006.

== Background ==
Ocean consisted of Greg Brown (vocals, keyboard), Jeff Jones (bass, vocals), Janice Morgan (guitar, vocals), Dave Tamblyn (guitar), and Chuck Slater (drums). Dave Tamblyn had previously been in the group Natural Gas.

== Career ==
They recorded their debut album, Put Your Hand in the Hand, in Toronto in 1970. The album, originally released on the Yorkville label in Canada, contained eight songs, including covers of songs by Robbie Robertson and Gene MacLellan. The album was picked up in the U.S. by the Kama Sutra label, which also released the band's second album, Give Tomorrow's Children One More Chance, in both the U.S. and Canada.

Ocean managed additional hits in Canada with the songs "We've Got a Dream" and "One More Chance", both written by the British songwriting team of Roger Cook and Roger Greenaway, but they failed to make any further impact in the U.S., and the group disbanded in 1975 after having released two albums.

== Later years ==
Chuck Slater died by suicide in 1987.

== Discography ==
=== Albums ===
Year	Album	Chart Positions	
Year	Album	CAN	US
1971	Put Your Hand in the Hand	47	60
1972	Give Tomorrow's Children One More Chance	—	—

=== Singles ===
Year	Single	Chart Positions					Album
Year	Single	CAN	CAN AC	CAN Country	US	US AC	Album
1971	"Put Your Hand in the Hand"	10	6	34	2	4	Put Your Hand in the Hand
1971	"Deep Enough for Me"	54	—	—	73	—	Put Your Hand in the Hand
1971	"We Got a Dream"	47	—	—	82	37	Put Your Hand in the Hand
1972	"Make the Sun Shine"	75	19	—	—	—	Give Tomorrow's Children One More Chance
1972	"One More Chance"	12	1	—	76	30	Give Tomorrow's Children One More Chance
1973	"I Have a Following"	83	—	—	—	—	non-album single
