= I'm Leavin' (Elvis Presley song) =

Single by Elvis Presley
- B-side: "Heart of Rome"
- Released: June 22, 1971
- Recorded: May 20, 1971
- Studio: RCA Studio B, Nashville
- Genre: Soft rock
- Length: 2:48
- Label: RCA Victor
- Songwriters: Sonny Charles; Michael Jarret

Elvis Presley singles chronology
"Life" (1971)	"I'm Leavin'" / "Heart of Rome" (1971)	"It's Only Love" / "The Sound of Your Cry" (1971)

Professional ratings
Review scores
Source	Rating
Billboard	Top 60 Pop Spotlight

"I'm Leavin'" is a 1971 song by Elvis Presley. It was written by Sonny Charles and Michael Jarrett.

The song was originally released in 1971 as a single, with "Heart of Rome" (from the album Love Letters from Elvis) on the B-side. In the United States "I'm Leavin'" reached number 36 on Billboard Hot 100 for the week of August 21, 1971. In the UK Singles Chart, it reached number 23 for the week of October 2, 1971.

Later "I'm Leavin'" was included in the 1980 box set Elvis Aron Presley (on the record 8 titled "Lost Singles").

== Personnel ==
Sourced from Keith Flynn and AFM session logs.

- Elvis Presley – lead vocals
- Glen Spreen – string and horn arrangements
- James Burton – guitar
- Chip Young – guitar
- Charlie Hodge – acoustic rhythm guitar
- Norbert Putnam – bass
- David Briggs – piano
- Charlie McCoy – organ
- Kenneth Buttrey – drums
- The Imperials (Jim Murray, Terry Blackwood, Greg Gordon, Joe Moscheo, Armond Morales) – backing vocals
- Mary Holladay, Ginger Holladay, Millie Kirkham – backing vocals

== Charts ==
Chart (1971)	Peak position
UK (Official Charts Company)	23
US Billboard Hot 100	36
