= Paul Rader (evangelist) =

American football coach and pastor (1879–1938)

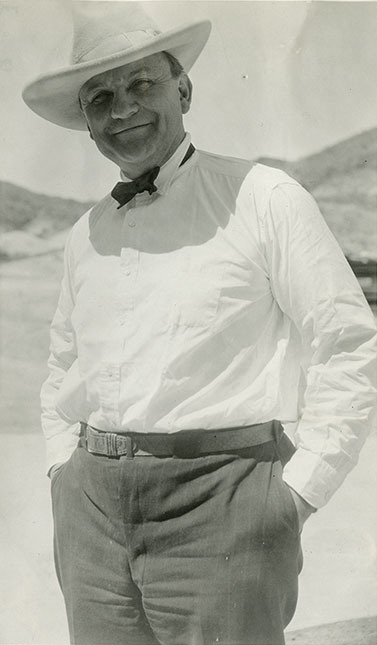

Biographical details
- Born: August 24, 1879; Denver, Colorado, U.S.
- Died: July 19, 1938 (aged 58); Los Angeles, California, U.S.

Playing career
- c. 1898: Denver
- 1899: Colorado
- 1900: Central (MO)
- 1901–1902: Hamline
- 1903: Puget Sound
- 1907: Multnomah Athletic Club
- Position: Fullback

Coaching career (HC unless noted)
- 1900: Central (MO)
- 1901–1902: Hamline
- 1903: Puget Sound

Head coaching record
- Overall: 12–10–2

Daniel Paul Rader (August 24, 1879 – July 19, 1938) was an American evangelist and college football player and coach. Influential in the Chicago area during the early 20th century, he was the first nationwide radio preacher in the United States. Rader was senior pastor of the renowned Moody Church from 1915 to 1921 and was also the second president of the Christian and Missionary Alliance.

== Education and football career ==
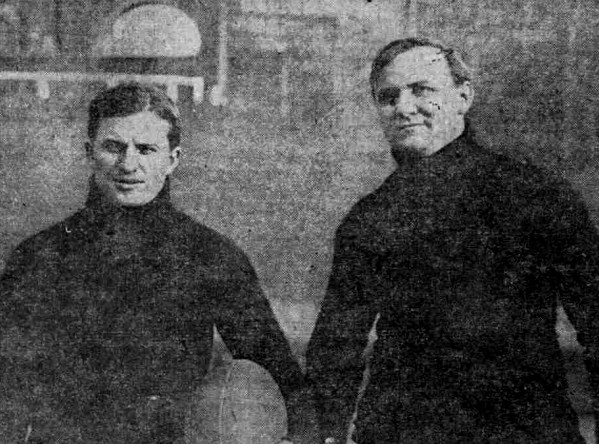
Rader (right) as a member of the Multnomah Athletic Club football team in 1907.

Rader attended the University of Colorado and played as a fullback on the 1899 Colorado Silver and Gold football team. In 1900, he was a player-coach at Central College—now known as Central Methodist University—in Fayette, Missouri.

Rader attended Hamline University in Saint Paul, Minnesota, where in 1901 he helped found the Beta Omicron Sigma Kappa social fraternity, or the Brotherhood of Scholarly Knights. This went on to become the Alpha chapter of Beta Kappa fraternity, which after the merger with Theta Chi fraternity became Beta Kappa chapter of Theta Chi. He served as a player-coach on the Hamline football team in 1901 and 1902. Rader was seriously injured in a game against Carleton in 1902. He was knocked unconscious for three hours before being treated by a doctor.

In 1903, Rader coached the football team at the University of Puget Sound. He led the team to a record of 6–0–1.

In early 1904, Rader was appointed as football coach at Washington Agricultural College—now known as Washington State University—in Pullman, Washington. However, by the summer of 1904, the school's administrators could not locate Rader, who was working as a pastor at a church in Boston, and began negotiations with James N. Ashmore, who had coached the 1903 Washington Agricultural football team, to return in 1904. Everett Sweeley was ultimately hired to coach the 1904 Washington Agricultural football team.

Rader played for the Multnomah Athletic Club's football team in 1907.

== Evangelical career ==
In 1925, Rader, who had been holding revival camp meetings in Tower Lakes, Illinois, bought 367 acres there, with plans for summer cottages, a radio station and a tabernacle that could accommodate 5,000 hearers. But he sold the land the next year to a residential developer after building only a few cottages. He also started a Tabernacle in Los Angeles, in 1929. The daily Tabernacle radio broadcasts featured singers accompanied by pianist Rudy Atwood.

Rader wrote several hymns during his lengthy career, one of which was "Only Believe", a personal favorite of singer Elvis Presley. Presley recorded the song in 1970 for his album Love Letters from Elvis and it was subsequently released as a single in 1971, where it spent two weeks on the chart, peaking at No. 95. "Only Believe" was also the theme song of William Branham's campaigns as well as a favorite of Smith Wigglesworth.

Rader also published a novel, Big Bug, which was about Hollywood as the sin center of America. Rader's great-nephew, also named Paul Rader, served as General of the Salvation Army, and President of Asbury University.

== Death ==
Rader died on July 19, 1938, at Hollywood Hospital in Los Angeles. He was buried at Forest Lawn Memorial Park in Glendale, California.

== Head coaching record ==
Year	Team	Overall	Conference	Standing	Bowl/playoffs
Central (MO) (Independent) (1900)
1900	Central (MO)	2–2			
Central (MO):		2–2			
Hamline (Independent) (1901–1902)
1901	Hamline	3–3			
1902	Hamline	1–5–1			
Hamline:		4–8–1			
Puget Sound (Independent) (1903)
1903	Puget Sound	6–0–1			
Puget Sound:		6–0–1			
Total:		12–10–2			
