= Put Your Hand in the Hand =

Single by Ocean

from the album Put Your Hand in the Hand
- B-side: "Tear Down the Fences"
- Released: February 1971
- Genre: Pop, gospel
- Length: 2:52; 3:53 – Remix 2006
- Label: Kama Sutra
- Songwriter: Gene MacLellan
- Producers: Greg Brown, Ocean

Ocean singles chronology
"Put Your Hand in the Hand" (1971)	"Deep Enough for Me" (1970)

Audio
- "Put Your Hand in the Hand" (single edit) on YouTube

"Put Your Hand in the Hand" is a gospel pop song composed by Gene MacLellan and first recorded by Canadian singer Anne Murray in 1970 on her third studio album, Honey, Wheat and Laughter.

It became a hit single for the Canadian band Ocean, released as their debut single and title track to their 1971 debut album. The song peaked at No. 2 on the U.S. Billboard Hot 100, kept from No. 1 by "Joy to the World" by Three Dog Night. It remained in the top 10 for seven weeks, and was ranked as the No. 33 song for 1971 according to Billboard. The song also reached No. 4 on the Adult Contemporary chart. The band received fan mail for the song from religious figures such as Billy Graham and the Bishop of Toronto.

After MacLellan's suicide in 1995, his friend and fellow Atlantic Canadian musician Ron Hynes wrote the song "Godspeed" as a tribute, the lyrics for which reference the title of this song.

The song was inducted into the Canadian Songwriters Hall of Fame in 2006. A remix from the same year adds an instrumental, which occurs between the second chorus and the second verse, as well as a repeat of the chorus and a final instrumentalist chorus, that ends without the fade.

== Track listing ==
7" single

A1 "Put Your Hand in the Hand" – 2:52
A2 "Tear Down the Fences" – 2:53

== Chart history ==
=== Weekly charts ===
Ocean

Weekly chart performance for "Put Your Hand in the Hand" by Ocean
Chart (1971)	Peak position
Australia (Kent Music Report)	6
Belgium (Ultratop 50 Flanders)	1
Belgium (Ultratop 50 Wallonia)	18
Canada RPM Adult Contemporary	6
Canada RPM Top Singles	10
Canada RPM Country	34
Germany (GfK)	13
Italy (Billboard)	5
Netherlands (Dutch Top 40)	3
Netherlands (Single Top 100)	3
New Zealand (Listener)	1
Norway (VG-lista)	1
Switzerland (Schweizer Hitparade)	4
US Billboard Hot 100	2
US Billboard Adult Contemporary	4
US Cash Box Top 100	2

=== Year-end charts ===
Chart (1971)	Rank
Australia	62
Canada	66
U.S. Billboard Hot 100	33
U.S. Easy Listening (Billboard)	38
U.S. Cash Box	20

Alan Garrity

Chart (1971)	Peak position
South Africa (Springbok)	1

Chart (1971)	Rank
South Africa	5

== Cover versions ==
The song was covered in the 1970s by a number of other performers, including Elvis Presley (who also covered MacLellan's "Snowbird"), Randy Stonehill, Larry Norman, Tennessee Ernie Ford, Frankie Laine, Donny Hathaway, Joan Baez, Shirley Caesar, Sammy Davis, Jr., Dutch group Himalaya, the Les Humphries Singers, a German-language version ("Ich fand eine Hand") [I Found a Hand] by Cindy & Bert, a French-language version ("Prends ma main") by Canadian singer Renée Martel, and recorded by Bing Crosby for his 1972 album Bing 'n' Basie. It was also covered, and often sung in concert, by Anita Bryant.

Evangelist Garner Ted Armstrong rendered his take on the song in a January 1976 episode of Hee Haw. Country acts Sandy Posey, Lynn Anderson, Loretta Lynn, and The Oak Ridge Boys also recorded the song.

Christopher Norton and Richard Lacy made minor wording changes in a release under Whole World Publishing's 1999 copyright.

South African singer Ray Dylan recorded it on his 2009 album Goeie Ou Country - Op Aanvraag.

== Later uses ==
- As a sample in 1989 song "Looking Down the Barrel of a Gun" by Beastie Boys on their Paul's Boutique album.
- In a 1991 episode of the sitcom Family Matters titled "Choir Trouble", the cast was singing the song in their church as part of their Gospel Fest.
- In the 2013 film Prisoners.
- In a 2017 episode of US television series Last Man Standing titled “Take Me to Church”
