= Bosom of Abraham (song) =

Traditional African-American spiritual

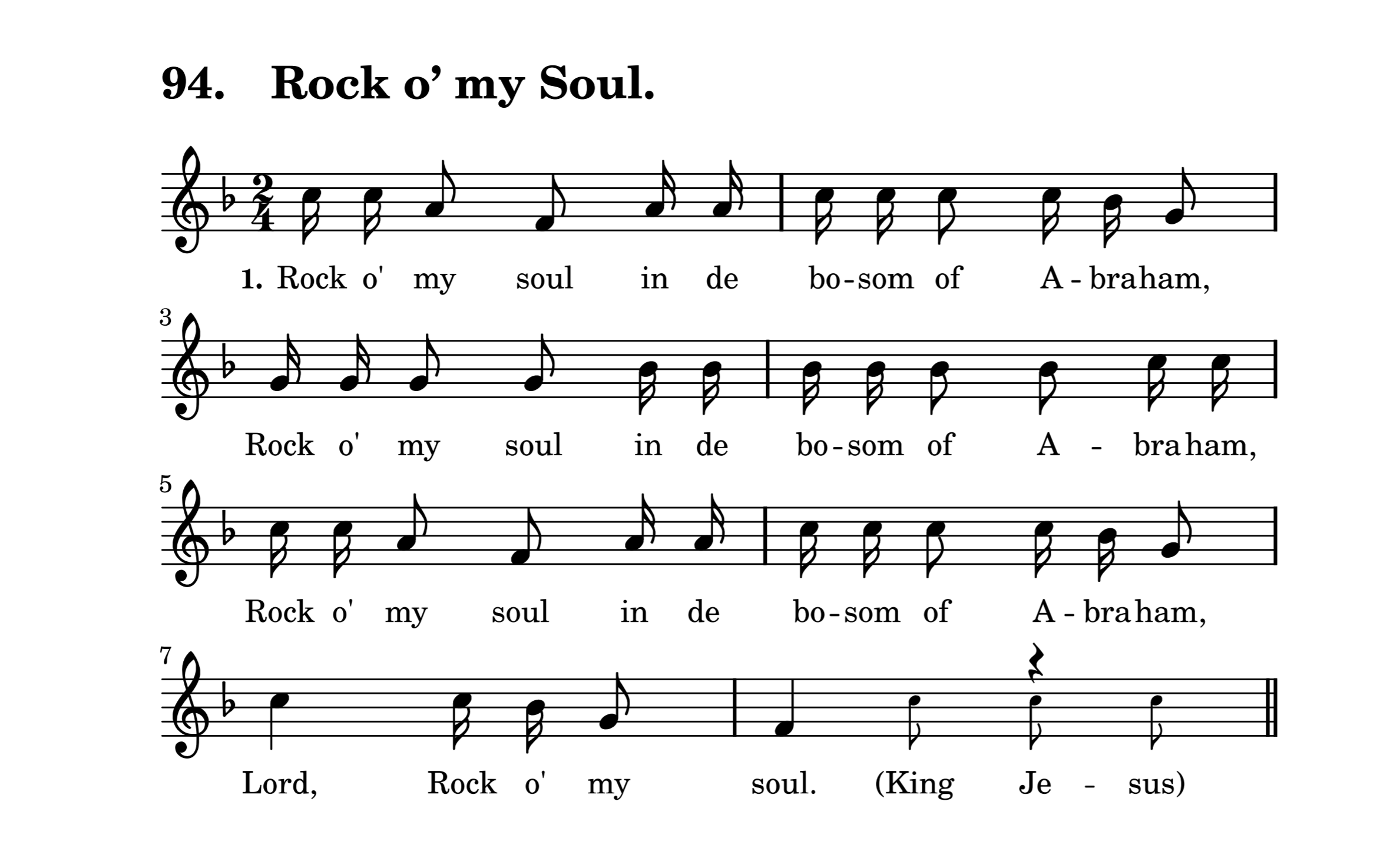
"Rock o' My Soul" from the 1867 collection Slave Songs of the United States

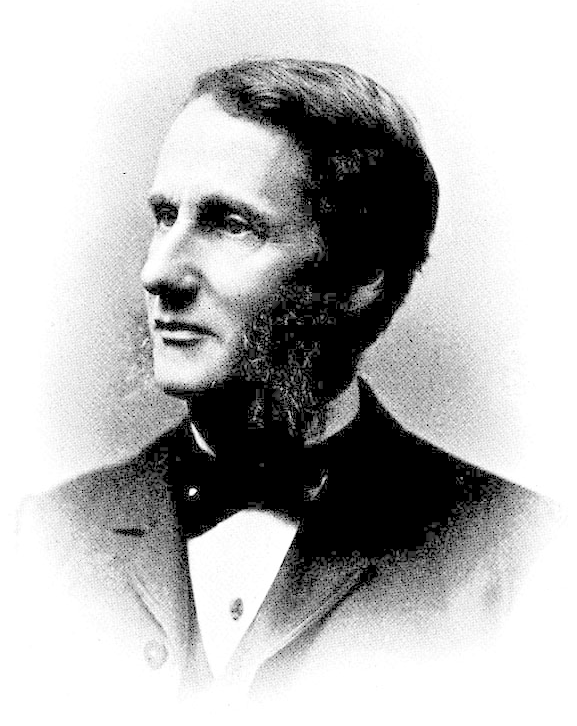
William Francis Allen, who documented "Rock o' My Soul" (1867)

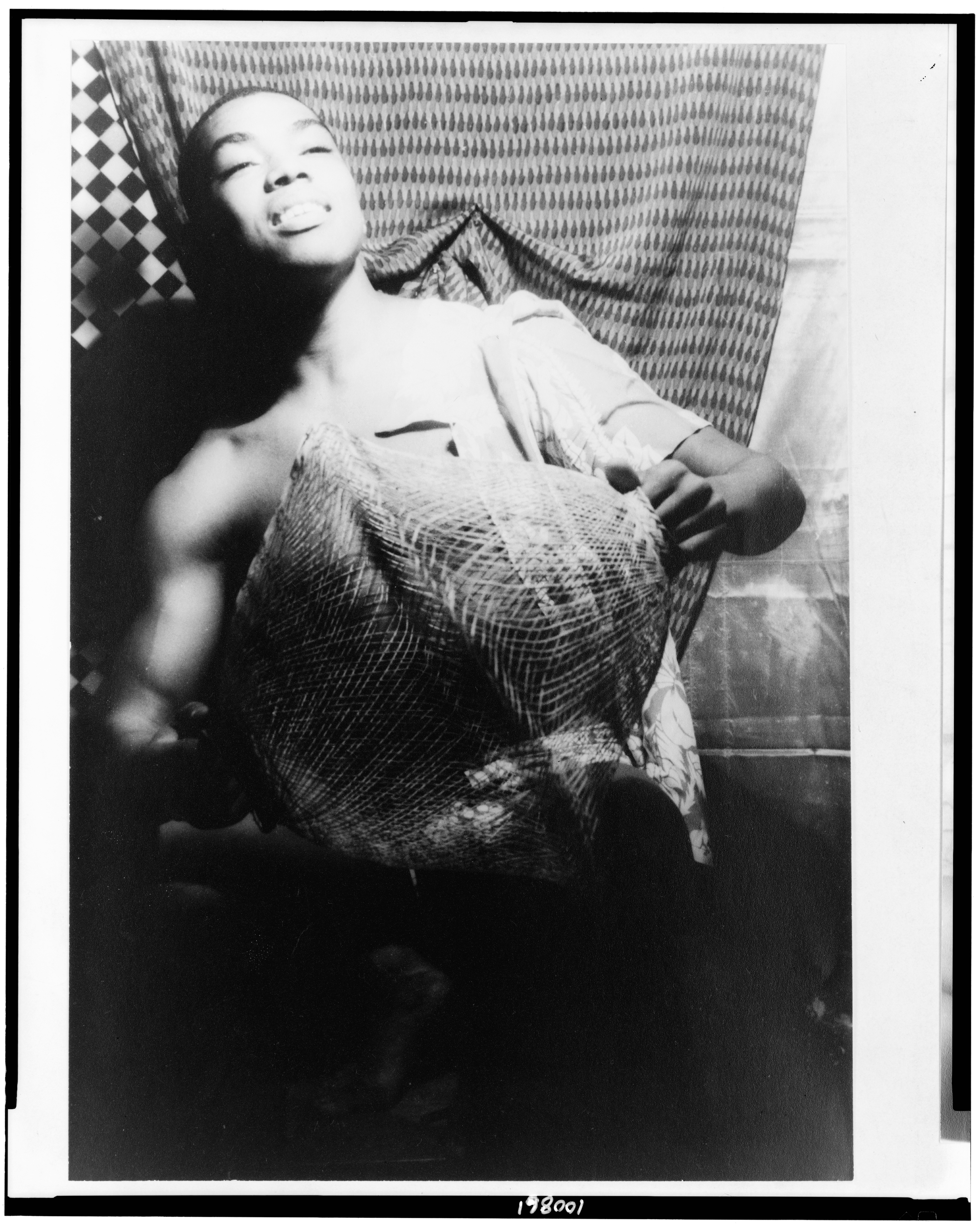
Portrait of Alvin Ailey (1955)

"Rock O' My Soul", also known as "Rock My Soul", "Bosom of Abraham" or "Rocka My Soul", is a traditional African American spiritual. It was first documented by William Francis Allen, in the 1867 collection Slave Songs of the United States. Allen attributed the origin of the song to the state of Virginia and documented the following lyrics:

Rock o' my soul in de bosom of Abraham,
Rock o' my soul in de bosom of Abraham,
Rock o' my soul in de bosom of Abraham,
Lord, Rock o' my soul. (King Jesus)

One of the earliest recorded version was made in 1937 by the Heavenly Gospel Singers. Notable artists who have recorded the song include the Jordanaires, Louis Armstrong, Lonnie Donegan, Peter Paul & Mary and Elvis Presley.

Alvin Ailey made "Rocka My Soul in the Bosom of Abraham" the music for the triumphant finale of his internationally known choreography Revelations, which was born out of the choreographer's "blood memories" of his childhood in rural Texas and attending the Baptist Church with his mother. It was also performed as a tribute at his 1989 funeral at the Cathedral of St. John the Divine. Israeli dancer and choreographer Nadav Zelner used "Rocka My Soul in the Bosom of Abraham" as music for a clip for his student dance troupe.
