= Gene MacLellan =

Canadian singer-songwriter

- Born: February 2, 1938; Val-d'Or, Quebec, Canada
- Died: January 19, 1995 (aged 56) Summerside, Prince Edward Island, Canada
- Genre: Country
- Occupation: Singer-songwriter
- Instruments: Guitar, vocals
- Years active: 1950s–1995
- Website: http://www.genemaclellan.com

Gene MacLellan (February 2, 1938 – January 19, 1995) was a Canadian singer-songwriter from Prince Edward Island. Among his compositions were "Snowbird", made famous by Anne Murray, "Put Your Hand in the Hand", "The Call", "Pages of Time", and "Thorn in My Shoe". Elvis Presley, Lynn Anderson, Loretta Lynn, Joan Baez, and Bing Crosby were among the many artists who recorded MacLellan's songs.

== Early life ==
MacLellan was born in Val-d'Or, Quebec, in 1938. He grew up in Toronto in a working class Presbyterian family. As a child, MacLellan contracted polio.

MacLellan was one of the founding members of The Consuls, a Toronto rock band formed in 1956. He played lead and rhythm guitar and sang with the group between 1956 and 1960. In 1963, MacLellan was injured in a car accident in which his father died. MacLellan suffered scarring on the left side of his face as a result of the accident. In 1964, he moved to Pownal, Prince Edward Island, where he lived with his aunt and worked as a farm labourer and mental hospital attendant.

== Career ==
While living in Prince Edward Island, MacLellan began writing songs, including "Snowbird", which was inspired by his observation of a flock of snow buntings on a beach. He made his first television appearance in 1970 on Don Messer's Jubilee. In the same year, he became a regular performer on Singalong Jubilee with Anne Murray and Bill Langstroth.

In 1970, Anne Murray's recording of "Snowbird" became a hit in Canada and the United States. BMI recognized MacLellan as the first Canadian lyricist to have a song broadcast over one million times in the United States. MacLellan won a Juno Award in 1971 as Canadian composer of the year, while Anne Murray was named best female vocalist. Anne Murray also recorded another MacLellan song, "Just Bidin' My Time", which was issued on the same 45 RPM single as "Snowbird".

MacLellan released his self-titled album in 1970, which included "The Call", another of his compositions that became a hit for Anne Murray. His shy and introspective nature made public performances difficult for him. He made his first cross-country tour in early 1972. In Toronto, he played at Massey Hall, the Canadian National Exhibition, and the Riverboat coffee house.

In 1971, Canadian band Ocean's recording of MacLellan's "Put Your Hand in the Hand" became a hit, reaching number two on the pop charts in the United States and number ten in Canada. Over 100 performers, including Elvis Presley, Joan Baez, and Bing Crosby have recorded "Put Your Hand in the Hand".

MacLellan released a second album, If It's Alright with You, in 1977. In 1979, he recorded Gene and Marty, an album of gospel songs, with his fellow Prince Edward Islander Marty Reno. From 1980 until his death in 1995, MacLellan performed only in small noncommercial venues such as churches, prisons and nursing homes. He was active in "Cons for Christ", a Christian organization dedicated to the rehabilitation of prison inmates in Canada.

== Mental health issues and death ==
MacLellan suffered from depression throughout his life. During his later years, his condition worsened, leading to hospitalization at Prince County Hospital in Summerside, Prince Edward Island. Shortly after his release from the hospital, MacLellan died by suicide at his home in Summerside, on January 19, 1995.

== Posthumous awards and tributes ==
MacLellan was posthumously inducted into the Canadian Country Music Hall of Fame in 1995. In 1996 he was given the East Coast Music Association's Dr. Helen Creighton Lifetime Achievement Award.

Upon hearing of MacLellan's passing, Ron Hynes sat down at his piano and wrote the song "Godspeed" in 10 minutes, as described in the Ron Hynes biography One Man Grand Band [p 149-150], by Harvey Sawler.

In 1995, the Canadian folk singer John Gracie released a tribute album titled A Gene MacLellan Tribute. (#36 in Canada)

In 2017, MacLellan's daughter Catherine MacLellan presented a show titled If It's Alright with You – The Life and Music of My Father, Gene MacLellan that was described as "part theatre, part Island music history lesson, and part mental-health awareness campaign". Her album If It's Alright with You: The Songs of Gene MacLellan was released on June 30, 2017, by True North Records. She believes that her father would appreciate the tribute. "He would be happy to know his songs continue on, being remembered and given a new spark," she said. "It’s a testament to what a young guy from very humble beginnings can do." In 2018, a documentary about MacLellan's life, music and struggle with mental illness, The Song and the Sorrow, was released.

== Discography ==
=== Albums ===
Year	Album	CAN
1970	Gene MacLellan	80
1970	Street Corner Preacher	—
1977	If It's Alright with You	—
1979	Gene & Marty (with Marty Reno)	—
1997	Lonesome River (posthumous compilation)	—

=== Singles ===
Year	Single	Chart Positions			Album
Year	Single	CAN Country	CAN AC	CAN	Album
1970	"The Call"	15	—	91	Gene MacLellan
1970	"Thorn in My Shoe"	20	—	—	Gene MacLellan
1971	"Isle of Saint Jean"	—	8	84	Gene MacLellan
1971	"Pages of Time"	26	—	—	Gene MacLellan
1972	"Lonesome River"	16	—	—	singles only
1972	"I Get Drunk on Monday"	—	10	—	singles only
1977	"Shilo Song"	14	—	—	If It's Alright with You
