= Way Down in the Jungle Room =

Compilation album by Elvis Presley
- Released: August 5, 2016
- Recorded: February 2–8, 1976 and October 28–30, 1976
- Studio: Graceland, Memphis, Tennessee; Overdubs later recorded at Young 'Un Sound, Murfreesboro, Tennessee and Creative Workshop, Nashville, Tennessee
- Length: 2:10:35
- Label: RCA; Legacy
- Producer: Elvis Presley (exec.), Felton Jarvis (associate), Ernst Mikael Jørgensen (compilation), Rob Santos (compilation)

Elvis Presley chronology
I'm Leavin (2016)	Way Down in the Jungle Room (2016)	The Wonder of You (2016)

Way Down in the Jungle Room is a compilation album by American singer Elvis Presley. It was released on August 5, 2016, by RCA Records and Legacy Recordings. The album features master recordings and outtakes from two recording sessions on February 2–8, 1976, and October 28–30, 1976, in the Jungle Room, a recording studio set up by Elvis in the den of Graceland in Memphis, Tennessee. The first disc, subtitled The Masters, features material from these sessions that were later released on From Elvis Presley Boulevard, Memphis, Tennessee (1976), and the subsequent final studio album, Moody Blue (1977). The second disc, The Outtakes, features outtakes and "in-the-studio dialog" newly mixed by Matt Ross-Spang at the Sam Phillips Recording Studio.

== Commercial performance ==
In the United Kingdom, the album debuted at number 16 on the UK Albums Chart with first-week sales of 3,665 units. The album debuted at number 6 on the Top Country Albums and number 79 on the Billboard 200 with 7,000 equivalent album units. The album has sold 14,000 copies as of September 2016.

== Track listing ==
Disc 1: The Masters
No.	Title	Writer(s)	Length
1.	"Way Down"	Layng Martine Jr.	2:38
2.	"She Thinks I Still Care"	Dickey Lee	3:51
3.	"Bitter They Are, Harder They Fall"	Larry Gatlin	3:17
4.	"Pledging My Love"	Fats Washington; Don Robey	2:51
5.	"For the Heart"	Dennis Linde	3:22
6.	"Love Coming Down"	Jerry Chesnut	3:07
7.	"He'll Have to Go"	Joe Allison; Audrey Allison	4:32
8.	"Blue Eyes Crying in the Rain"	Fred Rose	3:41
9.	"Hurt"	Jimmie Crane; Al Jacobs	2:07
10.	"Never Again"	Billy Edd Wheeler; Chesnut	2:51
11.	"Danny Boy"	Frederic Weatherly	3:56
12.	"Solitaire"	Neil Sedaka; Phil Cody	4:40
13.	"Moody Blue"	Mark James	2:49
14.	"It's Easy for You"	Andrew Lloyd Webber; Tim Rice	3:27
15.	"I'll Never Fall in Love Again"	Lonnie Donegan; Jimmy Currie	3:44
16.	"The Last Farewell"	Roger Whittaker; Ron Webster	4:02
Total length:			54:55

Disc 2: The Outtakes
No.	Title	Writer(s)	Length
1.	"Bitter They Are, Harder They Fall" (take 1)	Gatlin	5:15
2.	"She Thinks I Still Care" (take 10)	Lee	6:30
3.	"The Last Farewell" (take 2)	Whittaker; Webster	4:15
4.	"Solitaire" (take 7)	Sedaka; Cody	5:37
5.	"I'll Never Fall In Love Again" (take 5)	Donegan; Currie	4:04
6.	"Moody Blue" (take 1)	James	3:53
7.	"For the Heart" (take 1)	Linde	3:55
8.	"Hurt" (take 3)	Crane; Jacobs	2:30
9.	"Danny Boy" (take 9)	Weatherly	4:02
10.	"Never Again" (take 9)	Wheeler; Chesnut	3:56
11.	"Love Coming Down" (take 3)	Chesnut	3:17
12.	"Blue Eyes Crying in the Rain" (take 4)	Rose	4:59
13.	"She Thinks I Still Care" (alternate version - take 2)	Lee	4:26
14.	"It's Easy for You" (take 1)	Webber; Rice	5:24
15.	"Way Down" (take 2)	Martine Jr.	3:50
16.	"Pledging My Love" (take 3)	Washington; Robey	5:34
17.	"For the Heart" (take 4)	Linde	4:13
Total length:			1:15:40

== Charts ==
Chart (2016)	Peak position
Australian Albums (ARIA)	9
Austrian Albums (Ö3 Austria)	32
Belgian Albums (Ultratop Flanders)	22
Belgian Albums (Ultratop Wallonia)	33
Dutch Albums (Album Top 100)	25
French Albums (SNEP)	161
German Albums (Offizielle Top 100)	67
Irish Albums (IRMA)	29
Italian Albums (FIMI)	68
Scottish Albums (OCC)	12
Spanish Albums (PROMUSICAE)	91
Swedish Albums (Sverigetopplistan)	59
Swiss Albums (Schweizer Hitparade)	26
UK Albums (OCC)	16
US Billboard 200	79
US Top Country Albums (Billboard)	6
