= From Elvis Presley Boulevard, Memphis, Tennessee =

Studio album by Elvis Presley
- Released: May 16, 1976
- Recorded: February 2–7, 1976
- Studio: Graceland (Memphis)
- Genres: Soul; country; pop
- Length: 34:48
- Label: RCA Victor
- Producer: Felton Jarvis

Elvis Presley chronology
The Sun Sessions (1976)	From Elvis Presley Boulevard, Memphis, Tennessee (1976)	Welcome to My World (1977)

Singles from From Elvis Presley Boulevard, Memphis, Tennessee
- 1. "Hurt" Released: March 12, 1976

Professional ratings
Review scores
Source	Rating
AllMusic	3/5 stars
MusicHound	1/5 stars
The Rolling Stone Album Guide	2/5 stars
Rough Guides	2/5 stars

From Elvis Presley Boulevard, Memphis, Tennessee is the twenty-third studio album by American singer and musician Elvis Presley, released by RCA Records in May 1976. It became Presley's fourth album to reach No. 1 on the Billboard country music album sales chart within the last four years.

"Hurt" was a top 10 hit on both the country and adult contemporary charts, while "For the Heart" stalled at No. 45 on the country charts. The former did make the pop top 30. Both songs would again find success on the country charts in the '80s – "For the Heart" became the first single for the Judds in 1983, while Juice Newton took her version of "Hurt" to No. 1 in 1986.

From Elvis Presley Boulevard, Memphis, Tennessee was certified Gold on October 10, 1977, by the RIAA.

== Content ==
It is often assumed that From Elvis Presley Boulevard, Memphis, Tennessee is a concert recording as the album states the songs were "recorded live". While this is true, it means the songs were recorded live in the recording studio set up in Presley's mansion, Graceland, not in front of an audience. Two songs recorded during the session, "Moody Blue" and "She Thinks I Still Care" would be released the following year on his final album, Moody Blue.

== Reissues ==
In 2000 the album's tracks were added to Moody Blue to create an expanded 19-track CD of the latter title. In 2000 a two-disc edition of From Elvis Presley Boulevard, Memphis, Tennessee was issued on the "Follow That Dream" label.

== Track listing ==
=== Original LP release ===
All songs recorded at Graceland, Memphis.

Side one
No.	Title	Writer(s)	Recording date	Length
1.	"Hurt"	Jimmie Crane, Al Jacobs	February 5, 1976	2:09
2.	"Never Again"	Billy Edd Wheeler and Jerry Chesnut	February 6, 1976	2:53
3.	"Blue Eyes Crying in the Rain"	Fred Rose	February 7, 1976	3:44
4.	"Danny Boy"	Frederic E. Weatherly	February 5, 1976	3:59
5.	"The Last Farewell"	Roger Whittaker, Ron A. Webster	February 2, 1976	4:05

Side two
No.	Title	Writer(s)	Recording date	Length
1.	"For the Heart"	Dennis Linde	February 5, 1976	3:24
2.	"Bitter They Are, Harder They Fall"	Larry Gatlin	February 2, 1976	3:19
3.	"Solitaire"	Neil Sedaka, Phil Cody	February 3, 1976	4:42
4.	"Love Coming Down"	Jerry Chesnut	February 6, 1976	3:09
5.	"I'll Never Fall in Love Again"	Lonnie Donegan and Jimmy Currie	February 4, 1976	3:45

=== 2000 CD re-issue ===
Tracks 1–9: Moody Blue
No.	Title	Length
1.	"Unchained Melody"	2:32
2.	"If You Love Me (Let Me Know)"	2:59
3.	"Little Darlin'"	1:53
4.	"He'll Have to Go"	4:31
5.	"Way Down"	2:36
6.	"Pledging My Love"	2:49
7.	"Moody Blue"	2:49
8.	"She Thinks I Still Care"	3:50
9.	"It's Easy for You"	3:28

Tracks 10–19 : From Elvis Presley Boulevard, Memphis, Tennessee
No.	Title	Length
10.	"Hurt"	2:08
11.	"Never Again"	2:52
12.	"Blue Eyes Crying in the Rain"	3:40
13.	"Danny Boy"	3:57
14.	"The Last Farewell"	4:03
15.	"For the Heart"	3:21
16.	"Bitter They Are, Harder They Fall"	3:17
17.	"Solitaire"	4:41
18.	"Love Coming Down"	3:07
19.	"I'll Never Fall in Love Again"	3:44

=== 2012 Follow That Dream CD edition ===
Disc 1
No.	Title	Length
1.	"Hurt"
2.	"Never Again"
3.	"Blue Eyes Crying In The Rain"
4.	"Danny Boy"
5.	"The Last Farewell"
6.	"For The Heart"
7.	"Bitter They Are, Harder They Fall"
8.	"Solitaire"
9.	"Love Coming Down"
10.	"I'll Never Fall In Love Again"
11.	"Hurt" (takes 1, 2)
12.	"Never Again" (take 11)
13.	"Blue Eyes Crying In The Rain" (take 4)
14.	"Danny Boy" (take 9)
15.	"The Last Farewell" (take 3 + ending of take 2)
16.	"For The Heart" (take 1)
17.	"Bitter They Are, Harder They Fall" (take 6)
18.	"Solitaire" (take 3)
19.	"Love Coming Down" (take 3)
20.	"I'll Never Fall In Love Again" (takes 4, 5)
21.	"For The Heart" (takes 3B, 4B, 5B)
22.	"Hurt" (composite of takes 4)

Disc 2
No.	Title	Length
1.	"For The Heart" (takes 2, 3A)
2.	"Bitter They Are, Harder They Fall" (take 1)
3.	"I'll Never Fall In Love Again" (takes 1,3)
4.	"Hurt" (take 3)
5.	"The Last Farewell" (take 1)
6.	"The Last Farewell" (take 2)
7.	"Never Again" (takes 2,3)
8.	"For The Heart" (take 4A)
9.	"Danny Boy" (takes 6, 7)
10.	"Danny Boy" (take 8)
11.	"Love Coming Down" (take 4)
12.	"Blue Eyes In The Rain" (takes 1, 2)
13.	"Solitaire" (takes 5, 7)
14.	"Hurt" (takes 6, 5)
15.	"Bitter They Are, Harder They Fall" (takes 3–5)
16.	"For The Heart" (take 5A)
17.	"The Last Farewell" (take 4, master rough mix)
18.	"I'll Never Fall In Love Again" (master rough mix)
19.	"Never Again" (master remix)
20.	"Danny Boy" (master rough remix)

== Personnel ==
- Elvis Presley – lead vocals
- J.D. Sumner & The Stamps – background vocals
- Kathy Westmoreland – background vocals
- Myrna Smith – background vocals
- James Burton – lead guitar except “Blue Eyes Crying in the Rain”
- John Wilkinson – electric rhythm guitar
- Charlie Hodge – acoustic rhythm guitar
- Jerry Scheff – bass guitar except “Blue Eyes Crying in the Rain”
- Glen D. Hardin – piano except "Blue Eyes Crying in the Rain"
- David Briggs – Fender Rhodes electric piano except "Blue Eyes Crying in the Rain"; piano on "Blue Eyes Crying in the Rain"
- Ron Tutt – drums
- Billy Sanford – lead guitar on "Blue Eyes Crying in the Rain"
- Norbert Putnam – bass guitar on "Blue Eyes Crying in the Rain"
- Bobby Emmons – Fender Rhodes electric piano on "Blue Eyes Crying in the Rain"
- Bergen White – string and horn arrangements

Overdubbed

- Sherrill Nielsen – backing vocals
- Dolores Edgin – backing vocals
- Wendellyn Suits – backing vocals
- Hurschel Wiginton – backing vocals
- Chip Young – guitar
- Dennis Linde – bass
- Shane Keister – Moog synthesizer
- Farrell Morris – congas, timpani
- uncredited musicians – strings, horns

Technical

- Al Pachucki, Brian Christian, Ron Olson, Tom Brown, Tom Pick – engineer
- Larry Schnapf – director of engineering
- Roy Shockley – technician

== Charts ==
=== Weekly charts ===
Chart (1976)	Peak position
US Billboard 200	41
US Top Country Albums (Billboard)	1

=== Year-end charts ===
Chart (1976)	Position
US Top Country Albums (Billboard)	7

== Certifications ==
Region	Provider	Certification(s)
United States	RIAA	Gold
