= Elvis in Concert (album) =

Live album by Elvis Presley
- Released: October 3, 1977
- Recorded: June 19 & 21, 1977
- Venues: Omaha, Nebraska (June 19); Rapid City, South Dakota (June 21)
- Genre: Rock
- Length: 71:41
- Label: RCA Victor
- Producers: Felton Jarvis, Elvis Presley

Elvis Presley chronology
Moody Blue (1977)	Elvis in Concert (1977)	He Walks Beside Me (1978)

Singles from Elvis in Concert
- 1. "My Way" Released: 25 November 1977

Professional ratings
Review scores
Source	Rating
AllMusic	1/5 stars
MusicHound	1/5 stars
Rough Guides	3/5 stars

Elvis in Concert is the first posthumous album by Elvis Presley, released by RCA Records after his death in August 1977. Issued in conjunction with the television special of the same name, the album contains some of Presley's final live performances. Videotaped and recorded in June 1977,both the special and album were broadcast and released on October 3, 1977 (the single "My Way"/"America the Beautiful" was released the same day) six weeks after Presley's death. The album peaked at No. 5 on the Billboard chart in late 1977. It was certified Gold and Platinum on October 14 and 3× Platinum on August 1, 2002, by the RIAA.

== Background ==
The performances in the TV special were recorded over two days at concerts in Omaha on June 19 and Rapid City, South Dakota June 21, 1977. The recordings were produced by longtime RCA Victor/Elvis producer Felton Jarvis, according to Elvis: The Illustrated Record by Roy Carr and Mick Farren. Approximately half of the album's performances were overdubbed with additional vocals and instruments on August 29, 1977. This included a version of "Unchained Melody" which was different from the performance heard on the album Moody Blue. These overdubs were added after Elvis Presley's death but before the album's release and the broadcast of the related TV special. The "Unchained Melody" overdub was later released as a single in 1978.

Although both the June 19 and 21 concerts are the last official live performances of Presley professionally recorded by RCA Records, Vernon Presley, Presley's father, recorded a message that was broadcast at the end of the special (and included on the soundtrack album), in which he erroneously states that the special featured his son's last live appearance; in fact, Presley made five more concert appearances after the performances in the special. Presley's final concert was in fact on Sunday, June 26, 1977 at the Market Square Arena in Indianapolis.

== Content ==
During the special, Presley performs a selection of his hits, along with songs not normally associated with him. Although it was a regular part of his repertoire for years, Presley requires a lyric sheet when he performs Paul Anka's "My Way" (noted for its opening lyric, "And now the end is near/And so I face the final curtain"). He appears to lose his train of thought during "Are You Lonesome Tonight?", although some have made the case that Presley regularly played around with the words during the spoken portion of the song when performing it on stage, rather than it being a case of poor memory. Indeed, concert recordings of Presley experimenting with the lyrics during the monologue section of "Are You Lonesome Tonight?" date back to 1961 in Hawaii, later during rehearsals for his 1968 comeback special, and the iconic "laughing" version from Las Vegas in 1969. A 1969 version dubbed the "Laughing Version", even made the UK singles chart after Presley's death and continues to be reissued.

The soundtrack album was issued as a 2-record set, including a second disc of performances that were not included in the TV special. On May 22, 1992, the album was reissued on a single compact disc.

== Professional reviews ==
AllMusic gave the album a negative review, but conceded that "this album is not a standout Elvis concert. What it is, however, is a vitally important piece of Elvis lore." Their review went on to say that the record is "Elvis Presley's least effort, as well as his last."

== Track listing ==
=== Disc 1 ===
1. Elvis Fans Comments (Pt. 1)/Opening Riff
2. "Also Sprach Zarathustra"- June 21 1977
3. "See See Rider" - June 21 1977
4. "That's All Right" - June 21 1977
5. "Are You Lonesome Tonight?" - June 21 1977
6. "Teddy Bear"/"Don't Be Cruel" - June 19 1977
7. Elvis Fans Comments (Pt. 2)
8. "You Gave Me a Mountain" - June 21 1977
9. "Jailhouse Rock" - June 21 1977
10. Elvis Fans Comments (Pt. 3)
11. "How Great Thou Art" - June 19 1977
12. Elvis Fans Comments (Pt. 4)
13. "I Really Don't Want To Know" - June 21 1977
14. Elvis Introduces his Father
15. "Hurt" - June 21 1977
16. "Hound Dog" - June 21 1977
17. "My Way" - June 21 1977
18. "Can't Help Falling in Love" - June 19 1977
19. Closing Riff/Special Message from Elvis's Father - June 19 1977

=== Disc 2 ===
1. "I Got A Woman/Amen" - June 21 1977
2. Elvis Talks
3. "Love Me" - June 21 1977
4. "If You Love Me (Let Me Know)" - June 21 1977
5. "'O Sole Mio/It's Now or Never" - June 21 1977
6. "Trying to Get to You" - June 21 1977
7. "Hawaiian Wedding Song" - June 21 1977
8. "Fairytale" - June 19 1977
9. "Little Sister" - June 19 1977
10. "Early Morning Rain" - June 21 1977
11. "What'd I Say" - June 21 1977
12. "Johnny B. Goode" - June 21 1977
13. "And I Love You So" - June 19 1977

== Personnel ==
- Elvis Presley – vocals, acoustic guitar on "That's All Right" and "Are You Lonesome Tonight"
- James Burton – lead guitar
- John Wilkinson – rhythm guitar
- Charlie Hodge – acoustic guitar, vocals
- Jerry Scheff – bass guitar
- Ronnie Tutt – drums
- Tony Brown – piano
- Bobby Ogdin – electric piano, clavinet
- The Sweet Inspirations, The Stamps Quartet, Kathy Westmoreland, Sherrill Nielsen – vocals
- Joe Guercio – orchestra

== Chart performance ==
Chart (1977)	Peak position
U.S. Billboard Top Country Albums	1
U.S. Billboard 200	5
U.S. Cashbox	3
Australian Albums Chart	17
Canadian RPM Top Albums	4
Dutch Albums Charts	12
Top 20 New Zealand Album Chart	6
Norway Albums Top 40 Chart	12
Sweden Album Chart	12
UK Albums Chart	13

=== Certifications ===
Region	Provider	Certification(s)
Canada	CRIA	2× Platinum
United States	RIAA	3× Platinum
