= Hurt!!!!!!! =

Studio album by Timi Yuro
- Released: 1961
- Recorded: 1961
- Genre: Easy listening
- Label: Liberty

Timi Yuro chronology
Hurt!!!!!!! (1961)	Soul (1962)

Singles from Hurt!!!!!!!
- 1. "Hurt / I Apologize" Released: June 23, 1961

Hurt!!!!!!! is the debut album by American recording artist Timi Yuro. It peaked at #51 on the Billboard Top LPs chart in 1961. Its biggest hit was "Hurt", which peaked at No. 4 on the Billboard Hot 100.

== Track listing ==
Side one

1. "For You" – 2:30
2. "Cry" – 3:35
3. "You'll Never Know" – 3:10
4. "Trying" – 2:35
5. "Hurt" – 2:28
6. "I Won't Cry Anymore" – 2:28

Side two

1. "A Little Bird Told Me" – 2:28
2. "I Should Care" – 3:25
3. "Just Say I Love Him" – 2:55
4. "And That Reminds Me" – 2:35
5. "I'm Confessin' (That I Love You)" – 2:52
6. "I Apologize" – 2:50

== Charts ==
Chart (1961)	Peak position
US Billboard 200	51
