= Just Say I Love Her =

Song by Johnny Desmond
- B-side: "If Anybody Does"
- Released: 1950
- Genre: Traditional pop
- Length: 3:08
- Label: MGM
- Songwriters: Rodolfo Falvo, Jack Val, Jimmy Dale, Enzo Fusco, Martin Kalmanoff, Sam Ward

"Just Say I Love Her" ("Just Say I Love Him" when recorded by a female singer) is a popular song, adapted from the Neapolitan song "Dicitencello vuje". The original music was written by Neapolitan composer Rodolfo Falvo in 1930; and was arranged in the United States by Jack Val and Jimmy Dale; the original Neapolitan lyrics by Enzo Fusco, and English lyrics by Martin Kalmanoff and Sam Ward.

A recording by Johnny Desmond was made on January 20, 1950, and released by MGM (catalog number 10758). It reached No. 24 on the Billboard chart. Vic Damone's 1950 recording of the song reached No. 13 on the Billboard chart.

== Recorded versions ==
- Johnny Desmond (1950)
- Tony Bennett (1950)
- Vic Damone (1950)
- Artie Shaw with vocals by Don Cherry (1950)
- Eddie Fisher - Eddie Fisher Sings (1952)
- Lou Monte - Lou Monte Sings for You (1958)
- Connie Francis - for her album More Italian Favorites (1960).
- Timi Yuro - Hurt!!!!!!! (1961).
- Frankie Avalon - on his album Italiano (1962)
- Sumo
- Robert Goulet - My Love Forgive Me (1964).
- Dean Martin - for his album Dino: Italian Love Songs (1962)
- Al Martino - The Exciting Voice of Al Martino (1962).
- Cliff Richard - When in Rome (1965)
- Nina Simone on the 1961 album Forbidden Fruit, and the 1993 album A Single Woman
- Jerry Vale - I Have But One Heart (1962).
- Steve Lawrence - Sings of Love and Sad Young Men (1967).
- Caterina Valente - covered as part of Italian Medley on Live 1968
- Engelbert Humperdinck - We Made It Happen (1970).
- Jimmy Roselli - Life and Love Italian Style (1965)
- Tito Schipa
- Giuseppe di Stefano
- Luciano Pavarotti
- Dmitri Hvorostovsky - Passione di Napoli (2001)
- Nicolae Herlea – Recital De Canțonete.
- Xiu Xiu - Nina (2013).
- Christian Ketter – Beloved: Live in Recital (2014).
- Franco Corelli
- Sergio Franchi covered this Neapolitan favorite on his 1963 Billboard Top 200 (at 66th place) album Our Man from Italy; also on his 1965 album Live From The Cocoanut Grove; and on his 1976 album 20 Magnificent Songs. He recorded it in Italian, and in Italian/English combination.
