= Welcome to My World (Elvis Presley album) =

Compilation album by Elvis Presley
- Released: March 17, 1977
- Recorded: 1958 ("Your Cheatin' Heart"), 1969–1973
- Genre: Country; pop; rock
- Length: 27:32
- Label: RCA Victor

Elvis Presley chronology
From Elvis Presley Boulevard, Memphis, Tennessee (1976)	Welcome to My World (1977)	Moody Blue (1977)

Welcome to My World is a compilation album by American singer and musician Elvis Presley, released by RCA Records on March 17, 1977, five months before his death. The album was certified gold on September 30, 1977, and platinum on January 14, 1983, by the RIAA.

== Content ==
Due to Elvis' infrequent studio recording sessions during this period and thus lacking any new material from Elvis, RCA Records assembled this album, consisting of, with one exception, all previously released tracks. "Your Cheatin' Heart" was the oldest track, recorded in 1958, nineteen years earlier. The one previously unissued track, "I Can't Stop Loving You", was recorded during the afternoon performance at Madison Square Garden on June 10, 1972; the remainder of the concert remained unreleased until 1997 when RCA issued the complete concert as An Afternoon in the Garden.

Professional ratings
Review scores
Source	Rating
Allmusic	link

== Track listing ==
Side one
No.	Title	Writer(s)	Recording date	Length
1.	"Welcome to My World (live)"	Ray Winkler, John Hathcock	January 14, 1973	1:57
2.	"Help Me Make It Through the Night"	Kris Kristofferson	May 17–21, 1971	2:45
3.	"Release Me (And Let Me Love Again)" (live)	Dub Williams (Eddie Miller, Robert Yount, James Pebworth)	February 18, 1970	2:56
4.	"I Really Don't Want to Know"	Don Robertson and Howard Barnes	June 6–8, 1970	2:44
5.	"For the Good Times" (live)	Kris Kristofferson	June 10, 1972	3:07

Side two
No.	Title	Writer(s)	Recording date	Length
1.	"Make the World Go Away"	Hank Cochran	June 6–8, 1970	3:33
2.	"Gentle on My Mind"	John Hartford	January 14, 1969	3:21
3.	"I'm So Lonesome I Could Cry" (live)	Hank Williams	January 14, 1973	2:01
4.	"Your Cheatin' Heart"	Hank Williams	February 1, 1958	2:26
5.	"I Can't Stop Loving You" (live; previously unreleased)	Don Gibson	June 10, 1972	2:22

== Certifications ==
Region	Provider	Certification(s)
United States	RIAA	Platinum
