= Moody Blue (song) =

Single by Elvis Presley

from the album Moody Blue
- B-side: "She Thinks I Still Care"
- Released: 29 November 1976 (single); June 1977 (Moody Blue album)
- Recorded: February 4, 1976
- Studio: Graceland, Memphis, Tennessee
- Length: 2:53
- Label: RCA Records
- Songwriter: Mark James
- Producer: Felton Jarvis

Elvis Presley singles chronology
"Hurt" (1976)	"Moody Blue" (1976)	"Way Down" (1977)

Blue vinyl pressing
- US Limited release edition

"Moody Blue" is a song recorded by Elvis Presley. The song was written and originally recorded by Mark James in 1975 on the Mercury label, with the B side "Wrong Kind Of Love". James previously penned Presley's "Suspicious Minds" and other songs.

"Moody Blue" was recorded by Presley in February 1976 in the Jungle Room of his Graceland home and released as a single that November; it was Presley's last No. 1 hit in his lifetime. It topped the Billboard magazine Hot Country Singles chart in February 1977 and peaked at number 31 on the Billboard Hot 100 in March. RCA Records issued an extremely limited quantity of the "Moody Blue" single in a translucent blue vinyl, with "She Thinks I Still Care" as the B-side. Six months after "Moody Blue" topped the Country chart, Presley was dead.

Presley's only performance of the song in its entirety was on February 21, 1977, at a concert in Charlotte, North Carolina; he had sung a portion during the show the night before.

Both the February 20th false start and the February 21st concerts had soundboard recordings made that included the song. The recordings were released on compact disc in 2007 by the Follow That Dream label and in 1995 by Fort Baxter, respectively; audience recordings and still photos of both performances also exist.

== Chart performance ==
=== Weekly charts ===
Chart (1976–77)	Peak position
Australia (Kent Music Report)	17
Canadian RPM Top Singles	57
Canadian RPM Country Tracks	3
Canadian RPM Adult Contemporary	2
Ireland (IRMA)	7
New Zealand (RIANZ)	5
South Africa (Springbok Radio)	9
UK Singles Chart	6
US Billboard Hot 100	31
US Billboard Hot Country Singles	1
US Billboard Easy Listening	2

=== Year-end charts ===
Chart (1977)	Rank
Australia KMR	47
U.S. Billboard Adult Contemporary	41
New Zealand	26
