= It's Easy for You =

1977 song by Elvis Presley

"It's Easy For You"

Song by Elvis Presley

from the album Moody Blue
- Released: July 19, 1977
- Recorded: October 29, 1976
- Length: 3:28
- Songwriter(s): Andrew Lloyd Webber and Tim Rice
- Producer(s): Felton Jarvis

"It's Easy for You" is a song by American musician Elvis Presley, released in 1977 by RCA Records as the final track on his final studio album, Moody Blue. It was written by Andrew Lloyd Webber and Tim Rice and produced by Felton Jarvis.

It was recorded in the 'Jungle Room' of Presley's Graceland mansion.
