= Way Down =

Single by Elvis Presley

from the album Moody Blue
- B-side: "Pledging My Love"
- Released: June 6, 1977
- Recorded: October 29, 1976
- Studio: Graceland, Memphis, Tennessee
- Genre: Rock
- Length: 2:39
- Label: RCA Records
- Songwriter: Layng Martine Jr.
- Producer: Felton Jarvis

Elvis Presley singles chronology
"Moody Blue" / "She Thinks I Still Care" (1976)	"Way Down" (1977)	"My Way" (1977)

Music video
- "Way Down" (audio) on YouTube

"Way Down" is a song recorded by Elvis Presley. Recorded in October 1976, it was his last single released before his death on August 16, 1977. The song was written by Layng Martine Jr. and recorded by Presley at his home studio in Graceland on 29 October 1976.

Released as the second single from Moody Blue (with "Pledging My Love" on the B-side) on June 6, 1977, it was his latest single at the time of his death. It initially peaked at No. 31 on the Billboard Hot 100 chart dated August 6, 1977 and had fallen to No. 53 on the chart for the week ending August 27, 1977. Thereafter, it reversed direction and reached an even higher peak at No. 18 on 24 September – 1 October 1977. "Way Down" reached No. 1 on the American Country chart the week he died. The single was certified platinum in the U.S. by the RIAA in 1999.

On the UK Singles Chart, after having climbed only four places to number 42 the week before Presley's death, the track rose to number four the following week and then hit number one in the week ending 3 September and stayed there for five weeks, just over seven years after his previous 16th UK number one single, "The Wonder of You", in August 1970. His previous single, "Moody Blue", had been a number one hit on the US Country charts earlier in 1977. "Way Down" was reissued in April 2005 and reached No. 2 on the UK Singles Chart.

The recording also featured J.D. Sumner singing the words "way on down" at the end of each chorus down to the note low C (C2). At the end of the song, this phrase is octaved, reaching a double low C (C1, three octaves below middle C). This note was first accomplished by Sumner in a 1966 recording of the hymn "Blessed Assurance".

== Chart performance ==
=== Weekly charts ===
Chart (1977)	Peak position
Canadian RPM Country Tracks	1
Canadian RPM Top Singles	15
Canadian RPM Adult Contemporary Tracks	5
Irish Singles Chart	1
UK Singles Chart	1
US Billboard Hot 100	18
US Adult Contemporary (Billboard)	14
US Hot Country Songs (Billboard)	1

=== Year-end charts ===
Chart (1977)	Position
Canada	44
US Hot Country Songs (Billboard)	5
US (Joel Whitburn's Pop Annual)	41

== See also ==
- List of posthumous number-one singles (UK)
