= Moody Blue =

Studio album by Elvis Presley
- Released: July 19, 1977
- Recorded: 20 March 1974, February 2 and 4, 1976; October 29 and 31, 1976; April 24 and 26, 1977
- Genres: Country; pop; rock
- Length: 31:35
- Label: RCA Victor
- Producer: Felton Jarvis

Elvis Presley chronology
Welcome to My World (1977)	Moody Blue (1977)	Elvis in Concert (1977)

Singles from Moody Blue
- 1. "Moody Blue" Released: November 29, 1976; 2. "Way Down" Released: June 6, 1977

Moody Blue is the twenty-fourth and final studio album by American singer and musician Elvis Presley, released on July 19, 1977, by RCA Records, four weeks before his death. The album was a mixture of studio recordings and live performances and included the four tracks from Presley's final studio sessions in October 1976 and two tracks left over from the previous Graceland session in February 1976. "Moody Blue" was a previously published hit song recorded at the earlier Graceland session and held over for this album. Also recorded at the February session was "She Thinks I Still Care". "Way Down" was released as a single on June 6, 1977, and peaked at No. 31 on the Billboard Hot 100 for the week ending August 6, then held that position for a second week on August 13, 1977, before falling out of the Top 40 on the chart for the week ending August 20, 1977. Following Presley's death, the song reentered the Top 40 and reached No. 18 on the chart for the week ending September 24, 1977, held that same position one week later, and then fell back down the charts again. The album was certified Gold and Platinum on September 12, 1977, and 2× Platinum on March 27, 1992, by the RIAA.

The first American copies of Moody Blue were pressed on limited edition translucent blue vinyl, the first time a Presley album had been issued on colored vinyl. The record was soon switched to black vinyl. Following Presley's death, the album was heavily in demand and repressed on blue vinyl, making the original American black vinyl issue the scarcer of the two. In the United States, the album was also available on white and yellow vinyl. All overseas pressings were on black vinyl, except for the first Argentinian and Canadian pressings that were pressed on blue translucent vinyl.

== Contents ==
As described in Elvis: The Illustrated Record, RCA was not able to obtain sufficient new studio material for a complete album, with all but two songs of Presley's studio recordings of 1976 having already been used in the previous album, From Elvis Presley Boulevard, Memphis, Tennessee, or released as singles. The company chose to use the contents of two singles that had not yet been included on an album, along with the two last remaining unreleased tracks from the Graceland sessions; the track list was then augmented with three live songs recorded in multi-track in Ann Arbor, Michigan, on April 24 and 26, 1977, which were heavily overdubbed for the album. One of these was his version of "Unchained Melody", on which he accompanied himself on the piano.

RCA producer Felton Jarvis had booked a recording studio in Nashville, Tennessee, for January 1977, to record some new tracks for this album. Presley had chosen a few songs to record with the help of Jarvis, most of them country and uptempo. Unfortunately, Presley never appeared for that session, claiming that he was ill and thus staying at home (an excuse that Presley used rather frequently during the 1960s to avoid recording poor soundtracks for his motion pictures). Additionally, Jarvis had tried to get Elvis to record the song "There's a Fire Down Below" (written by Presley's bassist Jerry Scheff of his TCB Band) during the October 1976 sessions, but succeeded only in getting the backing instrumental track recorded and was unable to get Elvis to record a vocal. Jarvis and RCA had nothing left to do but complete the album using the live tracks mentioned above. "Let Me Be There" which had already been issued only three years earlier on the album Elvis: As Recorded Live on Stage in Memphis and was still available at the time of this album's release was also included as RCA did not have any other new tracks to include besides live versions of previously released songs. They had a few new songs as live recordings but only as a poor quality soundboard recordings.

The song "Moody Blue" was released as a single in November 1976 and it reached number one on the Billboard Country Singles Chart and No. 31 on the pop chart. "Way Down" was released as the album's next single during the early summer of 1977. It did not go very far up the chart initially, but it soared to No. 18 after Presley's death in August (jumping to number one in the UK). It was a bigger hit on the country charts, and it had risen to number one in the same week of the death of Presley. This album reached number three on the Billboard album charts after his death, although it had already entered the top 40 before he died. This was the last album by Presley to reach the top 40. Moody Blue was also a number one album on the Country Albums chart. Moody Blue was issued in late June 1977, and it peaked on the album chart at No. 3 after Presley's death on August 16, 1977.

RCA initially pressed the album on blue vinyl in a limited edition, to match the title track. Colored vinyl pressings were relatively uncommon at the time and were seldom seen in a wide release; this has led many collectors to mistakenly believe that blue vinyl copies of Moody Blue are collector's items, when in fact, the true rarities are pressings from immediately before Presley's death on standard black vinyl. Immediately following his death, the production of Moody Blue was shifted back to blue vinyl. However, in later years the album was produced again using standard black vinyl.

After Presley's death, RCA issued "Unchained Melody" as a single and it peaked at No. 6 on the country music charts. This single version is a different recording from the track on the Moody Blue LP; the single was an overdubbed version of another live performance recorded in Rapid City, on June 21, 1977, during one of the two concerts that produced the album and television special, Elvis In Concert.

== Critical reception ==
Professional ratings
Review scores
Source	Rating
AllMusic	2/5 stars
Christgau's Record Guide	B−
MusicHound Rock	3/5 stars
The Rolling Stone Album Guide	3/5 stars
The Rough Guide to Elvis	3/5 stars

The Los Angeles Times concluded that "the voice is still intact, but the arrangements are often off-center and the material is often uninspired."

== CD reissues ==
RCA first reissued the original 10 track album on compact disc in 1988. In 2000, RCA reissued the album on CD again, with revised cover art including a different concert photo of Elvis and omitted the track "Let Me Be There", due to its presence on Elvis: As Recorded Live on Stage in Memphis, and added the complete album From Elvis Presley Boulevard, Memphis, Tennessee as tracks 10–19 – in effect compiling the Graceland sessions rather than reissuing the original album. In 2013, Moody Blue was reissued on the Follow That Dream label in a special edition that contained the original album tracks along with a selection of alternate takes.

== Track listing ==
=== Original release ===
Side A
No.	Title	Writer(s)	Recording date	Length
1.	"Unchained Melody" (recorded on tour)	Alex North, Hy Zaret	April 24, 1977	2:32
2.	"If You Love Me (Let Me Know)" (recorded on tour)	John Rostill	April 26, 1977	2:57
3.	"Little Darlin'" (recorded on tour)	Maurice Williams	April 24, 1977	1:52
4.	"He'll Have to Go" (recorded at Graceland)	Joe Allison, Audrey Allison	October 31, 1976	4:28
5.	"Let Me Be There" (from the album Elvis Recorded Live on Stage in Memphis)	John Rostill	March 20, 1974	3:26

Side B
No.	Title	Writer(s)	Recording date	Length
1.	"Way Down" (recorded at Graceland)	Layng Martine, Jr.	October 29, 1976	2:37
2.	"Pledging My Love" (recorded at Graceland)	Don Robey, Ferdinand Washington	October 29, 1976	2:50
3.	"Moody Blue" (recorded at Graceland)	Mark James	February 4, 1976	2:49
4.	"She Thinks I Still Care" (recorded at Graceland)	Dickey Lee, Steve Duffy	February 2, 1976	3:49
5.	"It's Easy for You" (recorded at Graceland)	Andrew Lloyd Webber, Tim Rice	October 29, 1976	3:26

=== Follow That Dream re-issue ===
Disc one
No.	Title	Length
1.	"Unchained Melody"	2:34
2.	"If You Love Me (Let Me Know)"	3:01
3.	"Little Darlin'" (live, April 24, 1977)	1:55
4.	"He'll Have to Go"	4:34
5.	"Let Me Be There"	3:37
6.	"Way Down"	2:41
7.	"Pledging My Love"	2:53
8.	"Moody Blue"	2:52
9.	"She Thinks I Still Care"	3:53
10.	"Its Easy for You"	3:30
11.	"Unchained Melody" (undubbed master)	3:17
12.	"If You Love Me (Let Me Know)" (undubbed master)	2:56
13.	"Moody Blue" (take 6)	4:06
14.	"She Thinks I Still Care" (take 2B)	4:42
15.	"My Way" (live)	4:21
16.	"Way Down" (undubbed master)	3:04
17.	"Little Darlin" (undubbed master)	2:02
18.	"He'll Have to Go" (rough mix)	4:37
19.	"Pledging My Love" (composite of rehearsal and take 3)	3:21
20.	"It's Easy for You" (take 1)	3:46
21.	"She Thinks I Still Care" (takes 1, 2A)	5:35
22.	"America, The Beautiful"	2:19
23.	"Softly, as I Leave You"	3:04

Disc two
No.	Title	Length
1.	"Way Down" (rehearsal, take 1)	3:15
2.	"Way Down" (take 2A)	2:54
3.	"She Thinks I Still Care" (takes 3, 4)	4:58
4.	"Moody Blue" (take 1)	3:30
5.	"Pledging My Love" (takes 1, 2)	2:38
6.	"Pledging My Love" (take 3)	4:53
7.	"It's Easy for You" (takes 3, 4)	1:56
8.	"It's Easy for You" (undubbed master)	3:40
9.	"She Thinks I Still Care" (takes 7, 9)	2:28
10.	"She Thinks I Still Care" (take 10)	4:21
11.	"Blue Eyes Crying in The Rain" (unedited rough mix of master)	4:23
12.	"Moody Blue" (takes 7, 5)	5:31
13.	"Bitter They Are, Harder They Fall" (rough mix of master)	3:29
14.	"Pledging My Love" (takes 4–5)	2:06
15.	"Pledging My Love" (undubbed, unedited master)	5:24
16.	"Way Down" (take 2B)	1:42
17.	"Way Down" (rough mix of master)	2:39
18.	"Moody Blue" (takes 8, 9)	1:04
19.	"Moody Blue" (master unedited rough mix)	3:57
20.	"She Thinks I Still Care" (take 15)	4:16
21.	"America, The Beautiful" (composite of single master and the surviving ending of the erased studio version)	2:16

== Personnel ==
Partial credits from Keith Flynn and Ernst Jorgensen's examination of session tapes, RCA paperwork, and AFM/musicians' union paperwork/contracts, except where noted.

- Elvis Presley – vocals, piano on "Unchained Melody", executive producer
- James Burton – lead guitar
- John Wilkinson – rhythm guitar
- Charlie Hodge – harmony and backing vocals, acoustic rhythm guitar
- Chip Young – guitars
- Jerry Scheff – bass except "Let Me Be There"
- Duke Bardwell – bass on "Let Me Be There"
- Tony Brown – piano except "Unchained Melody", "Let Me Be There", "Moody Blue", and "She Thinks I Still Care"; overdubbed organ on "Unchained Melody"
- Glen D. Hardin – piano on "Let Me Be There", "Moody Blue", and "She Thinks I Still Care"
- David Briggs – Fender Rhodes electric piano, clavinet, overdubbed piano on "Unchained Melody", "If You Love Me (Let Me Know)", "Way Down" and "Little Darlin’"
- Ronnie Tutt – drums
- The Sweet Inspirations (Myrna Smith, Estelle Brown, Sylvia Shemwell) – backing vocals
- Sherrill Nielsen – backing vocals
- Kathy Westmoreland – backing vocals
- J.D. Sumner & The Stamps (Bill Baize, Ed Enoch, Ed Hill, Larry Strickland) – backing vocals
- Voice – backing vocals
  - Sherrill Nielsen – backing vocals
  - Per-Erik "Pete" Hallin – backing vocals on "Let Me Be There"
- Bergen White – string and horn arrangements, orchestral overdub conductor
- Joe Guercio – orchestra conductor ("Unchained Melody", "If You Love Me (Let Me Know)", "Little Darlin’", and "Let Me Be There")
- Joe Guercio Orchestra – orchestra on "Unchained Melody", "If You Love Me (Let Me Know)", "Little Darlin’", and "Let Me Be There"

Overdubbed

- Bobby Ogdin – acoustic piano on "Unchained Melody" and "Little Darlin'"
- Norbert Putnam – bass on "Unchained Melody"
- Alan Rush – guitar on "Unchained Melody", "If You Love Me (Let Me Know)" and "Little Darlin’", backing vocals on "Little Darlin’"
- Dennis Linde – bass on “Unchained Melody”, “If You Love Me (Let Me Know)”, “Little Darlin’”, and "Moody Blue"; backing vocals on “Little Darlin’”
- Randy Cullers – drums on "Unchained Melody", "If You Love Me (Let Me Know)" and "Little Darlin’"
- Farrell Morris – percussion and bells on "Unchained Melody"; congas and timpani on "Moody Blue"
- Shane Keister – Moog synthesizers on "Moody Blue"
- Sheldon Kurland, Lennie Haight, George Binkley III, Brenton Banks, Carl J. Gorodetzky, Martin Katahn, Lawrence M. Hertzberg, Steven M. Smith, Samuel Terranova, Donald Teal Jr., Pamela Sixfin, Lisa Silver – violins on "Moody Blue" and "She Thinks I Still Care"
- Marvin Chantry, Gary Vanosdale, Virginia Christiensen, Kathy Plummer – violas on "Moody Blue" and "She Thinks I Still Care"
- Roy Christiensen, Martha McCrory – cellos on "Moody Blue" and "She Thinks I Still Care"
- Cindy Reynolds – harp on "Moody Blue" and "She Thinks I Still Care"
- Eberhard Ramm, David Elliott – French horns on "Moody Blue" and "She Thinks I Still Care"
- Dennis A. Good – trombone on "Moody Blue" and "She Thinks I Still Care"
- Bobby G. Taylor – oboe and/or English horn on "Moody Blue" and "She Thinks I Still Care"

Production and technical staff

- Felton Jarvis – producer
- Brian Christian – engineer ("Moody Blue", "She Thinks I Still Care")
- Al Pachucki – engineer ("Moody Blue" and "She Thinks I Still Care" overdub sessions)
- Sheldon Kurland – overdub session contractor ("Moody Blue" and "She Thinks I Still Care" overdub sessions)
- Joe Layne – string and horn arrangement copyist ("Moody Blue" and "She Thinks I Still Care" overdub sessions)
- Don Wardell – executive producer, producer (reissue)
- Chick Crumpacker – producer (reissue)
- Dick Baxter – engineer
- Glenn Meadows – original mastering
- Vic Anesini – digital remastering

== Charts ==
=== Weekly charts ===
Chart (1977–78)	Peak position
Australian Albums (Kent Music Report)	3
Austrian Albums (Ö3 Austria)	20
Canada Top Albums/CDs (RPM)	2
Dutch Albums (Album Top 100)	3
German Albums (Offizielle Top 100)	19
New Zealand Albums (RMNZ)	1
Norwegian Albums (VG-lista)	3
Swedish Albums (Sverigetopplistan)	2
UK Albums (Official Charts)	3
US Billboard 200	3
US Top Country Albums (Billboard)	1

=== Year-end charts ===
Chart (1977)	Position
Australian Albums (Kent Music Report)	25
Canada Top Albums/CDs (RPM)	24
Dutch Albums (Album Top 100)	32
New Zealand Albums (RMNZ)	15
UK Albums (OCC)	33

== Certifications and sales ==
Region	Certification	Certified units/sales
Canada (Music Canada)	2× Platinum	200,000^{^}
France (SNEP)	Gold	100,000^{*}
New Zealand Sales in 1977	—	7,500
United Kingdom (BPI)	Silver	60,000^{‡}
United States (RIAA)	2× Platinum	2,000,000^{^}
^{*} Sales figures based on certification alone.^{^} Shipments figures based on certification alone.^{‡} Sales+streaming figures based on certification alone.
