= Toof Building =

- U.S. National Register of Historic Places
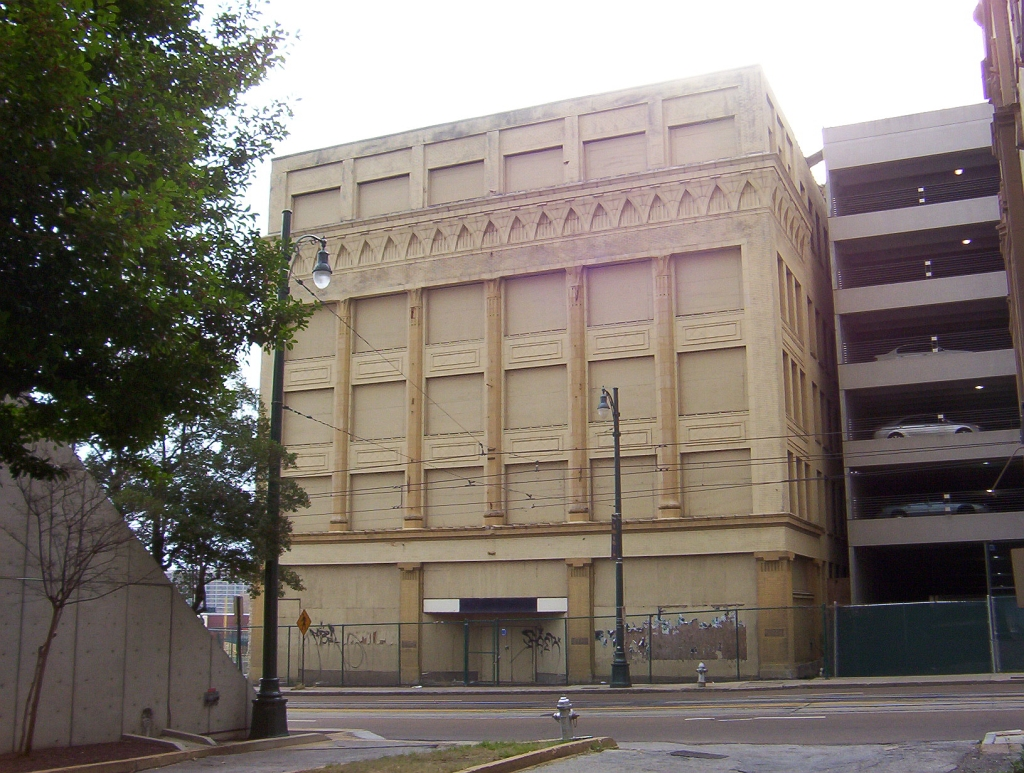
- Toof Building in 2008

- Location within Tennessee Location within the United States
- Location: 195 Madison Ave., Memphis, Tennessee
- Coordinates: 35°8′37″N 90°2′58″W
- Area: less than one acre
- Built: 1913
- Architect: G. M. Shaw
- Architectural style: Chicago School
- NRHP reference No.: 82004057
- Added to NRHP: August 26, 1982

The Toof Building is a commercial brick structure with exterior terra cotta elements, built in the architectural style of the Chicago School. It is located on Madison Ave in downtown Memphis, Tennessee, adjacent to AutoZone Park, a minor league baseball stadium.

Architect G. M. Shaw designed the structure for S. C. Toof & Co., the oldest printing company in Memphis, it was built in 1913 to serve as a production and administrative facility for the company. On six stories, the building offers 53,667 square feet (4,986 m^{2}) of production and office space.

In 2008, the building was vacant. In 2014, construction began on the building for the creation of The Press Box Lofts. The first residents moved in November, 2014.

== History ==
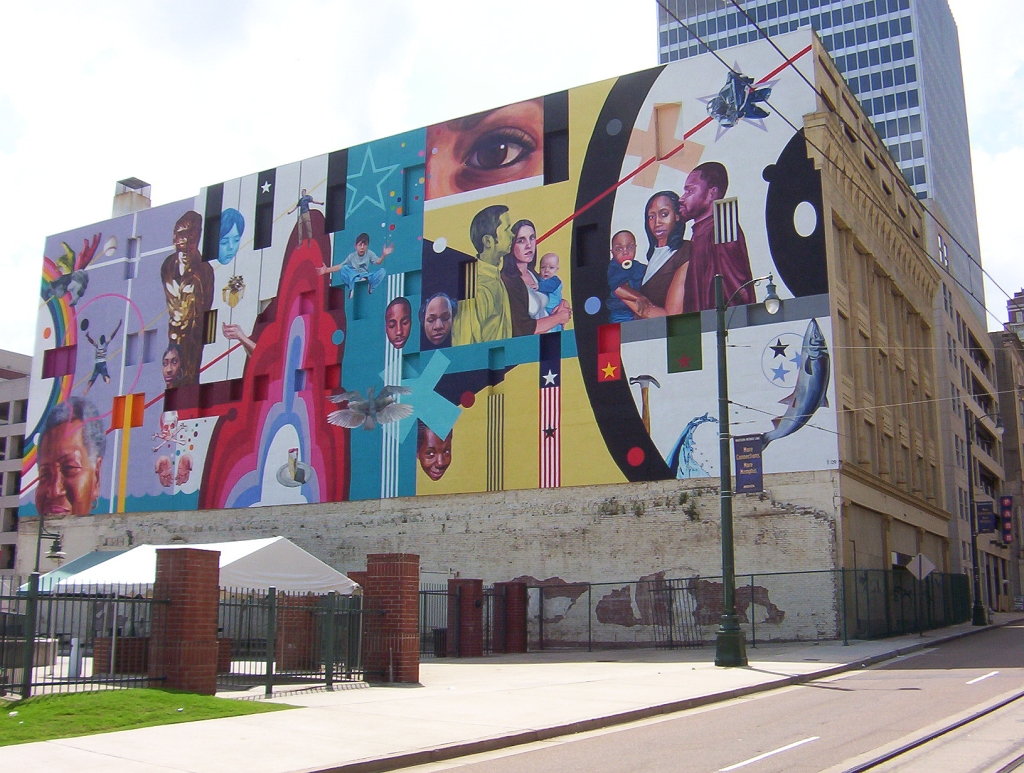
Mural on the eastern side of the building (2009)

The S. C. Toof & Co. printing business was founded in 1864. To accommodate for the expanding business after the turn of the 20th century, the Toof Building was planned by architect G. M. Shaw to serve as the new production and administrative site for the company in downtown Memphis. The building was designed in the architectural style of the Chicago School. The Chicago School utilized new technologies of steel-frame construction with masonry cladding and plate-glass window areas. Focusing on the function of the building rather than its appearance, the style also limited the amounts of ornament on the exterior. Construction of the building was completed in 1913. S. C. Toof & Co. is the oldest printing company in the Memphis area and is still in existence in 2008 under the name Toof Commercial Printing Co., with a business address on S Cooper St in Memphis.

In 1982, the building was added to the National Register of Historic Places.

The Toof Building is located west of and adjacent to AutoZone Park, a minor league baseball stadium and home of the Memphis Redbirds. In the mid-1990s, plans emerged to establish a minor league baseball museum in the vacant building. Lack of financial support for the museum let the supporters abandon the plans. The privately owned structure is still vacant in 2008, windows and doors are boarded.

Since August 2008, the eastern side of the building, facing the AutoZone Park baseball stadium, was prepared for a large-scale mural. The mural was completed in April 2009.

== See also ==
- Chicago School (architecture)
- National Register of Historic Places listings in Shelby County, Tennessee
