= Timi Yuro =

American singer (1940–2004)

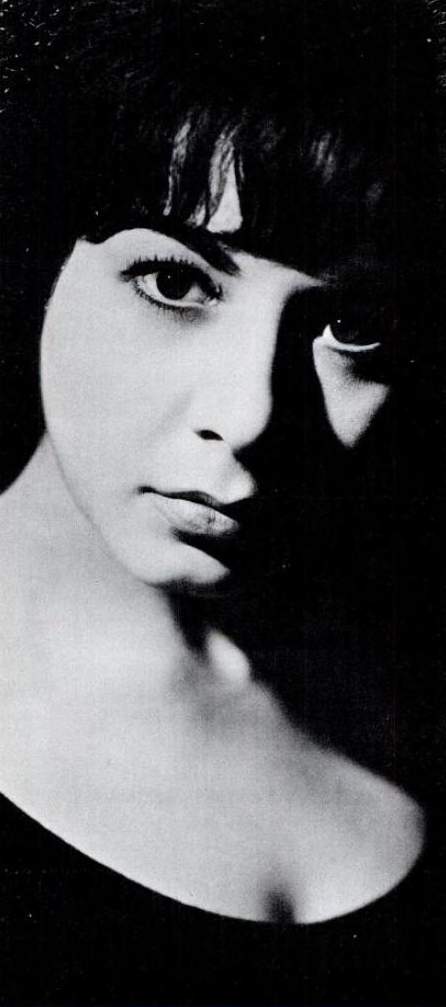
- Timi Yuro in 1963

Background information
- Born: Rosemary Victoria Yuro; August 4, 1941; Chicago, Illinois, U.S.
- Origin: Los Angeles, California, U.S.
- Died: March 30, 2004 (aged 62) Las Vegas, Nevada, U.S.
- Genres: Blue-eyed soul, R&B
- Occupation: Singer
- Years active: 1950s–1969, 1981–1990s
- Labels: Liberty, Mercury

Rosemary Victoria Yuro (August 4, 1941 – March 30, 2004), known professionally as Timi Yuro, was an American singer. Sometimes called "the little girl with the big voice", she is considered to be one of the first blue-eyed soul stylists of the rock era. Yuro possessed a contralto vocal range. According to one critic, "her deep, strident, almost masculine voice, staggered delivery and the occasional sob created a compelling musical presence".

== Early years ==
Yuro was born in Chicago, Illinois, on August 4, 1941, into an Italian-American family whose original name may have been Aurro. By the time of her birth, however, the family used the spelling Yuro. In 1952, young Rosemary moved with her family to Los Angeles, where she sang in her parents' Italian restaurant and, despite their opposition, in local nightclubs before catching the eye and ear of talent scout Sonny Knight.

== Career ==
Signed to Liberty Records in 1959, she had a U.S. Billboard No. 4 single in 1961 with "Hurt", an R&B ballad that had been an early success for Roy Hamilton. Yuro's recording was produced by Clyde Otis, who had previously worked with Brook Benton and Dinah Washington. Later that year she recorded as a duo with Johnnie Ray. She charted some further minor hits including "Smile" (No. 42), opened for Frank Sinatra on his 1962 tour of Australia, and received a 1962 Grammy nomination for Best New Artist of 1961 (losing to Peter Nero).

In 1962, Bob Johnston and Otis produced Yuro's single "What's a Matter Baby (Is It Hurting You?)", which went to No. 12 on the Billboard pop chart. On both "Hurt" and "What's a Matter Baby", Yuro showed an emotional but elegant vocal style that owed a debt to Washington and other black jazz singers. Many listeners in the early 1960s thought Yuro was black. Her single "The Love of a Boy" reached No. 44 in 1962. It was arranged and co-written by Burt Bacharach, but Yuro refused to record his suggested follow-up, "What the World Needs Now Is Love".

In the following year, Liberty released Make the World Go Away, an album of country and blues standards. The singer at her vocal peak, this recording includes the hit title song (later a bigger hit for Eddy Arnold, with whom the song is usually associated), a version of Willie Nelson's "Permanently Lonely", and two different blues takes of "I'm Movin' On". Yuro was also known for soulful reworkings of popular American standards, such as "Let Me Call You Sweetheart", "Smile", and "I Apologize". She toured Europe in 1963, and appeared on the British TV show Ready Steady Go!. However, in the U.S. her image became established as a cabaret performer, rather than as a soul singer.

By 1964, Yuro had moved to Mercury Records, but her first record for the label, "You Can Have Him", arranged by Jack Nitzsche, only just scraped into the chart and was her last hit. Nevertheless, her album The Amazing Timi Yuro, produced by Quincy Jones, was an artistic success. According to one critic, "her deep, strident, almost masculine voice, staggered delivery and the occasional sob created a compelling musical presence".

Subsequent records were unsuccessful, although a B-side, "Can't Stop Running Away", was later popular on the UK's Northern soul circuit. In the 1960s, Yuro made two TV appearances on The Ed Sullivan Show and was a guest on American Bandstand, Where the Action Is, and The Lloyd Thaxton Show. In 1967, she appeared in a black-and-white film in the Philippines as a guest star alongside Filipino comedians Dolphy and Panchito in a comedy titled Buhay Marino ("Life of a Sailor"), a film released by Wag-Wag Productions, Inc. Prior to that, Yuro also appeared as a guest on the Student Canteen TV program hosted by Leila Benitez of CBN (now ABS-CBN) in Aduana, Manila, and afterwards, did a singing concert at the Araneta Coliseum (now Smart Araneta Coliseum). At that time, the singer was very popular in the Philippines. She re-signed for Liberty Records in 1968, and recorded in London.

By the late 1960s, Yuro had performed in venues from London to Las Vegas. She appeared at the Kray twins' clubs in London as she was a favorite of Reggie Kray. In 1965 and 1968, she sang at the Sanremo Music Festival, Italy's most popular music contest. However, her career lost its early momentum and she quit the music business altogether after her marriage in 1969.

=== Later career ===
In 1981, Yuro attempted a comeback in the Netherlands, performing as a guest of honor on Dutch national television. She re-recorded a version of "Hurt" that reached No. 5 on the Dutch pop charts. She also signed to the Dutch record label Dureco to record a new album, All Alone Am I; it went to No. 1 on the Dutch album charts and was eventually certified as a gold record. With these successes, Yuro moved to the Netherlands and continued with a string of hit singles and albums. After her record sales began to decline there in the mid-1980s, Yuro returned to the United States. Her last recording was the vinyl album Today, which was released in 1982 by Ariola and produced by her old friend and collaborator Willie Nelson. In 1990, the disc was reissued as a CD, remastered and remixed by Yuro herself on her own label Timi and titled Timi Yuro Sings Willie Nelson.

== Illness and death ==
She was diagnosed with throat cancer in the 1990s, and died at the age of 62 in 2004 in Las Vegas, Nevada.

== Influence ==
Yuro's work is admired in the United States as well as the United Kingdom and the Netherlands. According to the obituary in the Las Vegas Sun, her hometown paper, Yuro's most famous fan was probably Elvis Presley, who commanded his own table at the casino where Yuro headlined in the late 1960s. (Presley had a top 10 country hit and top 30 pop hit with his 1976 version of "Hurt".) In April 2004, Morrissey announced Yuro's death on his official website, describing her as his "favorite singer". (Morrissey also recorded a version of Yuro's "Interlude" with Siouxsie Sioux in 1994.) P. J. Proby knew Yuro from their time in Hollywood, and often mentions it during his performances of "Hurt".

Elkie Brooks recorded a version of Yuro's classic "What's a Matter Baby" on her 1988 album Bookbinder's Kid. Yuro was so impressed with the version, she contacted Brooks while she was on a UK tour, and the two kept in contact.

Yuro found success on the dance floors of northern England in the 1970s and 1980s when Northern soul DJs championed her tracks, "It'll Never Be Over for Me" and "What's a Matter Baby". The former has remained an important Northern soul track; the latter was covered by The Small Faces as the B-side of their debut single in 1965 and re-released on Kent Records in the 1980s.

Yuro's 1962 recording of "Satan Never Sleeps" is the theme song that plays over the opening credits of the 1962 film of the same name. It also plays over the closing credits of Penny Lane's 2019 documentary film Hail Satan? and season 1, episode 5, of It: Welcome to Derry.

== Discography ==
=== Albums ===
- Hurt!!!!!!! (Liberty Records 7208, 1961)
- Soul (Liberty Records 7212, 1962)
- Let Me Call You Sweetheart (Liberty Records 7234, 1962)
- What's a Matter Baby (Liberty Records 7263, 1963)
- The Best of Timi Yuro (Liberty Records 7286, 1963)
- Make the World Go Away (Liberty Records 7319, 1963)
- The Amazing Timi Yuro (Mercury Records 60963, 1964)
- Timi Yuro (Sunset Records 5107, 1966)
- Something Bad on My Mind (Liberty Records 7594, 1968)
- Live at PJ's (Liberty Records, 1969)
- The Very Best of Timi Yuro (Liberty Records LBR 1034) 1980
- All Alone Am I (Dureco Benelux 77.011, 1981)
- I'm Yours (Arcade, 1982)
- Today (Ariola, 1982)

=== CD collections ===
- Hurt! The Best of Timi Yuro (Liberty Records, 1963 /EMI Records, 1992)
- Timi Yuro – 18 Heartbreaking Songs (Intermusic, 1993 – RMB 75061)
- Timi Yuro: The Lost Voice of Soul (RPM Records, 1993 – RPM-117)
- Timi Yuro: The Voice That Got Away (RPM Records, 1996 – RPM-167)
- The Amazing Timi Yuro: The Mercury Years (Spectrum Music – Universal International (UK), 2005 – 982-596-5)
- Timi Yuro: The Complete Liberty Singles (Real Gone Music, 2012 – RGM-0066)
- Timi Yuro: I'm a Star Now Rarities 1956–1982 (RPM RECORDS, 2014 – RPM-955)
- Timi Yuro: Hurt!/Live at PJs (Liberty Bell, 1986 – LST-7208, Italy, 2 lps on 1 cd)
- Timi Yuro: Something Bad on My Mind/The Unreleased Liberty Collection(Morello Records, 2015 – MRLLX-50)

=== Singles ===
Year	Song	Chart positions		
Year	Song	US	US AC	US R&B
1961	"Hurt"	4	2	22
1961	"I Apologize"	72	19	—
1961	"Smile"	42	9	—
1961	"She Really Loves You"	93	—	—
1961	"I Believe" (with Johnnie Ray)	—	—	—
1962	"Let Me Call You Sweetheart"	66	15	—
1962	"I Know (I Love You)"	—	—	—
1962	"What's a Matter Baby (Is It Hurting You)"	12	—	16
1962	"The Love of a Boy"	44	—	—
1963	"Insult to Injury"	81	—	—
1963	"Make the World Go Away"	24	8	—
1963	"Gotta Travel On"	64	—	—
1964	"Permanently Lonely"	130	—	—
1964	"Call Me"	—	—	—
1964	"A Legend in My Time"	—	—	—
1964	"I'm Movin' On"	—	—	—
1964	"If"	120	—	—
1964	"I Got It Bad (And That Ain't Good)"	—	—	—
1965	"You Can Have Him"	96	—	—
1965	"I Can't Stop Running Away"	—	—	—
1965	"Big Mistake"	—	—	—
1965	"E Poi Verrà L'Autunno / Ti Credo"	—	—	—
1966	"Once a Day"	118	—	—
1966	"Don't Keep Me Lonely Too Long"	—	—	—
1966	"Turn the World Around the Other Way"	—	37	—
1967	"Why Not Now"	—	—	—
1969	"It'll Never Be Over for Me"	—	—	—
1975	"Southern Lady"	108	—	—
