= Hurt (Roy Hamilton song) =

1954 single by Roy Hamilton

Single by Roy Hamilton
- B-side: "Star of Love"
- Released: 1954
- Genre: R&B
- Label: Epic 9086
- Songwriters: Jimmie Crane; Al Jacobs

Roy Hamilton singles chronology
"Ebb Tide" (1954)	"Hurt" (1954)	"Unchained Melody" (1955)

"Hurt" is a 1954 song by Jimmie Crane and Al Jacobs. "Hurt" was originally performed by Roy Hamilton, whose version peaked at number eight on the R&B Best Seller chart and spent a total of seven weeks on the chart. A version by Ricky Denell also received considerable radio airplay in 1954 on pop radio stations. The song is considered to be the signature hit of Timi Yuro, whose version went to number four on the Billboard pop chart in 1961. Elvis Presley’s 1976 version reached the top 40 on the Billboard Hot 100 and the top 10 on Billboard’s Hot Country Singles chart. Juice Newton's 1985 version scored number one on Billboard's Country chart.

"Hurt"

Single by Timi Yuro
- B-side: "I Apologize"
- Released: 1961
- Recorded: 1961
- Genre: Blue-eyed soul
- Label: Liberty
- Songwriters: Jimmie Crane, Al Jacobs
- Producer: Clyde Otis

"Hurt"

Single by Elvis Presley

from the album From Elvis Presley Boulevard, Memphis, Tennessee
- A-side: "For the Heart"
- Released: March 12, 1976
- Recorded: February 5, 1976
- Studio: Graceland, Memphis, TN
- Genre: Country, pop
- Label: RCA Records
- Songwriters: Jimmie Crane, Al Jacobs
- Producer: Felton Jarvis

Elvis Presley singles chronology
"Bringing It Back" / ""Pieces of My Life"" (1975)	"For the Heart" / "Hurt" (1976)	"Moody Blue" (1976)

== Cover versions ==
"Hurt"

Single by Juice Newton

from the album Old Flame
- B-side: "Eye of a Hurricane"
- Released: November 1985
- Recorded: August 1985
- Genre: Country
- Label: RCA 14199
- Songwriters: Jimmie Crane, Al Jacobs
- Producer: Richard Landis

Juice Newton singles chronology
"You Make Me Want to Make You Mine" (1985)	"Hurt" (1985)	"Old Flame" (1986)

- In 1961, Timi Yuro's version of "Hurt" reached No. 4 on the Billboard Hot 100, while reaching No. 2 on Billboard's Easy Listening chart and No. 22 on the R&B chart.
- In 1964, Little Anthony and the Imperials recorded a version on their album, "Goin' Out Of My Head". This version was a chart hit, reaching No. 51 on the Billboard Hot 100, two years later (1966).
- In 1967, Dalida - A qui? (Hurt).
- In 1967, the Italian singer Fausto Leali had a personal triumph with a local version entitled "A chi" ("To whom"), which was the top record of the year in Italy.
- In 1973, Bobby Vinton released a version of "Hurt". Vinton's version reached No. 1 in Flemish Belgium, while reaching No. 3 in the Netherlands, and No. 40 on Billboard's Easy Listening chart. The song appeared in 1974 on his album With Love.
- In 1976, Elvis Presley covered the song. It was a single & featured on his album From Elvis Presley Boulevard, Memphis, Tennessee. Presley's version reached No. 28 on the Billboard Hot 100, while reaching No. 7 on Billboard's Easy Listening chart, No. 6 on Billboard's Hot Country Singles chart, and No. 37 on the UK Singles Chart. Rock critic Greil Marcus described his performance as "apocalyptic", while fellow reviewer Dave Marsh said "If he felt the way he sounded, the wonder isn't that he had only a year left to live but that he managed to survive that long." -Presley sang the song on stage 159 times, usually performing it with a reprise. In four of these instances, in Birmingham, Alabama (December 29 1976); Atlanta (December 30 1976), Pittsburgh (December 31 1976); and Chicago (May 1 1977), he ended it by going to the floor intentionally while simultaneously delivering a seven-second uninterrupted note.
- In 1976, the song was covered in Malay by Black Dog Bone as "Luka".
- In 1976, The Manhattans covered the song on their album The Manhattans. Their version reached No. 10 on Billboard's R&B chart, and No. 4 on the UK Singles Chart.
- In 1981, Carly Simon covered the song on her Torch album; it was the record's only single. Record World praised "Carly's striking vocal" and "Michael Brecker's fiery sax solo."
- In 1986, Juice Newton had her third No. 1 country hit with her version of "Hurt". Newton's is the only version of "Hurt" to become a No. 1 hit in the United States.
- In 1988, Peabo Bryson covered the song on his Positive album.
- In 2000, Filipino Singer Mae Rivera made a Tagalog version titled "Aray".
- In 2003, Italian singer Francesco De Gregori sang "A chi", a cover of "Hurt", on the CD Mix.
- In 2015, Patrizio Buanne covered the song in an Italian/English version entitled "A Chi (Hurt)" for his album Viva la Dolce Vita.
