= Graceland =

Home of Elvis Presley in Memphis, Tennessee, US

- U.S. National Register of Historic Places
- U.S. National Historic Landmark
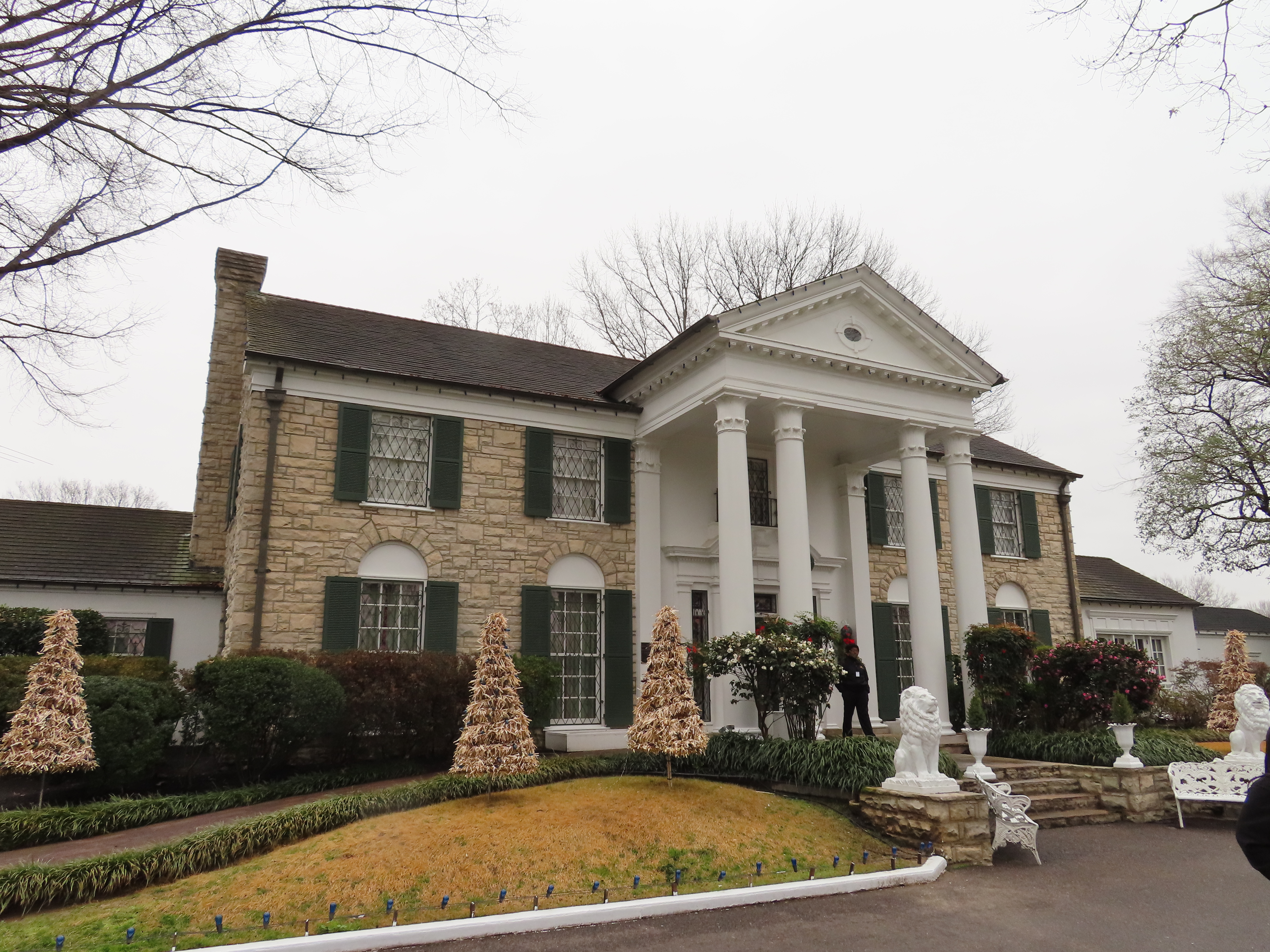
- Graceland Mansion in 2019
- Interactive map showing Graceland's location
- Location: 3764 Elvis Presley Boulevard (Highway 51 South), Memphis, Tennessee, U.S.
- Coordinates: 35°2′45.4″N 90°1′22.6″W
- Area: 14 acres (5.7 ha)
- Built: 1939
- Architect: Furbringer and Ehrman
- Architectural style: Colonial Revival
- NRHP reference No.: 91001585

Significant dates
- Added to NRHP: November 7, 1991
- Designated NHL: March 27, 2006

Graceland is a mansion on a 13.8-acre (5.6-hectare) estate in Memphis, Tennessee, United States, where American singer Elvis Presley lived from 1957 until he died there in 1977. He is buried there, as are his parents Vernon and Gladys, paternal grandmother Minnie Mae, grandson Benjamin, and daughter Lisa Marie.

Graceland is located at 3764 Elvis Presley Boulevard (a segment of U.S. Route 51) in the Whitehaven neighborhood, about nine miles (14 kilometres) south of central Memphis and fewer than four miles (6.4 km) north of the Mississippi border. It was opened to the public as a house museum on June 7, 1982; as of 2024, it receives around 600,000 visitors annually, the second most visited home in the United States after the White House.

Graceland was listed in the National Register of Historic Places on November 7, 1991, becoming the first site recognized for significance related to rock music. It was declared a National Historic Landmark on March 27, 2006, also a first for such a site.

Elvis' father, Vernon, inherited Graceland after Elvis' death on August 16, 1977. Lisa Marie Presley inherited Graceland after she turned 25 years old. Following Lisa Marie's death on January 12, 2023, her eldest daughter, Riley Keough, became the sole trustee and owner.

== History ==
Graceland Farms was originally owned by Stephen C. Toof, founder of S. C. Toof & Co., the oldest commercial printing firm in Memphis. He previously worked as the pressroom foreman of the Memphis Daily Appeal. The site was named after Toof's daughter, Grace. She inherited the property from her father in 1894. After her death, the property passed to her niece Ruth Moore, a Memphis socialite. Ruth and her husband Thomas built a 10,266-square-foot (953.7 m^{2}) Colonial Revival-style mansion on the site in 1939. The house was designed by architects Furbringer and Ehrman.

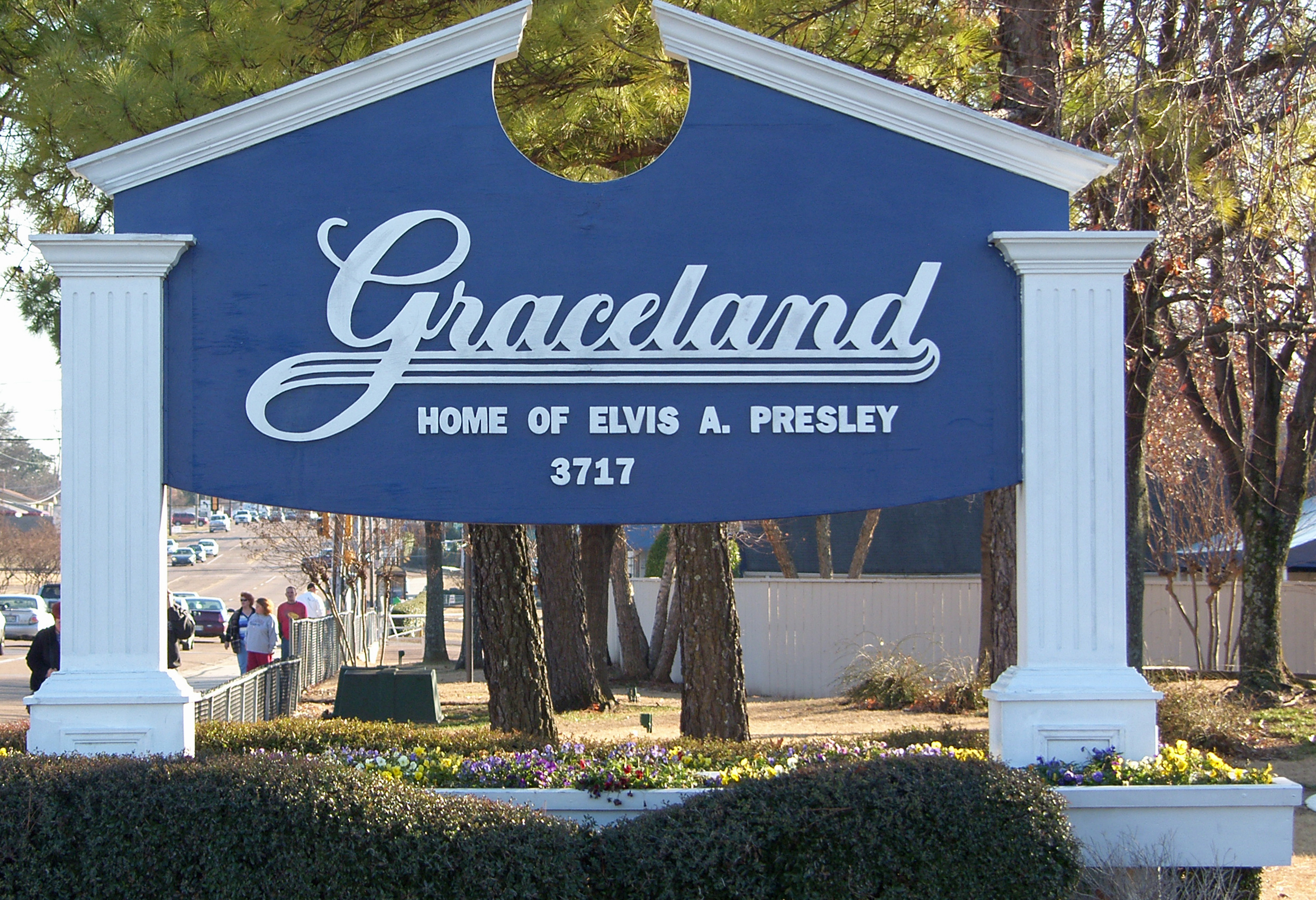
Graceland main entrance sign

After Elvis Presley began his musical career, he purchased a $40,000 home for himself and his family at 1034 Audubon Drive in Memphis in 1956. As his success and fame grew, especially after his appearances on television, the number of fans who would congregate outside the house increased. Presley's neighbors, although happy to have a celebrity living nearby, concluded that the constant gathering of fans and journalists was a nuisance.

In early 1957, Presley gave his parents, Vernon and Gladys Presley, a budget of $100,000 and asked them to find a "farmhouse"-like property to purchase, with buffer space around it. At the time, Graceland was located in southern Shelby County, several miles south of Memphis's main urban area. In later years, Memphis expanded with residential developments, resulting in Graceland being surrounded by other properties. Presley purchased Graceland on March 19, 1957, for a price of $102,500.

Later that year, Presley invited Richard Williams and singer Buzz Cason to the house. Cason said: "We proceeded to clown around on the front porch, striking our best rock 'n' roll poses and snapping pictures with the little camera. We peeked in the not-yet-curtained windows and got a kick out of the pastel colored walls in the front rooms with shades of bright reds and purples that Elvis most certainly had picked out." Presley was fond of claiming that the US government had suggested a visit to Graceland by Nikita Khrushchev of the Soviet Union, "to see how in America a fellow can start out with nothing and, you know, make good."

After Gladys died in 1958 aged 46, Presley's father Vernon married Dee Stanley in 1960, and the couple lived at Graceland for a time. There was some discord between Presley and his stepmother Dee at Graceland, however. Elaine Dundy, who wrote about Presley and his mother, said that

Vernon had settled down with Dee where Gladys had once reigned, while Dee herself – when Elvis was away – had taken over the role of mistress of Graceland so thoroughly as to rearrange the furniture and replace the very curtains that Gladys had approved of." This was too much for Presley, who still loved his late mother deeply. One afternoon, "a van arrived ... and all Dee's household's goods, clothes, 'improvements,' and her own menagerie of pets, were loaded on ... while Vernon, Dee and her three children went by car to a nearby house on Hermitage until they finally settled into a house on Dolan Drive which ran alongside Elvis's estate.

According to Mark Crispin Miller, Graceland became for Presley "the home of the organization that was himself, was tended by a large vague clan of Presleys and deputy Presleys, each squandering the vast gratuities which Elvis used to keep his whole world smiling." The author adds that Presley's father Vernon "had a swimming pool in his bedroom", that there "was a jukebox next to the swimming pool, containing Elvis's favorite records", and that, he "would spend hours in his bedroom, watching his property on a closed-circuit television". According to Presley's cousin, Billy Smith, Presley slept at Graceland with Smith and his wife Jo many times: "we were all three there talking for hours about everything in the world! Sometimes he would have a bad dream and come looking for me to talk to, and he would actually fall asleep in our bed with us."

Priscilla Presley and Elvis married in Las Vegas, Nevada, on May 1, 1967. Their daughter Lisa Marie Presley was born on February 1, 1968, and lived the first years of her life on the estate. After her parents divorced in 1972, her mother moved with Lisa to California. Every year around Christmas, Lisa Marie Presley and all her family would go to Graceland to celebrate Christmas together. Lisa Marie often returned to Graceland for visits.

When Elvis toured, staying in hotels, "the rooms would be remodeled in advance of his arrival, so as to make the same configurations of space as he had at home – the Graceland mansion. His furniture would arrive, and he could unwind after his performances in surroundings which were completely familiar and comforting." 'The Jungle Room' was described as being "an example of particularly lurid kitsch."

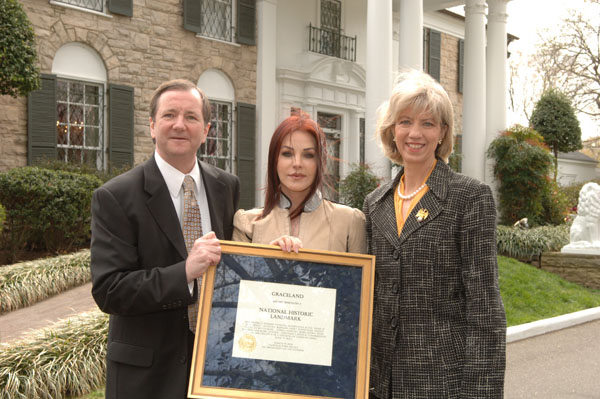
(l–r) Elvis Enterprises chief Jack Soden, Priscilla Presley, and United States Secretary of the Interior Gale Norton March 2006

On August 16, 1977, Presley died aged 42 in his bathroom at Graceland. The official cause of death was cardiac arrhythmia, although later toxicology reports strongly suggested that polypharmacy was the primary cause of death; "fourteen drugs were found in Elvis's system, with several drugs such as codeine in significant quantities. Presley lay in repose in a 900-pound (410 kg), copper-lined coffin just inside the foyer; more than 3,500 of his mourning fans passed by to pay their respects. A private funeral with 200 mourners was held on August 18, 1977, in the house, with the casket placed in front of the stained glass doorway of the music room. Graceland continued to be occupied by members of the family until the death of Presley's aunt Delta in 1993, who had moved in at Elvis's invitation after her husband's death. Elvis's daughter, Lisa Marie Presley, inherited the estate in 1993 when she turned 25.

Presley's grave, along with those of his parents Gladys and Vernon Presley, his grandmother Minnie Mae Presley, Elvis's daughter, Lisa Marie Presley, and his grandson Benjamin Keough are located in the Meditation Garden next to the mansion. They can be visited during the mansion tours or for free before the mansion tours begin. A memorial gravestone for Presley's stillborn twin brother, Jesse Garon, is also at the site.

In 2019, the owners of Graceland threatened to leave Memphis unless the city provided tax incentives. The Memphis City Council subsequently voted on a deal to help fund a $100 million expansion of Graceland.

=== Attempted foreclosure ===
In September 2023, a legal claim was filed in a California probate court that Lisa Marie Presley owed $2.8 million to a company named Naussany Investments & Private Lending LLC. The property was slated for a foreclosure sale in May 2024, as the claimant alleged that Lisa Marie Presley had put the home up as security on a $3.8 million loan from Naussany Investments & Private Lending LLC in 2018. Riley Keough said that the documents underlying the foreclosure were fraudulent and sued to stop the sale. Elvis Presley Enterprises, which manages the rest of the Presley estate, concurred with Keough's claims. Keough's lawsuit included an affidavit from Kimberly L. Philbrick, the Florida notary public who had allegedly notarized Lisa Marie Presley's signature on a promissory note, saying, "I have never met Lisa Marie Presley, nor have I ever notarized a document signed by Lisa Marie Presley" and "I do not know why my signature appears on this document."

In a hearing on May 22, JoeDae Jenkins of the Shelby County Chancery Court declared the lender's claims invalid. The lender subsequently dropped plans to go ahead with the foreclosure without addressing Chancellor Jenkins' allegations. NBC News tried without success to find Naussany Investments & Private Lending and its representative, Gregory E. Naussany, in public records. A real estate professor at the University of Memphis has said, "[I]f this had been someone else's inheritance, someone else's home, it would just be another example [of real estate fraud] that the public never hears about."

No evidence has been found that Naussany Investments & Private Lending LLC was an actual company at the time it sought foreclosure on Graceland.

On August 16, 2024, Lisa Jeanine Findley, a woman from Missouri who is also known by Lisa Holden and many other aliases, was arrested. The U.S. Department of Justice charged Findley with identity theft and mail fraud connected to the attempt to extort the Presley family into selling Graceland. Findley made an appearance in the U.S. District Court for the Western District of Missouri on August 16, 2024, in a hearing that lasted seven minutes. During her arraignment, Findley waived her right to a preliminary hearing or detention hearing and agreed to have those hearings take place in the prosecuting court, the Western District of Tennessee. The U.S. government moved for detention, and Findley was ordered to be removed to the Western District of Tennessee. She remains in custody. On January 25, 2025, Findley pleaded guilty to one count of mail fraud.

According to the U.S. Department of Justice's Office of Public Affairs, Findley "posed as three different individuals" affiliated with the "fictitious private lender" in order to falsely accuse the late Lisa Marie Presley of borrowing $3.8 million from Naussany Investments in 2018. Findley also "allegedly fabricated loan documents" on which she "forged the signatures of Elvis Presley's daughter and a Florida State notary public. Findley then allegedly filed a false creditor's claim with the Superior Court of California in Los Angeles, and a fake deed of trust with the Shelby County Register's Office in Memphis" and "allegedly published a fraudulent foreclosure notice." Despite Findley's direct role, a Graceland official claimed to celebrity news site The Blast that Graceland did not believe Findley was the scam's mastermind, stating that "We think this is the first domino to fall, not the last. We do not believe this is the mastermind behind the scam." Prosecutors have also stated that the person responsible for the scheme was an identity thief based in Nigeria. Findley was also confirmed to have had history of similar criminal cases in the state of Oklahoma, which led to numerous arrests and her serving prison time in both Oklahoma and a Texas federal prison.

On September 23, 2025, Findley was sentenced to 57 months in prison and three years probation.

== Architecture ==
=== Exterior ===
Constructed at the top of a hill and surrounded by rolling pastures and a grove of oak trees, Graceland was designed by the Memphis architectural firm, Furbringer and Erhmanis. It's a two-story, five-bay residence in the Colonial Revival style, with a side-facing gabled roof covered in asphalt shingles, a central two-story projecting pedimented portico, and two one-story wings on the north and south sides. Attached to the wing is an additional one-story stuccoed wing, which was originally a garage that houses up to four cars. The mansion has two chimneys; one on the north side's exterior wall, the second rising through the south side's roof ridge. The central block's front and side facades are veneered with tan Tishomingo limestone from Mississippi and its rear wall is stuccoed, as are the one-story wings. The front facade fenestration on the first floor includes 9x9 double-hung windows set in arched openings with wooden panels above, and 6x6 double-hung windows on the second floor.

Flanked by two marble lions, four stone steps ascend from the driveway to the two-story central projecting pedimented portico. The pediment has dentils and a small, leaded oval window in the center while the portico contains four Corinthian columns with capitals modeled after architect James Stuart's conjectural porticos for the "Tower of the Winds" in Athens, Greece. The portico's cornered columns are matched by pilasters on the front facade. The doorway has a broken arched pediment, full entablature, and engaged columns while its transom and sidelights contain elaborate and colorful stained glass. And above the main entrance is another rectangular window, completed with a shallow iron balcony.

==== Horse stable ====
A horse stable was added on the southeast corner of the outside of Graceland by the property's original owners in 1939, with Elvis himself housing numerous horses in this stable.

=== Interior ===
==== First floor ====
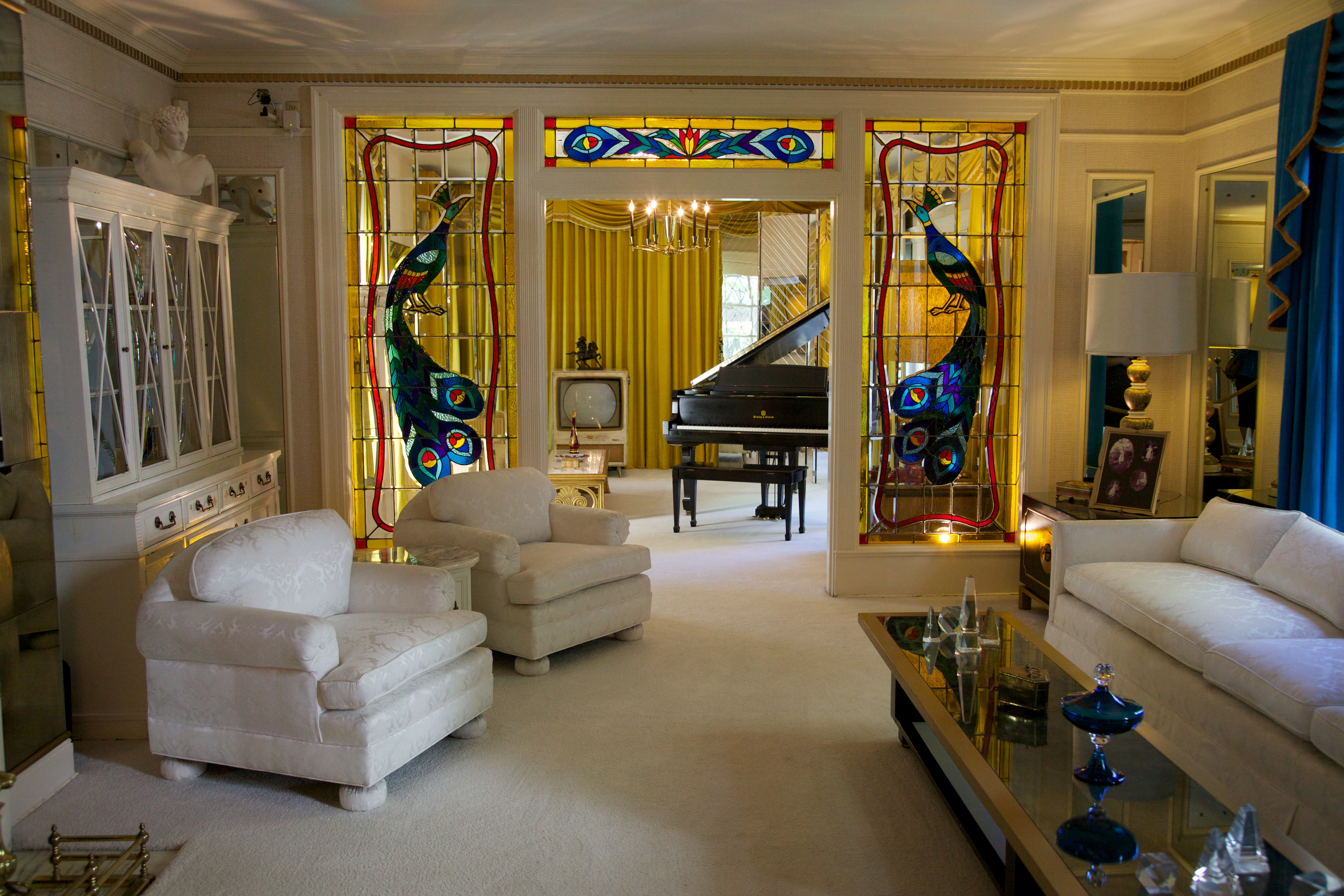
Graceland living room

Graceland is 17,552 square feet (1,630.6 m^{2}) and has a total of 23 rooms, including eight bedrooms and bathrooms. To the right of the Entrance Hall, through an elliptical-arched opening with classical details, is the Living Room. The Living Room contains a 15-foot-long (4.6 m) white couch against the wall overlooking the front yard. To the left are two white sofas, a china cabinet and a fireplace with a mirrored wall. The painting that hangs in the room was Elvis's last Christmas present from his father, Vernon, and also displayed are photographs of Elvis's parents Vernon and Gladys, Elvis and Lisa Marie. Behind an adjoined doorway is the Music Room, framed by vivid large peacocks set in stained glass and contains a black baby grand piano and a 1950s style TV. And the third adjacent room is a bedroom that was occupied by Elvis's parents. The walls, carpet, dresser, and queen size bed are bright white with the bed draped in a velvet-looking dark purple bedspread along with an en-suite full bathroom done in pink.

To the left of the Entrance Hall, mirroring the Living Room, is the Dining Room, headlined by a massive crystal chandelier. It features six plush chairs in golden metal frames set around a marble table, all of which are placed on black marble flooring in the center with carpet around the perimeter. Connected to the Dining Room is the Kitchen, which was used by Elvis's aunt Delta until her death in 1993 before it was opened to the public two years later.

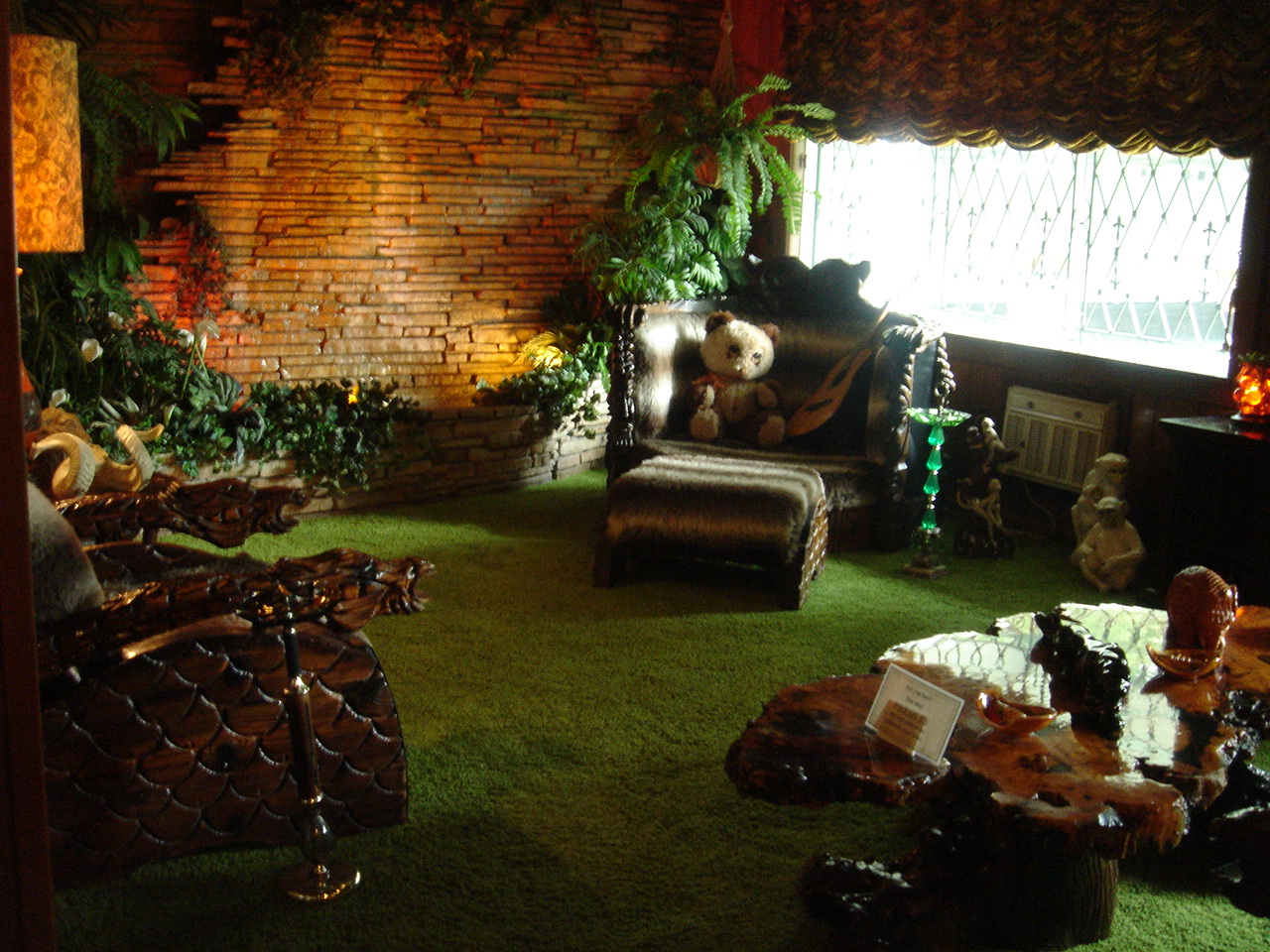
The Jungle Room, Graceland

The original one-story wing on the north end of the residence includes a mechanical room, bedroom, and bath. In the mid-1960s, Presley enlarged the house to create a den known as the Jungle Room which features an indoor waterfall of cut field stone on the north wall. The room also contains items both related to and imported from the state of Hawaii because, after starring in the tropical film "Blue Hawaii" (1961), the musician wanted to bring some memorabilia from The Aloha State to his mansion, which gives visitors the same feeling. In 1976, the Jungle Room was converted into a recording studio, where he recorded the bulk of his final two albums, From Elvis Presley Boulevard, Memphis, Tennessee (1976) and Moody Blue (1977); these were his final known recordings in a studio setting. During the mid-1960s expansion of the house, Presley constructed a large wing on the south side of the main house that was a sidewalk, between the music room in the original one-story wing and the swimming pool area, that connected to the house by a small enclosed gallery. The new wing initially housed a slot car track and to store his many items of appreciation, but was later remodeled to what is now known as the Trophy Building, which now features an exhibit about the Presley family, and includes Priscilla's wedding dress, Elvis's wedding tuxedo, Lisa Marie's toy chest and baby clothes and more.

==== Second floor ====
The Entrance Hall contains a white staircase leading to the house's second floor with a wall of mirrors. However, the second floor is not open to visitors, out of respect for the Presley family, and partially to avoid any improper focus on the bathroom which was the site of his death. Still, it features Elvis's bedroom at the southwest corner that connects to his dressing room and bathroom in the northwest. His daughter Lisa Marie's bedroom is in the northeast corner, and in the southeast is a bedroom that served as a private personal office for the musician. The floor has been untouched since the day Elvis died and is rarely seen by non-family members. Lisa Marie Presley's ex-husband Nicolas Cage told The New York Times in 2026 that he is one of the few people to have been allowed to visit the second floor.

==== Basement ====
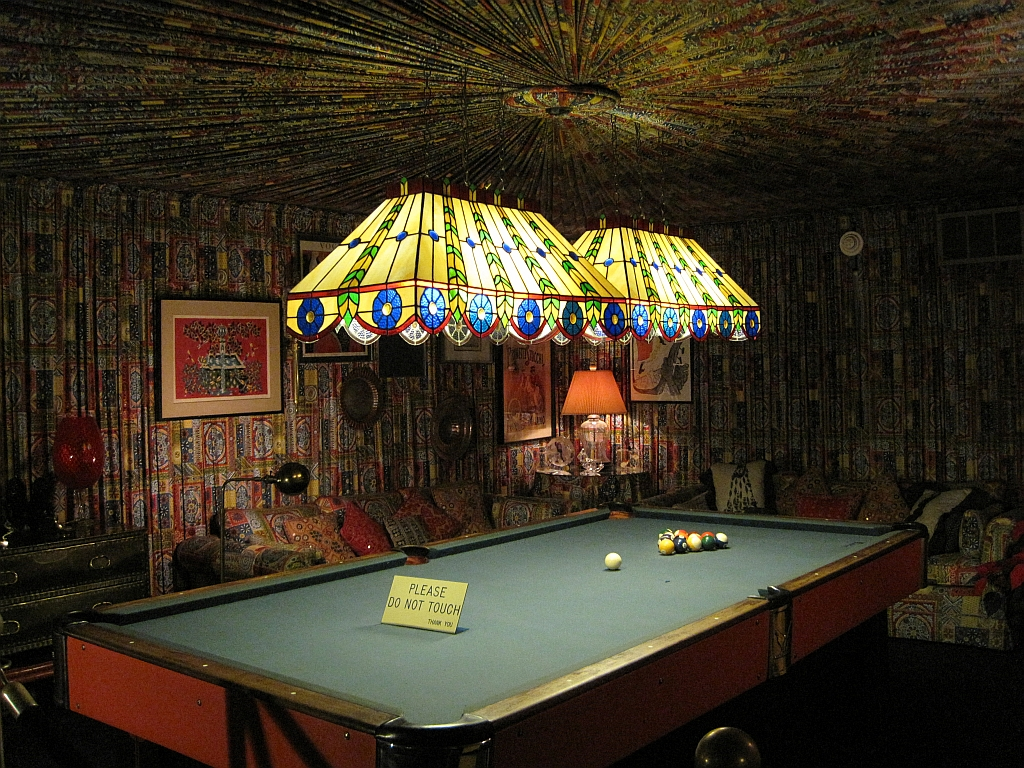
Graceland pool table

Downstairs in the basement is the TV room, where Elvis often watched three television sets at once, and was within close reach of a wet bar. The three TV sets are built into the room's south wall and there's a stereo, and cabinets for Elvis's record collection. Painted on the west wall is The King's 1970s logo of a lightning bolt and cloud with the initials TCB, both of which represent 'taking care of business in a flash'. And the last room in the mansion opposite of the TV room is the billiard room; an avid billiards player, Elvis bought the pool table in 1960 and had the walls and ceiling covered with 350–400 yards of pleated cotton fabric after the two basement rooms were remodeled in 1974. The pool balls are arranged just the way they were in the musician's final days, along with a sign that says "PLEASE DO NOT TOUCH, THANK YOU." And in one corner of the pool table, there's a rip in the green felt, which was caused by one of Elvis's friends in a failed attempt of a trick shot.

== Criticism ==
Critics such as Albert Goldman write: "Though it cost a lot of money to fill up Graceland with the things that appealed to Elvis Presley, nothing in the house is worth a dime." In chapter 1 of his book, Elvis (1981), the author describes Graceland as looking like a brothel: "it appears to have been lifted from some turn-of-the-century bordello down in the French Quarter of New Orleans. Lulu White or the Countess Willie Piazza might have contrived this plushy parlor for the entertainment of Gyp the Blood. The room is a gaudy mélange of red velour and gilded tassels, Louis XV furniture and porcelain bric-a-brac..." And he dismisses the interior as "bizarre," "garish" and "phony," adding that "King Elvis's obsession with royal red reaches an intensity that makes you gag."

In similar terms, Greil Marcus writes that people who visited the inside of Graceland—"people who to a real degree shared Elvis Presley's class background, and whose lives were formed by his music—have returned with one word to describe what they saw: 'Tacky.' Tacky, garish, tasteless—words others translated as white trash."

According to Karal Ann Marling, Graceland is "a Technicolor illusion. The façade is Gone With the Wind all the way. The den in the back is Mogambo with a hint of Blue Hawaii. Living in Graceland was like living on a Hollywood backlot, where patches of tropical scenery alternated with the blackened ruins of antebellum Atlanta. It was like living in a Memphis movie theater... Diehard fans are sometimes disappointed by the formal rooms along the highway side of Graceland. They're beautiful, in a chilly blue-and-white way, but remote and overarranged." The Jungle Room's "overt bad taste" lets nonbelievers "recoil in horror and imagine themselves a notch or two higher than Elvis on the class scale."

== Estate ==
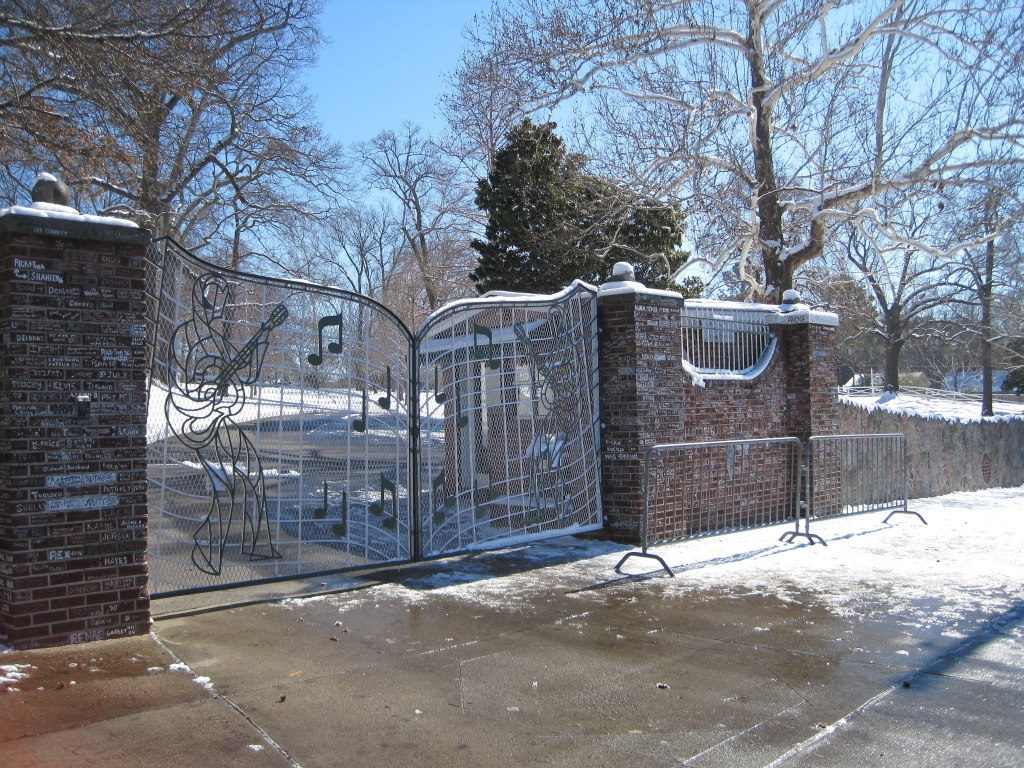
Music-themed gate

After purchasing the property Presley spent in excess of $500,000 carrying out extensive modifications to suit his needs including a pink Alabama fieldstone wall surrounding the grounds that has several years' worth of graffiti (signatures and messages) from visitors, who simply refer to it as "the wall". Designed and built by Abe Sauer is the wrought-iron front gate shaped like a book of sheet music, along with green colored musical notes and two mirrored silhouettes of Elvis playing his guitar. Sauer also installed a kidney shaped swimming pool and a racquetball court, which is reminiscent of an old country club, furnished in dark leather and a functional bar. There is a sunken sitting area with the ever-present stereo system found throughout Graceland, as well as the dark brown upright piano upon which Elvis played for what were to be his last songs, Willie Nelson's "Blue Eyes Crying in the Rain" and "Unchained Melody".

However, reports conflict about which one was the last song. The sitting area has a floor-to-ceiling shatterproof window designed to watch the many racquetball games that took place there when Elvis was alive. In the early hours of the morning on which Elvis died, he played a game of racquetball with his girlfriend Ginger Alden, his first cousin Billy Smith and Billy's wife Jo before ending the game with the song on the piano before walking into the main house to wash his hair and go to bed. Today the two story court has been restored to the way it was when Elvis used the building.

Elsewhere on the estate is a small white building that served as an office for Vernon, along with an old smokehouse that housed a shooting range and a fully functional stable of horses.

One of Presley's better known modifications was the addition of the Meditation Garden, designed and built by architect Bernard Grenadier. It was used by the musician to reflect on any problems or situations that arose during his life. It is also where his entire family is buried: himself (1935–1977), his parents Gladys (1912–1958) and Vernon (1916–1979), and grandmother Minnie Mae Hood (1890–1980) while a small stone memorializes his twin brother Jesse Garon, who died at birth thirty minutes before Elvis was born on January 8, 1935. In late 2020, Lisa Marie's son Benjamin Keough was laid to rest on the opposite end of the Meditation Garden after his death from suicide in July of that year. Lisa Marie Presley died from sudden cardiac arrest in January 2023 and is buried next to her son.

== Tourist destination ==
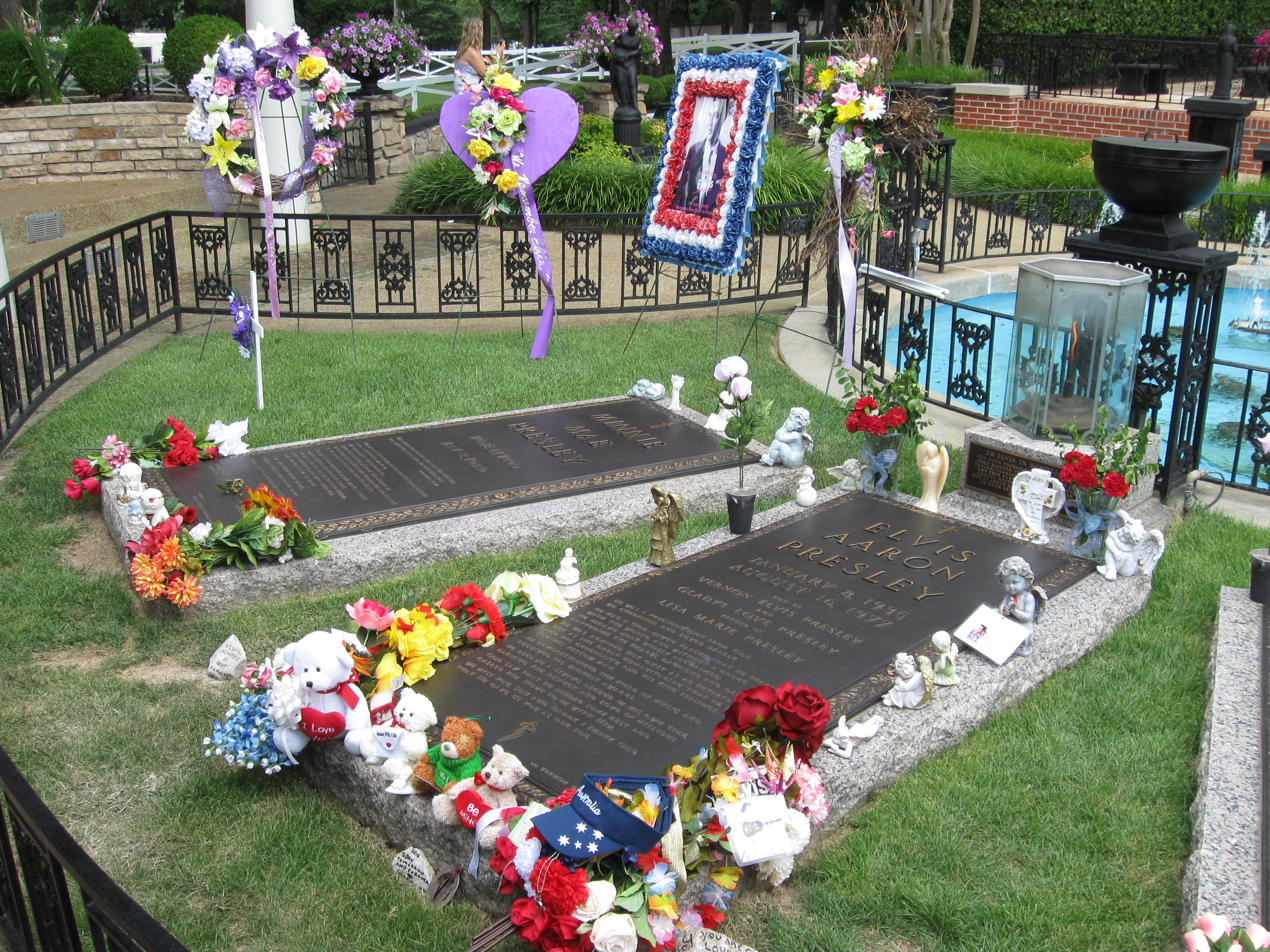
The graves of Elvis and his grandmother Minnie Mae on the grounds at Graceland

After Elvis Presley's death in 1977, Vernon Presley served as executor of his estate. Upon his death in 1979, he chose Priscilla to serve as the estate executor for Elvis's only child, Lisa Marie, who was only 11. Graceland itself cost $500,000 a year in upkeep, and expenses had dwindled Elvis's and Priscilla's daughter Lisa Marie's inheritance to only $1 million. Taxes were due on the property; those and other expenses due came to over $500,000. Faced with having to sell Graceland, Priscilla examined other famous houses and museums, and hired a CEO, Jack Soden, to turn Graceland into a moneymaker. Graceland was opened to the public on June 7, 1982. Priscilla's gamble paid off; after only a month of opening Graceland's doors the estate made back all the money it had invested. Priscilla Presley became the chairwoman and president of Elvis Presley Enterprises, or EPE, stating at that time she would do so until Lisa Marie reached 21 years of age. The enterprise's fortunes soared and eventually the trust grew to be worth over $100 million.

An annual procession through the estate and past Elvis's grave is held on the anniversary of his death. Known as Elvis Week, it includes a full schedule of speakers and events, including the only Elvis Mass at St. Paul's Church, the highlight for many Elvis fans of all faiths. The 20th Anniversary in 1997 had several hundred media groups from around the world that were present resulting in the event gaining its greatest media publicity.

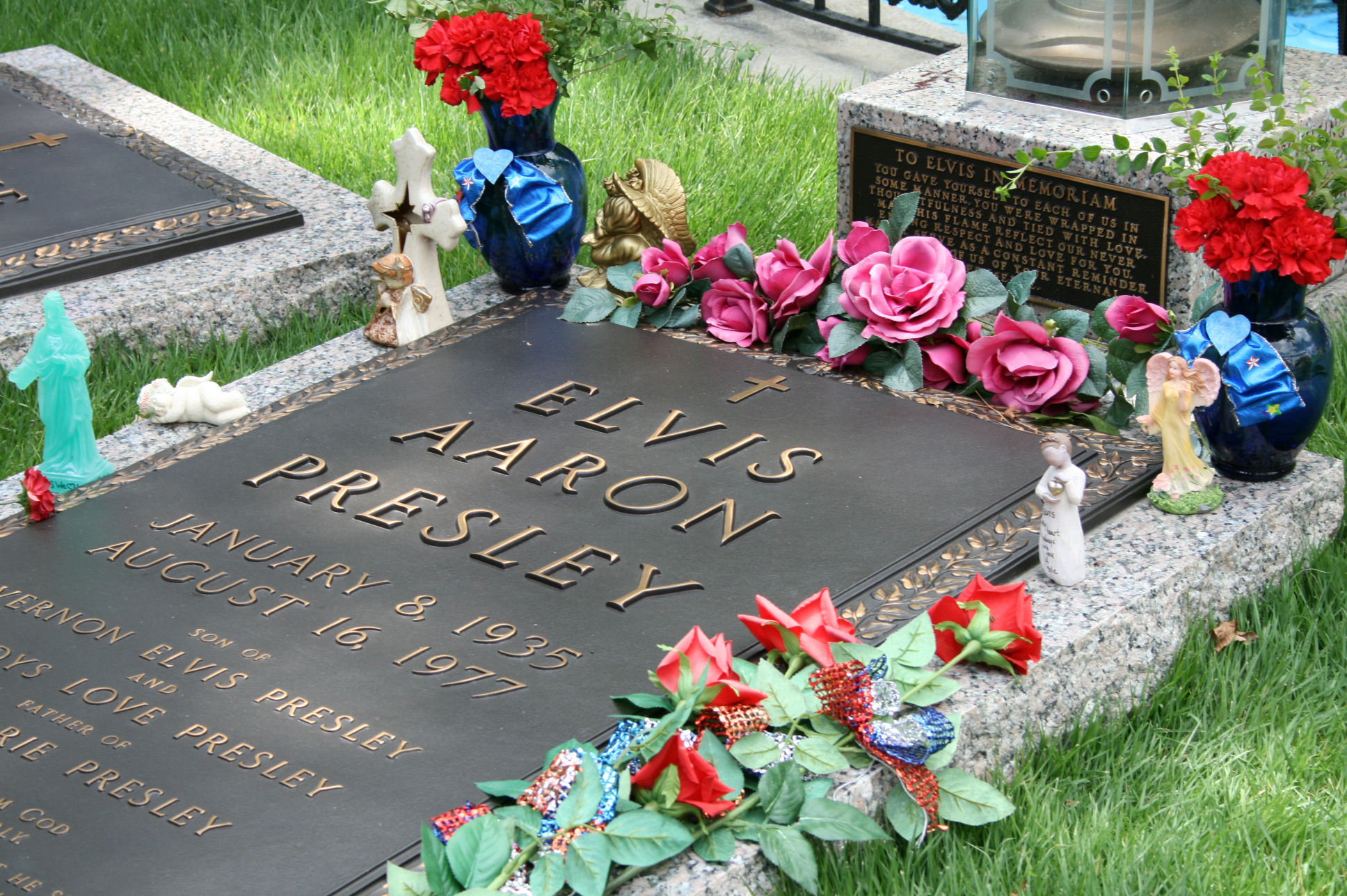
Presley's grave

One of the largest gatherings assembled on the 25th anniversary in 2002 with one estimate of 40,000 people in attendance, despite the heavy rain. On the 38th anniversary of Elvis's death, an estimated 30,000 people attended the Candlelight Vigil during the night of August 15–16, 2015. On the 40th anniversary of Elvis's death, on August 15–16, 2017, at least 50,000 fans were expected to attend the Candlelight Vigil. No official figure seems to have been released, maybe because, for the first time, attendees had to pay at least the lowest tour fare, $28.75, to cover the extra security costs due to a larger than usual crowd.

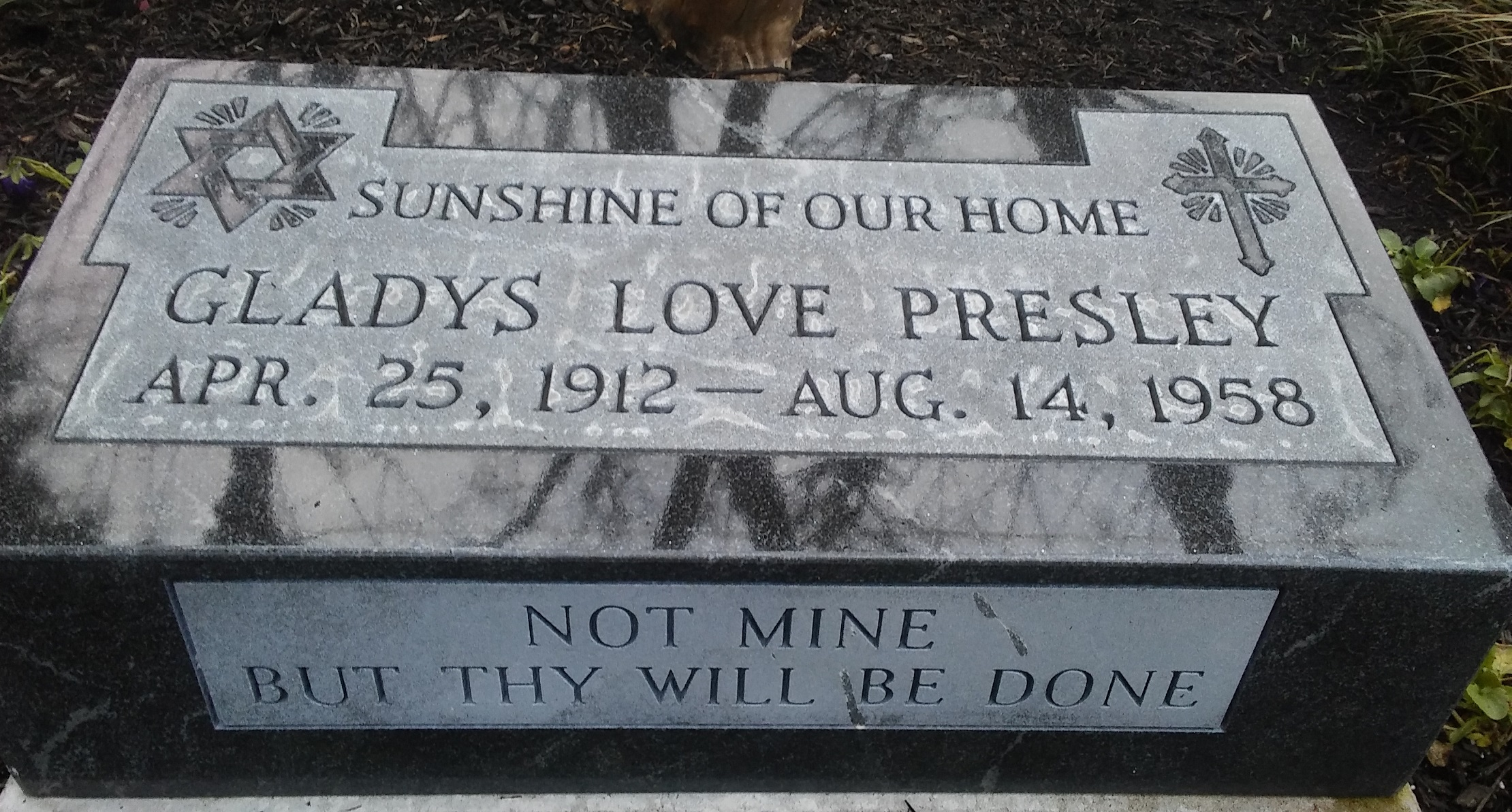
Since 2018, the headstone of Gladys Presley, which was placed on her original grave at Memphis' Forest Hill Cemetery in December 1964 and later stored in the Graceland archive after her remains were relocated to Graceland in 1977, has been publicly displayed in the Graceland Mediation Garden.

For many of the hundreds of thousands of people who visit Graceland each year, the visit takes on a quasi-religious perspective. They may plan for years to journey to the home of the 'King' of rock and roll. On site, headphones narrate the salient events of Elvis's life and introduce the relics that adorn the rooms and corridors. The rhetorical mode is hagiographic, celebrating the life of an extraordinary man, emphasizing his generosity, his kindness and good fellowship, how he was at once a poor boy who made good, an extraordinary musical talent, a sinner and substance abuser, and a religious man devoted to the Gospel and its music. At the meditation garden, containing Elvis's grave, some visitors pray, kneel, or quietly sing one of Elvis's favorite hymns. The brick wall that encloses the mansion's grounds is covered with graffiti that express an admiration for Presley as well as petitions for help and thanks for favors granted.

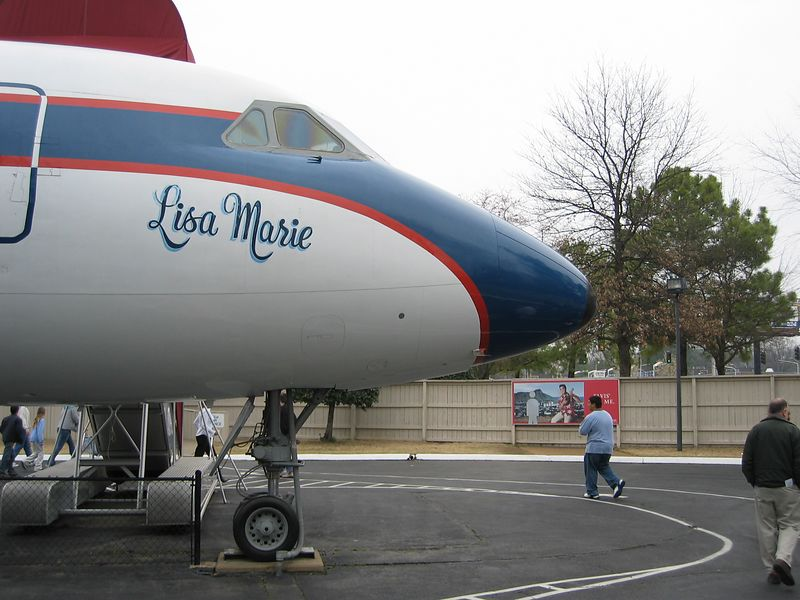
Presley's Convair 880, Lisa Marie, named after his daughter

The Graceland grounds include a new exhibit complex, Elvis Presley's Memphis, which includes a new car museum, Presley Motors, which houses Elvis's Pink Cadillac. The complex features new exhibits and museums, as well as a studio for Sirius Satellite Radio's all-Elvis Presley channel. The service's subscribers all over North America can hear Presley's music from Graceland around the clock. Not far away on display are his two aircraft including Lisa Marie (a Convair 880 jetliner) and Hound Dog II (a Lockheed JetStar business jet). The jets are owned by Graceland and are on permanent static display.

In early August 2005, Lisa Marie Presley sold 85% of the business side of her father's estate. She kept the Graceland property itself, as well as the bulk of the possessions found therein, and she turned over the management of Graceland to CKX, Inc., an entertainment company (on whose board of directors Priscilla Presley sat) that also owns 19 Entertainment, creator of the American Idol TV show.

Graceland Holdings LLC, led by managing partner Joel Weinshanker, is the majority owner of EPE. Lisa Marie Presley's estate retains a 15% ownership in the company.

In August 2018, Gladys Presley's headstone, which contained the Jewish star of David on one side and a cross on the other and was designed by Elvis himself, became publicly displayed when it was placed in Graceland's Mediation Garden after being stored for many years in the Graceland Archive.

Lisa Marie Presley's estate, which is being held in trust for her daughters Riley Keough and Harper and Finley Lockwood, retain 100% sole personal ownership of Graceland Mansion itself and its over 13-acre original grounds as well as Elvis Presley's personal effects – including costumes, wardrobe, awards, furniture, cars, etc. Prior to her death in 2023, Lisa Marie Presley had made the mansion property and her father's personal effects permanently available for tours of Graceland and for use in all of EPE's operations.

== Notable visitors ==
According to Elvis Presley's Enterprises, staff at Graceland informally kept a list of celebrities who had visited in the first years following Elvis's death. This practice was not formalized for a decade. Muhammad Ali, who was a friend of Elvis, was an early celebrity visitor in 1978, as was singer Paul Simon. He toured Graceland in the early 80s and afterward wrote a song of the same name; it was the title track of his Grammy-winning album Graceland.

During the Joshua Tree Tour in 1987, U2 toured Graceland. The footage was filmed for the film Rattle & Hum. During the visit, drummer, Larry Mullen Jr., sat on Elvis Presley's motorcycle—against the rules for Graceland visitors.

In 1991, Jimmy Carter was the first person to have served as U.S. president to visit Graceland. Carter, who was previously outspoken about his personal friendship with Elvis, visited during his daughter Amy's graduation from Memphis College of Art.

On June 30, 2006, then US President George W. Bush hosted Japanese Prime Minister Junichiro Koizumi for a tour of the mansion. It was one of the few private residences on United States soil to have been the site of an official joint-visit by a sitting US president and a serving head of a foreign government. On August 6, 2010, Prince Albert II, Head of State of the Principality of Monaco, and his fiancée (now Princess of Monaco) Charlene Wittstock, toured Graceland while vacationing in the US. On May 26, 2013, Paul McCartney of The Beatles visited Graceland. Prince William and Prince Harry, while in Memphis for a friend's wedding, visited Graceland on May 2, 2014.

The home was visited by the Duchess of Devonshire, the sitting ambassadors of India, France, China, Korea and Israel to the United States; as well as several US governors, members of the US Congress, and at least two Nobel Prize winners, namely singer-songwriter Bob Dylan, a Literature Prize laureate, and the former President of Costa Rica, Oscar Arias, a Peace Prize honoree, who visited on October 10, 2001.

In May 2016, Graceland welcomed a newlywed couple as its 20 millionth visitor.

In June 2022, actors Austin Butler and Tom Hanks visited the mansion and were interviewed virtually by the Good Morning America news program from the Jungle Room to talk about their biographical film Elvis.

In March 2026, US President Donald Trump visited Graceland, where he signed a replica of a guitar used by Elvis.

== In popular culture ==
- Paul Simon named an album Graceland, as well as its title track. The song won the Grammy Award for Record of the Year in 1987.
- The film 3000 Miles to Graceland is about a group of criminals who plan to rob a casino during an international Elvis week, disguised as Elvis impersonators. No scenes take place at or near the estate.
- The film Finding Graceland stars Harvey Keitel with Johnathon Schaech. Keitel is an impersonator who claims to be the real Elvis after Schaech picks him up as a hitch-hiker.

== See also ==
- Graceland Too
- List of museums in Tennessee
- List of music museums
- List of National Historic Landmarks in Tennessee
- National Register of Historic Places listings in Shelby County, Tennessee
- Tourism in Memphis, Tennessee, including a special Graceland section, focused on the touristic aspects
