= Felton Jarvis =

American record producer and singer (1934–1981)

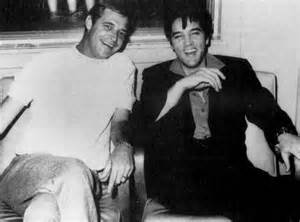
- Jarvis (left) with Elvis Presley, 1967

Background information
- Born: Charles Felton Jarvis; November 15, 1934; Atlanta, Georgia, U.S.
- Died: January 3, 1981 (aged 46) Nashville, Tennessee, U.S.
- Occupations: Record producer, singer
- Years active: 1959−1980

Charles Felton Jarvis (November 15, 1934 – January 3, 1981) was an American record producer and singer.

== Career ==
As an RCA Victor record producer, Jarvis was responsible for most recordings of Elvis Presley in the years 1966–1977. He also released his own singles in the late 1950s and early 1960s. However, he was more successful as a record producer. He produced the first six albums by John Hartford, and the artists Tommy Roe, Michael Nesmith, Fats Domino, Jimmy Dean, Fess Parker, Charley Pride, Carl Perkins, Skeeter Davis, Willie Nelson, Gladys Knight & the Pips, Maria Dallas, and Jerry Reed.

== Guitar Man ==
In mid-December 1980, Jarvis finished an Elvis Presley project for RCA Records called Guitar Man. It contained ten previously recorded songs that matched Presley's original vocals with new overdubbed instrumental tracks.

On December 16, 1980, Jarvis and Jerry Flowers, an employee of RCA Records discussed questions for a radio interview to be held the following week on the occasion of the album's release. Their conversation was captured on cassette tape and includes thoughts on the Guitar Man project and Jarvis's career.

The formal radio interview never took place because Jarvis suffered a stroke on December 19, 1980. He was admitted to a Nashville hospital and died there on January 3, 1981, at the age of 46.

Felton Jarvis is buried in the Mount Hope Cemetery in Franklin, Tennessee.

== Discography ==
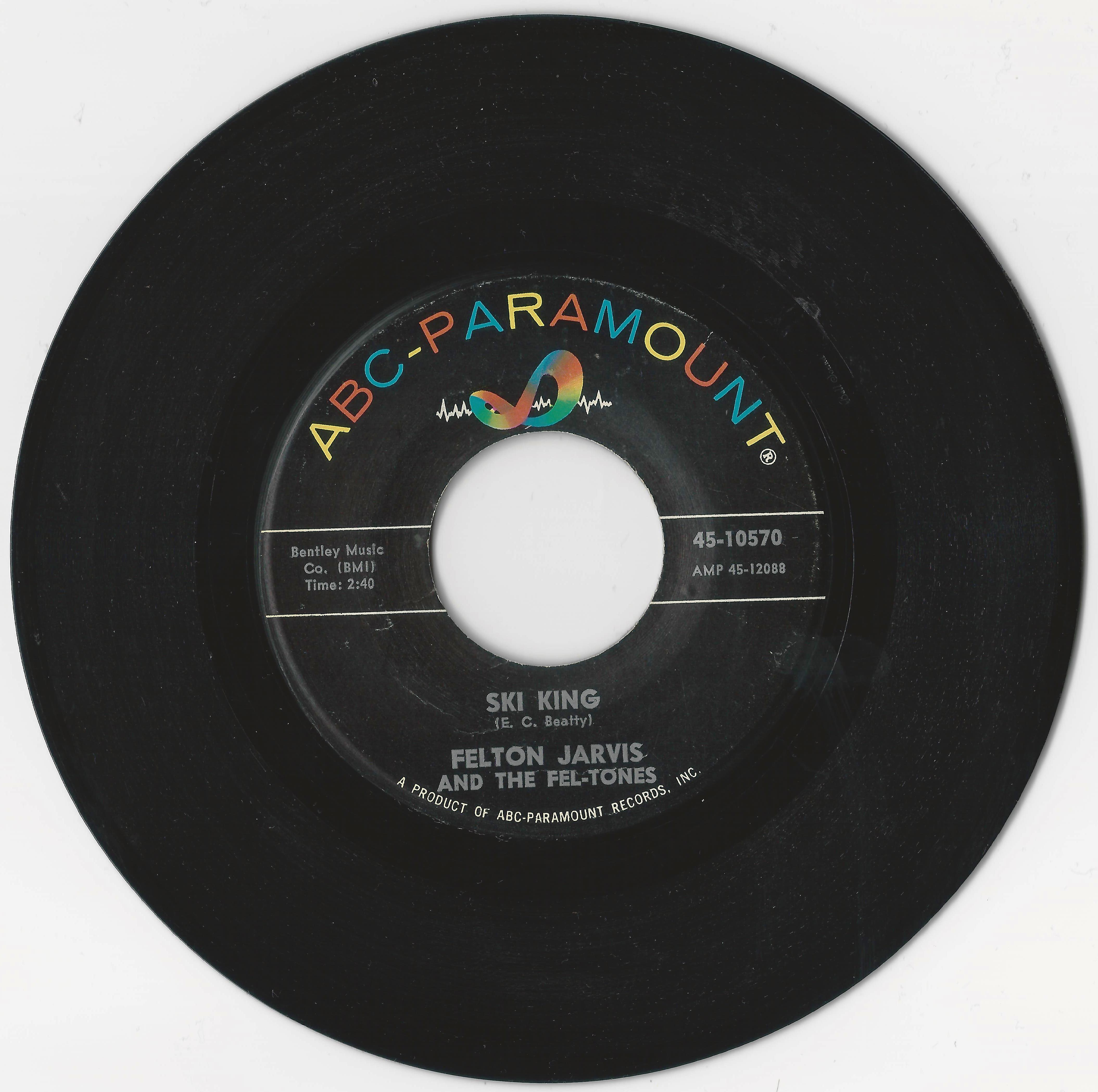
"Ski King" / "Be-I-Bye" (1964)

=== Singles ===
- "Honest John (The Workin' Man's Friend)" / "Don't Knock Elvis" (1959) – on the label Viva Records
- "Swingin' Cat" / "Honest John (The Working Man's Friend)" (1960) – on the label Thunder Int. Columbia Miss
- "Dimples" / "Little Wheel" (1960) – on the label Thunder Int. Columbia Miss
- "Indian Love Call" / "Goin' Down Town" (1961) – on the label MGM
- "Ski King" / "Be-I-Bye" (1964) – on the label ABC-Paramount
- "Too Many Tigers" / "Knickle Knuckle" (1965) – on the label ABC-Paramount
