= Tony Joe White discography =

- Studio albums: 16
- Soundtrack albums: 1
- Live albums: 4
- Compilation albums: 2
- Singles: 29

Tony Joe White was an American singer-songwriter. His discography comprises 16 studio albums, four live albums, two greatest hits albums and 29 singles.

== Albums ==
Title	Details	Peak chart positions					
Title	Details	US	US Country	US Blues	US Folk	AUS	UK
Black and White	Release date: 1968; Label: Monument (SLP 18114)	51	—	—	—	—	—
...Continued	Release date: 1969; Label: Monument (SLP 18133)	183	—	—	—	—	—
Tony Joe	Release date: 1970; Label: Monument (SLP 18142)	—	—	—	—	—	63
The Best of Tony Joe White	Release date: 1971 (No U.S. Release); Label: Monument (92274)	—	—	—	—	—	—
Tony Joe White	Release date: 1971; Label: Warner Bros. (WS 1900)	167	—	—	—	—	
The Train I'm On	Release date: 1972; Label: Warner Bros. (WS 46 147)	—	—	—	—	—	—
Homemade Ice Cream	Release date: 1973; Label: Warner Bros. (WS 46 229)	—	—	—	—	—	—
Catch My Soul (Original Soundtrack Recording)	Release date: 1973; Label: RCA Victor (RS-1004)	—	—	—	—	—	—
Eyes	Release date: 1976; Label: 20th Century (6370 254)	—	—	—	—	—	—
The Real Thang	Release date: 1980; Label: Casablanca (6302 069)	—	—	—	—	—	—
Dangerous	Release date: 1983; Label: CBS (25563)	—	50	—	—	—	—
Roosevelt and Ira Lee	Release date: 1984; Label: Astan Music (20095)	—	—	—	—	—	—
Tony Joe White Live!	Release date: 1986; Label: Dixie Frog (DFG-8407)	—	—	—	—	—	—
Closer to the Truth	Release date: 1991; Label: Polydor-Remark (511 386-2)	—	—	—	—	76	—
The Path of a Decent Groove	Release date: 1993; Label: Polydor-Remark (519 938-2)	—	—	—	—	—	—
Tony Joe White (Live In Europe 1971) [reissue of Dixie Frog album]	Release date: 1993; Label: POPalmanac (PACD-7017)	—	—	—	—	—	—
The Best of Tony Joe White (featuring Polk Salad Annie)	Release date: 1993; Label: Warner Bros. (WPCP-5516)	—	—	—	—	—	—
Lake Placid Blues	Release date: 1995; Label: Polydor-Remark (527 530-2)	—	—	—	—	—	—
One Hot July	Release date: 1999; Label: Mercury (558 894-2)	—	—	—	—	85	—
The Beginning	Release date: 2001; Label: Swamp (855520)	—	—	—	—	—	—
Snakey	Release date: 2002; Label: Swamp (7707242-2)	—	—	—	—	—	—
The Heroines	Release date: 2004; Label: Sanctuary (SANSP-86366-2)	—	—	—	—	—	—
Live from Austin TX: Tony Joe White	Release date: February 21, 2006; Label: New West (NW-6092)	—	—	—	—	—	—
Uncovered	Release date: September 5, 2006; Label: Swamp (7707243-2)	—	—	4	—	—	—
Deep Cuts	Release date: July 2008; Label: Swamp (7708343-2)	—	—	—	—	—	—
The Shine	Release date: September 28, 2010; Label: Swamp (857220)	—	—	10	—	—	—
Hoodoo	Release date: September 16, 2013; Label: Yep Roc (2348)	—	—	8	—	—	—
Rain Crow	Release date: May 27, 2016; Label: Yep Roc (2450)	—	46	—	25	—	—
Bad Mouthin'	Release date: September 28, 2018; Label: Yep Roc (2593)	—	—	—	—	—	—
Smoke from the Chimney	Release date: May 7, 2021; Label: Easy Eye Sound (EES-016)	—	—	—	—	—	—

== US singles ==
Year	Single title	Peak positions				Record label	Catalogue no.
Year	Single title	US	US Country	AUS	CAN	Record label	Catalogue no.
1967	"Georgia Pines"	—	—	—	—	Monument	MN 45-1003
1968	"Old Man Willis"	—	—	—	—	Monument	MN 45-1053
1968	"I Protest"	—	—	—	—	Monument	MN 45-1070
1968	"Soul Francisco"	—	—	—	—	Monument	MN 45-1086
1968	"Polk Salad Annie"	8	—	7	10	Monument	MN 45-1104
1969	"Roosevelt and Ira Lee"	44	—	70	47	Monument	MN 45-1169
1970	"High Sheriff of Calhoun Parrish"	112	—	17	—	Monument	MN 45-1193
1970	"Save Your Sugar for Me"	94	—	—	—	Monument	MN 45-1206
1970	"Scratch My Back"	117	—	—	—	Monument	MN 45-1227
1971	"The Daddy"	—	—	—	—	Warner Bros	7468
1971	"My Kinda Woman"	—	—	—	—	Warner Bros	7477
1971	"Lustful Earl and the Married Woman"	—	—	—	—	Warner Bros	7505
1971	"Delta Love"	—	—	—	—	Warner Bros	7523
1972	"Even Trolls Love Rock and Roll"	—	—	—	—	Warner Bros	WB 7591
1972	"I've Got a Thing About You Baby"	—	—	—	—	Warner Bros	WB 7607
1973	"Backwoods Preacher Man"	—	—	—	—	Warner Bros	WB 7712
1974	"Sign of the Lion"	—	—	—	—	Warner Bros	WB 7780
1974	"Don't Let the Door (Hit You in the Butt)"	—	—	—	—	Warner Bros	WBS 8042
1976	"It Must Be Love"	108	—	—	—	20th Century	TC-2276
1976	"Hold on to Your Hiney"	—	—	—	—	20th Century	TC-2322
1976	"Polk Salad Annie"	—	—	—	—	Warner Bros	GWB 0333
1978	"We'll Live on Love"	—	—	—	—	Arista	AS 0376
1980	"I Get Off on It"	79	—	—	—	Casablanca	NB-2279
1980	"Mama Don't Let Your Cowboys Grow Up to Be Babies"	—	91	—	—	Casablanca	NB 2304
1982	"Polk Salad Annie"	—	—	—	—	ERIC	E 292
1983	"Swamp Rap"	—	—	—	—	Columbia	38-03967
1983	"Naughty Lady"	—	—	—	—	Columbia	38-04356
1983	"The Lady in My Life"	—	55	—	—	Columbia	38-04134
1983	"We Belong Together"	—	85	—	—	Columbia	38-04356
1983	"You Just Get Better All the Time"	—	—	—	—	Columbia	38-04476

=== CD singles ===
Single title	Record label	Year	Catalogue no.	Country of release
Good in Blues/Cool Town Woman	Polydor-Remark	1991	865 000-2	NL release
Tunica Motel/Steamy Windows/The Blues	Polydor-Remark	1991	865 496-2	FR, AU release
Ain't Going Down This Time/Cool Town Woman/Undercover Agent	Polydor	1992	865 911-2	DE release
Tunica Motel/Undercover Agent/Good in Blues/Steamy Windows	Polydor	1992	865 953-2	DE release
Polk Salad Annie/Soul Francisco/Rainy Night in Georgia	Warner Bros	1993	WE 739	DE release
Tina/Backside of Paradise	Polydor	1993	859 558-2	FR release
Down in Nice/Always the Song	Polydor-Remark	1993	885 266-2	FR release
Polk Salad Annie/High Sheriff/They Caught the Devil/Even Trolls Rock 'n' Roll	Remark	1993	4313	FR release
Paris Mood Tonight/Menutha	Remark	1995	579 160-2	FR release
Lake Placid Blues/Paris Mood Tonight/Let the Healing Begin	RDM Festival	1995	PRD 95/28	AU release
Lake Placid Blues/Let the Healing Begin/Steamy Windows	Polydor	1995	TJWHITE1	UK release
Crack the Window Baby/Gumbo John/Across from Midnight/The Delta Singer	Mercury/Tupelo	1999	TJWPR01/99	AU release
Across from Midnight	Mercury	1998	9112	FR release
Gumbo John/Don't Over Do It	Mercury	1998	566 554-2	DE release
Gumbo John/Goin' Down Rockin'/Don't Over Do It	Mercury	1999	566 555-2	SE release
Can't Go Back Home	Sanctuary	2004	SANPX301X	EU release
Closing in on the Fire	Sanctuary	2004		EU release
Not One Bad Thought	Swamp Records	2006		US release
Rainy Night in Georgia/Run for Cover	Swamp Records	2006	MRCDS857	US release
