= Blue pill =

Blue pill may refer to:

== Drugs ==
- Blue mass, sometimes referred to as blue pill, an obsolete mercury-based patent medicine from the 17th century
- Sildenafil (Viagra), sometimes referred to as the "blue pill" or the "little blue pill", since 1998, a medicine used to treat erectile dysfunction
- Slang for Percocet, more specifically counterfeit pills laced with fentanyl

== Other uses ==
- Blue Pill (software), a 2006 proof-of-concept virtual machine based rootkit
- Blues Pills, a 2011 Swedish rock band
  - Blues Pills (album), 2014 debut album by Blues Pills
- Blue Pills, a 2001 autobiographical comic book by Frederik Peeters
- Red pill and blue pill, a plot device within the 1999 Matrix series in which the blue pill symbolizes blissful ignorance of reality

== See also ==
- Black pill (disambiguation)
- Red pill (disambiguation)
