= Elements and Things =

Elements and Things may refer to:

- "Elements and Things", a song from ...Continued (1969)
- "Elements and Things", a song from Lady in Gold (album) (2016)
