= Closer to the Truth (disambiguation) =

Closer to the Truth is a 2013 album by Cher.

Closer to the Truth may also refer to:

- Closer to the Truth (Tony Joe White album) (1991)
- Closer to the Truth (Trout Fishing in America album) (1999)

== See also ==
- Closer to Truth, an American documentary television series
