= Gone So Long =

Gone So Long can refer to:

- A track on the 2016 PAWS album No Grace
- A track on the 2011 Breathe Carolina album Hell Is What You Make It
- A track on the 1999 Sophie Zelmani album Time to Kill
- A track from the Blue Pills album Lady in Gold
