= Red pill (disambiguation) =

The red pill is a symbol used in the 1999 film The Matrix.

Red pill may also refer to:

- The Red Pill, a 2016 documentary film
- /r/TheRedPill, a manosphere-related subreddit
- The "red pill", a core belief of the manosphere
- Red Pill, a novel by Hari Kunzru
- "Redpill", a software patch in early versions of Windows 8

== See also ==
- Blue pill (disambiguation)
- Black pill (disambiguation)
- Black Pill Red Pill, a record label
- Red Pill Black, a website produced by Candace Owens
- Red Pill Blues, an album by the band Maroon 5
