= Blackpill (disambiguation) =

The blackpill is an ideology espoused by incels ("involuntary celibates").

Blackpill or Black Pill may also refer to:

- Blackpill, Swansea, Wales, a suburban area
- Black Pill, a 2024 book by journalist Elle Reeve

== See also ==
- Red pill (disambiguation)
- Blue pill (disambiguation)
- Black Pill Red Pill, an Australian record label
- Black Pilled, a 2021 EP by Smile Empty Soul
