= Jerry Carrigan =

American drummer and record producer (1943–2019)

Jerry Kirby Carrigan (September 13, 1943 – June 22, 2019) was an American drummer and record producer. Early in his career he was a member of the original Muscle Shoals Rhythm Section and later worked as a session musician in Nashville for over three decades. His style of drumming with a loose, deep-sounding snare drum melded country music with an R&B feel and helped develop a Nashville sound known as "Countrypolitan". His drumming is heard on many recordings which have become classics, some listed below. He recorded with Elvis Presley, Johnny Cash, Charley Pride, Jerry Lee Lewis, Ray Stevens, Kenny Rogers, George Jones and many others. He recorded with non-country artists as well, including Henry Mancini, Al Hirt, Johnny Mathis, and the Boston Pops Orchestra. In 2009 he was inducted into the "Nashville Cats", a cadre of top recording musicians chosen by the Country Music Hall of Fame. In 2010 he was inducted into the Alabama Music Hall of Fame. Carrigan was inducted into the Musicians Hall of Fame and Museum in 2019.

== Early years ==
Carrigan was born in Florence, Alabama, September 13, 1943. His mother, Elaine (Kirby) Carrigan, worked in a jewelry store and later owned a shoe shop. His father, Larry Carrigan, was a painting contractor who supported his son's interest in music and bought the youngster a set of drums. Jerry's first band was "Little Joe Allen and the Offbeats" an R&B cover band.

When Carrigan was 15, his father began recruiting boys to form a band with Jerry, his idea being that money could be made playing for college parties– four major universities were within an easy drive from Florence. It was then that Jerry first met David Briggs and Norbert Putnam who agreed to form a band. They called it the "Mark V" and Carrigan's father would become their booking agent and chauffeur. The young players developed their skills and gained experience as Larry drove them to various gigs in the southeast in a station wagon pulling a trailer full of band equipment. Eventually, when the boys were old enough to drive, Mr. Carrigan retired as driver, but continued booking the band. Jerry Carrigan attended Florence State College as an accounting major, but left school after two years to pursue music.

Carrigan and bandmates befriended Tom Stafford who had a rudimentary recording studio called "SPAR" in Florence over his father's drug store at the corner of Tennessee and Seminary St. Stafford had partnered with Rick Hall and Billy Sherrill in the SPAR (acronym for Stafford Publishing and Recording) business endeavor. Carrigan was first introduced to making demo recordings here. As time passed, more future talents frequented those rooms including Spooner Oldham, Terry Thompson, Dan Penn and Donnie Fritts. The two partners terminated Hall in 1960 and his humiliation motivated him to look for a new start as their competitor.

== FAME studios and the Muscle Shoals Rhythm Section ==
Rick Hall borrowed money and purchased an abandoned brick warehouse in Muscle Shoals, just across then Tennessee River from Florence. With primitive mono tape machines, he created FAME studios (an acronym for "Florence Alabama Music Enterprises") Hall's house band included Carrigan, Putnam and Briggs as the foundation of the rhythm section consisting of drums, bass and piano. Speaking of this trio, Carrigan said, "We laid the groundwork for the whole Muscle Shoals Rhythm and Blues Movement to begin.". The first hit was an R&B song, Arthur Alexander's "You Better Move On". This song was later covered by the Rolling Stones, Bobby Vee, the Hollies and others. Its success drew the attention of the recording industry. Atlanta producer Bill Lowery brought The Tams "What Kind of Fool (Do You Think I Am)", and Nashville's Felton Jarvis brought Tommy Roe ("Everybody") to record there.

Tommy Roe liked recording in Muscle Shoals at FAME studios; he had cut several successful songs there and usually returned every summer to record new material. In 1963, Roe had just done a European tour and his opening act was a then unknown band called "The Beatles". He said the Beatles were looking for a record deal and wanted Felton Jarvis to hear their tape which Roe had brought with him.

Before the recording session started, Jarvis, Rick Hall, Jerry Carrigan, Norbert Putnam and David Briggs gathered in the control room to listen to demo vocal by Paul McCartney. The recording had been made in a hotel room. Lennon and Harrison sang vocal harmonies, and a guitar was the only instrument. Roe told Carrigan and the other musicians about the tremendous reaction this band was getting at his concerts, stealing his show every night. The Muscle Shoals players listened but none was impressed and neither was Felton Jarvis. According to Norbert Putnam, "everyone frowned in sour disbelief". Jarvis said, "No, Tommy, I don't think so". Rick Hall turned off the tape after the first chorus.

One year later, Roe returned to Muscle Shoals for another session, about the time The Beatles' success exploded. Roe told the musicians that the Beatles were coming to the U.S. and wanted the Muscle Shoals boys to open for them. Carrigan said, "What are they willing to pay?" The answer was "a lot" and one month later, the musicians were on a plane to Washington, D.C. to open for The Beatles' first American concert on February 11, 1964, their role being the band to accompany Tommy Roe, the Righteous Brothers, and other acts preceding the Beatles' performance. The Muscle Shoals boys were invited to an exclusive party for the Beatles at the British Embassy but had to decline because Hall had them scheduled for recording sessions the next day.

Despite Muscle Shoals' success as an upstart studio, Nashville's pre-eminence as a center for top session musicians was well established. Nashville moguls Ray Stevens, Felton Jarvis, and Bob Beckham advised the Muscle Shoals Rhythm section players to come to Nashville, saying that Nashville studio musicians made about four times what Rick Hall was paying them. In 1965, they decided simultaneously to move to Nashville to assume individual careers there. This left Rick Hall without his hit-making musicians. He hired a new group of session players, later known affectionately as "The Swampers" consisting of Barry Beckett, Roger Hawkins, David Hood, Jimmy Johnson, who reached unprecedented success. They left Hall in 1969 to create their own competing Muscle Shoals studio, dubbing themselves "The Muscle Shoals Rhythm Section".

== Nashville ==
With the cachet of being one of the architects of the "Muscle Shoals Sound", Carrigan quickly got session bookings in Nashville. "People just put me right to work", he said. "The first year I was in Nashville, I did about ninety percent of the sessions that were done at RCA," Top producers such as Owen Bradley, Chet Atkins, and Billy Sherrill and Jerry Kennedy all hired him for record dates. He played on hits for some of the biggest country stars of the era – Charlie Rich, Ray Stevens, Charley Pride, George Jones, Tammy Wynette, Johnny Paycheck, Elvis Presley and Johnny Cash.

The growth of Nashville into a recording center during the 1970s began to draw non-country artists. Carrigan recorded with Henry Mancini, Joan Baez, the Boston Pops, Al Hirt, Johnny Mathis, Andy Williams and Tom Jones. Through his association with Nashville producer Larry Butler, he worked with Sammy Davis Jr., Don McLean, Nana Mouskouri, Kenny Rogers, Paul Anka, Bobby Vinton, Steve Lawrence/Eydie Gormé, Debby Boone, Wayne Newton, and John Denver.

== Musical style ==
In his memoir, The Man From Muscle Shoals, Rick Hall said, "Jerry was the first drummer I ever knew who could synchronize his kick and snare drum while simultaneously playing the open and closed sock cymbal"... "This technique was to become a Muscle Shoals trademark over the next two decades and remains so even today."

Carrigan was largely responsible for establishing the "big fat drum sound" associated with Nashville recordings during the 1970s. He said, "I started playing real loose, deep-sounding snare drums on country records. Billy Sherrill loved it. So I started experimenting with different things, different kinds of drums. I bought the first set of concert tom-toms that were in Nashville. I think that's one reason the producers liked my sound. I had a different approach." The New York Times said of Carrigan, "he was known for an approach that valued feeling over flash".

In February 2009 Carrigan was honored in the Country Music Hall of Fame and Museum’s ongoing Nashville Cats series, which pays tribute to veteran musicians who have proven integral to the city's role as the home of country music and one of the world's leading recording centers.

Carrigan died in Chattanooga, Tennessee, on June 22, 2019. According to former bandmate Norbert Putnam, he had been seriously ill for several years.

== Classic recordings ==
Carrigan performed on many notable recordings including:

- The Gambler – Kenny Rogers
- Only Daddy That'll Walk the Line – Waylon Jennings
- Middle Age Crazy – Jerry Lee Lewis
- Behind Closed Doors – Charlie Rich
- He Stopped Loving Her Today – George Jones
- Polk Salad Annie - Tony Joe White
- What Kind of Fool (Do You Think I Am) – The Tams
- Everybody – Tommy Roe
- Marie Laveau – Bobby Bare
- Everything is Beautiful – Ray Stevens
- Kiss an Angel Good Mornin' – Charley Pride

== Discography ==
- Just Because I'm a Woman - Dolly Parton (1968)
- Black and White - Tony Joe White (1969)
- My Blue Ridge Mountain Boy - Dolly Parton (1969)
- Tony Joe - Tony Joe White (1970)
- Yesterday's Wine - Willie Nelson (1971)
- Elvis Country (I'm 10,000 Years Old) - Elvis Presley (1971)
- Rock and Roll Resurrection - Ronnie Hawkins (1972)
- He Touched Me - Elvis Presley (1972)
- Raised on Rock / For Ol' Times Sake - Elvis Presley (1972)
- Where Are You Now, My Son? - Joan Baez (1972)
- My Tennessee Mountain Home - Dolly Parton (1973)
- Hank Wilson's Back Vol. I - Leon Russell (1973)
- Poor Man's Paradise - Mother Earth (1973)
- The Road - Johnny Rivers (1974)
- Jolene - Dolly Parton (1974)
- Giant of Rock 'n' Roll - Ronnie Hawkins (1974)
- Good Times - Elvis Presley (1974)
- Love Lifted Me - Kenny Rogers (1976)
- Regeneration - Roy Orbison (1976)
- Kenny Rogers - Kenny Rogers (1976)
- Daytime Friends - Kenny Rogers (1977)
- Amy Grant - Amy Grant (1977)
- From a Radio Engine to the Photon Wing - Michael Nesmith (1977)
- Love or Something Like It - Kenny Rogers (1978)
- The Gambler - Kenny Rogers (1978)
- Under the Eye - Dennis Linde (1978)
- Kenny - Kenny Rogers (1979)
- My Very Special Guests - George Jones (1979)
- American Son - Levon Helm (1980)
- Gideon - Kenny Rogers (1980)
- Some Days Are Diamonds - John Denver (1980)
- Both Sides of Love - Paul Anka (1981)
- Seasons of the Heart - John Denver (1982)
- It's About Time - John Denver (1983)
- Dreamland Express - John Denver (1985)
- One World - John Denver (1986)
- Christmas, Like a Lullaby - John Denver (1990)
