= ...Continued =

1969 studio album by Tony Joe White

Studio album by Tony Joe White
- Released: 1969
- Recorded: October 1968
- Studio: Monument Recording, Nashville, Tennessee; Lyn-Lou Studios
- Label: Monument
- Producer: Billy Swan

Tony Joe White chronology
Black and White (1968)	...Continued (1969)	Tony Joe (1970)

Singles from Black and White
- 1. "Roosevelt And Ira Lee" Released: 1969; 2. "Old Man Willis" Released: 1970

Alternative cover
- 1993 Reissue cover with new title (Roosevelt And Ira Lee)

Professional ratings
Review scores
Source	Rating
AllMusic	3/5 stars
Rolling Stone	(Positive)

...Continued is the second album released by Tony Joe White. It was released on Monument Records and contained the single "Roosevelt and Ira Lee" It was recorded at Monument Studios, Nashville and Lyn-Lou Studios, Memphis in 1969. It was produced by Billy Swan and engineered by Tommy Strong and Mort Thomasson.

The album was re-released on by Movieplay/Intermusic from Portugal in 1993 with a different cover and another title (Roosevelt And Ira Lee). In 1997 it was rereleased by Warner Brothers containing two additional songs - "Watching The Trains Go By" (by Dewey Oldham and Wallace Pennington) and "Old Man Willis" (by Tony Joe White himself) was the second single. "Old Man Willis" was later re-recorded for the album.

The album contained the track "Rainy Night In Georgia" popularized by R&B vocalist Brook Benton in 1970. It reached #4 on the Pop Singles and #2 on the Adult Contemporary charts, respectively. The RIAA certified the single gold for sales of one million copies. In 2004, it was ranked #498 on the List of Rolling Stone's 500 Greatest Songs of All Time.

The song has been covered by a number of musicians, including Ray Charles, Otis Rush, Randy Crawford, Tennessee Ernie Ford, Amos Garrett, Hank Williams, Jr., Shelby Lynne, John Holt, Nicky Thomas, by the duet of Conway Twitty and Sam Moore, Aaron Neville, and reggae band The Gladiators. Most recently indie folk-rock band Hem released a cover on No Word from Tom (2006). David Ruffin recorded a cover version of the song the same year as Benton; however, Motown for unknown reasons did not release the album. A dance version was recorded by Boozoo Bajou in 2006. "Elements And Things" was covered by Blues Pills on their second album Lady In Gold.

== Track listing ==
All tracks written by Tony Joe White.

Side one

1. "Elements And Things"
2. "Roosevelt And Ira Lee (Night Of The Mossacin)"
3. "Woodpecker"
4. "Rainy Night In Georgia"
5. "For Le Ann"

Side two

1. "Old Man Willis"
2. "Woman With Soul"
3. "I Want You"
4. "I Thought I Knew You Well"
5. "The Migrant"

== Personnel ==
- Tony Joe White - guitar, harmonica
- Tommy McClure – bass
- Sammy Creason – drums
- James Milhart – drums
- Mike Utley – organ
