= Tony Joe White (album) =

Studio album by Tony Joe White
- Released: 1971
- Recorded: December 1–12, 1970
- Studios: Sounds of Memphis Studio, Memphis; Ardent Recording Studio, Memphis
- Genres: Swamp rock; soul
- Label: Warner Bros.
- Producer: Peter Asher

Tony Joe White chronology
Tony Joe (1970)	Tony Joe White (1971)	The Train I'm On (1972)

Singles from Tony Joe White
- 1. "They Caught The Devil" Released: 1970; 2. "The Daddy" Released: 1971; 3. "I Just Walked Away" Released: 1971

Professional ratings
Review scores
Source	Rating
Allmusic	4.5/5 stars

Tony Joe White is the fourth album released by Tony Joe White, and the first he released for Warner Bros. Records. It was produced by Peter Asher and recorded between December 1–12, 1970 at Sounds of Memphis Studio and Ardent Recording Studio, Memphis (engineered by Terry Manning).

== Track listing ==
All tracks composed by Tony Joe White, except where indicated

Side one

1. "They Caught The Devil and Put Him in Jail in Eudora, Arkansas"
2. "The Change"
3. "My Kind of Woman"
4. "The Daddy"
5. "Black Panther Swamps"

Side two

1. "Five Summers For Jimmy"
2. "A Night in the Life of a Swamp Fox"
3. "Traveling Bone"
4. "I Just Walked Away"
5. "Copper Kettle" (Albert Frank Beddoe)
6. "Voodoo Village"

== Personnel ==
- Tony Joe White - guitar, harmonica
- Robert McGuffie - bass
- Sammy Creason - drums
- Mike Utley - piano, organ
- Memphis Horns:
  - Wayne Jackson - trumpet
  - Andrew Love - tenor saxophone
  - James Mitchell - baritone saxophone
  - Jack Hale - trombone
  - Louis Collins - tenor
  - Roger Hopps - trumpet
- String arrangements by Roger Hopps
- Horn arrangements by the Memphis Horns
