= Homemade Ice Cream =

Studio album by Tony Joe White
- Released: 1973
- Recorded: 1973
- Studio: Quad Studio
- Label: Warner Brothers
- Producer: Tony Joe White, Tom Dowd

Tony Joe White chronology
The Train I'm On (1972)	Homemade Ice Cream (1973)	Eyes (1976)

Singles from Tony Joe White
- 1. "Backwoods Preacher Man" Released: 1973

Professional ratings
Review scores
Source	Rating
Allmusic	3/5 stars

Homemade Ice Cream is the sixth album released by Tony Joe White, and the third he released for Warner Brothers. It was produced by White and Tom Dowd.

== Track listing ==
All tracks composed by Tony Joe White

Side one

1. "Saturday Nite, In Oak Grove, Louisiana" 2:13
2. "For Ol' Times Sake" 3:47
3. "I Want Love ('Tween You and Me)" 2:42
4. "Homemade Ice Cream" 3:12
5. "Ol' Mother Earth" 3:07

Side two

1. "Lazy" 3:48
2. "California on My Mind" 3:44
3. "Backwoods Preacher Man" 2:47
4. "Takin' the Midnight Train" 4:06
5. "No News Is Good News" 3:02
6. "Did Somebody Make a Fool out of You" 4:15

== Personnel ==
- Tony Joe White - lead vocals, guitar, harmonica
- Reggie Young - guitar
- David Briggs - piano, organ
- Norbert Putnam - bass
- Kenny Malone - drums
