= Tony Joe =

Studio album by Tony Joe White
- Released: 1970
- Recorded: February–April 1970
- Studios: Monument Recording; Lyn-Lou Studios; RCA Victor, Nashville, Tennessee
- Label: Monument
- Producer: Billy Swan

Tony Joe White chronology
...Continued (1969)	Tony Joe (1970)	Tony Joe White (1971)

Singles from Tony Joe
- 1. "High Sheriff of Calhoun Parrish" Released: 1970; 2. "Save Your Sugar For Me" Released: 1970

Alternative cover
- 1993 Reissue cover with new title (Groupy Girl)

Professional ratings
Review scores
Source	Rating
Allmusic	4/5 stars
Christgau's Record Guide	C+

Tony Joe was the third studio album released by Tony Joe White. It was released on Monument Records and contained the singles "High Sheriff of Calhoun Parrish" and "Save Your Sugar For Me". It was recorded at RCA Victor Studios, Nashville and Lyn-Lou Studios, Memphis in 1970. It was produced by Billy Swan. A mixture of original recordings and covers, it featured White's versions of "Hard To Handle" made popular by Otis Redding and "Boom Boom" by John Lee Hooker.

The album was re-released on by Movieplay/Intermusic from Portugal in 1993 with a different cover and another title (Groupy Girl). In 1997 it was rereleased by Warner Brothers containing two additional songs - "I Protest" (by Wayne Carson) and "A Man Can Only Stand So Much Pain" (Mickey Newbury).

== Critical reception ==
Reviewing in Christgau's Record Guide: Rock Albums of the Seventies (1981), Robert Christgau wrote: "Because he sticks to his roots, White has those who don't trust rock-as-art all hot and bothered. Well, I don't trust rock-as-art myself, but I don't trust these bayou set pieces either. White's tales of spiders, widders, conjure wimmin, and wayward rich girls all sound like I've seen them on television, only there they had endings. Nor do the Otis Redding and Junior Walker covers teach me anything new. The John Lee Hooker is better. As are 'Save Your Sugar for Me,' about teenage sex, and 'Stockholm Blues,' about a songwriter from the bayous who goes somewhere in an airplane."

== Track listing ==
All tracks composed by Tony Joe White, except where indicated

Side one

1. "Stud-Spider"
2. "High Sheriff of Calhoun Parrish"
3. "Widow Wimberly"
4. "Conjure Woman"
5. "Save Your Sugar For Me"
6. "Groupy Girl" (not on the U.S. version of the album, also spelled "Groupie Girl")

Side two

1. "Hard to Handle" (Otis Redding, Alvertis Isbell, Allen Jones)
2. "What Does It Take (to Win Your Love)" (Vernon Bullock, Johnny Bristol, Harvey Fuqua)
3. "My Friend" (Donnie Fritts, Spooner Oldham)
4. "Stockholm Blues"
5. "Boom Boom" (John Lee Hooker)

== Personnel ==
- Tony Joe White – guitar, harmonica
- Norbert Putnam – bass
- Mike Utley – organ
- Jerry Carrigan – drums
- Tommy McClure – bass
- David Briggs – organ
- Sammy Creason – drums
- The Nashville Horns & Strings – horns and strings
