= The Train I'm On =

Studio album by Tony Joe White
- Released: 1972
- Recorded: 1972
- Studio: Muscle Shoals Sound, Muscle Shoals
- Genre: Swamp rock
- Label: Warner Brothers
- Producer: Jerry Wexler, Tom Dowd

Tony Joe White chronology
| Tony Joe White (1971) | The Train I'm On (1972) | Homemade Ice Cream (1973) |

Singles from Tony Joe White
- 1. "I've Got a Thing About You Baby" Released: 1972; 2. "Even Trolls Rock'n'Roll" Released: 1972; 3. "If I Ever Saw a Good Thing" Released: 1972

Professional ratings
Review scores
| Source | Rating |
|---|---|
| Allmusic | 4.5/5 stars |

The Train I'm On is the fifth album released by Tony Joe White, and the second he released for Warner Brothers. It was produced by Jerry Wexler and Tom Dowd and recorded in 1972 at Muscle Shoals Sound Studio, Muscle Shoals, Alabama.

== Track listing ==
All tracks composed by Tony Joe White, except where indicated

Side one

1. "I've Got a Thing About You Baby" 2:42
2. "The Family" (John Hurley, Ronnie Wilkins) 3:30
3. "If I Ever Saw a Good Thing" 3:21
4. "Beouf River Road" 3:20
5. "The Train I'm On" 3:09
6. "Even Trolls Love Rock and Roll" 4:56

Side two

1. "As the Crow Flies" 3:50
2. "Take Time to Love" (Donnie Fritts, Tony Joe White) 3:02
3. "300 Pounds of Hongry" (Donnie Fritts, Eddie Hinton) 2:44
4. "The Migrant" 4:00
5. "Sidewalk Hobo" 3:54
6. "The Gospel Singer" 3:32

== Personnel ==
- Tony Joe White - guitar, harmonica
- Tippy Armstrong - guitar
- John Hughey - pedal steel guitar
- David Hood - bass guitar
- Roger Hawkins - drums
- Barry Beckett - piano, clavinet, organ
- Ronnie Barron - organ, electric piano, vibes, congas
- Charles Chalmers - saxophone
- String arrangements by Arif Mardin
- Background vocal arrangements by Tom Dowd
- Background vocals:
  - Charles Chalmers
  - Donna Rhodes
  - Sandy Rhodes
  - Terry Woodford
  - George Soulé
  - Jerry Masters
