= Black and White (Tony Joe White album) =

Studio album by Tony Joe White
- Released: 1969
- Recorded: 1968
- Studio: RCA Victor Studios, Nashville
- Genre: Swamp rock
- Label: Monument
- Producer: Billy Swan

Tony Joe White chronology
Black and White (1969)	...Continued (1969)

Singles from Black and White
- 1. "Soul Francisco" Released: 1968; 2. "Polk Salad Annie" Released: 1968; 3. "Little Green Apples" Released: 1969

Alternative cover
- 1993 Reissue cover with new title (Polk Salad Annie)

Professional ratings
Review scores
Source	Rating
Allmusic	3.5/5 stars
Rolling Stone	(favorable)

Black and White was the first album released by Tony Joe White. It contained the single "Polk Salad Annie" which was a staple of Elvis Presley's live sets in the 1970s. It was recorded at RCA Victor Studios, Nashville and produced by Billy Swan.

"Polk Salad Annie"'s lyrics describe the lifestyle of a generic poor Southern girl. Traditionally, the term to describe the type of food highlighted in the song is "poke salad." Its 1968 single release peaked at #8 on the Billboard Hot 100.

The single, released by Monument Records, had been out nine months before it finally charted, and had been written off by Monument as a failure. Said White: "They had done given up on it, but we kept getting all these people in Texas coming to the clubs and buying the record. So we would send up to Nashville saying, 'Send us a thousand more this week.' They would send us these 'Do Not Sell' examples, so we would have to sit down and mark out the 'Do Not Sell' and then send them to the record stores. All these stores in South Texas kept calling our house saying, 'We need more.' So we just kept hanging on. And finally a guy in L.A. picked it up and got it across. Otherwise, 'Polk' could have been lost forever."

The song vividly recreates the Southern roots of White's childhood and his music reflects this earthy rural background. As a child he listened not only to local bluesmen and country singers but also to the Cajun music of Louisiana, that rare hybrid of traditional musical styles introduced by French settlers at the turn of the century.

His roots lie in the swamplands of Oak Grove, Louisiana, where he was born in 1943. Situated just west of the Mississippi River, it's a land of cottonfields, where polk salad grows wild and alligators lurk in moss-covered swamps. "I spent the first 18 years of my life down there," said White "My folks raised cotton and corn. There were lotsa times when there weren't too much to eat, and I ain't ashamed to admit that we've often whipped up a mess of polk salad. Tastes alright too.. a bit like spinach."

== Track listing ==
All tracks composed by Tony Joe White, except where indicated

Side one

1. "Willie and Laura Mae Jones"
2. "Soul Francisco"
3. "Aspen Colorado"
4. "Whompt Out On You"
5. "Don't Steal My Love"
6. "Polk Salad Annie"

Side two

1. "Who's Making Love" (Homer Banks, Bettye Crutcher, Don Davis, Raymond Jackson)
2. "Scratch My Back" (James Moore)
3. "Little Green Apples" (Bobby Russell)
4. "Wichita Lineman" (Jimmy Webb)
5. "Look of Love" (Burt Bacharach, Hal David)

== Personnel ==
Musicians

- Tony Joe White - vocals, guitar, harmonica
- David Briggs - piano, organ
- Jerry Carrigan – drums
- Norbert Putnam – bass
- Chip Young – guitar
- Jimmy Isbell – drums: Side #2 Song 2
- Uncredited - Brass Instruments on "Polk Salad Annie".

Arrangers

- Bergen White - Side #1: Songs 1&6, Side #2: Songs 1,4,5,6
- Cam Mullins - Side #1: Song 3

Engineer: Al Pachucki

Art Direction/Photography: Ken Kim

== Reissues ==
Black and White was re-released on by Movieplay/Intermusic from Portugal in 1993 with a different cover and a different title ("Polk Salad Annie").

It was reissued in 1997 by Warner Bros. containing two additional songs - "Ten More Miles To Louisiana" (Tony Joe White) and "Georgia Pines" (by Buddy Buie and John Rainey Adkins).
