= Lady in Gold (album) =

Studio album by Blues Pills
- Released: August 5, 2016
- Recorded: 2015–2016
- Genre: Psychedelic soul; soul; rhythm and blues; blues rock
- Length: 40:08
- Label: Nuclear Blast Records
- Producer: Don Alsterberg

Blues Pills chronology
Blues Pills (2014)	Lady in Gold (2016)	Holy Moly! (2020)

Singles from Lady in Gold
- 1. "Lady in Gold"

Lady in Gold is the second studio album by Swedish rock band Blues Pills. It was released on August 5, 2016, by Nuclear Blast Records. Lady in Gold consists of ten tracks including a cover of Tony Joe White's "Elements and Things" from the 1969 album ...Continued.

== Promotion and pre-release ==
In late 2015, the band started writing and preparing for their second album—their first with new drummer André Kvarnström. In November 2015, Elin Larsson posted a photo to the band Facebook page of her recording the vocals for the second album. The band then went on a two-month Europe tour between February and April 2016 before finalising the work for the second album.

On 22 April 2016, Blues Pills announced the title of the album and the ten track set-list via their Facebook page. Vocalist and co-songwriter Elin Larsson commented: "Lady gold is a character who symbolizes death. We wanted a twist on the typical stereotype of death being the grim reaper. So instead we made her a lady in gold." The band were happy to reveal that Don Alsterberg (Graveyard, Division of Laura Lee and Jerry Williams) once again took the production role of the album.

Bassist, founding member and main songwriter Zach Anderson commented on the artwork of the album: "The design comes from the dutch artist Marijke Koger-Dunham who already worked with us for the first album cover. We are super proud to have the opportunity to work again with such a legendary artist who has even worked with The Beatles, Cream and many more. The original design was made by her 50 years ago. We worked together to adapt the colors to fit the mood of the album. Hopefully our fans will like it as much as we do."

== Track listing ==
All songs written and composed by Elin Larsson, Dorian Sorriaux, Zach Anderson and André Kvarnström (except where noted). All lyrics by Zach Anderson and Elin Larsson except track 4/"I Felt a Change" by Elin Larsson.

No.	Title	Length
1.	"Lady in Gold"	4:32
2.	"Little Boy Preacher"	3:36
3.	"Burned Out"	4:33
4.	"I Felt a Change"	3:58
5.	"Gone So Long"	4:17
6.	"Bad Talkers"	3:11
7.	"You Gotta Try"	3:39
8.	"Won't Go Back"	3:56
9.	"Rejection"	3:34
10.	"Elements and Things" (Tony Joe White)	4:47
Total length:		40:08

== Personnel ==
Blues Pills

- Elin Larsson – vocals
- Dorian Sorriaux – guitars, acoustic guitar
- Zach Anderson – bass
- André Kvarnström – drums

Additional personnel

- Tobias Winterkorn – Mellotron
- Rickard Nygren – organ
- Per Larsson – piano
- Carl Lindvall, Elin Larsson, Ellinor Svensson, Sofie Lee Johansson – choir (Voodoo Chor)
- Francis Rencoret – vocal arrangements (on tracks 1, 5 and 10)
- Don Alsterberg – xylophone

Production

- Don Alsterberg – production, recording, mixing
- Marijke Koger-Dunham – cover design
- Hans Olsson Brookes – mastering
- Kiryk Drewinski – logo design, layout, typography
- John McMurtrie – photography

== Charts ==
Chart (2016)	Peak position
Austrian Albums (Ö3 Austria)	12
Belgian Albums (Ultratop Flanders)	27
Belgian Albums (Ultratop Wallonia)	21
Dutch Albums (Album Top 100)	68
Finnish Albums (Suomen virallinen lista)	6
French Albums (SNEP)	55
German Albums (Offizielle Top 100)	1
Norwegian Albums (VG-lista)	36
Portuguese Albums (AFP)	48
Scottish Albums (OCC)	14
Spanish Albums (PROMUSICAE)	99
Swedish Albums (Sverigetopplistan)	27
Swiss Albums (Schweizer Hitparade)	2
UK Albums (OCC)	31

== Critical reception ==
Professional ratings
Aggregate scores
Source	Rating
Metacritic	73/100
Review scores
Source	Rating
AllMusic	4/5 stars

The album received generally favorable reviews.

AllMusic writer, Thom Jurek states in conclusion, "(the album) [...] goes way past the band's self-titled debut" and it "delivers on the promise of that first album and then some". Jurek calls the songwriting "more sophisticated, diverse, and confident".
