= Polk Salad Annie =

Single by Tony Joe White

from the album Black and White
- B-side: "Aspen Colorado"
- Released: June 1969
- Recorded: May 16, 1968
- Studio: RCA Studio B, Nashville, Tennessee
- Genre: Swamp rock
- Length: 3:37
- Label: Monument
- Songwriter: Tony Joe White
- Producer: Billy Swan

Tony Joe White singles chronology
"Soul Francisco" (1969)	"Polk Salad Annie" (1969)	"Roosevelt and Ira Lee" (1969)

Official audio
- "Polk Salad Annie" on YouTube

"Polk Salad Annie" is a 1968 song written and performed by Tony Joe White. Its lyrics describe the lifestyle of a poor rural Southern girl and her family. Traditionally, the term to describe the type of food highlighted in the song is polk or poke salad, a dish of cooked greens made from pokeweed. Its 1969 single release peaked at No. 8 on the Billboard Hot 100. In Canada, the song made No. 10 on the RPM Magazine Hot Singles chart. Elvis Presley's version from his 1970 live album On Stage also made the song popular.

== Song ==
The song is intended to recreate the Southern roots of Tony Joe White's childhood and his music reflects this earthy rural background. As a child he listened not only to local bluesmen and country singers but also to the Cajun music of Louisiana, the hybrid of traditional musical styles introduced by French settlers at the turn of the century.

His roots lie in the swamplands of Oak Grove, Louisiana, where he was born in 1943. Situated just west of the Mississippi River, it's a land of cottonfields, where pokeweed, or "poke" grows wild, and alligators lurk in moss-covered swamps. "I spent the first 18 years of my life down there", said White. "My folks raised cotton and corn. There were lotsa times when there weren't too much to eat, and I ain't ashamed to admit that we've often whipped up a mess of poke sallet. Tastes alright too — a bit like spinach." In the song, after gathering the leaves, Annie drags them home in a 'tote sack'. She “made the alligators look tame”; though they “got [her] granny”. Her mother worked in a chain gang, while her father was lazy and no-count, with a bad back, and her brothers were stealing the watermelons out of the narrator's truck patch. The song's intro is spoken, as well as the lines between the chorus, the other two verses, and the outro. White makes grunting and other nonsensical noises, especially towards the ending of the instrumental as well as the outro.

In a January 17, 2014, interview with music journalist Ray Shasho, White explained the thought process behind the writing of "Polk Salad Annie" and "Rainy Night in Georgia".

I heard "Ode to Billie Joe" on the radio and I thought, man, how real, because I am Billie Joe, I know that life. I've been in the cotton fields. So I thought if I ever tried to write, I'm going to write about something I know about. At that time I was doing a lot of Elvis and John Lee Hooker onstage with my drummer. No original songs and I hadn't really thought about it. But after I heard Bobbie Gentry I sat down and thought … well I know about polk because I had ate a bunch of it and I knew about rainy nights because I spent a lot of rainy nights in Marietta, Georgia. So I was real lucky with my first tries to write something that was not only real and hit pretty close to the bone, but lasted that long. So it was kind of a guide for me then on through life to always try to write what I know about.

== Background ==
The single, released in 1969 by Monument Records, had been out nine months before it finally charted, and had been written off by Monument as a failure. Said White: "They had done given up on it, but we kept getting all these people in Texas coming to the clubs and buying the record. So we would send up to Nashville saying, 'Send us a thousand more this week.' They would send us these 'Do Not Sell' examples, so we would have to sit down and mark out the 'Do Not Sell' and then send them to the record stores. All these stores in South Texas kept calling our house saying, 'We need more.' So we just kept hanging on. And finally a guy in L.A. picked it up and got it across. Otherwise, 'Poke' could have been lost forever."

In 2014, White performed the song with Dave Grohl and the Foo Fighters on Late Show With David Letterman.

== Personnel ==
- Tony Joe White – vocals, guitar
- Jerry Carrigan – drums
- David Briggs – organ
- Norbert Putnam – bass
- (Uncredited) Brass Instruments

== Chart history ==
=== Weekly charts ===
Chart (1969)	Peak position
Australia Go-Set	8
Canada RPM Top Singles	10
South Africa (Springbok)	18
US Billboard Hot 100	8
US Cash Box Top 100	9

=== Year-end charts ===
Chart (1969)	Rank
US Billboard Hot 100	77

== Elvis Presley cover ==
Elvis Presley picked up the song, and it became a staple of his live performances during the 1970s. Not a studio recording, but his February 1970 live recording became the only version of "Polk Salad Annie" to chart in the UK and Ireland.

=== Chart history ===
Chart (1973)	Peak position
Ireland (IRMA)	16
UK Singles (Official Charts)	23

Presley's rendition was issued on several albums, including:

  - On Stage (RCA Victor, 1970),
  - Elvis: That's the Way It Is (documentary film, 1970),
  - As Recorded at Madison Square Garden (RCA Victor, 1972),
  - Elvis on Tour (documentary film, 1972),
  - Walk a Mile in My Shoes: The Essential '70s Masters (RCA Records, 1995),
  - Elvis 75 (RCA Records),
  - Best of Artist of the Century (RCA Records),
  - EPiC: Elvis Presley in Concert (documentary film and soundtrack, 2026)

Though not on the Elvis Recorded Live on Stage in Memphis (1974) album, it was put on the legacy edition of that album in 2014; the song was performed at the concert from which the album was taken. It featured a rare fuzz bass solo by Jerry Scheff. Tony Joe White reportedly liked Presley's interpretation of the song.

== Cover versions ==
- Richard "Groove" Holmes, live, on his 1970 album Recorded Live at the Lighthouse.
- Clarence Reid on his 1969 album Dancin' with Nobody but You Babe.
- Tom Jones released a version on his 1970 album Tom, recorded in February 1970.
- White did a duet with Johnny Cash on the April 8, 1970, edition of The Johnny Cash Show. This performance has been released on DVD on The Best of the Johnny Cash Show.
- Los Lonely Boys on their 2009 tribute EP entitled 1969.
- Conan O'Brien on his Legally Prohibited from Being Funny on Television Tour. He mentions that Presley sang the song on his tour as well.
- Rockabilly artist Sleepy LaBeef on his album Rockabilly 1977; he also included it on his 2000 album Tomorrow Never Comes.
- Johnny Hallyday did a live duet performance with White during his 1984 tour in Nashville.
- American-born French singer Joe Dassin on his album, Blue Country, released in 1979.
- Harald Schmidt on September 13, 2011 during his late night show on German TV, Harald Schmidt.
- Dutch Mason on his album Wish Me Luck (1979).
- Big Twist and the Mellow Fellows on their 1983 album, Playing For Keeps.
- Peabody College instructor Gil Trythall on his 1973 electronic music album Nashville Gold (Switched on Moog).
- Tony Joe White and Foo Fighters on the Late Show With David Letterman (season 22, episode 35), originally airing on October 15, 2014.
- Jimmie Van Zant on his 2008 album My Name Is Jimmie.
- The BossHoss on their album Stallion Battalion released in 2007.
- Dan Aykroyd and Jim Belushi have a version on their 2003 album Have Love Will Travel.
- A 1971 James Burton cover is featured in the 2019 movie Ford v Ferrari.
