= Blues Pills (album) =

Studio album by Blues Pills
- Released: July 24, 2014
- Recorded: 2014 at Gothenburg, Sweden
- Genre: Blues rock; psychedelic rock; hard rock
- Length: 42:49
- Label: Nuclear Blast Records
- Producer: Don Alsterberg

Blues Pills chronology
Devil Man EP (2013)	Blues Pills (2014)	Lady in Gold (2016)

Singles from Blues Pills
- 1. "High Class Woman" Released: July 28, 2014; 2. "No Hope Left For Me" Released: November 6, 2014

Blues Pills is the debut studio album by Swedish rock band Blues Pills, released on July 25, 2014 by Nuclear Blast Records. The album consists of ten tracks including some re-recorded releases from previous EPs and a cover of the Chubby Checker song Gypsy. Two singles were released, High Class Woman and No Hope Left For Me, and both songs had music videos by Nuclear Blast.

== Reception ==
Professional ratings
Review scores
Source	Rating
Sputnikmusic	4/5 stars
Planet Mosh	5/5 stars

Many reviews praise the improvement on the re-recording of the tracks that had previously appeared on EPs. Reviews mention the sound and style comparing to 60s blues and 70s rock influences. The album received predominantly positive online professional reviews.

== Track listing ==
All songs written and composed by Elin Larsson, Dorian Sorriaux, and Zach Anderson (except where noted)

No.	Title	Length
1.	"High Class Woman"	4:29
2.	"Ain't No Change"	4:59
3.	"Jupiter"	4:07
4.	"Black Smoke"	5:09
5.	"River"	4:24
6.	"No Hope Left For Me"	3:54
7.	"Devil Man"	3:07
8.	"Astralplane"	4:40
9.	"Gypsy (Ernest Evans)"	3:09
10.	"Little Sun"	4:51
Total length:		42:49

== Personnel ==
Blues Pills

- Elin Larsson – vocals
- Dorian Sorriaux – electric and acoustic guitars
- Zach Anderson – bass guitar
- Cory Berry – drums, percussion

Additional personnel

- Don Alsterberg – production, mixing, recording
- Joel Westberg – Additional percussion
- Hans Olsson-Brookes – mastering
- Marijke Koger-Dunham – cover design
- Kiryk Drewinski – layout, illustration
