= Blues Pills =

Swedish rock band

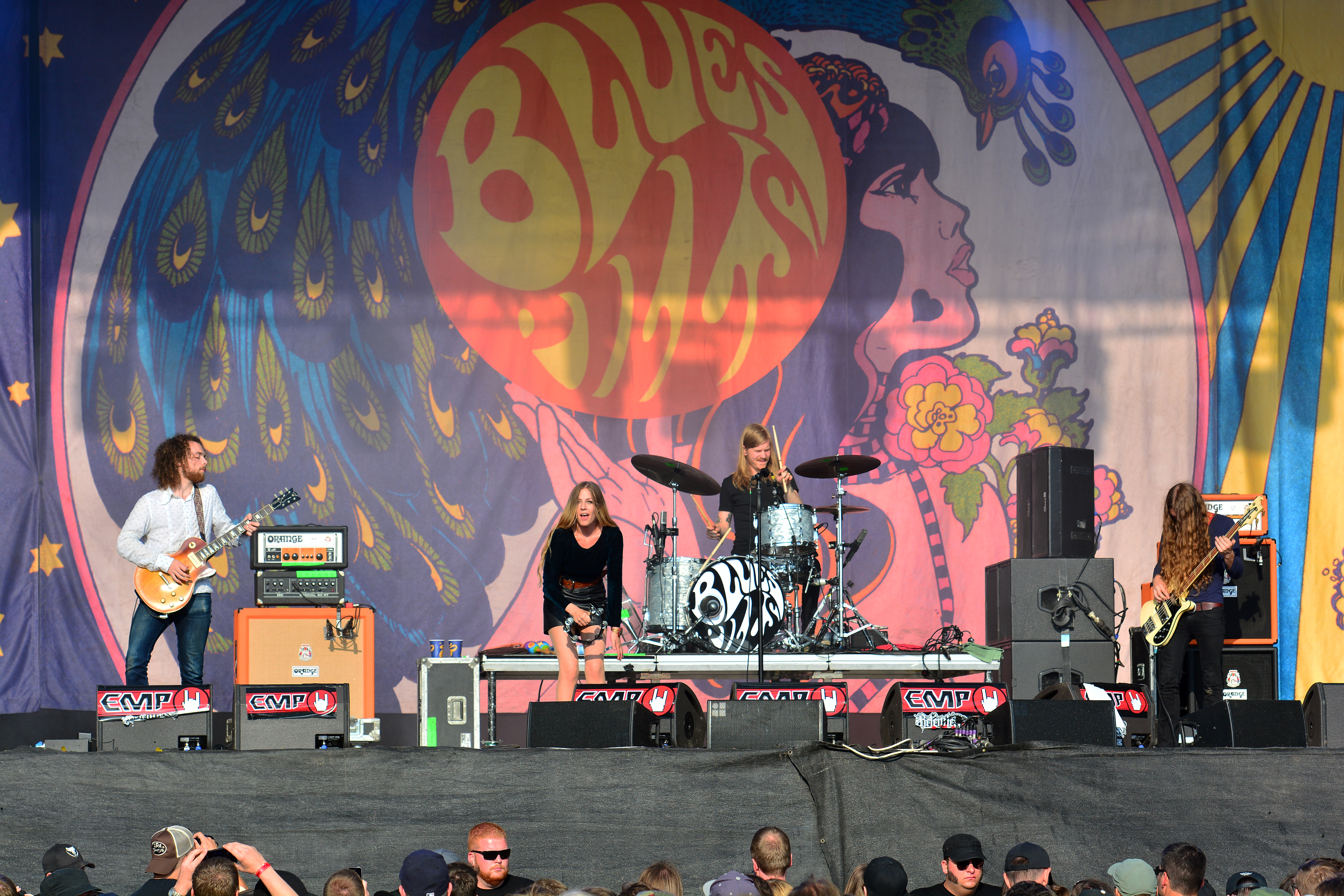
- Blues Pills performing at Reload Festival in 2015

Background information
- Origin: Örebro, Sweden
- Genres: Hard rock, blues rock, psychedelic rock
- Years active: 2011–present
- Labels: Crusher, Nuclear Blast
- Members: Elin Larsson; Zack Anderson; André Kvarnström; Kristoffer Schander
- Past members: Cory Berry; Dorian Sorriaux
- Website: bluespills.com

Blues Pills are a Swedish rock band, formed in Örebro in 2011. The band has released four studio albums, two EPs, three live albums and five singles since its formation. Their latest studio album, Birthday, was released in August 2024 through BMG.

== History ==
=== Formation and EPs (2011–2013) ===
In 2011, step-brothers Zack Anderson (bass) and Cory Berry (drums) of the band Radio Moscow met singer Elin Larsson while touring in California. Together they recorded two demo tracks and published them on YouTube, after which label "Crusher Records" offered them a deal. The band toured to Spain and France, where they met 16-year-old guitarist Dorian Sorriaux, whom they invited to Örebro and made a member of the band. The name of the band came from their friend, Jens Heide, who had a music blog called BluesPillz with obscure 60s and 70s underground music.

In May 2012 they released an EP called "Bliss", followed by the "Black Smoke" single in July. The band toured extensively during 2013 with appearances in Berlin's "Desertfest" in April, in Bad Kötzting's "Void Fest" and Geel's "Yellowstock Festival" in August, in Bonn's "Crossroads Festival" in October and Melbourne's "Cherry Rock Festival" in November 2013.

In July 2013, Blues Pills signed a contract with Nuclear Blast Records and released their "Devil Man" EP in October . Their appearance at the "Crossroads Festival" was recorded and released in the form of the "Live at Rockpalast" EP in March 2014.

=== The self-titled debut album and Lady in Gold (2014–2017) ===
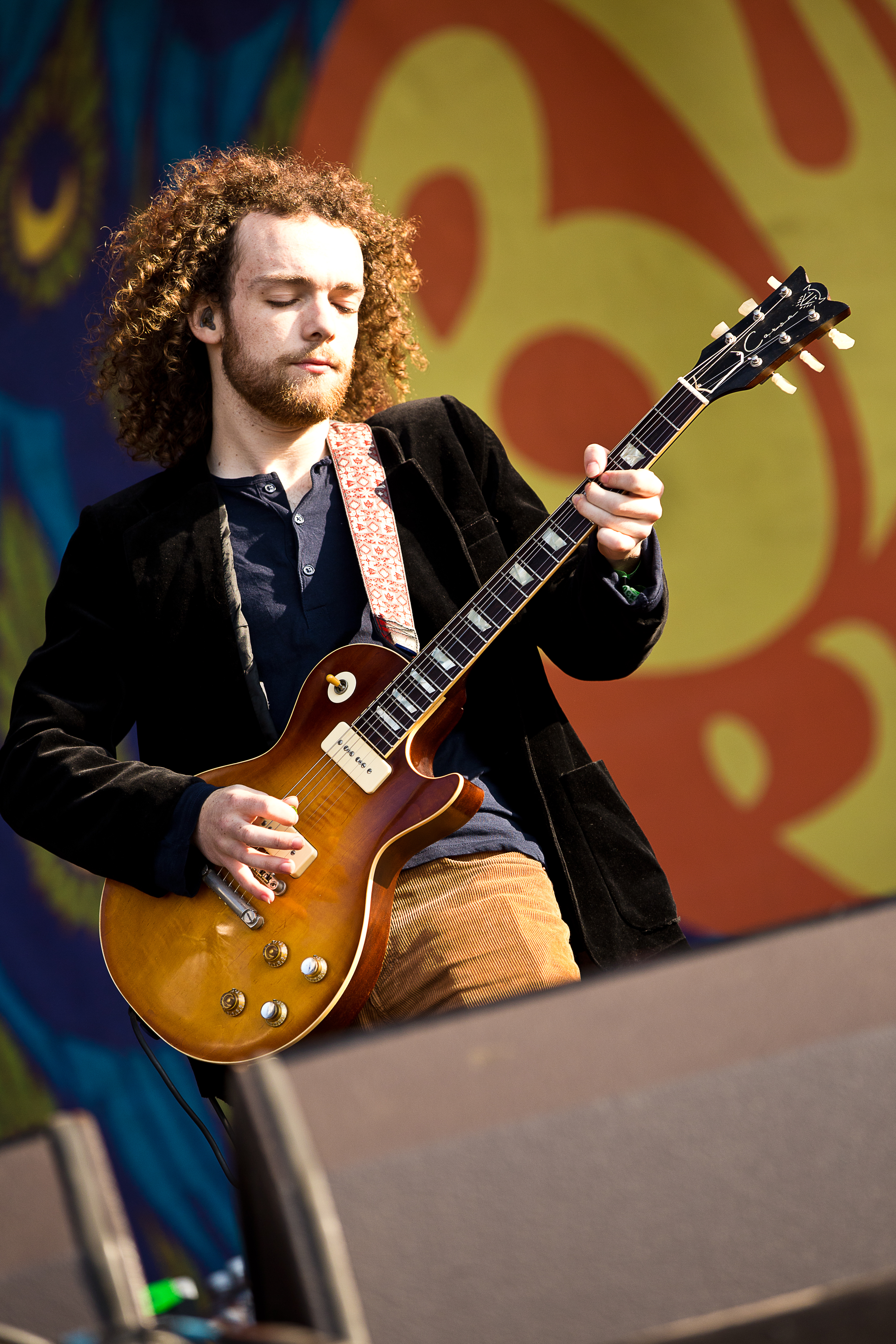
Guitarist Dorian Sorriaux left the band in 2018.

In July 2014 they released their first album, Blues Pills, the special edition of which included a DVD of their appearance in the "Hammer of Doom" festival from the year before. Shortly after the release of the first album, Cory Berry was replaced with new drummer André Kvarnström.

In mid-2014 they appeared in the "Sweden Rock Festival", in Gelsenkirchen's "Rock Hard Festival" in June and in the famous Montreux Jazz Festival in July 2014.

The album became successful in Europe, climbing to No. 4 in Germany and No. 10 in Switzerland, while it also reached British charts at No. 68.

During the end of 2015 and the start of 2016, the band started writing and recording their second album. On 22 April 2016, Blues Pills announced that Lady in Gold would be released on 5 August 2016 through Nuclear Blast with a ten track set-list.

In 2016, Blues Pills toured with Kadavar, play festivals in the summer in North America and Europe followed by a UK tour in November.

A live album Lady in Gold Live in Paris was announced with a release date of 3 November 2017.

=== Departure of Dorian Sorriaux and Holy Moly! (2018–present) ===
In November 2018 the band announced the peaceful departure of guitarist Dorian Sorriaux via a post on their Facebook page. Work on a third album will continue, with Zack Anderson moving to guitar. In October 2019, it was announced that Kristoffer Schander would be joining on the bass guitar, in the same post, they have also announced that they were working on their third studio album, set to be released in 2020.

On 6 March 2020, the band released the first single of their third album, "Proud Woman", in the same video, they announced their upcoming third studio album is titled Holy Moly!. On 10 April 2020, they released their second single from the upcoming album titled "Low Road" which was accompanied by an official music video. On 10 July 2020, they released the third and final single titled "Kiss By Past Goodbye". Holy Moly! was originally meant to be released on 19 June 2020 but was postponed to 21 August 2020 due to the COVID-19 pandemic.

In March, on 9 March 2026, the band released a statement, that the bass player Kristoffer Schander will be leaving the band immideatly.

On 5 November 2026, the departure of drummer André Kvarnström was announced on social media. It was said, Kvarnström wanted something different after playing with the band for more than a decade. His last show will be on 5 December in Helsinki with their joint tour with Graveyard.

== Band members ==
Current

- Elin Larsson – vocals (2011–present)
- Zack Anderson – bass (2011–2019), guitars (2019–present)
- André Kvarnström – drums (2014–present)
- Agnes Roslund – bass (2026–present)

Former

- Cory Berry – drums (2011–2014)
- Dorian Sorriaux – guitars (2011–2018)
- Kristoffer Schander – bass (2019–2026)

Support

- Rickard Nygren – guitars, organ (2016–present)

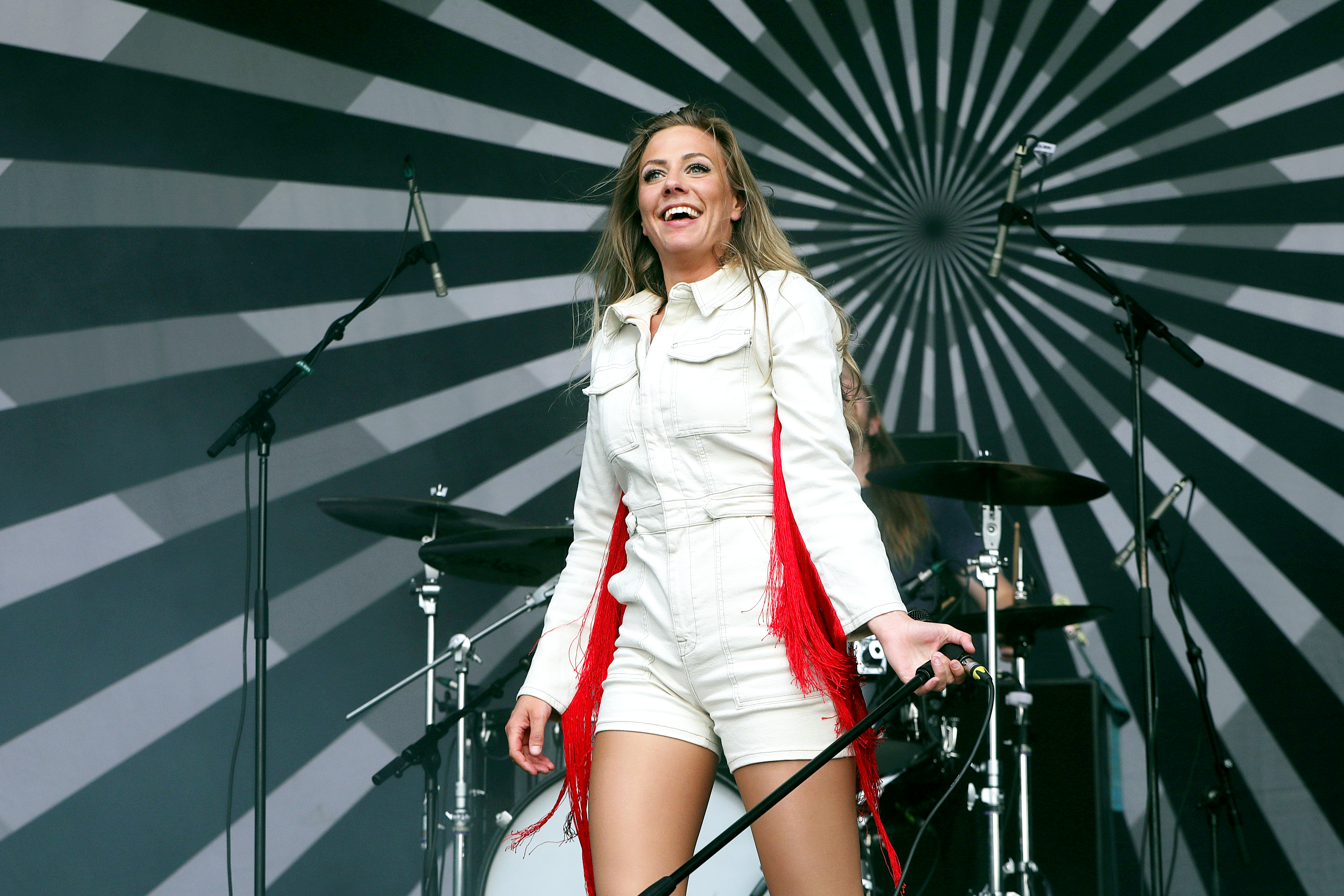
Elin Larsson

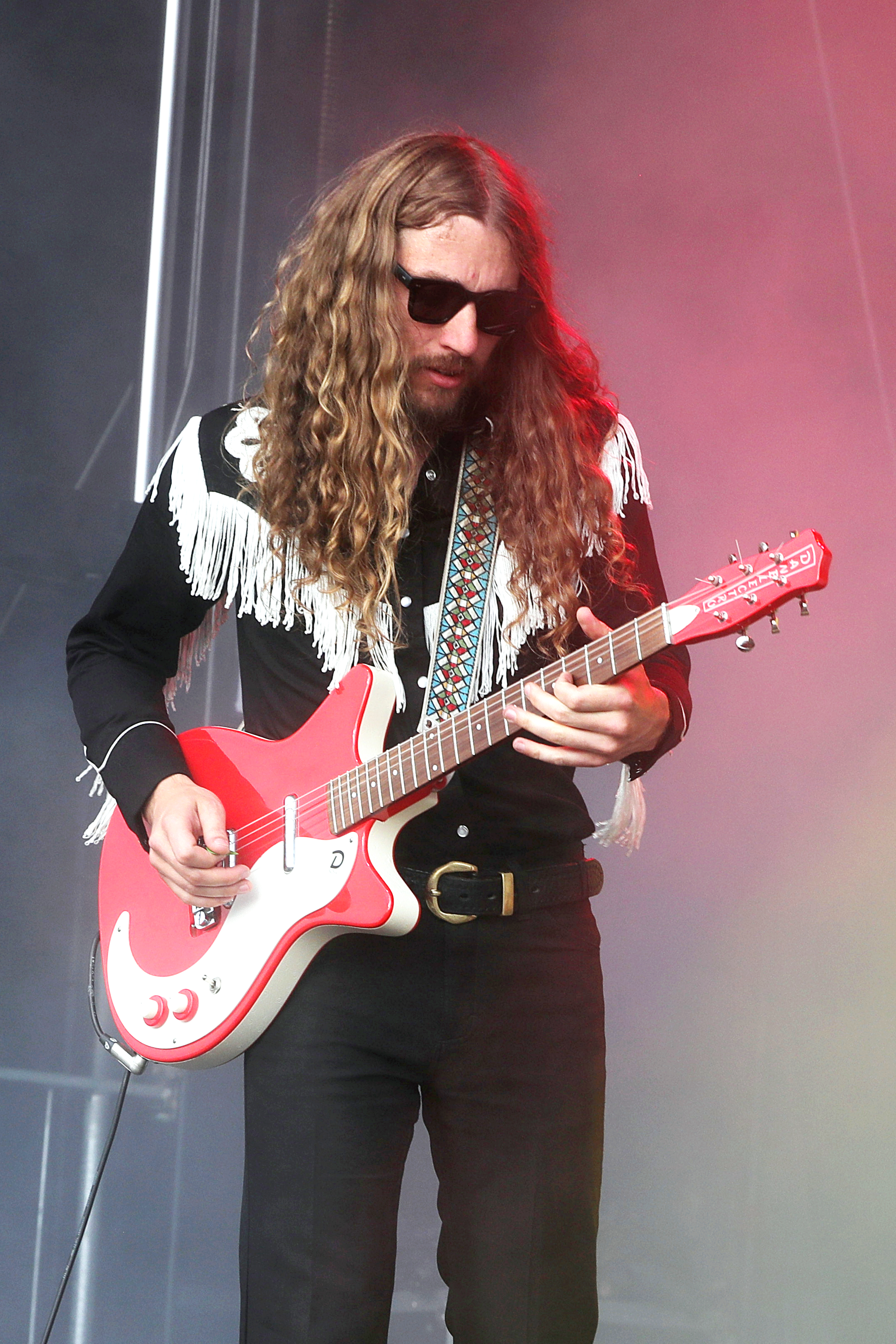
Zach Anderson

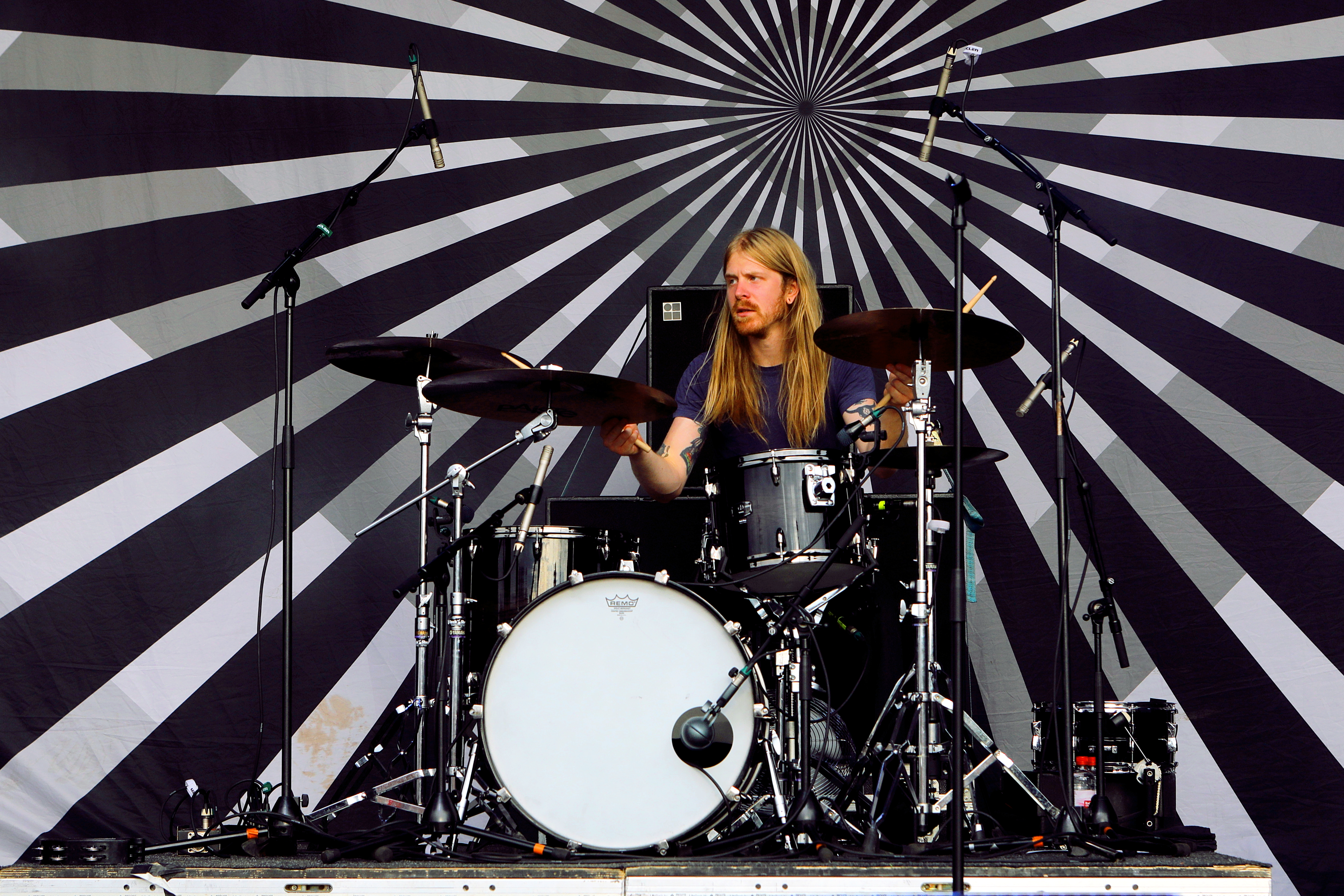
André Kvarnström

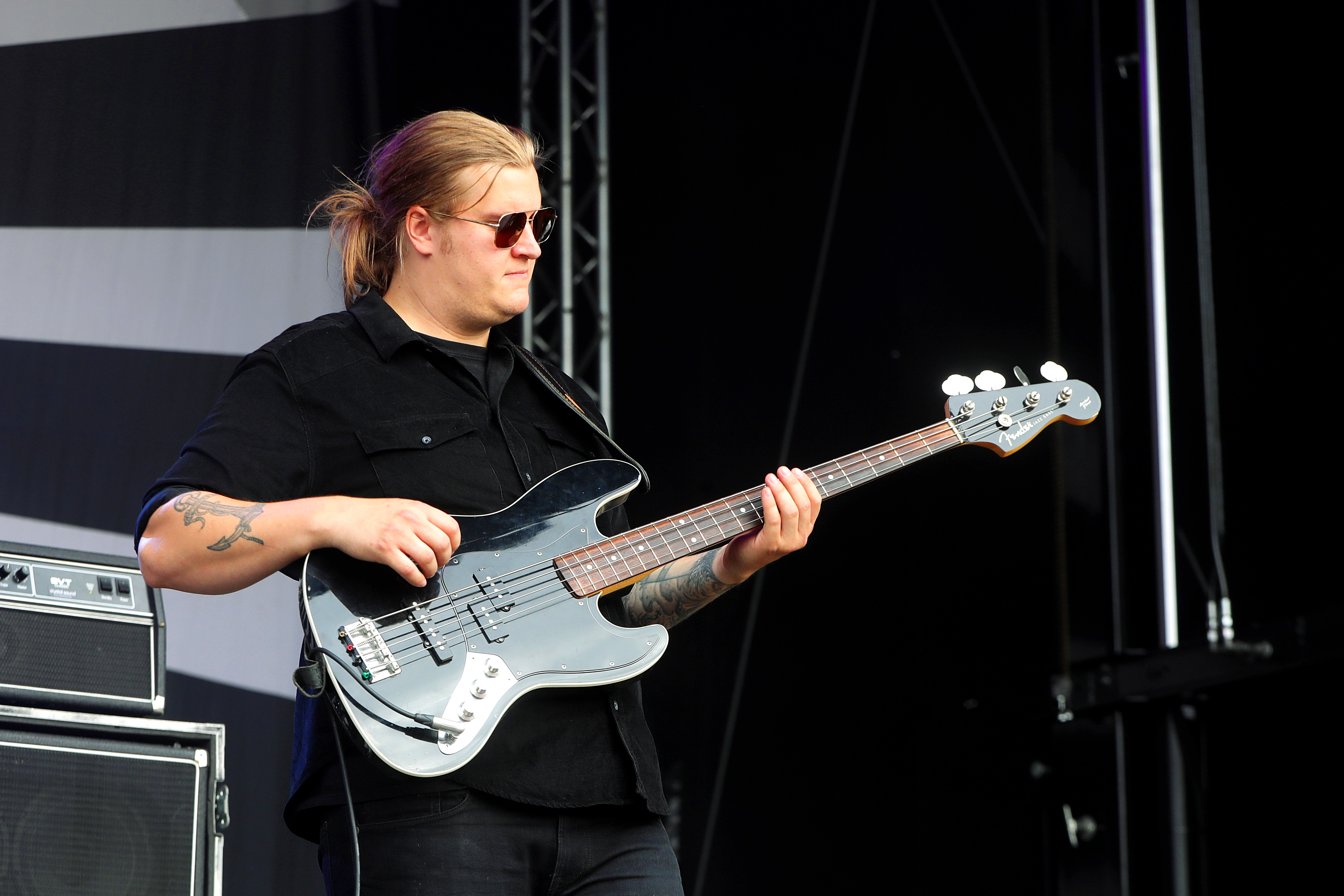
Kristoffer Schander

== Discography ==
Albums

Date	Album	SWE	GER	SWI	AUT	FIN	UK	BEL	FRA
2014	Blues Pills		4	10	19	21	68	72	118
2015	Blues Pills - Live							148	
2016	Lady in Gold	27	1	2	12	6	31	27	55
2017	Lady in Gold - Live in Paris								
2020	Holy Moly!		4	11	6	24	89	69	148
2024	Birthday		12	14	24				

EPs

- Bliss (25 May 2012)
- Devil Man (18 October 2013)
- Live at Rockpalast (28 March 2014)

Singles

- Black Smoke (3 July 2012)
- High Class Woman (2014)
- Lady in Gold (2016)
- Proud Woman (2020)
- Low Road (2020)
- Birthday (2024)

Compilations

- Golden Treasures (August 2016) (insert in the German RockHard magazine Vol. 351)
