= Tony Joe White =

American singer-songwriter and musician (1943–2018)

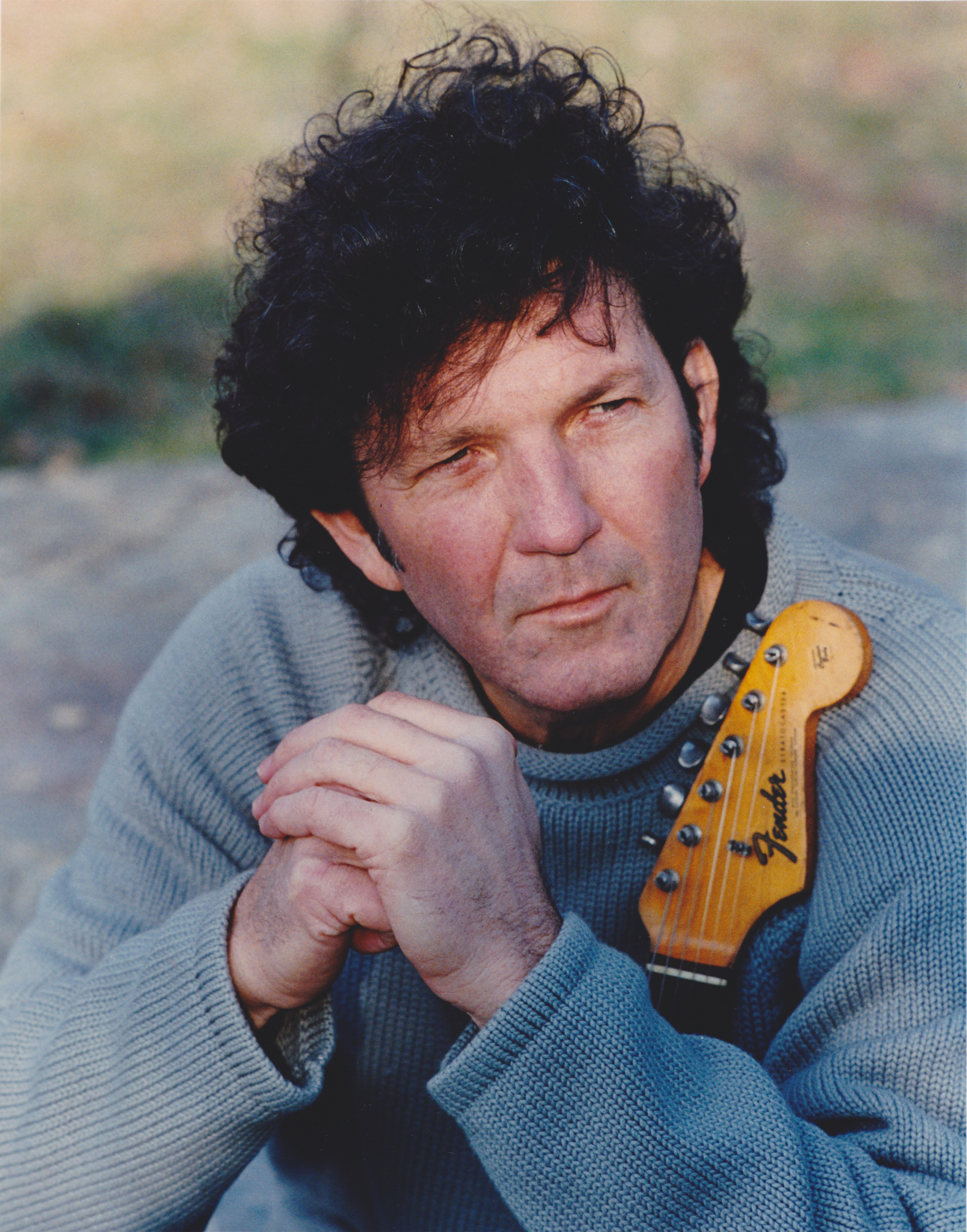

Background information
- Also known as: Swamp Fox
- Born: July 23, 1943; Goodwill, Louisiana, U.S.
- Died: October 24, 2018 (aged 75) Leiper's Fork, Tennessee, U.S.
- Genres: Swamp rock
- Occupations: Musician; songwriter
- Instruments: Guitar; vocals; harmonica
- Years active: 1967–2018
- Labels: Monument; Warner Bros.; Polydor; Yep Roc; Easy Eye Sound
- Website: tonyjoewhite.com

Tony Joe White (July 23, 1943 – October 24, 2018), nicknamed the Swamp Fox, was an American singer-songwriter and guitarist, best known for his 1969 hit "Polk Salad Annie" and for "Rainy Night in Georgia", which he wrote but which was first made popular by Brook Benton in 1970. He also wrote "Steamy Windows" and "Undercover Agent for the Blues", both hits for Tina Turner in 1989; those two songs came by way of Turner's producer at the time, Mark Knopfler, who was a friend of White. "Polk Salad Annie" was also recorded by Joe Dassin, Elvis Presley, Joe Bonamassa and Tom Jones.

== Biography ==
White was born and raised on a cotton farm in Goodwill, Louisiana, an unincorporated community of West Carroll Parish, approximately ten miles southwest of Oak Grove. As a youth, he was enthralled by the music of Lightnin' Hopkins, and began his career as a member of Tony & the Mojos before moving to Texas to start Tony & the Twilights. He was inspired to begin writing songs after hearing Bobbie Gentry's 1967 hit "Ode to Billie Joe."

=== 1960s–1970s ===
In 1967, White signed with Monument Records, which operated from a recording studio in the Nashville suburb of Hendersonville, Tennessee, and produced a variety of sounds, including rock and roll, country and western, and rhythm and blues. Billy Swan was his producer on his first three albums.

Over the next three years, White released four singles with no commercial success in the U.S., although "Soul Francisco" was a hit in France. "Polk Salad Annie" had been released for nine months and written off as a failure by his record label when it finally entered the U.S. charts in July 1969. It climbed to the Top Ten by early August and eventually reached No. 8, becoming White's biggest hit.

White's first album, 1969's Black and White, was recorded with Muscle Shoals/Nashville musicians David Briggs, Norbert Putnam, and Jerry Carrigan, and featured "Willie and Laura Mae Jones" and "Polk Salad Annie", along with Jimmy Webb's "Wichita Lineman". "Willie and Laura Mae Jones" was covered by Dusty Springfield and released as a single, later added to reissues of her 1969 album Dusty in Memphis.

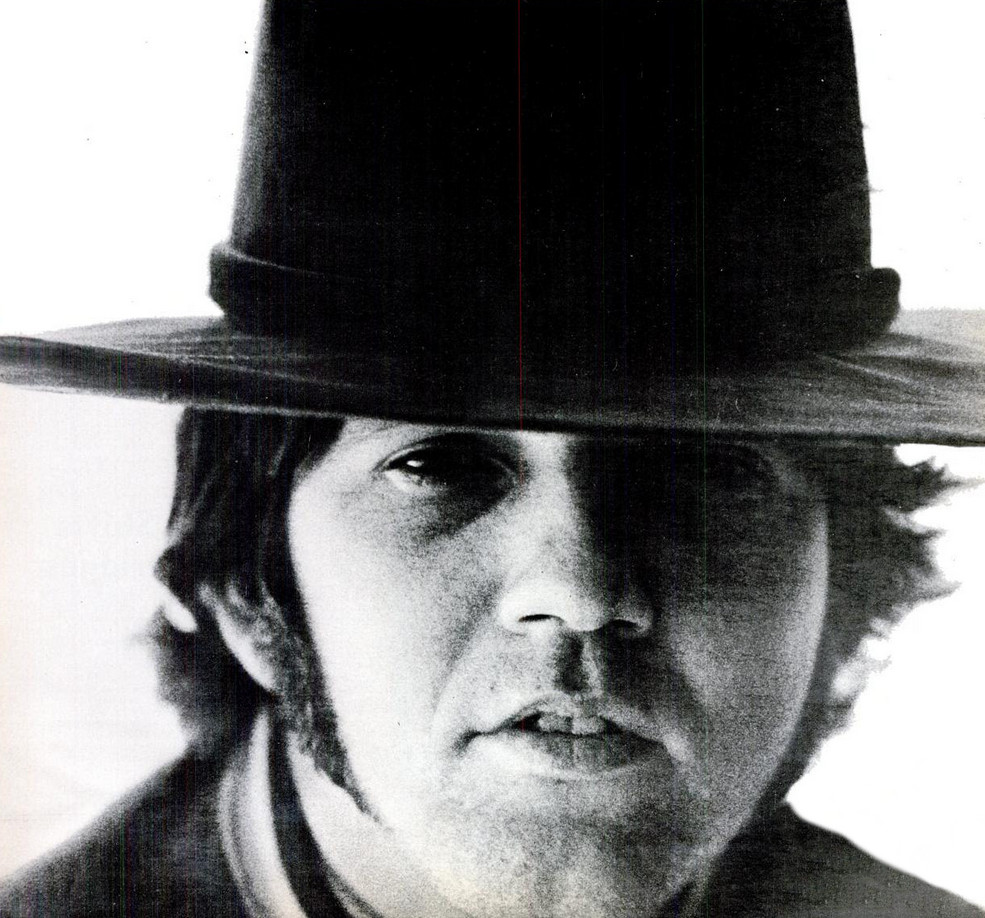
Tony Joe White c. 1970

Three more singles quickly followed, all minor hits, and White toured with Steppenwolf, Anne Murray, Sly & the Family Stone, Creedence Clearwater Revival, The Carpenters and other major rock acts of the 1970s, playing in France, Germany, Belgium, Sweden and England.

In 1973, White appeared in the film Catch My Soul, a rock-opera adaption of Shakespeare's Othello. White played and sang four songs and composed seven for the musical.

In late September 1973, White was recruited by record producer Huey Meaux to sit in on the Memphis sessions that became Jerry Lee Lewis's Southern Roots: Back Home to Memphis album. These sessions were a three-day, around-the-clock party, which not only reunited the original MGs (Steve Cropper, Donald "Duck" Dunn and Al Jackson, Jr. of Booker T. and the MGs fame) for the first time in three years, but also featured Carl Perkins, Mark Lindsay (of Paul Revere & the Raiders), and Wayne Jackson plus The Memphis Horns.

=== 1980s ===
From 1976 to 1983, White released three more albums, all on different labels. Trying to combine his own swamp-rock sound with the popular disco music at the time, the results were not successful and White gave up his career as a singer and concentrated on writing songs. During this time frame, he collaborated with American expat Joe Dassin on his only English-language album, Home Made Ice Cream, and its French-language counterpart, Blue Country.

=== 1990s comeback ===
In 1989, White produced one non-single track on Tina Turner's Foreign Affair album, the rest of the album being produced by Dan Hartman. Playing a variety of instruments on the album, he also wrote four songs, including the title song and the hit single "Steamy Windows". As a result of this he became managed by Roger Davies, who was Turner's manager at the time, and he obtained a new contract with Polydor.

The resulting album, 1991's Closer to the Truth, was a commercial success and put White back in the spotlight. He released two more albums for Polydor: The Path of a Decent Groove and Lake Placid Blues, which was co-produced by Roger Davies.

In the 1990s, White toured Germany and France with Joe Cocker and Eric Clapton, and in 1992 he played the Montreux Festival. During the late 1990s, White also toured with Waylon Jennings.

In 1996, Tina Turner released the song "On Silent Wings" written by White.

=== 2000s ===
In 2000, Hip-O Records released One Hot July in the U.S., giving White his first new major-label domestic release in 17 years. The critically acclaimed The Beginning appeared on Swamp Records in 2001, followed by The Heroines, featuring several duets with female vocalists including Jessi Colter, Shelby Lynne, Emmylou Harris, Lucinda Williams, and Michelle White, on Sanctuary in 2004, and a live Austin City Limits concert, Live from Austin, TX, on New West Records in 2006. In 2004, White was the featured guest artist in an episode of the Legends Rock TV Show and Concert Series, produced by Megabien Entertainment.

In 2007, White released another live recording, Take Home the Swamp, as well as the compilation Introduction to Tony Joe White. Elkie Brooks recorded one of White's songs, "Out of The Rain", on her 2005 Electric Lady album. On July 14, 2006, in Magny-Cours, France, White performed as a warm-up act for Roger Waters' The Dark Side of the Moon concert. White's album, entitled Uncovered, was released in September 2006 and featured collaborations with Mark Knopfler, Michael McDonald, Eric Clapton, and J.J. Cale.

The song "Elements and Things" from the 1969 album ...Continued features prominently during the horse-racing scenes in the 2012 HBO television series "Luck".

In 2013, White signed to Yep Roc Records and released Hoodoo. Mother Jones called the album "Steamy, Irresistible" and No Depression noted Tony Joe White is "the real king of the swamp". He also made his Live...with Jools Holland debut in London, playing songs from Hoodoo.

On October 15, 2014, White appeared on The Late Show with David Letterman alongside the Foo Fighters to perform "Polk Salad Annie". Pointing to White, Letterman told his TV audience, "Holy cow! ... If I was this guy, you could all kiss my ass. And I mean that."

In May 2016, Tony Joe White released Rain Crow on Yep Roc Records. The lead track "Hoochie Woman" was co-written with his wife, Leann. The track "Conjure Child" is a follow-up to an earlier song, "Conjure Woman".

The album Bad Mouthin' was released in September 2018 again on Yep Roc Records. The album contains six self-penned songs and five blues standards written by, amongst others, Charley Patton and John Lee Hooker. On the album White also performs a cover of the Elvis Presley song "Heartbreak Hotel". White plays acoustic and electric guitar on the album which was produced by his son Jody White and it has that signature Tony Joe White laidback sound.

The posthumous album Smoke From the Chimney was released May 7, 2021, on Easy Eye Sound. The album features nine vocal and guitar demo recordings of White, fully realized and arranged by producer Dan Auerbach. The tracks feature many top Nashville session players, including drummer Gene Chrisman, keyboardist Bobby Wood, bassist Dave Roe, guitarist Marcus King, and others.

=== Death ===
White died of a heart attack on October 24, 2018 at his home in Leiper's Fork, Tennessee, at the age of 75. "He wasn't ill at all. He just had a heart attack... there was no pain or suffering", said his son, Jody White.

== Discography ==
- 1969 – Black and White (Monument Records 18114)
- 1969 – ...Continued (Monument Records 18133)
- 1970 – Tony Joe (Monument Records 18142)
- 1971 – The Best of Tony Joe White (Monument [Germany] Records 10000) – compilation of the three Monument albums. (No U.S. release)
- 1971 – Tony Joe White (Warner Bros. Records 1900)
- 1972 – The Train I'm On (Warner Bros. Records 2580)
- 1973 – Homemade Ice Cream (Warner Bros. Records 2708)
- 1973 – Catch My Soul – original soundtrack (Metromedia Records/RCA BML1-0176)
- 1975 – Best of Tony Joe White (Warner Bros. [UK] Records 56149) – compilation of the three Warner Bros. albums.
- 1976 – Eyes (20th Century Records T-523)
- 1980 – The Real Thang (Casablanca Records NB-7233)
- 1983 – Dangerous (Columbia Records FC-38817)
- 1986 – Live In Europe 1971 (Swamp Records SR-0071) – live recording from 1971.
- 1986 – Tony Joe White Live! (Dixie Frog [France] Records DFG-8407) – reissue
- 1991 – Closer to the Truth (Remark Records/Polydor 511 386-2; also on Swamp Records 723-2)
- 1993 – The Path of a Decent Groove (Remark Records/Polydor 519 938-2)
- 1993 – The Best of Tony Joe White (Featuring Polk Salad Annie) (Warner Bros. Records 45305) – CD compilation
- 1995 – Lake Placid Blues (Remark Records/Polydor 527 530-2)
- 1997 – Collection (Festival [Australia] Records D-31737) – compilation
- 1998 – One Hot July (Tupelo-Mercury [UK] Records 558 894-2; reissued on Hip-O Records/Mercury/UMe 562 720-2)
- 2000 – Greatest Hits and More (Polydor [Netherlands] Records 541 396-2) – 2-CD compilation
- 2000 – Tony Joe White In Concert (Brilliant [UK] Records BT-33053) – live recording from 1969/1970. NOTE: this material has also been issued as 'Roosevelt And Ira Lee' on Astan [Germany] Records (20095); as 'Hard To Handle' on Fruit Tree [Italy] Records (FT-836); as 'Polk Salad Annie Live' on The Wonderful Music Of [Netherlands] Records (90382); and as 'Night Of The Moccasin' (250022), and 'Take Home The Swamp' (250096) on Music Avenue [Belgium] Records.
- 2001 – The Beginning (Swamp Records 8226 855520 21; reissued on Audium Records/Koch 8139)
- 2002 – Snakey (Swamp Records 7588 7707242 1; also on Munich [Netherlands] Records MRCD-241)
- 2003 – Dangerous Eyes (Raven [Australia] Records RVCD-159) – CD reissue/compilation of 1976's Eyes and 1983's Dangerous.
- 2004 – The Heroines (Sanctuary Records 06076 86366 20)
- 2006 – Live From Austin TX (New West Records NW-6092) – a live recording from 1980.
- 2006 – Uncovered (Swamp Records 7588 7707243 8; also on Munich [Netherlands] Records MRCD-279)
- 2006 – Swamp Music: The Complete Monument Recordings (Rhino Handmade Records RHM2-7731) – limited edition 4-CD box set compilation
- 2008 – Live at the Basement (ZYX/Pepper Records PEC-2039-2) – a live recording from 2002.
- 2008 – Deep Cuts (Swamp Records 7588 7708343 4; also on Munich [Netherlands] Records MRCD-295)
- 2010 – The Shine (Swamp Records 8226 857220 28; also on Munich [Netherlands] Records MRCD-323)
- 2010 – Live in Amsterdam (Munich [Netherlands] Records MRCD-325) – CD+DVD combo
- 2010 – That On the Road Look 'Live' (Rhino Handmade Records RHM2 542696) – another reissue of the Dixie Frog album.
- 2011 – Tony Joe White Collection (Cargo [Germany] Records 8712 1770583 10) – 3-CD compilation
- 2012 – Collected (Universal [Poland] Music 6007 533767 06) – 3-CD compilation
- 2013 – Hoodoo (Yep Roc Records 2348)
- 2015 – The Complete Warner Bros. Recordings (Real Gone Music 8480 640032 98) – 2-CD compilation
- 2015 – Swamp Fox: The Definitive Collection 1968–1973 (Salvo/Union Square [UK] Music 6984 588225 29) – 2-CD compilation
- 2016 – Rain Crow (Yep Roc Records 2450)
- 2018 – Bad Mouthin' (Yep Roc Records 2593)
- 2021 – Smoke From the Chimney (Easy Eye Sound EES-016)
