= Closer to the Truth (Tony Joe White album) =

Studio album by Tony Joe White
- Released: 1991
- Studio: Muscle Shoals Sound Studio, Alabama
- Length: 58:03
- Label: Swamp Records (US); Festival (Aus/N.Z.)
- Producer: Tony Joe White

Tony Joe White chronology
Dangerous (1983)	Closer to the Truth (1991)	The Path of a Decent Grove (1993)

Professional ratings
Review scores
Source	Rating
The Encyclopedia of Popular Music	3/5 stars

Closer to the Truth is a 1991 album by American singer-songwriter Tony Joe White. The album marked White's return to recording, after years working solely as a songwriter. The songs "Steamy Windows" and "Undercover Agent for the Blues" were originally written for Tina Turner, and were previously recorded by her for her album Foreign Affair, featuring White on guitar.

The album sold more than 250,000 copies in Europe and Australia.

== Critical reception ==
The Courier-Mail wrote that the album "has several stand-out tracks including 'Tunica Motel,' 'The Other Side,' 'Cool Town Woman' and 'Bare Necessities.'"

== Track listing ==
All songs by Tony Joe White except as indicated.

1. "Tunica Motel" – 4:17
2. "Ain't Going Down This Time" – 5:06
3. "Steamy Windows" – 3:54
4. "(You're Gonna Look) Good in Blues" – 5:10
5. "Love M.D." (Leann White, Tony Joe White) – 3:34
6. "The Other Side" – 5:50
7. "Bi-Yo Rhythm" – 5:15
8. "Cool Town Woman" – 4:16
9. "Bare Necessities" – 3:47
10. "Undercover Agent for the Blues" (Leann White, Tony Joe White) – 4:44
11. "Main Squeeze" – 4:16
12. "Closer to the Truth" (Leann White, Tony Joe White) – 6:33

== Personnel ==
=== Band members ===
- Tony Joe White – guitars, harmonica, whomper, swamp box
- David Hood – bass guitar
- Roger Hawkins – drums
- Steve Nathan – keyboards
- Spooner Oldham – Wurlitzer piano
- Harvey Thompson – horns
- Mickey Buckins – percussion

=== Production ===
- Chris Lord-Alge – mixing
- Steve Melton – engineering
- Leann White – photography
- Glenn Sakamoto – package design

== Charts ==
Chart performance for Closer to the Truth
Chart (1991–1992)	Peak position
Australian Albums (ARIA)	76
Dutch Albums (Album Top 100)	26
New Zealand Albums (RMNZ)	8
Swedish Albums (Sverigetopplistan)	25
