= 1973 =

1973 in various calendars
- Gregorian calendar: 1973; MCMLXXIII
- Ab urbe condita: 2726
- Armenian calendar: 1422; ԹՎ ՌՆԻԲ
- Assyrian calendar: 6723
- Baháʼí calendar: 129–130
- Balinese saka calendar: 1894–1895
- Bengali calendar: 1379–1380
- Berber calendar: 2923
- British Regnal year: 21 Eliz. 2 – 22 Eliz. 2
- Buddhist calendar: 2517
- Burmese calendar: 1335
- Byzantine calendar: 7481–7482
- Chinese calendar: 壬子年 (Water Rat); 4670 or 4463 — to — 癸丑年 (Water Ox); 4671 or 4464
- Coptic calendar: 1689–1690
- Discordian calendar: 3139
- Ethiopian calendar: 1965–1966
- Hebrew calendar: 5733–5734
- Hindu calendars
- Vikram Samvat: 2029–2030
- Shaka Samvat: 1894–1895
- Kali Yuga: 5073–5074
- Holocene calendar: 11973
- Igbo calendar: 973–974
- Iranian calendar: 1351–1352
- Islamic calendar: 1392–1393
- Japanese calendar: Shōwa 48 (昭和４８年)
- Javanese calendar: 1904–1905
- Juche calendar: 62
- Julian calendar: Gregorian minus 13 days
- Korean calendar: 4306
- Minguo calendar: ROC 62 民國62年
- Nanakshahi calendar: 505
- Thai solar calendar: 2516
- Tibetan calendar: ཆུ་ཕོ་བྱི་བ་ལོ་ (male Water-Rat); 2099 or 1718 or 946 — to — ཆུ་མོ་གླང་ལོ་ (female Water-Ox); 2100 or 1719 or 947
- Unix time: 94694400 – 126230399

1973 (MCMLXXIII) was a common year starting on Monday of the Gregorian calendar, the 1973rd year of the Common Era (CE) and Anno Domini (AD) designations, the 973rd year of the 2nd millennium, the 73rd year of the 20th century, and the 4th year of the 1970s decade.

== Events ==
=== January ===
- January 1 – The United Kingdom, the Republic of Ireland, and Denmark enter the European Economic Community, which later becomes the European Union.
- January 15 – Vietnam War: Citing progress in peace negotiations, U.S. President Richard Nixon announces the suspension of offensive action in North Vietnam.
- January 17 – Ferdinand Marcos becomes President for Life of the Philippines.
- January 22
  - The Sunshine Showdown: George Foreman defeats Joe Frazier to win the heavyweight world boxing championship in Kingston, Jamaica.
  - A Royal Jordanian Boeing 707 flight from Jeddah crashes in Kano, Nigeria; 176 people are killed.
- January 27 – U.S. involvement in the Vietnam War ends with the signing of the Paris Peace Accords.

=== February ===
- February 8 – A military insurrection in Uruguay poses an institutional challenge to President Juan María Bordaberry.
- February 21 – Libyan Arab Airlines Flight 114, Boeing 727, is shot down by Israeli fighter aircraft over the Sinai Desert which was under Israeli occupation at the time, after the passenger plane is suspected of being an enemy military plane. There are 108 fatalities, and only five people on board survive (one crew member and four passengers).
- February 28 – The Republic of Ireland general election is held. Liam Cosgrave becomes the new Taoiseach.

=== March ===
- March 8 – The Troubles: A referendum is held in Northern Ireland over whether to reunite with the Republic of Ireland or to stay a part of the UK. The result was 98% remain. The Provisional Irish Republican Army responds to the referendum by planting four car bombs in London on the same day, two of which went off, causing one death and injuring over 200 people.
- March 10 – Sir Richard Sharples, Governor of Bermuda, is assassinated outside Government House, along with his aide-de-camp.
- March 18 – Comet Kohoutek is discovered.
- March 21 – The Lofthouse Colliery disaster occurs in Great Britain. Seven miners are trapped underground; none survive.
- March 27 – At the 45th Academy Awards, The Godfather wins best picture.

=== April ===
- April 1
  - India launches the wildlife conservation program Project Tiger.
  - Value Added Tax (VAT) is introduced in the United Kingdom.
- April 3 – The first handheld mobile phone call is made by Martin Cooper of Motorola in New York City.
- April 4 — The original World Trade Center is officially dedicated.
- April 5
  - Fahri Korutürk becomes the sixth president of Turkey.
  - Pioneer 11 is launched on a mission to study the Solar System.
- April 10
  - Operation Spring of Youth: Israeli commandos raid Beirut, assassinating 3 leaders of the Palestinian Resistance Movement. The Lebanese army's inaction brings the immediate resignation of Prime Minister Saeb Salam, a Sunni Muslim.
  - The Islamic Republic of Pakistan introduces its new constitution.
- April 15 – Naim Talu, a former civil servant, forms the new government of Turkey (36th government).
- April 17 – The West German counter-terrorist force GSG 9 is officially formed in response to the Munich massacre.

=== May ===
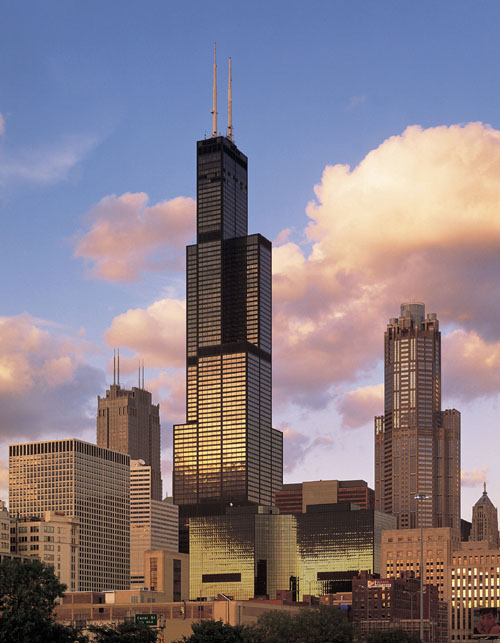
Sears Tower

- May 3 – The Sears Tower in Chicago, United States, is topped-out, becoming the world's tallest building at 1,451 feet (442 m).
- May 5 – Shambu Tamang becomes the youngest person to climb to the summit of Mount Everest.
- May 10 – The Polisario Front, a Sahrawi movement dedicated to the independence of Spanish Sahara, is formed.
- May 11 – The Data Act (Sw. Datalagen) − the world's first national data protection law − is enacted in Sweden.
- May 14 – Skylab, the United States' first space station, is launched.
- May 18 – Second Cod War: Joseph Godber, British Minister of Agriculture, Fisheries and Food, announces that Royal Navy frigates will protect British trawlers fishing in the disputed 80 km (50 mi) limit around Iceland.
- May 25
  - Skylab 2 (Pete Conrad, Paul Weitz, Joseph Kerwin) is launched on a mission to repair damage to the recently launched Skylab space station.
  - Héctor José Cámpora becomes democratic president of the Argentine Republic ending the 1966 to 1973 Revolución Argentina military dictatorship.

=== June ===
- June 1 – The Greek military junta abolishes the monarchy and proclaims a republic.
- June 3 – A Tupolev Tu-144 crashes at the Paris air show; 15 are killed.
- June 10 – Henri Pescarolo and co-driver Gérard Larrousse (both France) win the 24 Hours of Le Mans in the Equipe Matra MS670B.
- June 20 – The Ezeiza massacre occurs in Buenos Aires, Argentina. Snipers shoot at left-wing Peronists, killing at least 13 and injuring more than 300.
- June 24
  - Leonid Brezhnev addresses the American people on television, the first Soviet leader to do so.
  - UpStairs Lounge arson attack, an as-yet unsolved attack on a gay bar in New Orleans, Louisiana, in which 32 patrons are killed.
- June 25 – Erskine Hamilton Childers is elected the 4th President of Ireland.
- June 26 – At Plesetsk Cosmodrome, nine people are killed in the explosion of a Cosmos 3-M rocket.
- June 27 – Coup d'état in Uruguay: pressed by the military, President Juan María Bordaberry dissolves Parliament; a 12-year-long civic-military dictatorship begins.
- June 28 – Elections are held for the Northern Ireland Assembly, which will lead to power-sharing between unionists and nationalists in Northern Ireland for the first time.
- June 30 – A very long total solar eclipse occurs. During the entire second millennium, only seven total solar eclipses exceeded seven minutes of totality.

=== July ===
- July 3 – Conference on Security and Cooperation in Europe (CSCE).
- July 5 – A catastrophic BLEVE (Boiling Liquid Expanding Vapor Explosion) occurs in Kingman, Arizona, United States, following a fire that broke out as propane was being transferred from a railroad car to a storage tank, killing 11 firefighters.
- July 10 – The Bahamas gains full independence within the Commonwealth of Nations.
- July 11 – Varig Flight 820 crashes near Orly, France; 123 people are killed.
- July 16 – Watergate scandal: Former White House aide Alexander Butterfield informs the United States Senate Watergate Committee that President Richard Nixon had secretly recorded potentially incriminating conversations.
- July 17 – King Mohammed Zahir Shah of Afghanistan is deposed by his cousin Mohammed Daoud Khan while in Italy undergoing eye surgery.
- July 20 – France resumes nuclear bomb tests in Mururoa Atoll, over the protests of Australia and New Zealand.
- July 21 – Lillehammer affair: Agents of Mossad, the Israeli secret intelligence agency, shoot and kill a Moroccan waiter in Lillehammer, Norway, mistakenly believing him to be a senior member of the Palestinian Black September Organization.
- July 23 – The Avianca Building in Bogotá, Colombia, suffers a serious fire, in which four people are killed.
- July 25 – The Soviet Mars 5 space probe is launched.
- July 28 – Skylab 3 (Owen Garriott, Jack Lousma, Alan Bean) is launched, to conduct various medical and scientific experiments aboard Skylab.
- July 31 – A Delta Air Lines DC-9 aircraft flying as Delta Air Lines Flight 723 lands short of Logan Airport runway at Boston, United States, in poor visibility, striking a sea wall about 165 feet (50 m) to the right of the runway centerline and about 3000 feet (914 m) short. All 6 crew members and 83 passengers are killed; one of the passengers died several months after the accident.

=== August ===
Flag of CARICOM

- August 1 – Caribbean Community and Common Market (CARICOM) is inaugurated.
- August 2 – A flash fire kills 51 at the Summerland amusement centre at Douglas, Isle of Man.
- August 5
  - Black September members open fire at the Athens airport; 3 people are killed, 55 injured.
  - Mars 6, also known as 3MP No. 50P, is launched by the Soviet Union to explore Mars.
- August 8 – South Korean politician Kim Dae-jung is kidnapped in Tokyo by the KCIA.
- August 15 – The U.S. bombing of Cambodia ends, officially halting 12 years of combat activity in Southeast Asia according to the Case–Church Amendment-an act that prohibits military operations in Laos, Cambodia, and North and South Vietnam as a follow-up of the Paris Peace Accords.
- August 23 – The Norrmalmstorg robbery occurs, famous for the origin of the term Stockholm syndrome.
- August 25 – Disappearance of Joanne Ratcliffe and Kirste Gordon: Two Australian girls go missing whilst attending an Australian rules football match at the Adelaide Oval, never to be seen again.
- August 30 – Apostle Arsenio T. Ferriol registers the Pentecostal Missionary Church of Christ (4th Watch) with the Philippine government.

=== September ===
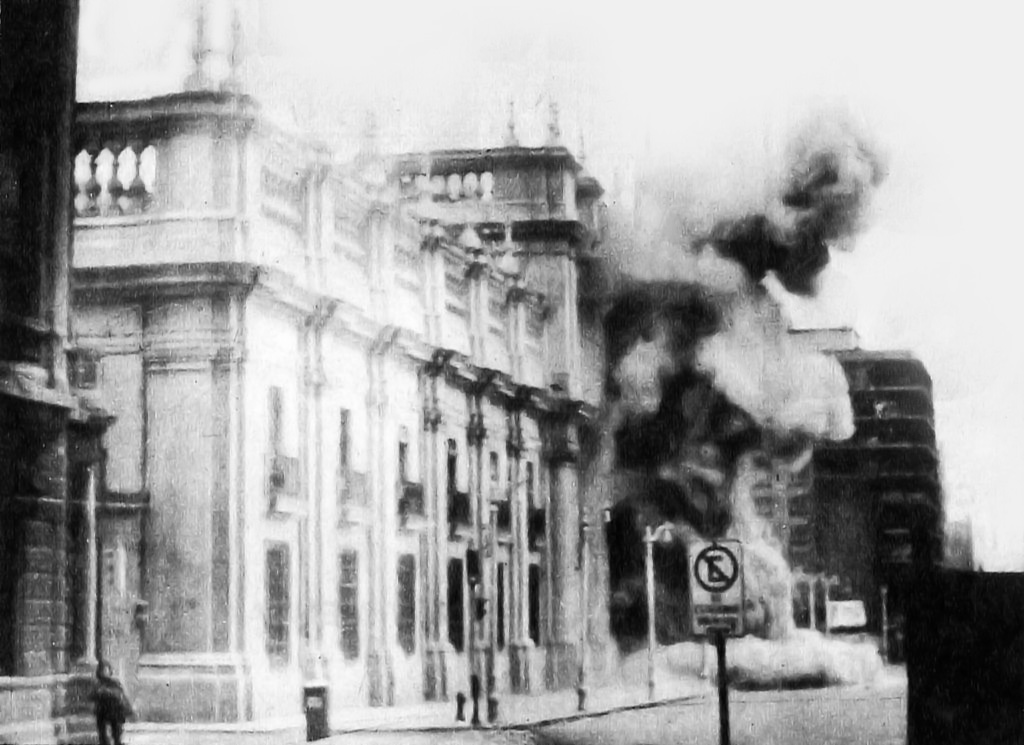
La Moneda Palace being bombed amidst heavy fighting between government forces and the Chilean Military who was staging a coup, on September 11th.

- September 9 – Scottish racing driver Jackie Stewart becomes World Drivers' Champion when his Tyrrell 003-Cosworth finishes fourth in the 1973 Italian Grand Prix at Monza.
- September 11 – Chile's democratically elected government is overthrown in a violent military coup after serious political instability. President Salvador Allende allegedly commits suicide during the coup in the presidential palace and General Augusto Pinochet heads a US-backed military junta that governs Chile for the next 17 years.
- September 15 – Carl XVI Gustaf, becomes King of Sweden following the death of his grandfather, King Gustaf VI Adolf.
- September 18 – The two German Republics, the Federal Republic of Germany (West Germany) and the German Democratic Republic (East Germany), are admitted to the United Nations.
- September 20
  - Billie Jean King beats Bobby Riggs in a singles tennis match billed as the "Battle of the Sexes".
  - Jim Croce, Maury Muehleisen and four others are killed in a plane crash shortly after takeoff following a concert at Northwestern Louisiana University in Natchitoches.
- September 27
  - Soviet space program: Soyuz 12 (Vasily Lazarev, Oleg Makarov), the first Soviet crewed flight since the Soyuz 11 tragedy in 1971, is launched.
  - Luís Cabral declares the independence of the Republic of Guinea-Bissau from the Estado Novo regime in Portugal. It is later granted in September 1974.

=== October ===
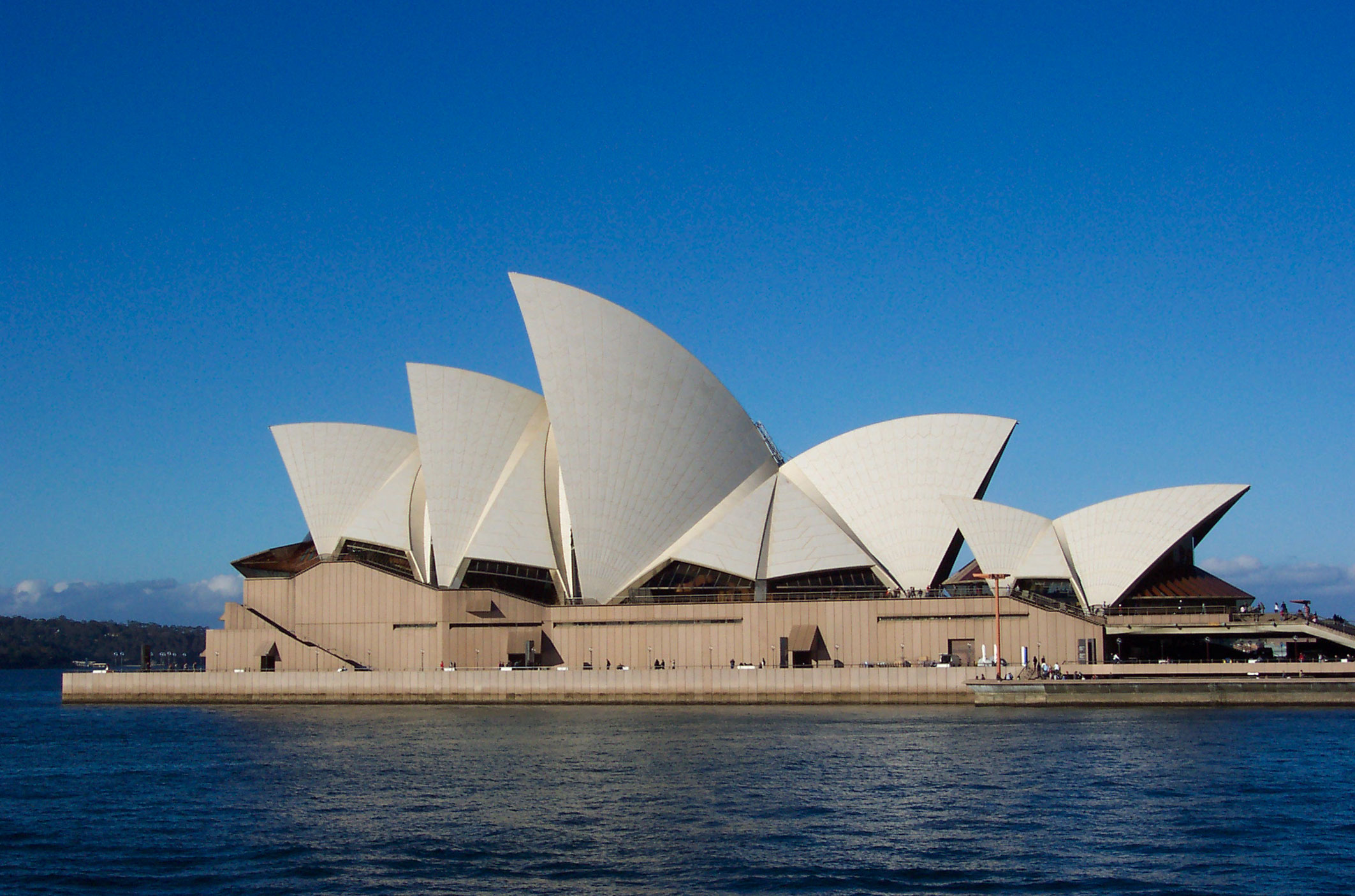
October 20: Sydney Opera House is opened by Elizabeth II

- October 6 – Yom Kippur War begins: The fourth and largest Arab–Israeli conflict begins, as Egyptian and Syrian forces attack Israeli forces in the Sinai Peninsula and Golan Heights on Yom Kippur.
- October 14 – Thai popular uprising: Students revolt in Bangkok – In the Thammasat student uprising over 100,000 people protest in Thailand against the Thanom military government, 77 are killed and 857 are injured by soldiers.
- October 15 – Typhoon Ruth crosses Luzon, Philippines, killing 27 people and causing $5 million in damage.
- October 17 – An OPEC oil embargo against several countries supporting Israel triggers the 1973 energy crisis.
- October 20
  - The Saturday Night Massacre: U.S. President Richard Nixon orders Attorney General Elliot Richardson to dismiss Watergate Special Prosecutor Archibald Cox. Richardson refuses and resigns, along with Deputy Attorney General William Ruckelshaus. Solicitor General Robert Bork, third in line at the Department of Justice, then fires Cox. The event prompts calls for Nixon's impeachment.
  - The Sydney Opera House in Australia is opened by Queen Elizabeth II after 14 years of construction work.

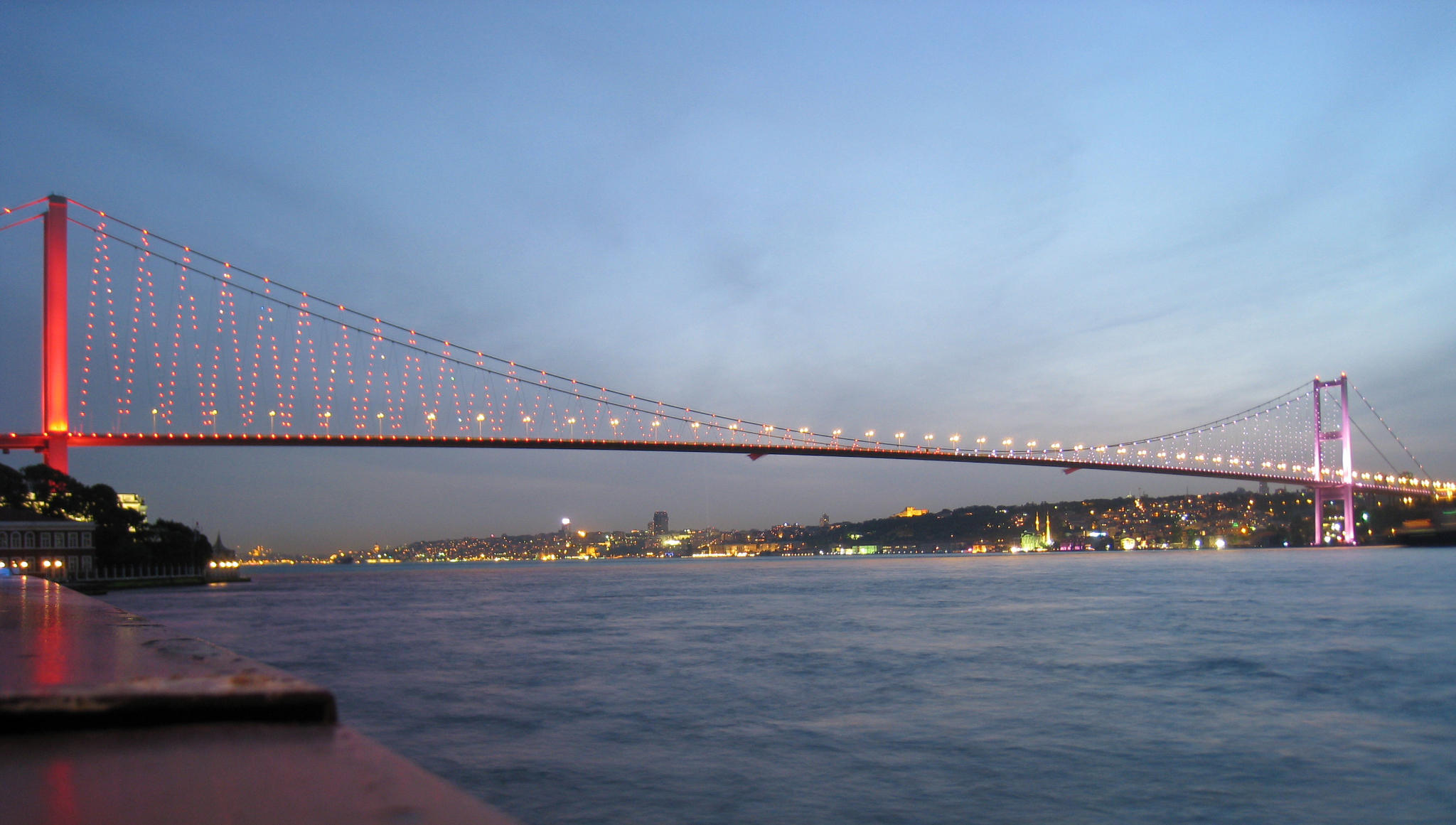
October 30: The Bosphorus Bridge is opened by Turkish President Fahri Korutürk

- October 25 – The Yom Kippur War ends.
- October 26 – The United Nations recognizes the independence of Guinea-Bissau.
- October 30 – The Bosphorus Bridge in Istanbul, Turkey, is completed, connecting the continents of Europe and Asia over the Bosphorus Strait for the first time in history.

=== November ===
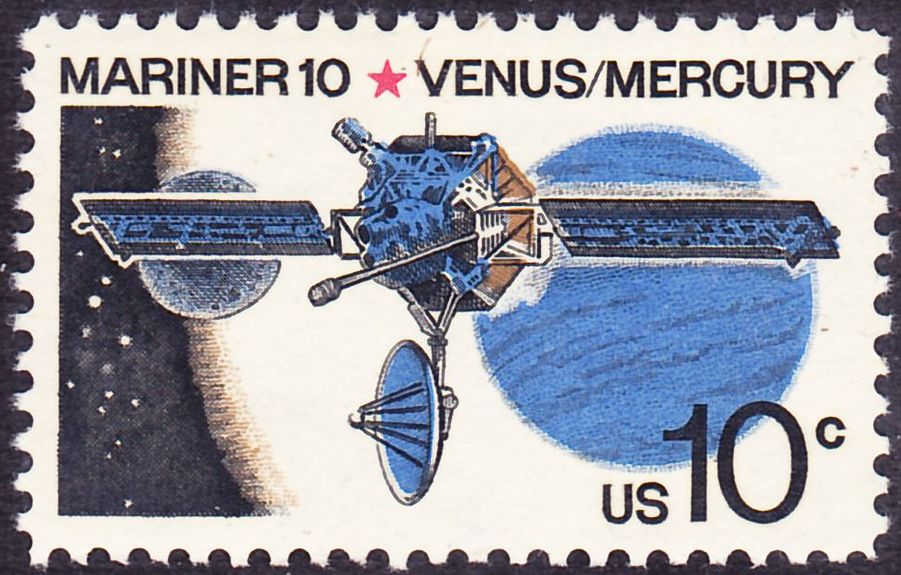
Mariner 10 space probe, on U.S. Stamps, Space Exploration History, Issue of 1975

- November 3
  - Pan Am flight 160, a Boeing 707-321C, crashes at Logan International Airport, Boston, killing three people.
  - Mariner program: NASA launches Mariner 10 toward Mercury (on March 29, 1974, it becomes the first space probe to reach that planet).
- November 7 – The Congress of the United States overrides President Richard Nixon's veto of the War Powers Resolution, which limits presidential power to wage war without congressional approval.
- November 16
  - Skylab program: NASA launches Skylab 4 (Gerald Carr, William Pogue, Edward Gibson) from Cape Canaveral, Florida, on an 84-day mission.
  - U.S. President Richard Nixon signs the Trans-Alaska Pipeline Authorization Act into law, authorizing the construction of the Alaska Pipeline.
- November 17 – The Athens Polytechnic uprising occurs against the military regime in Athens, Greece.
- November 25 – Greek dictator Georgios Papadopoulos is ousted in a military coup led by Brigadier General Dimitrios Ioannidis.
- November 27 – The United States Senate votes 92–3 to confirm Gerald Ford as Vice President of the United States.
- November 29 – 104 people are killed in a Taiyo department store fire in Kumamoto, Kyūshū, Japan.
- November – Queen Sisowath Kossamak of Cambodia is released from house arrest to Beijing.

=== December ===
- December – Chile breaks diplomatic contacts with Sweden.
- December 1 – Papua New Guinea gains self-government from Australia.
- December 3 – Pioneer program: Pioneer 10 sends back the first close-up images of Jupiter.
- December 6 – The United States House of Representatives votes 387–35 to confirm Gerald Ford as Vice President of the United States; he is sworn in the same day.
- December 14 – Rhodesia executes two Blacks at Salisbury Central Prison for murder.
- December 18
  - Soviet space program: Soyuz 13 (Pyotr Klimuk, Valentin Lebedev) is launched.
  - The Islamic Development Bank is created as a specialized agency of the Organisation of the Islamic Conference (OIC) (effective August 12, 1974).
- December 20 – Spanish prime minister Luis Carrero Blanco is assassinated in Madrid by the separatist organization ETA.
- December 28 – The Endangered Species Act is passed in the United States.
- December 30 – Terrorist Carlos fails in his attempt to assassinate British businessman Joseph Sieff.

=== Date unknown ===
- A large Song dynasty trade ship of c. 1277 A.D. is dredged up from the waters near the southern coast of China with 12 compartments in its hull. It confirms the descriptions of bulkheaded hull compartments for junks in Zhu Yu's Pingzhou Table Talks of 1119.

== Births ==
=== January ===
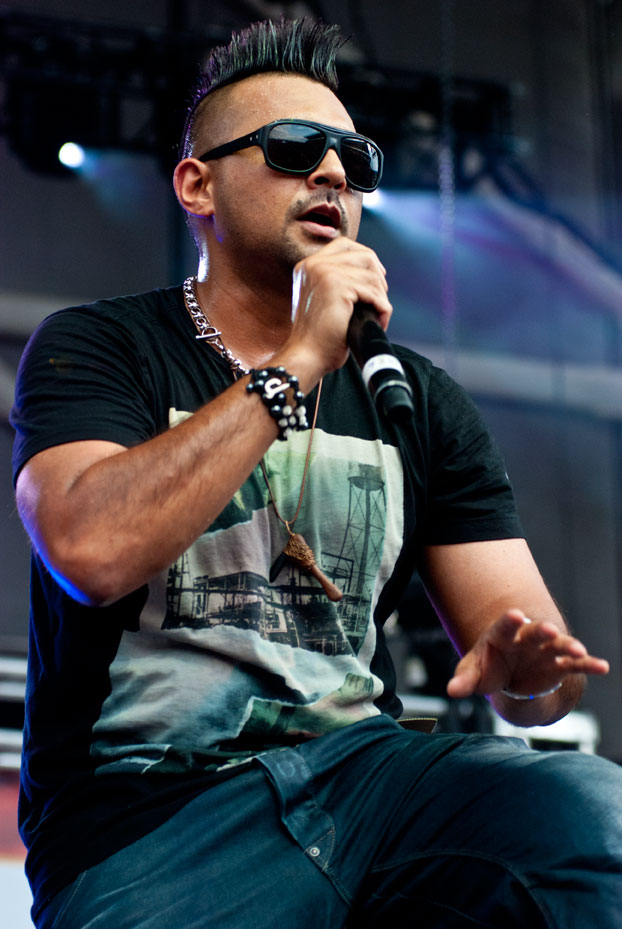
Sean Paul

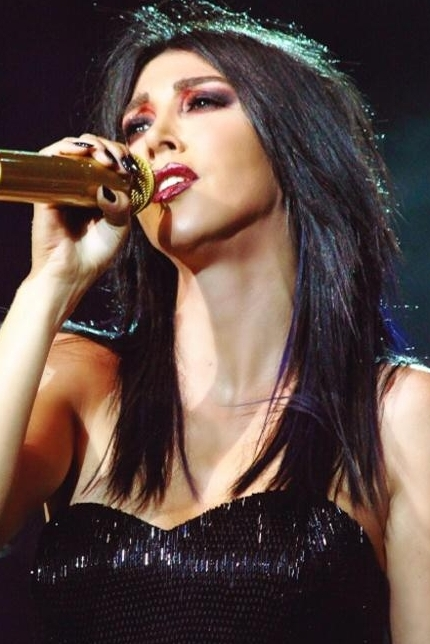
Hande Yener

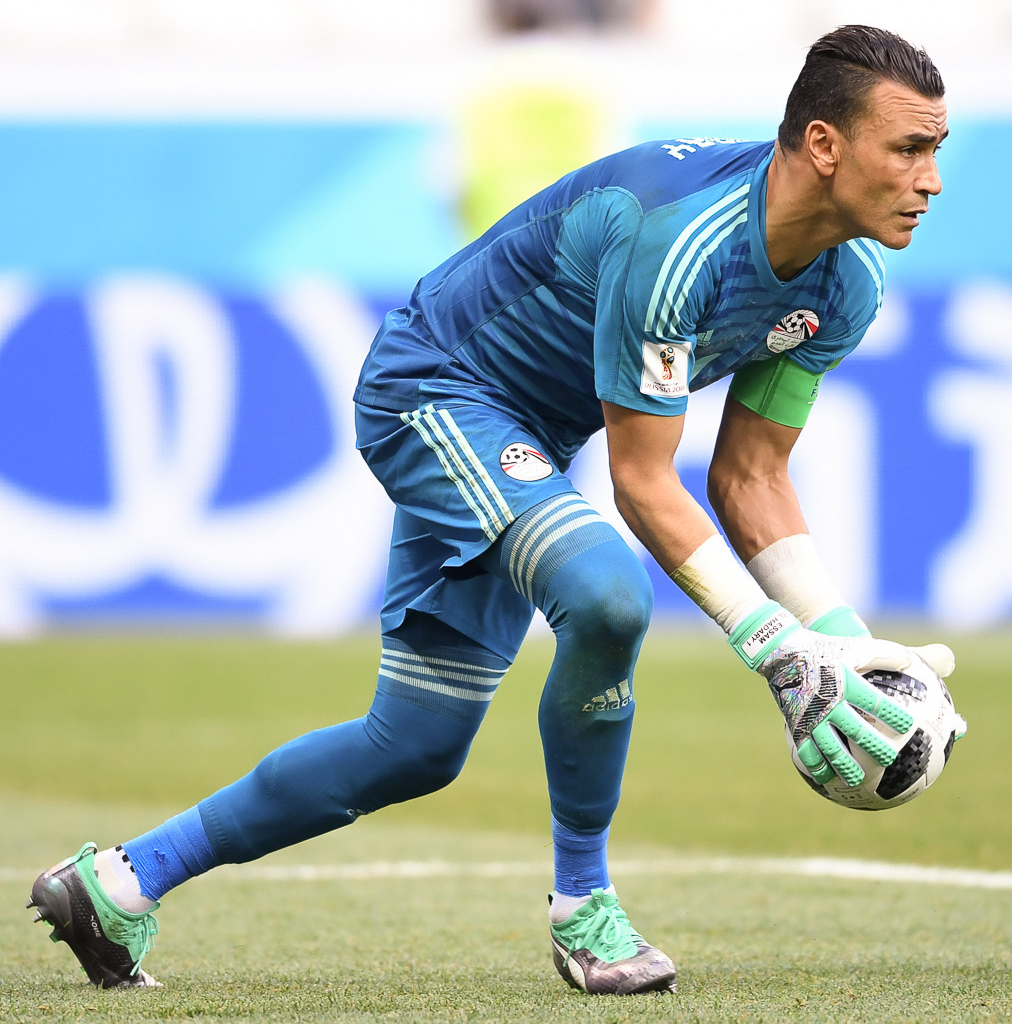
Essam El Hadary

- January 1 – Shelda Bede, Brazilian beach volleyball player
- January 9 – Sean Paul, Jamaican singer
- January 11 – Rahul Dravid, Indian cricket player and coach.
- January 12 – Hande Yener, Turkish singer
- January 13 – Nikolai Khabibulin, Russian ice hockey player
- January 17
  - Cuauhtémoc Blanco, Mexican footballer and politician, Governor of Morelos 2018-2024
  - Johnny Hajjar, French politician
- January 19
  - Ann Kristin Aarønes, Norwegian footballer
  - Yevgeny Sadovyi, Russian swimmer
- January 20 – Queen Mathilde of Belgium
- January 22 – Rogério Ceni, Brazilian football player and coach
- January 26 – Brendan Rodgers, Northern Irish football manager
- January 30 – Jalen Rose, American basketball player
- January 31 – Portia de Rossi, Australian-American actress

=== February ===
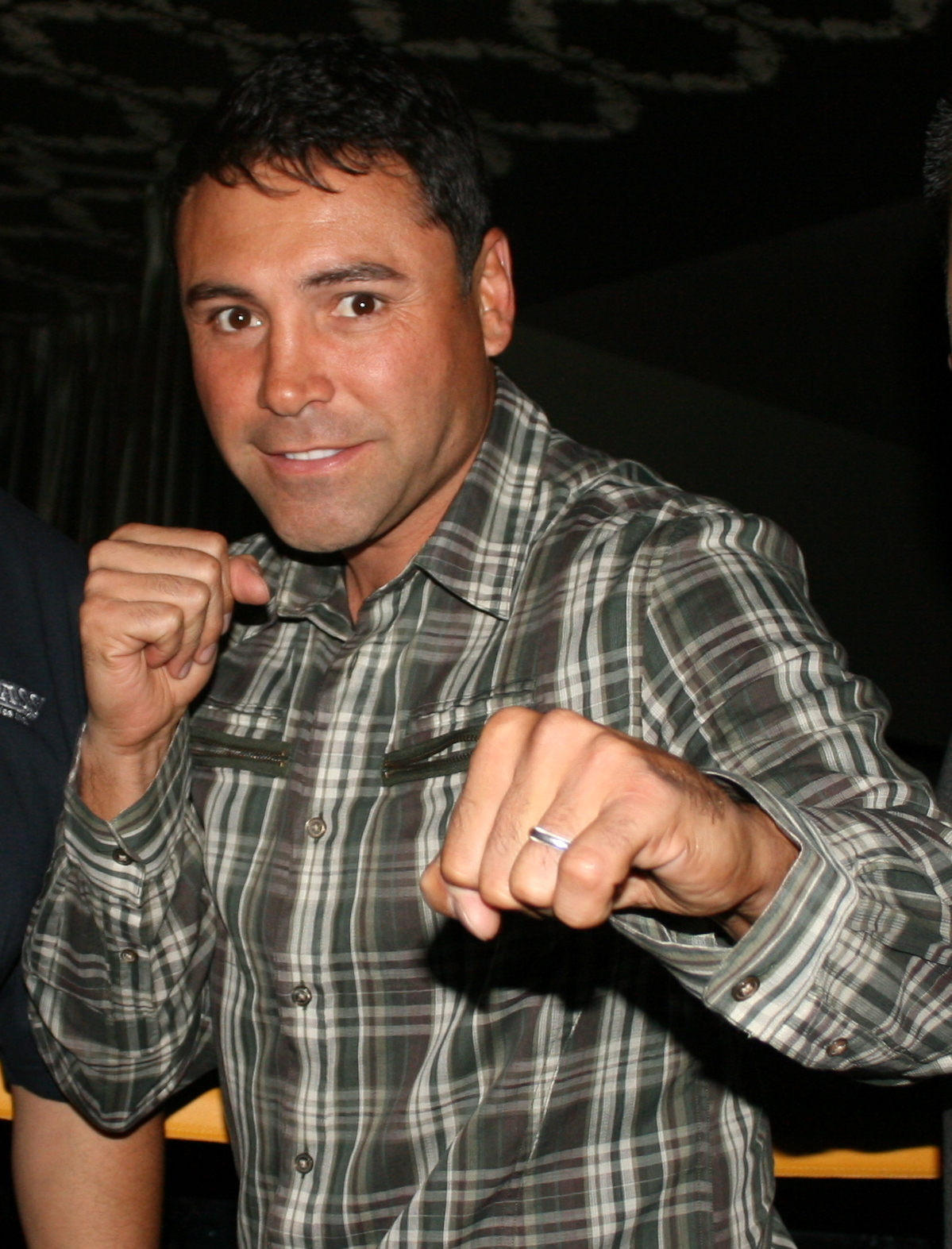
Oscar De La Hoya

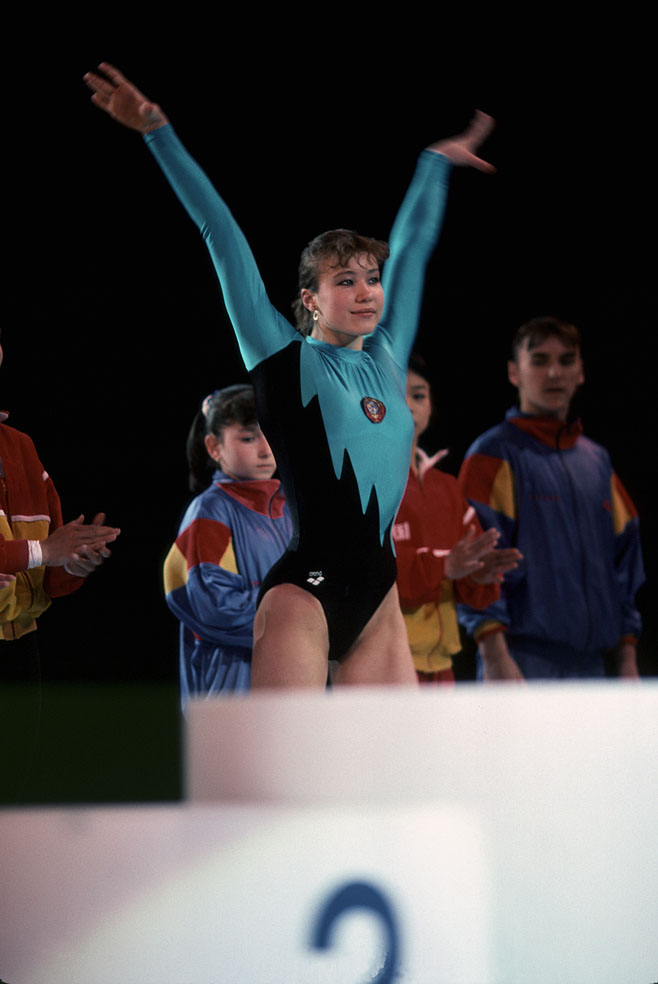
Svetlana Boginskaya

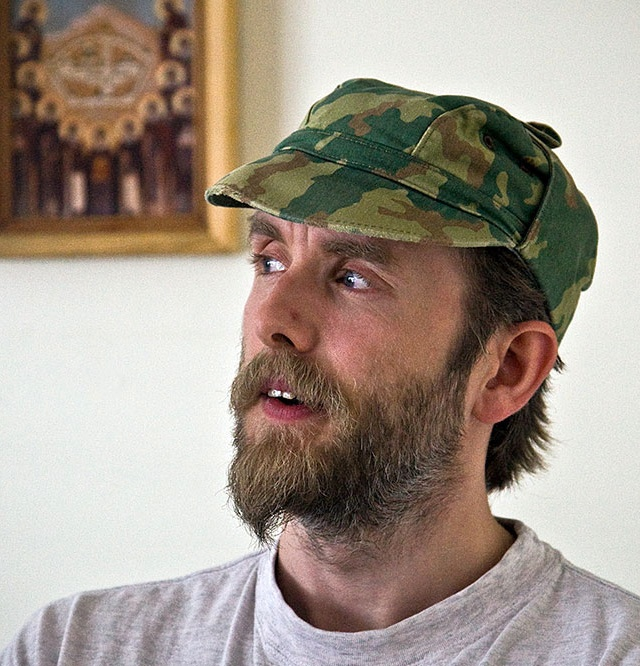
Varg Vikernes

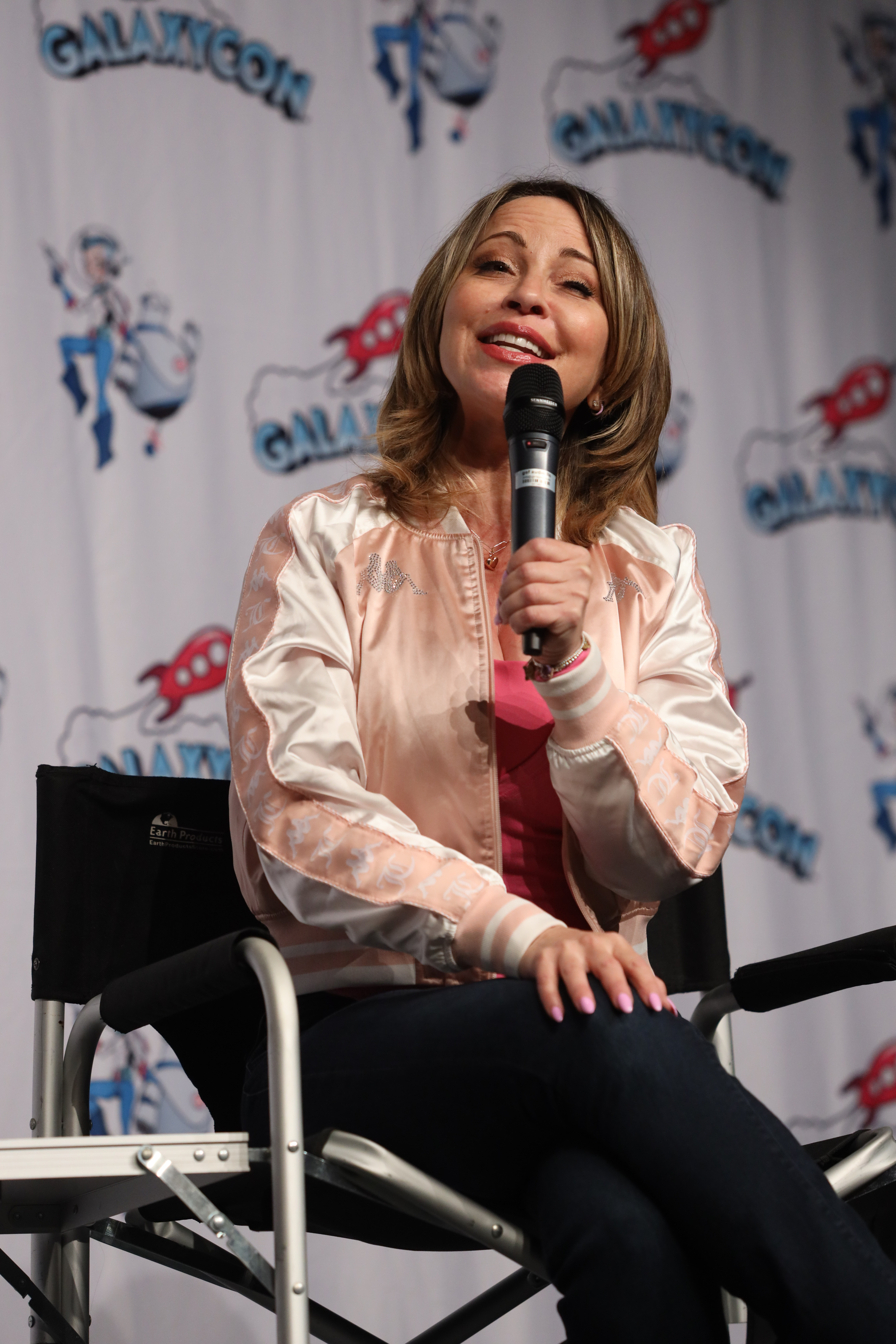
Tara Strong

- February 1 – Óscar Pérez Rojas, Mexican football goalkeeper
- February 4 – Oscar De La Hoya, American boxer
- February 5
  - Trijntje Oosterhuis, Dutch pop singer
  - Deng Yaping, Chinese table tennis player
  - Luke Ricketson, Australian rugby league player
- February 9 – Svetlana Boginskaya, Soviet gymnast
- February 10 – Gunn-Rita Dahle, Norwegian mountain biker
- February 11
  - Jeon Do-yeon, South Korean actress
  - Varg Vikernes, Norwegian rock musician and convicted murderer
- February 12 – Tara Strong, Canadian actress and voice actress
- February 15
  - Anna Dogonadze, German trampoline gymnast
  - Amy Van Dyken, American swimmer
- February 16 – Cathy Freeman, Australian athlete
- February 18 – Claude Makélélé, French footballer
- February 22 – Shota Arveladze, Georgian football player and coach
- February 24
  - Alexei Kovalev, Russian ice hockey player
  - Yordan Yovchev, Bulgarian gymnast
- February 25 – Julio Iglesias Jr., Spanish singer
- February 26
  - ATB, German DJ and music producer
  - Ole Gunnar Solskjær, Norwegian footballer
  - Jenny Thompson, American swimmer
- February 27
  - Peter Andre, English singer and television personality
  - Li Bingbing, Chinese actress
- February 28 – Eric Lindros, Canadian hockey player

=== March ===
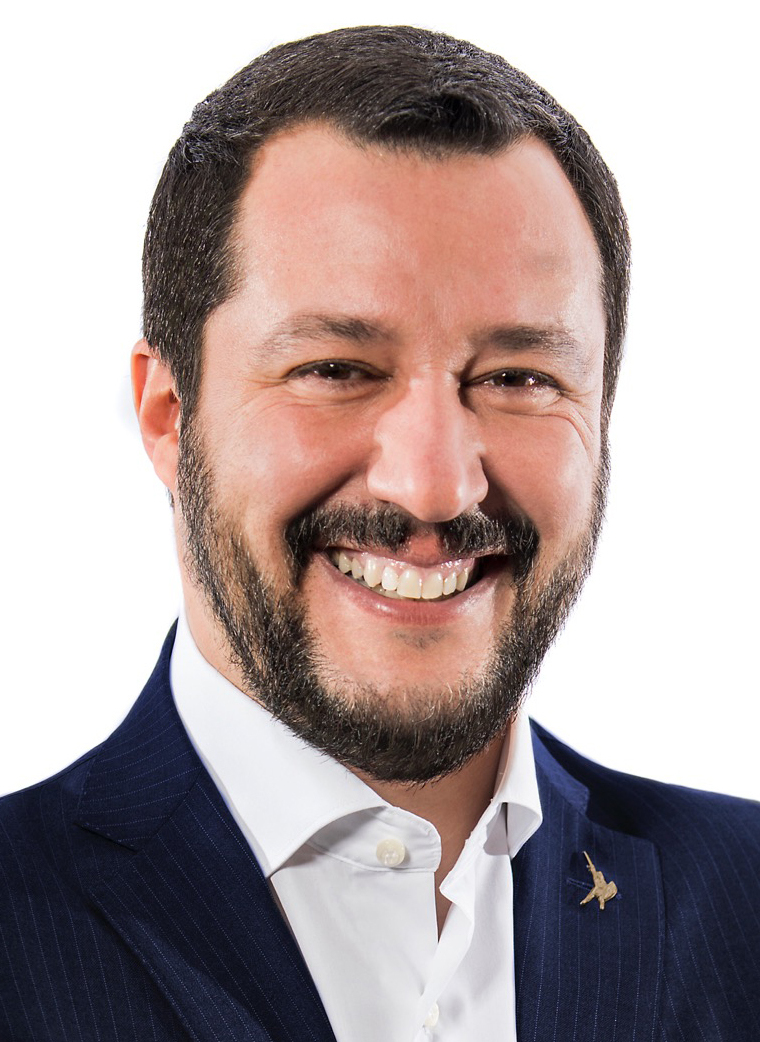
Matteo Salvini

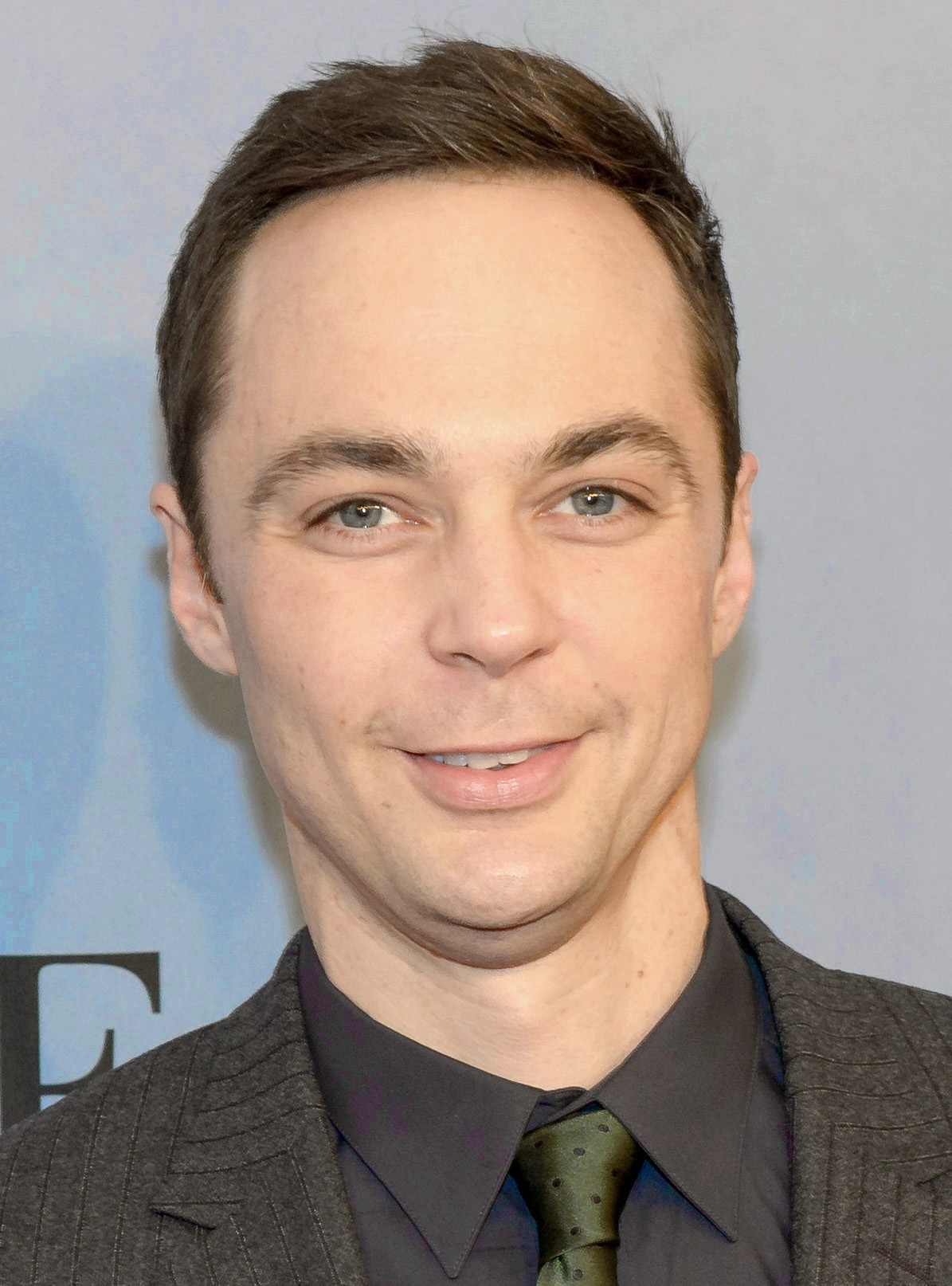
Jim Parsons

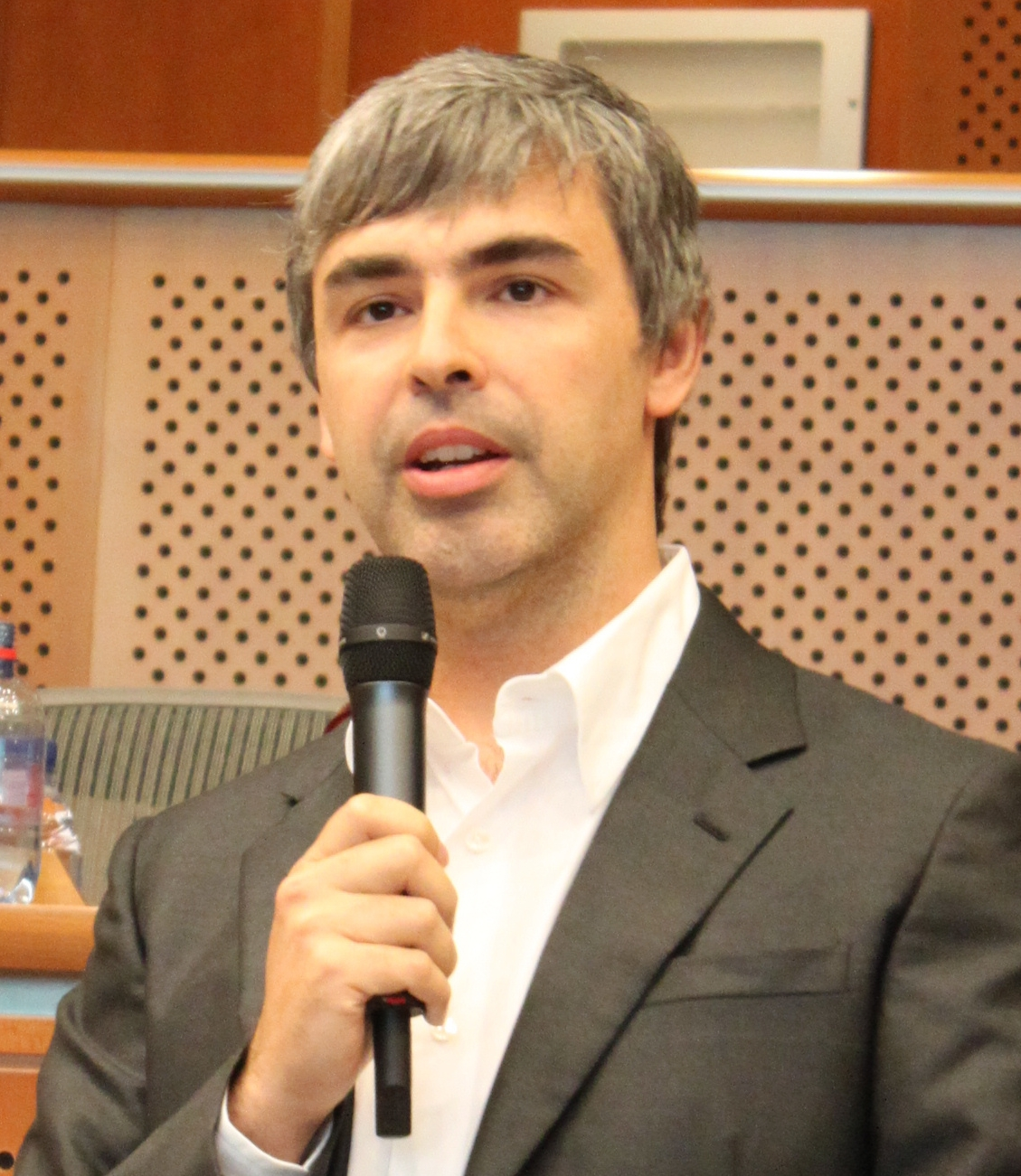
Larry Page

- March 1
  - Jack Davenport, English actor
  - Chris Webber, American basketball player
- March 2 – Vidya Malvade, Indian actress
- March 3 – Dejan Bodiroga, Serbian basketball player
- March 9 – Matteo Salvini, Italian politician
- March 10 – Eva Herzigová, Czech model and actress
- March 13
  - Edgar Davids, Dutch footballer
  - Ólafur Darri Ólafsson, Icelandic actor
- March 17 – Caroline Corr, Irish musician (The Corrs)
- March 19 – Magnus Hedman, Swedish footballer
- March 23
  - Jerzy Dudek, Polish footballer
  - Jason Kidd, American basketball player
- March 24
  - Jacek Bąk, Polish footballer
  - Jim Parsons, American actor and comedian
- March 25 – Anders Fridén, Swedish musician
- March 26 – Larry Page, American entrepreneur, founder and CEO of Google (2011–2015)
- March 28 – Umaga, Samoan-American professional wrestler (d. 2009)
- March 29 – Marc Overmars, Dutch footballer
- March 30 – Jan Koller, Czech footballer

=== April ===
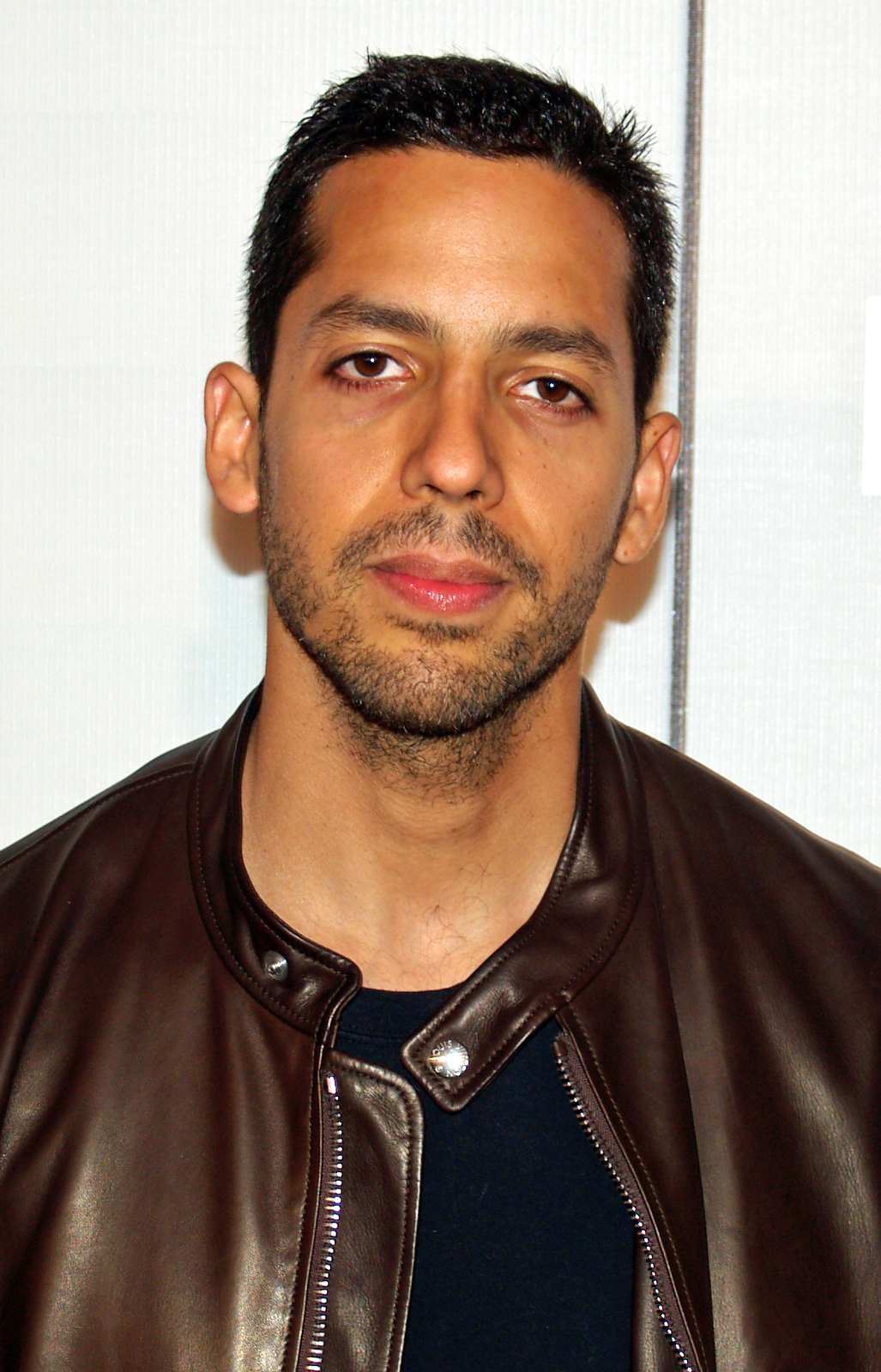
David Blaine

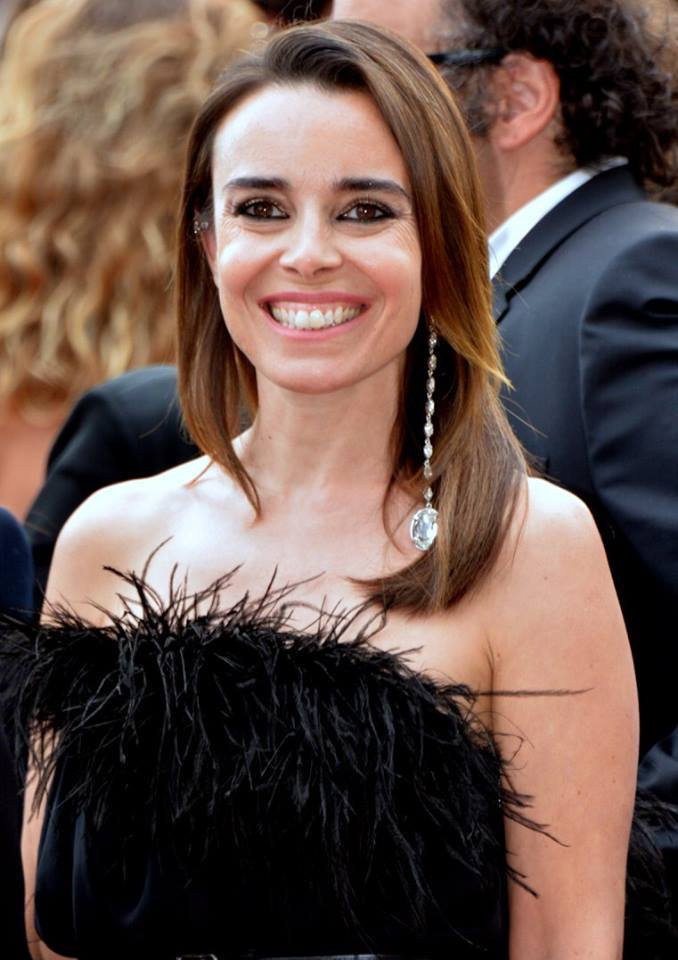
Elodie Bouchez

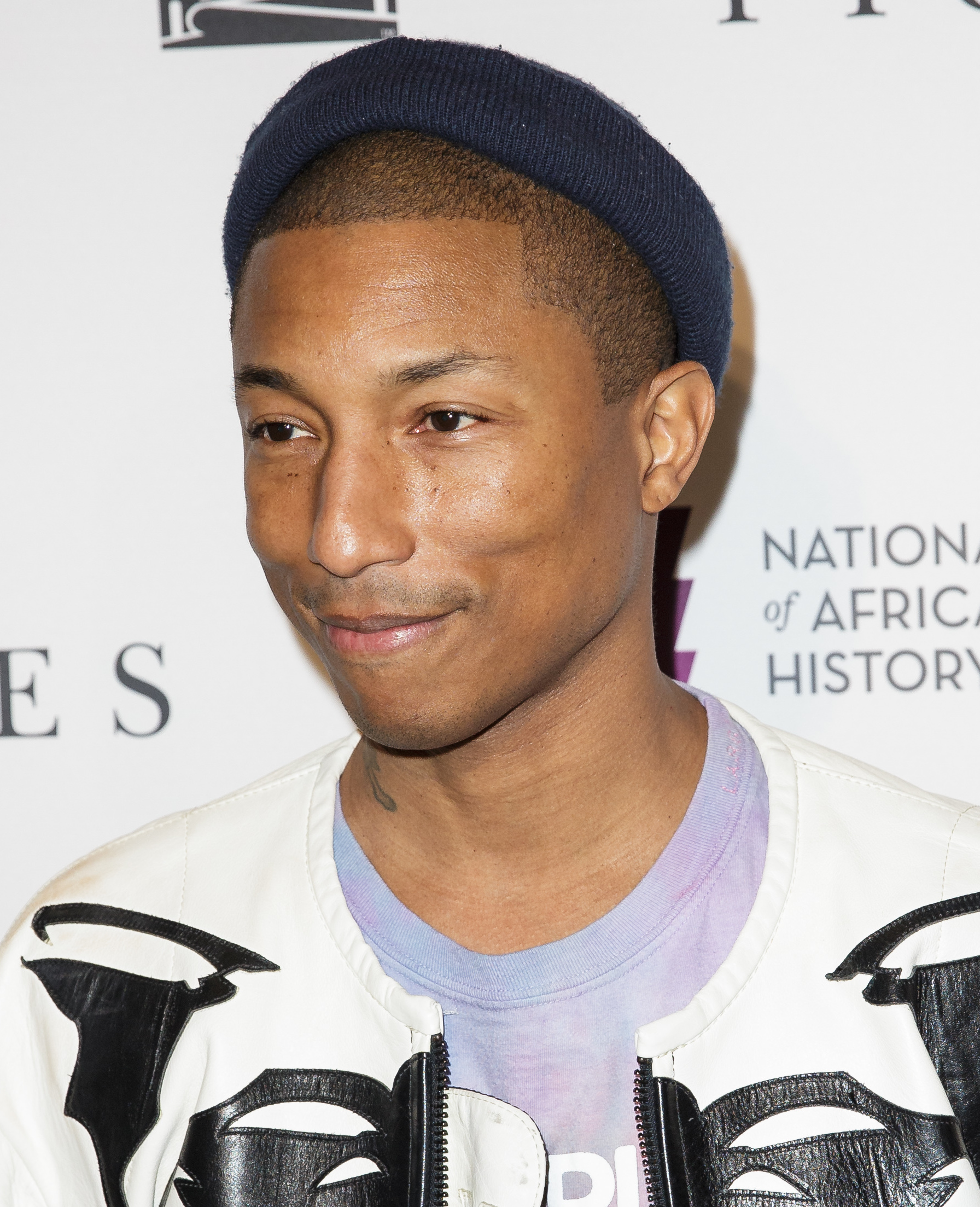
Pharrell Williams

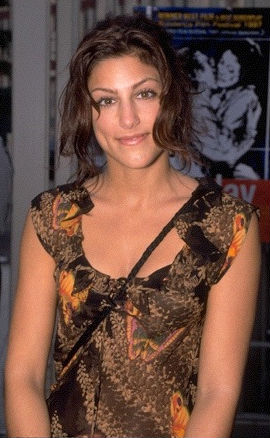
Jennifer Esposito

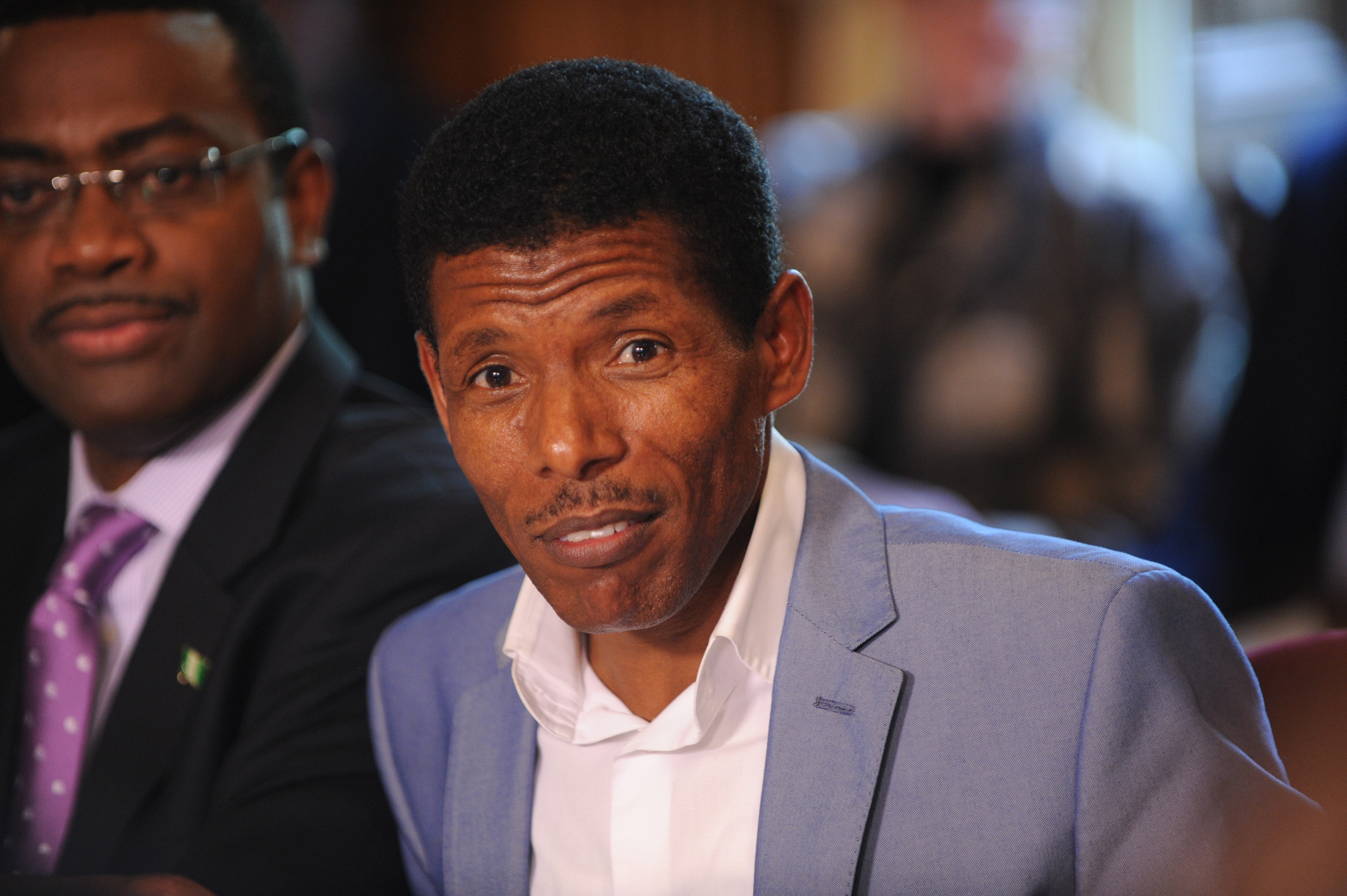
Haile Gebrselassie

- April 1
  - Stephen Fleming, New Zealand cricket captain
  - Rachel Maddow, American political commentator
- April 2 – Roselyn Sánchez, Puerto Rican-American actress
- April 4
  - David Blaine, American magician
  - Loris Capirossi, Italian motorcycle racer
- April 5
  - Élodie Bouchez, French actress
  - Pharrell Williams, American musician and producer
- April 6 – Rie Miyazawa, Japanese actress and singer
- April 8 – Emma Caulfield, American actress
- April 10 – Roberto Carlos, Brazilian footballer
- April 11 – Jennifer Esposito, American actress
- April 12
  - Juan Caguaripano, Venezuelan military officer and torture victim
  - Christina Moore, American actress
  - Amr Waked, Egyptian film, television and stage actor
- April 13 – Sergey Shnurov, Russian singer
- April 14
  - Roberto Ayala, Argentine footballer
  - Adrien Brody, American actor
- April 16 – Akon, Senegalese American rapper, R&B singer-songwriter and record producer
- April 18 – Haile Gebrselassie, Ethiopian long-distance runner
- April 19 – George Gregan, Australian rugby union footballer
- April 21 – Katsuyuki Konishi, Japanese voice actor
- April 23 – Cem Yılmaz, Turkish comedian and actor
- April 24
  - Sachin Tendulkar, Indian cricketer
  - Lee Westwood, English golfer
- April 27 – Sharlee D'Angelo, Swedish guitarist
- April 28
  - Jorge Garcia, American actor and comedian
  - Pauleta, Portuguese footballer
  - Elisabeth Röhm, German-American actress
- April 29 – David Belle, French actor and stunt performer

=== May ===
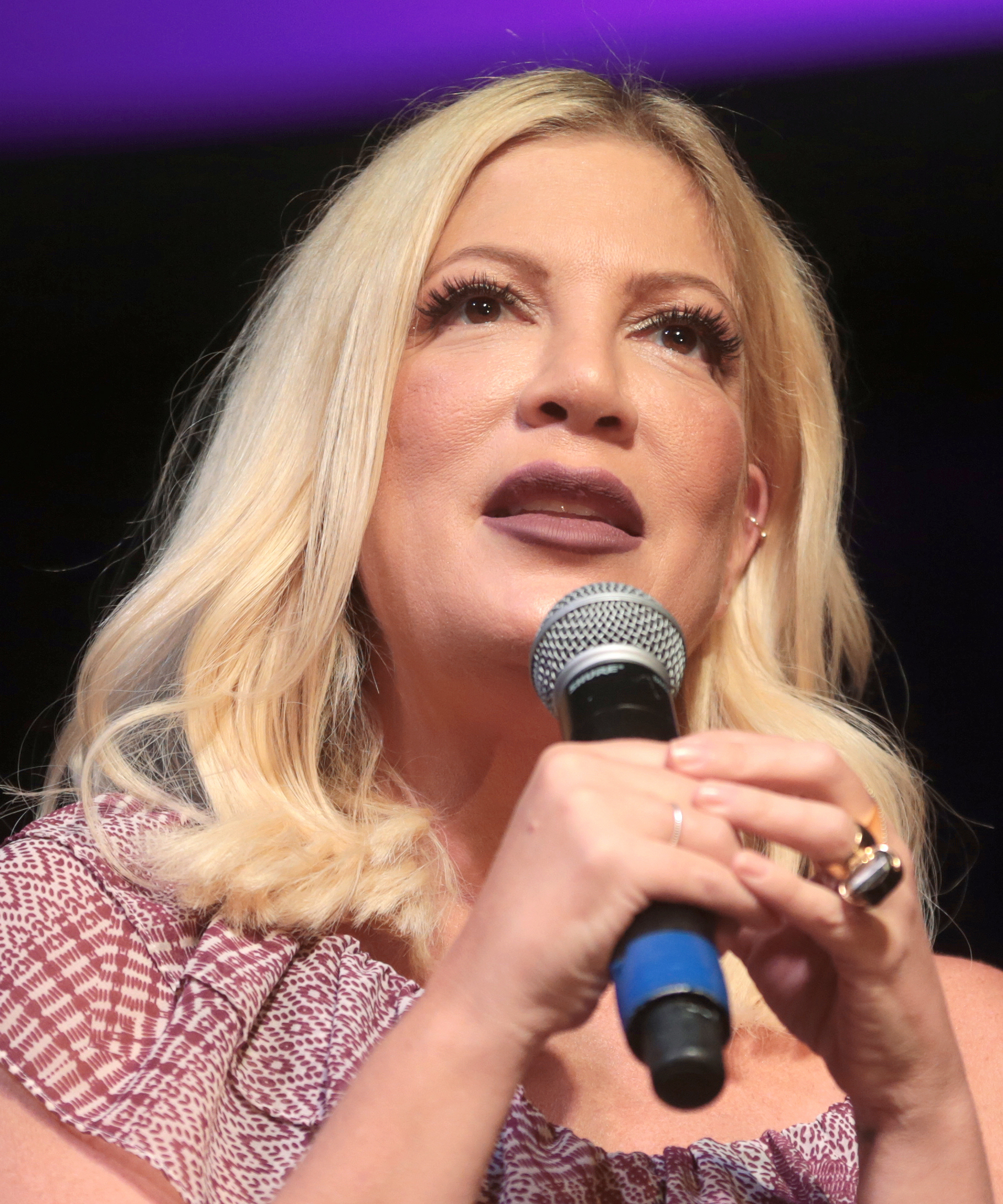
Tori Spelling

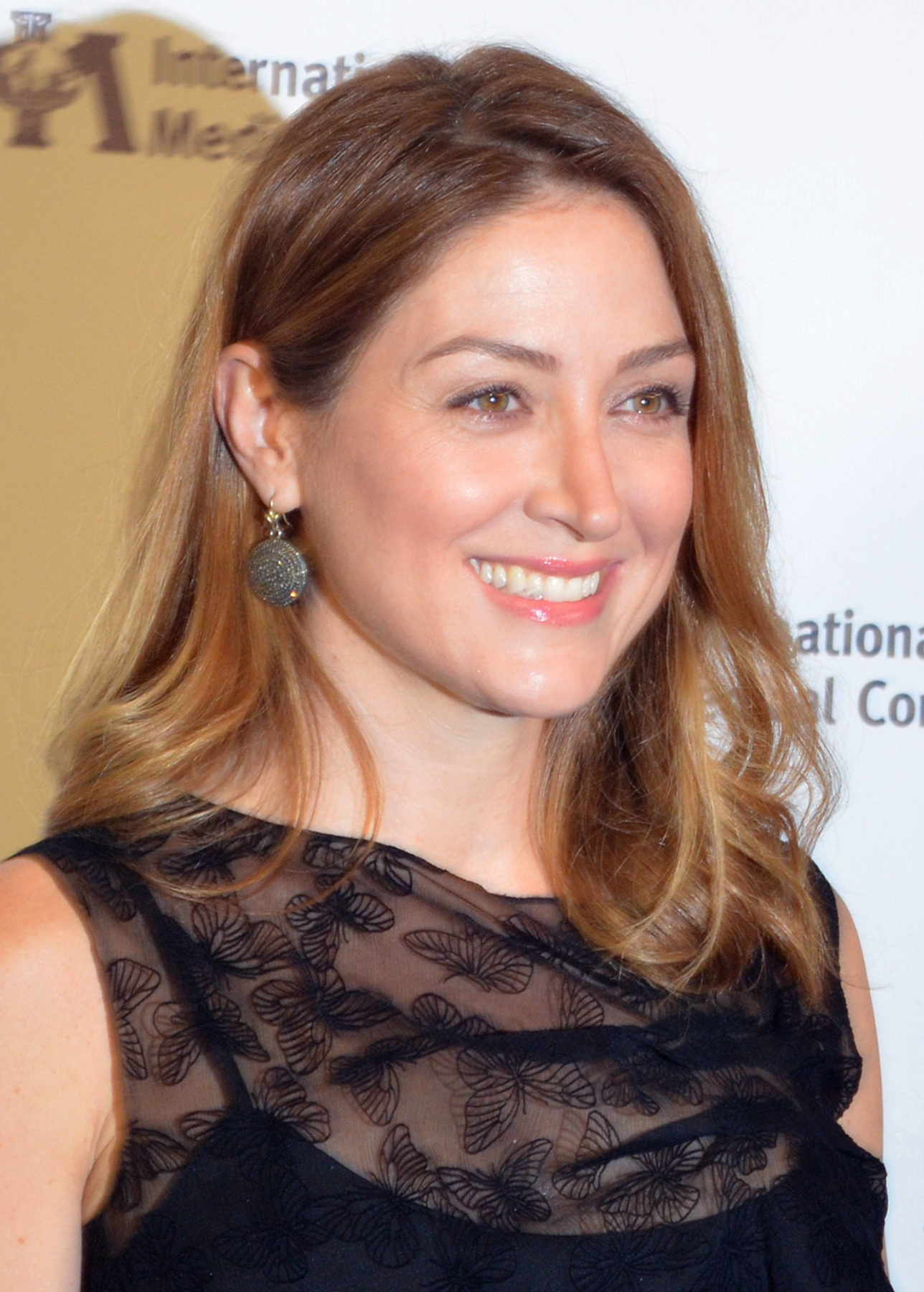
Sasha Alexander

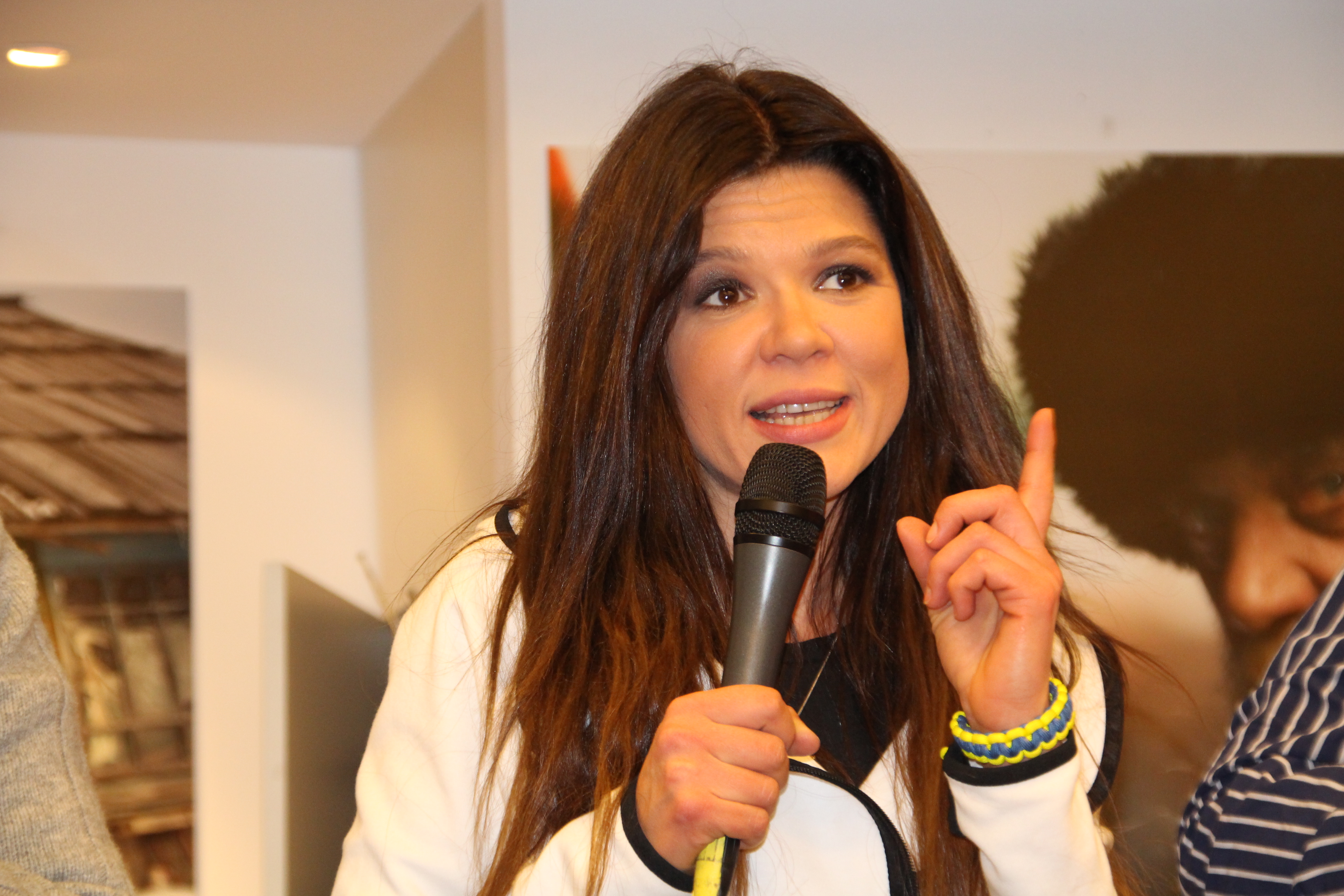
Ruslana

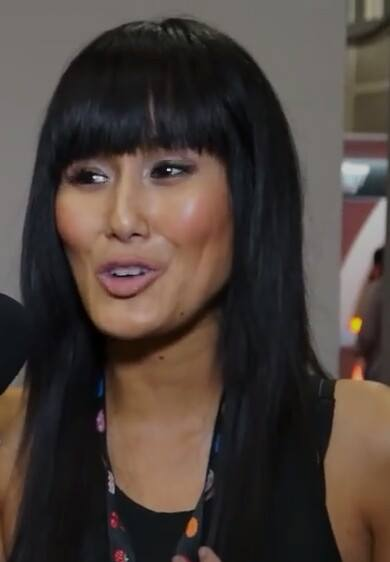
Minae Noji

- May 1
  - Paul Burke, Irish rugby player
  - Diana Hayden, Miss World and Indian actress
  - Oliver Neuville, German footballer
- May 2 – Florian Henckel von Donnersmarck, German director
- May 3 – Michael Reiziger, Dutch footballer
- May 4 – Guillermo Barros Schelotto, Argentine footballer
- May 5 – Johan Hedberg ("Moose"), Swedish hockey goaltender
- May 7 – Paolo Savoldelli, Italian professional road racing cyclist
- May 8 – Hiromu Arakawa, Japanese manga artist
- May 9 – Tegla Loroupe, Kenyan long-distance runner
- May 10
  - Keylla Hernández, Puerto Rican television reporter (d. 2018)
  - Rüştü Reçber, Turkish football goalkeeper
- May 14
  - Natalie Appleton, Canadian singer (All Saints)
  - Shanice, African-American singer
- May 16
  - Jason Acuña, American skateboarder and actor
  - Tori Spelling, American actress
- May 17
  - Sasha Alexander, American actress
  - Josh Homme, American musician
- May 20 – Elsa Lunghini, French actress and singer
- May 21 – Noel Fielding, British comedian
- May 24
  - Bartolo Colón, Dominican baseball player
  - Ruslana, Ukrainian pop star, activist, Eurovision Song Contest 2004 winner
  - Vladimír Šmicer, Czech footballer
- May 25
  - Jean-Pierre Canlis, American glass artist
  - Demetri Martin, American actor and comedian
- May 27 – Jack McBrayer, American actor and comedian
- May 31 – Dominique van Roost, Belgian tennis player

=== June ===
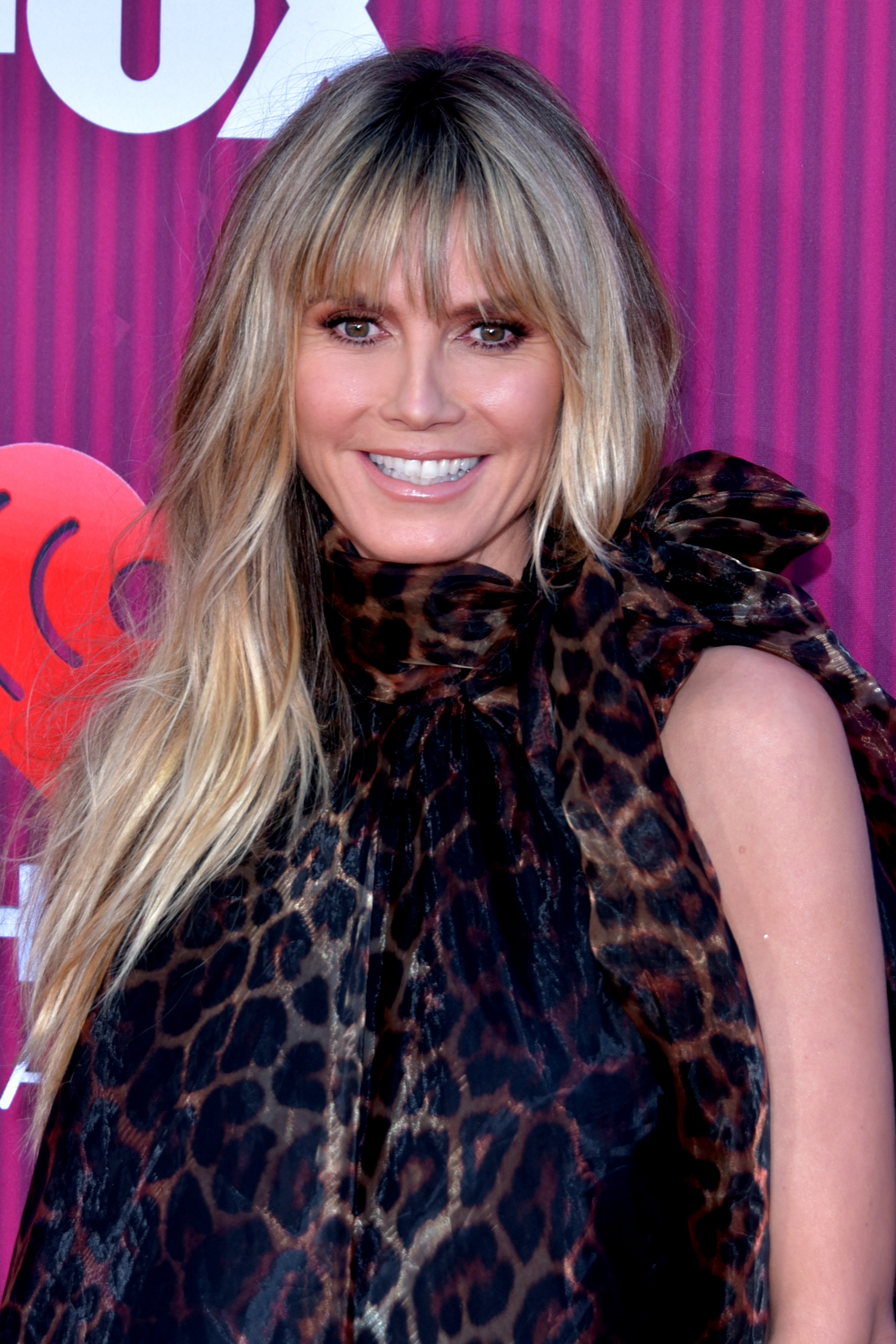
Heidi Klum

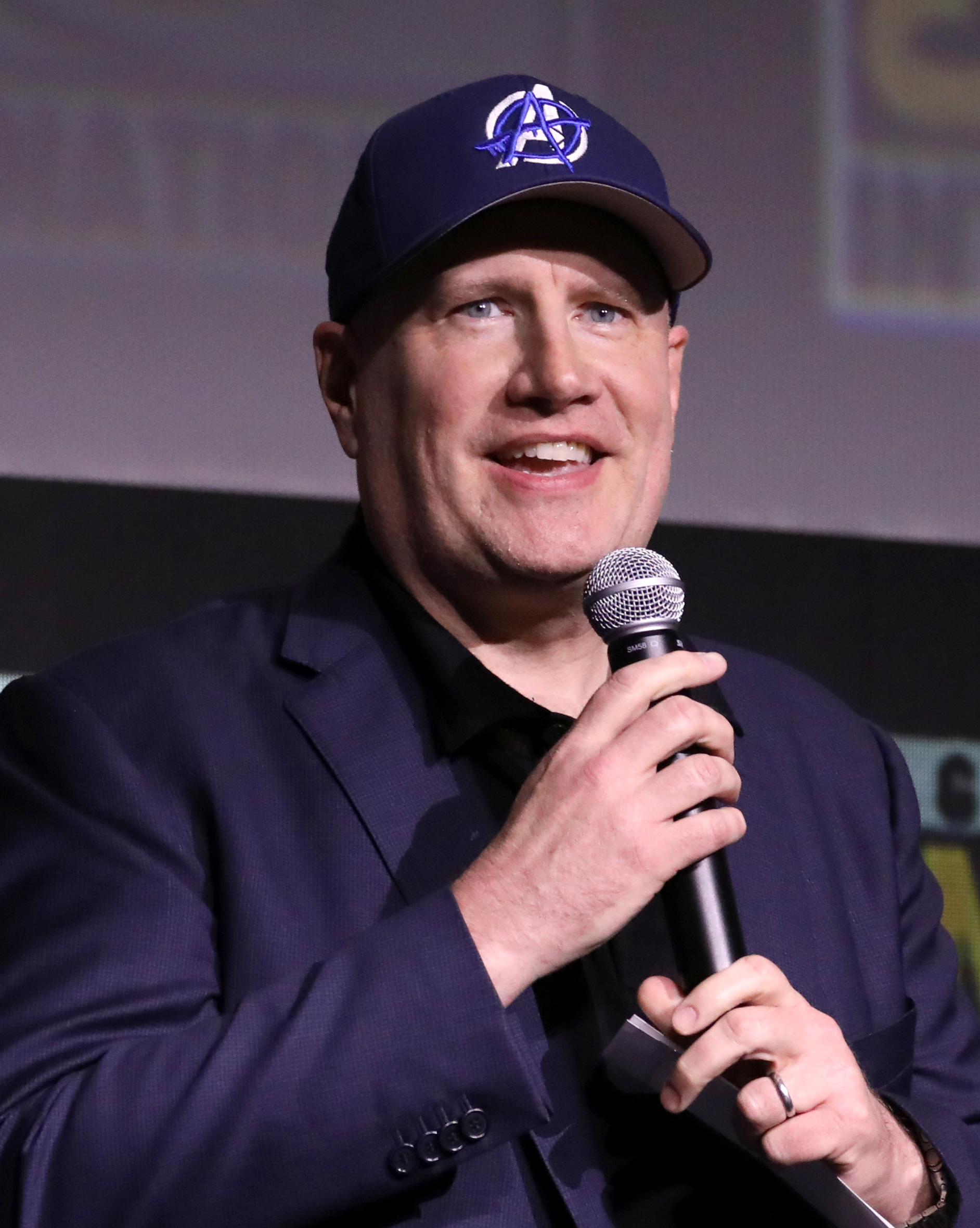
Kevin Feige

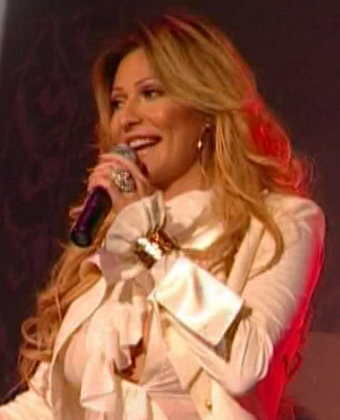
Ceca

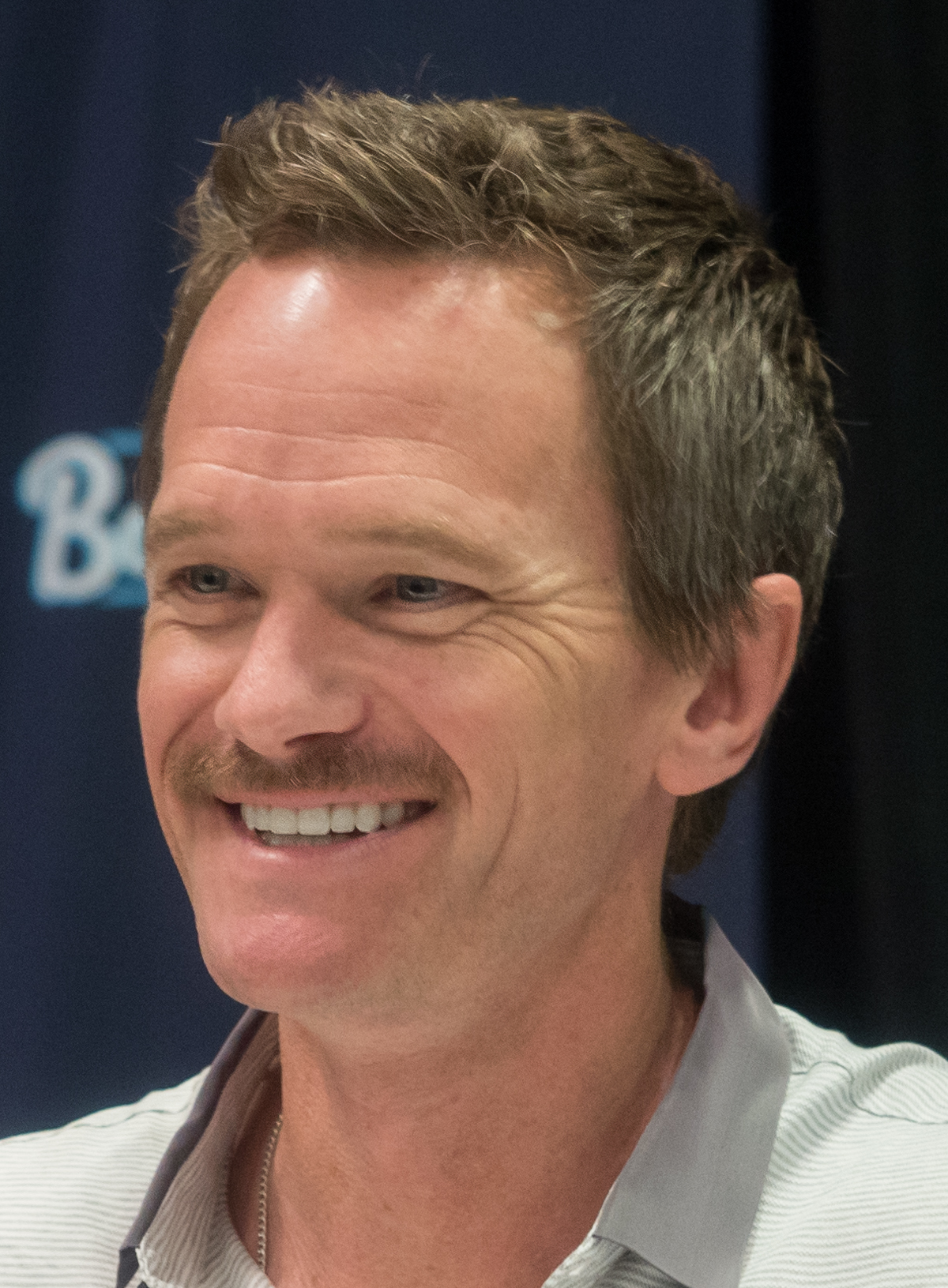
Neil Patrick Harris

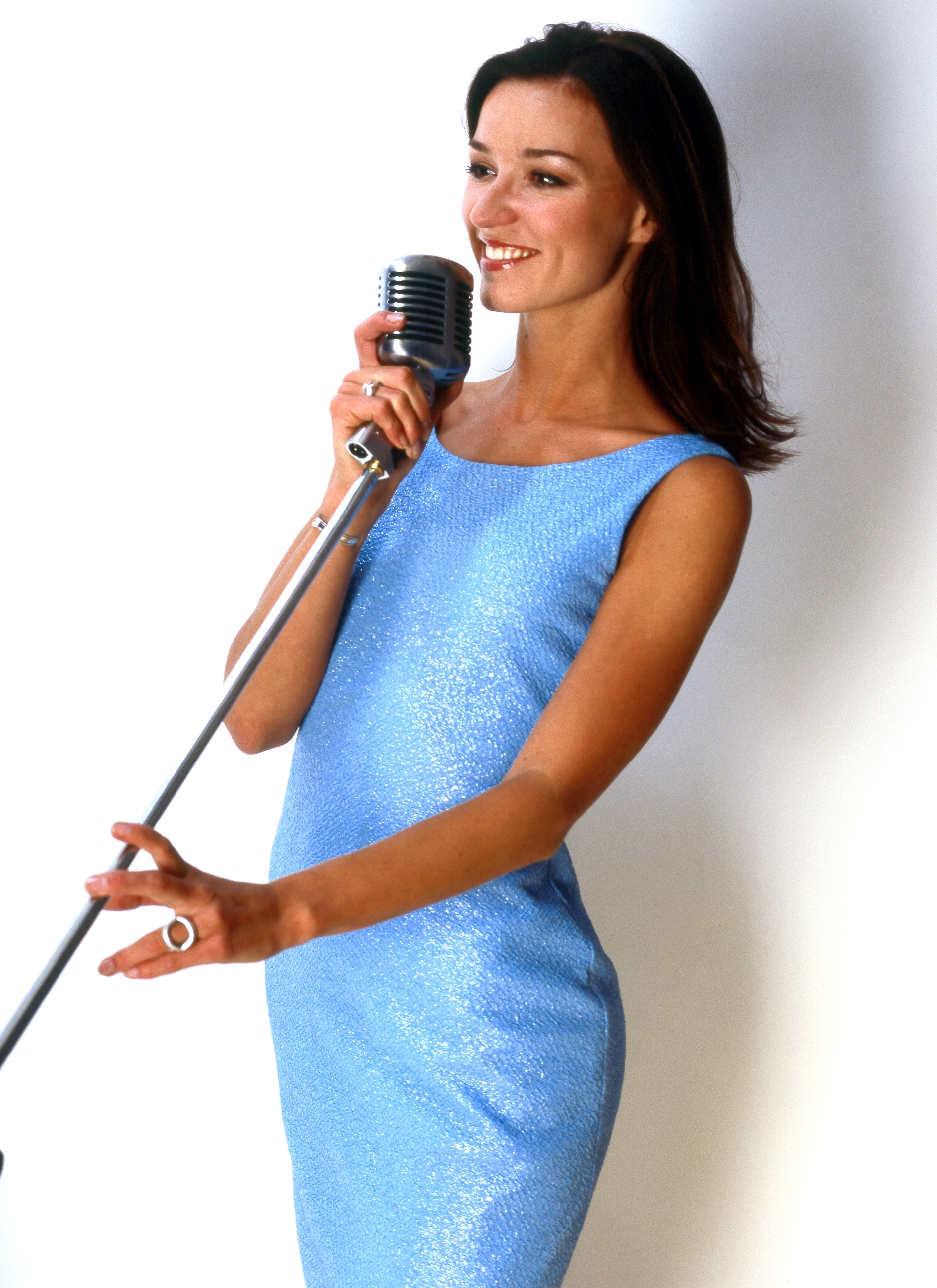
Marija Naumova

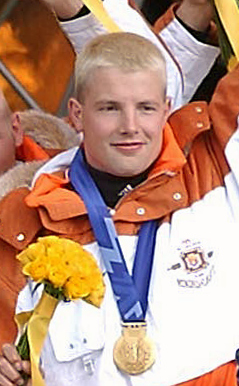
Andre Lange

- June 1
  - Fred Deburghgraeve, Belgian swimmer
  - Adam Garcia, Australian actor and singer
  - Heidi Klum, German model
- June 2
  - Carlos Acosta, Cuban-born ballet dancer
  - Kevin Feige, American film producer and president of Marvel Studios
- June 8 – Lexa Doig, Canadian actress
- June 10 – Faith Evans, American singer
- June 14 – Ceca, Serbian folk singer
- June 15
  - Neil Patrick Harris, American actor, comedian, singer, presenter and host
  - Greg Vaughan, American actor
- June 17
  - Aurélie Filippetti, French politician and novelist
  - Leander Paes, Indian tennis player
- June 19 – Yuko Nakazawa, Japanese singer
- June 20 – Josh Shapiro, American politician, Governor of Pennsylvania
- June 21 – Zuzana Čaputová, Slovak politician, President of Slovakia
- June 22
  - Carson Daly, American television personality, host of NBC's The Voice and Last Call with Carson Daly
  - Giorgio Pasotti, Italian actor and martial arts athlete
- June 23
  - Davies Chisopa, Zambian politician
  - Marija Naumova (Marie N), Latvian singer, Eurovision Song Contest 2002 winner
- June 25 – Jamie Redknapp, English footballer
- June 26 – Paweł Małaszyński, Polish actor
- June 27
  - Olve Eikemo, Norwegian musician
  - Gonzalo López-Gallego, Spanish film director
- June 28
  - Adrián Annus, Hungarian athlete
  - Frost, Norwegian musician
  - Andre Lange, German Olympic bobsledder

=== July ===
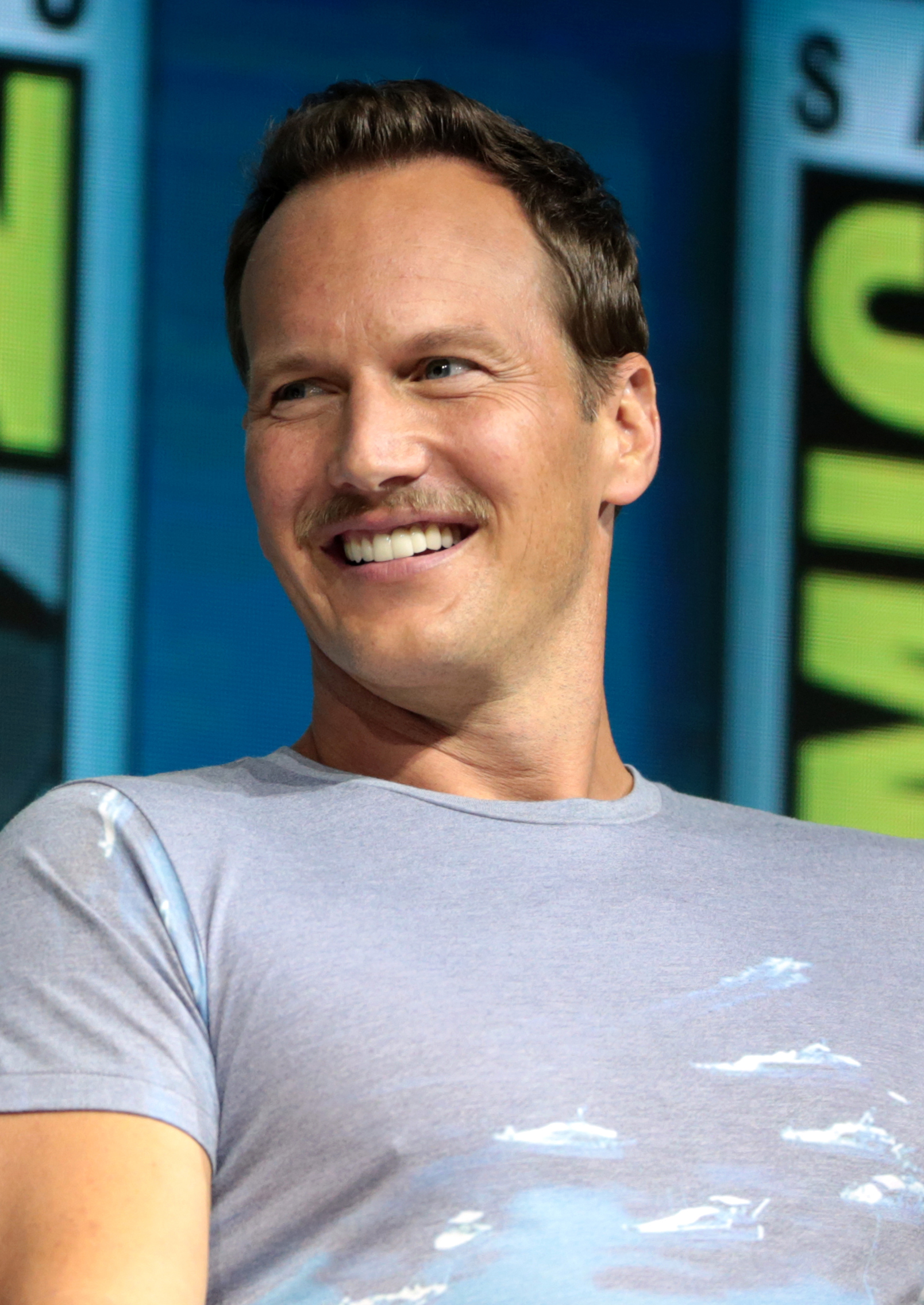
Patrick Wilson

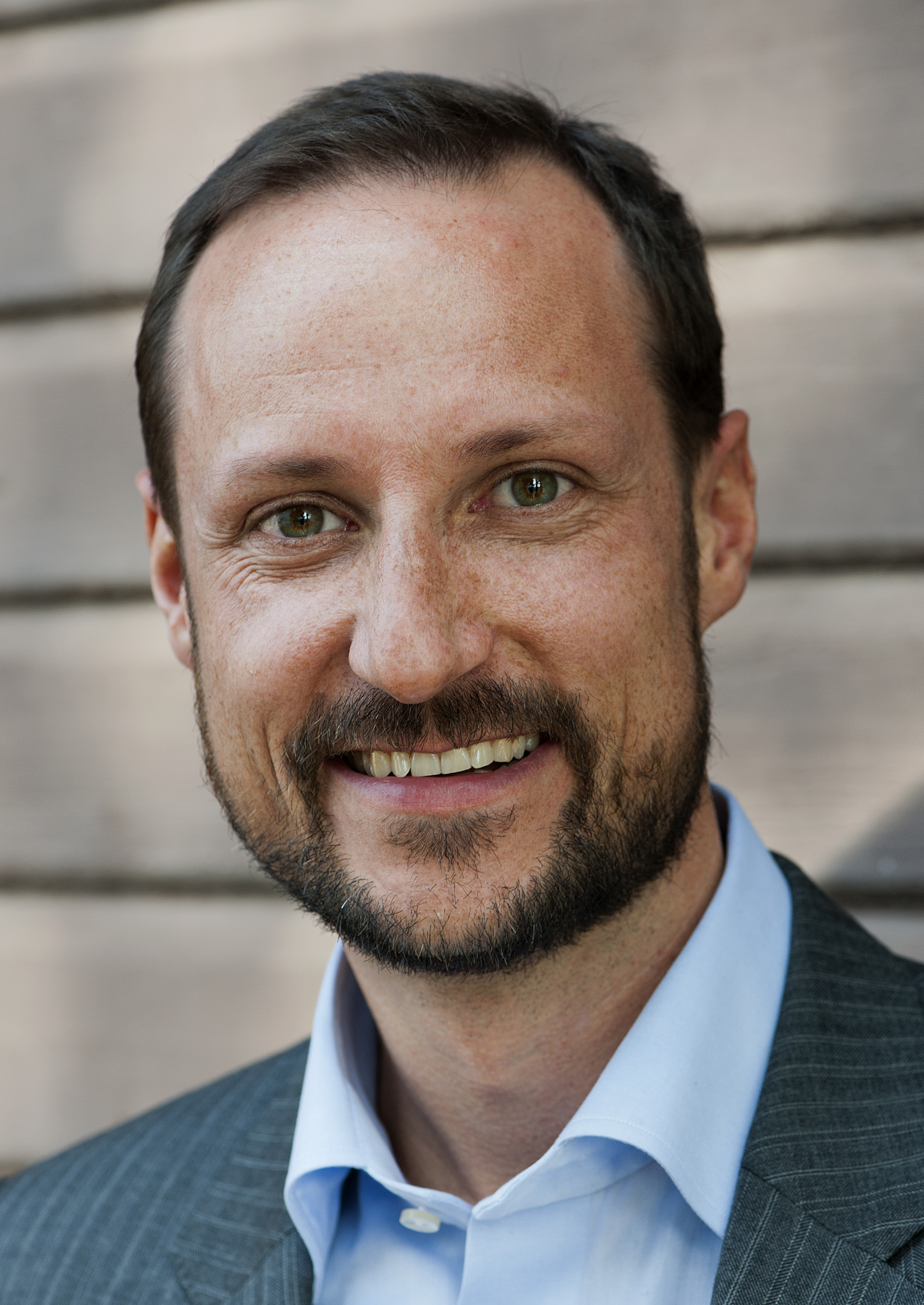
Haakon VIII

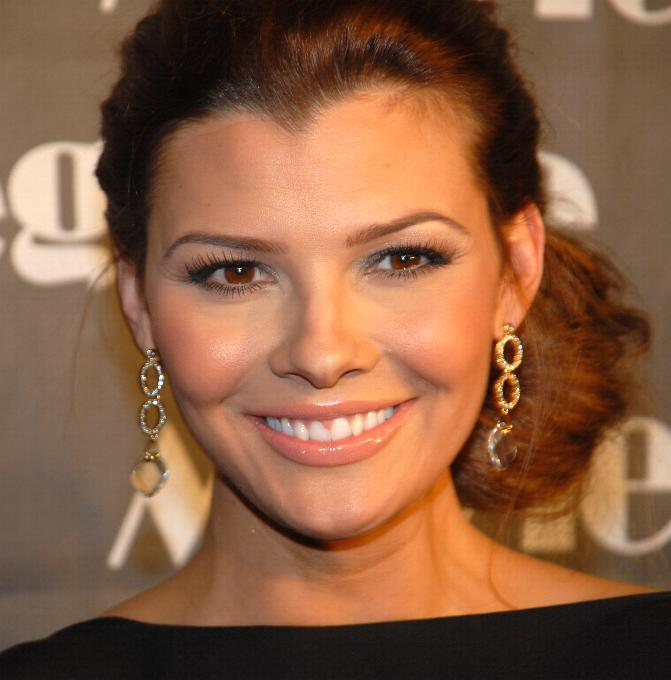
Ali Landry

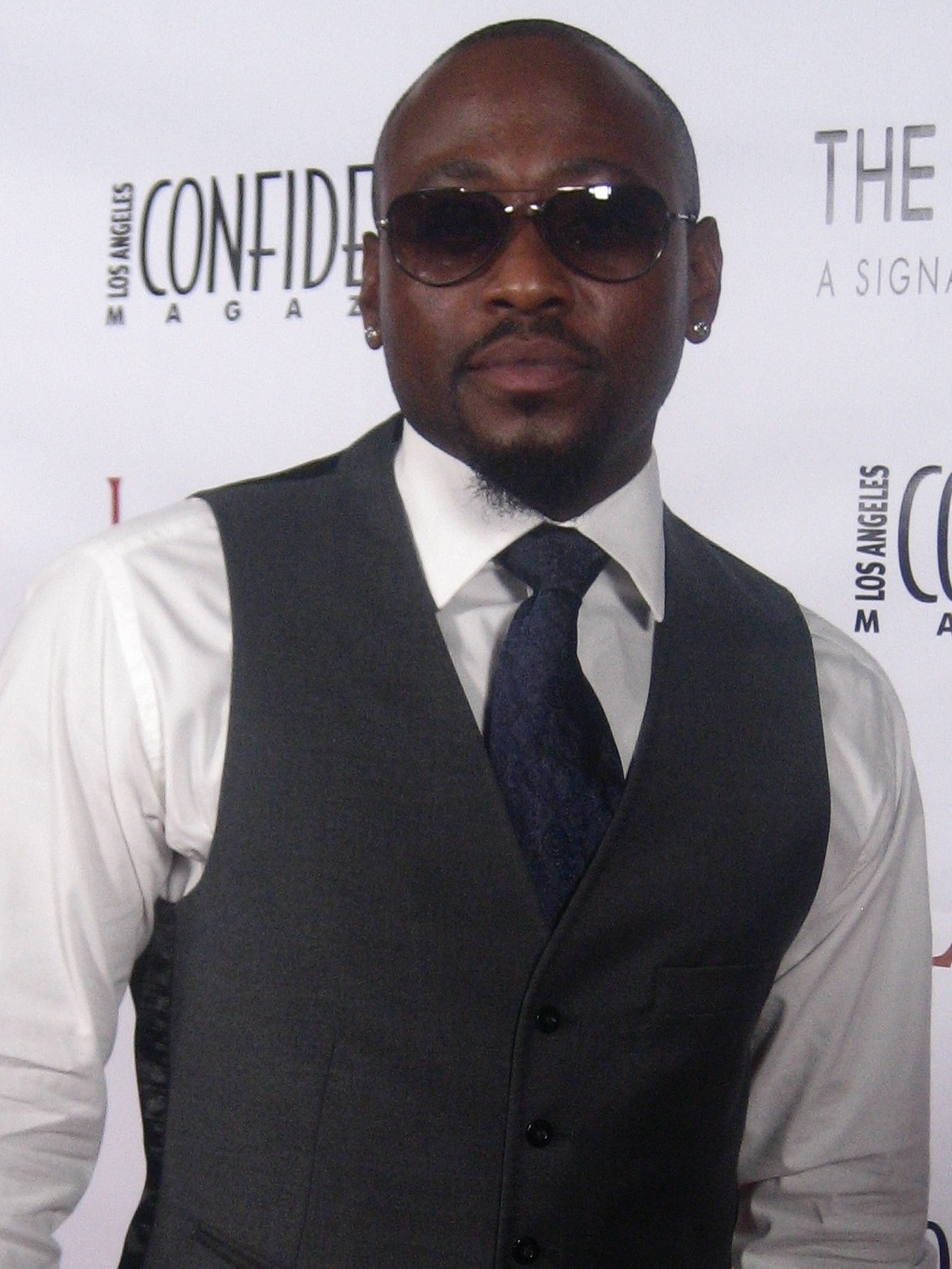
Omar Epps

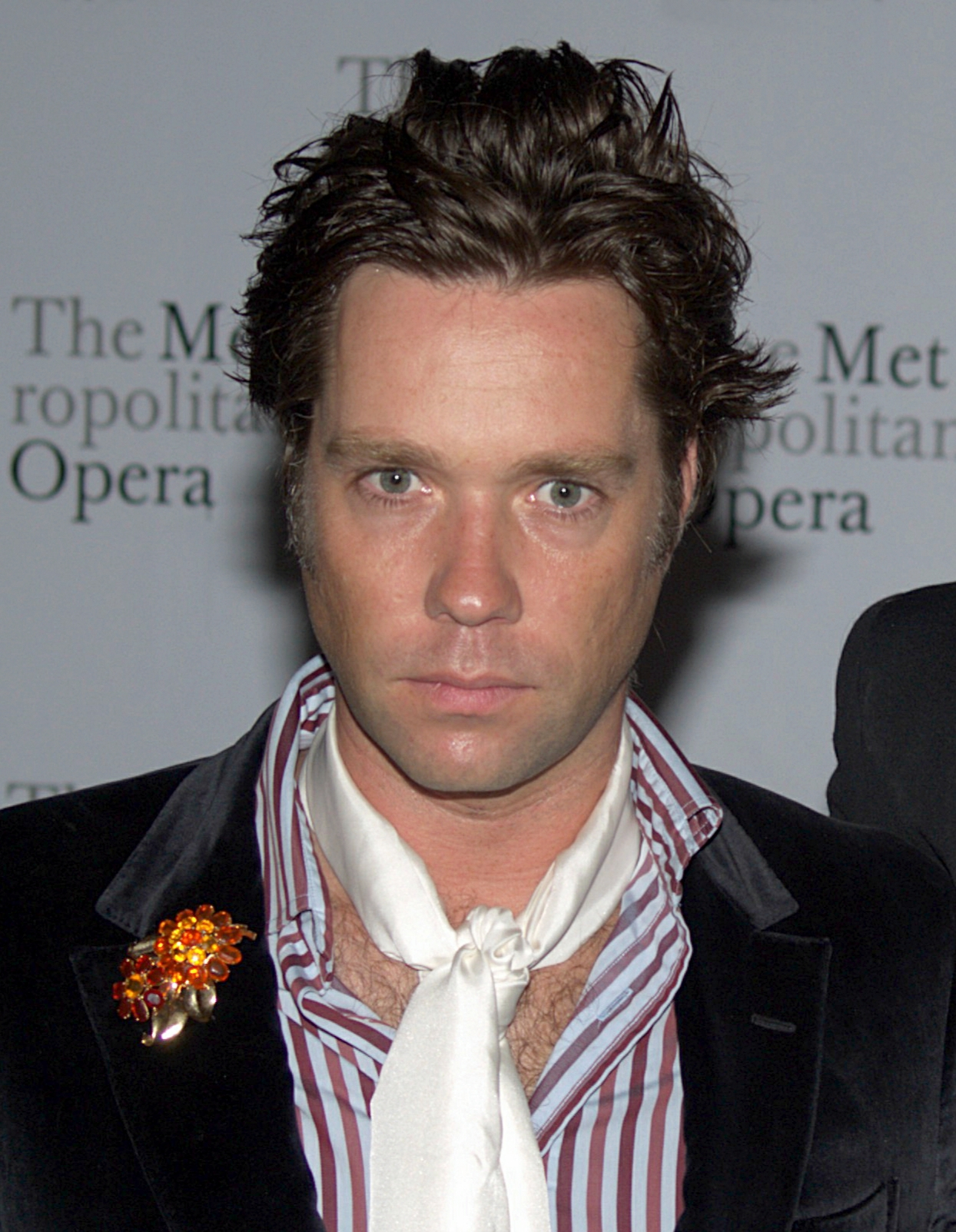
Rufus Wainwright

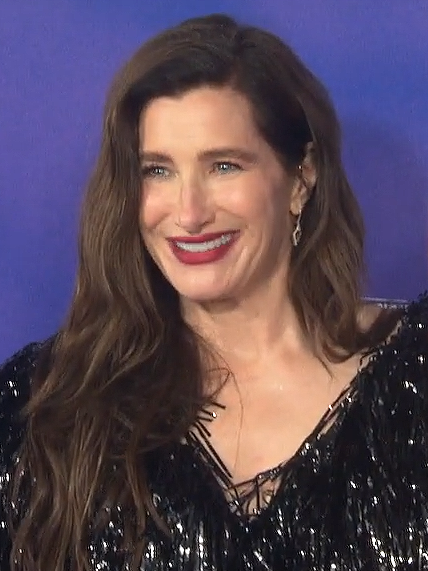
Kathryn Hahn

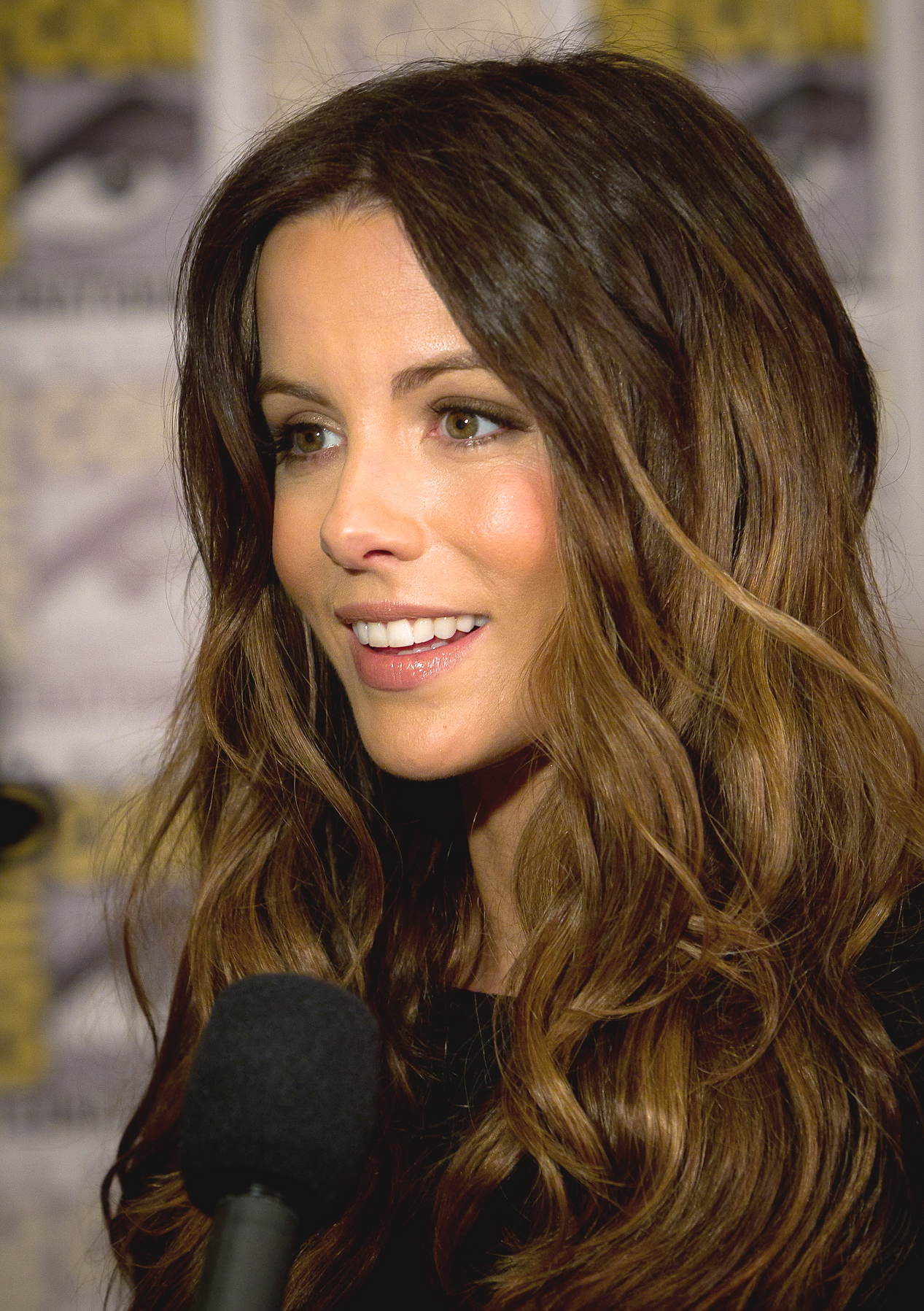
Kate Beckinsale

- July 1 – Akhilesh Yadav, Indian politician
- July 3
  - Alvin Gajadhur, Polish politician, statesman, chemical engineer, and educator
  - Patrick Wilson, American actor
- July 4 – Gackt, Japanese singer-songwriter and actor
- July 5 – Marcus Allbäck, Swedish footballer and coach
- July 7 – Yoon Kyung-shin, South Korean handball player
- July 8 – Kathleen Robertson, Canadian actress and producer
- July 11 – Konstantinos Kenteris, Greek athlete
- July 12
  - Inoke Afeaki, Tongan rugby union footballer
  - Christian Vieri, Italian footballer
- July 13
  - Roberto Martínez, Spanish football manager
  - Danny Williams, British professional boxer
- July 14
  - Halil Mutlu, Bulgaria-born Turkish weightlifter
  - Candela Peña, Spanish actress
- July 16
  - Stefano Garzelli, Italian professional road racing cyclist
  - Sandra Pires, Brazilian beach volleyball player
- July 17 – Daimaou Kosaka, Japanese comedian
- July 18 – Chi In-jin, South Korean boxer
- July 19
  - Aílton, Brazilian football player
  - Raja Krishnamoorthi, Indian born-American politician and lawyer
  - Saïd Taghmaoui, French-American actor and screenwriter
- July 20
  - Omar Epps, American actor
  - Peter Forsberg, Swedish hockey player
  - Haakon VIII, King of Norway
- July 22
  - Rufus Wainwright, American-Canadian singer-songwriter and composer
  - Jaime Camil, Mexican actor and singer
- July 23
  - Kathryn Hahn, American actress
  - Fran Healy, Scottish singer-songwriter
  - Monica Lewinsky, American White House intern
- July 26 – Kate Beckinsale, English actress
- July 30
  - Markus Näslund, Swedish ice hockey player
  - Sonu Nigam, Indian singer

=== August ===
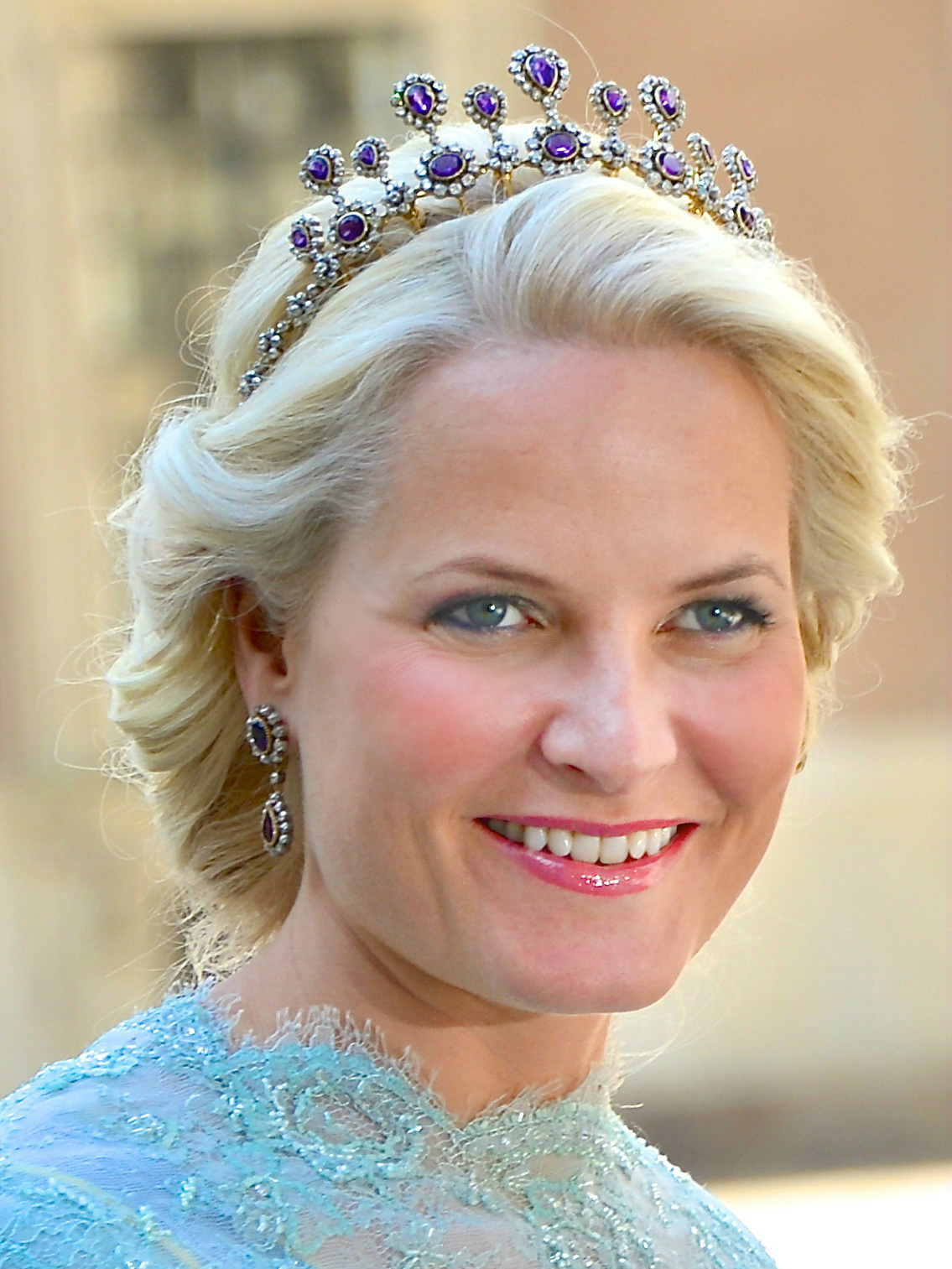
Mette-Marit, Crown Princess of Norway

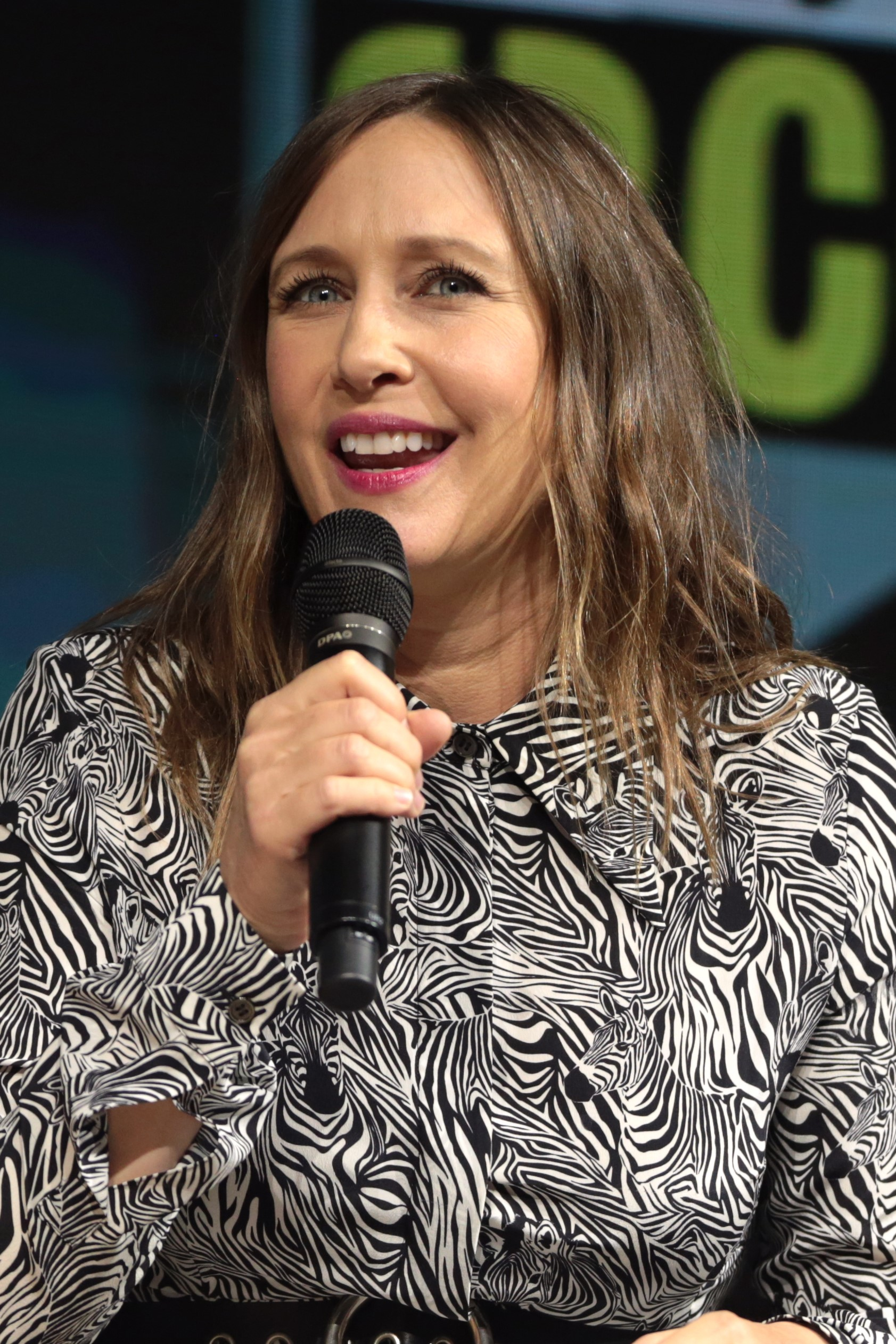
Vera Farmiga

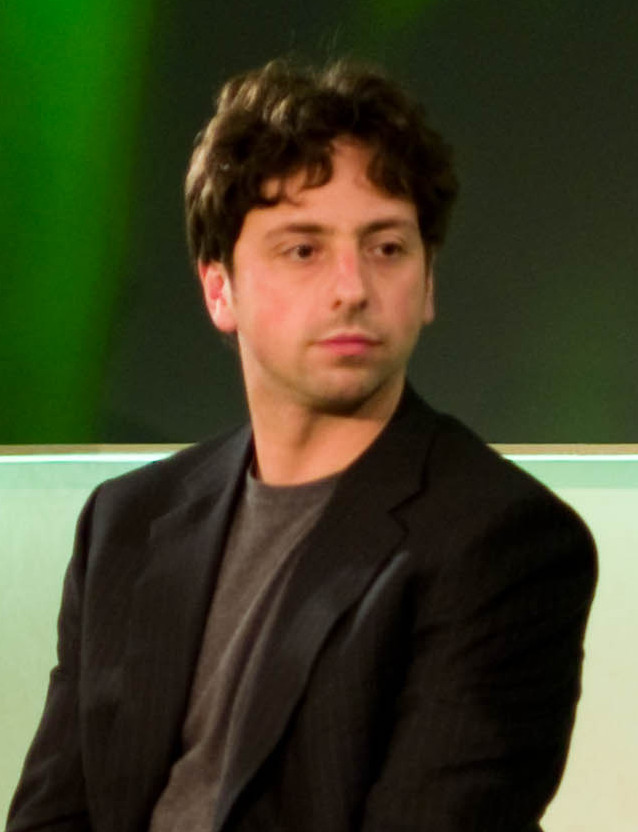
Sergey Brin

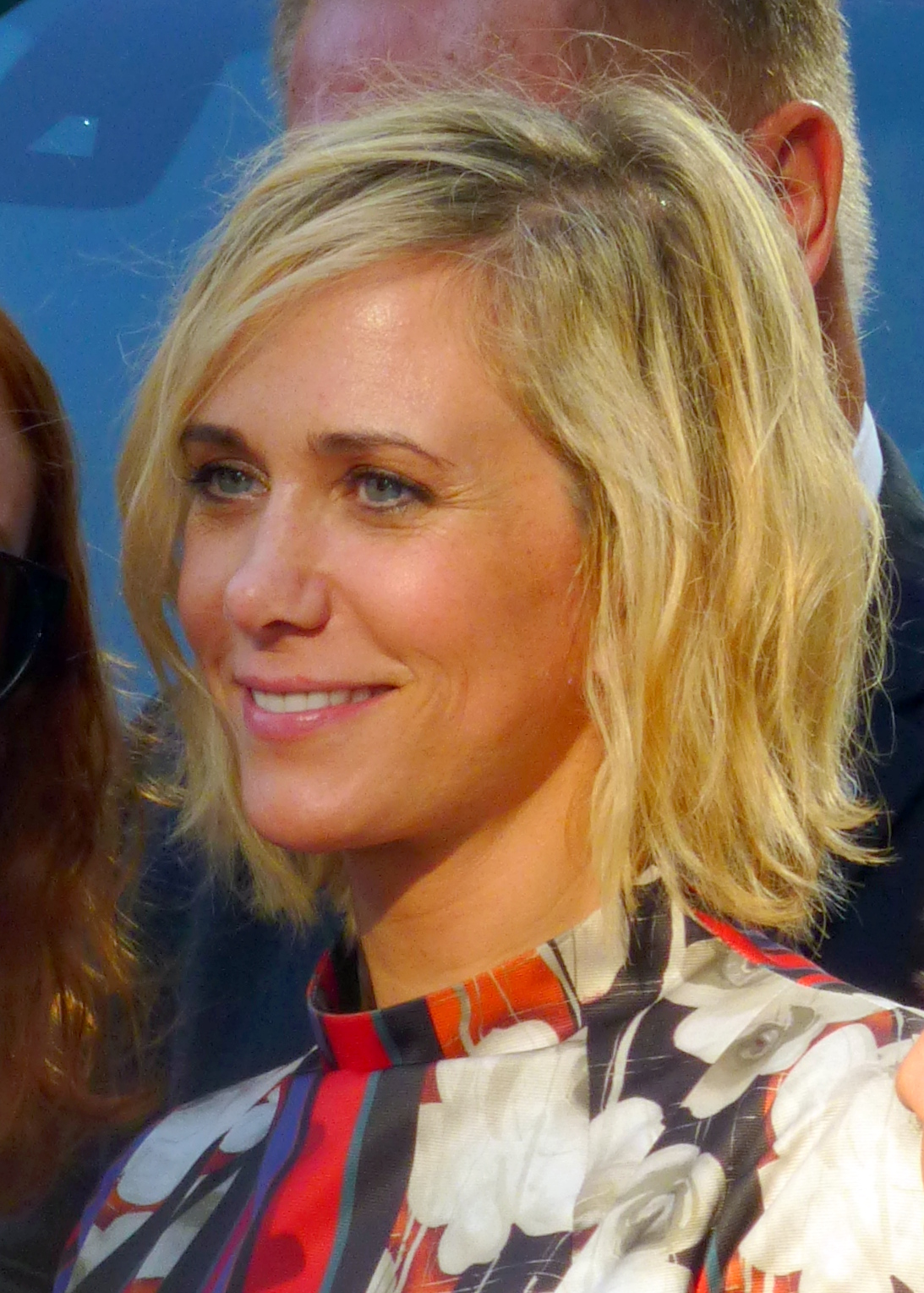
Kristen Wiig

- August 1 – Edurne Pasaban, Basque Spanish mountaineer
- August 2 – Susie O'Neill, Australian swimmer
- August 3 – Stephen Graham, English actor
- August 4 – Marcos, Brazilian footballer
- August 6
  - Asia Carrera, American actress
  - Vera Farmiga, American actress, director and producer
- August 7 – Zane Lowe, New Zealander DJ and radio host
- August 9
  - Kevin McKidd, Scottish actor
  - Filippo Inzaghi, Italian footballer
  - Oleksandr Ponomariov, Ukrainian singer
- August 10
  - Lisa Raymond, American tennis player
  - Javier Zanetti, Argentine football player
- August 14
  - Jared Borgetti, Mexican footballer
  - Jay-Jay Okocha, Nigerian footballer
  - Kieren Perkins, Australian swimmer
- August 19
  - Marco Materazzi, Italian football player
  - HRH Crown Princess Mette-Marit of Norway
- August 21
  - Sergey Brin, Russian-born American entrepreneur, co-founder of Google
  - Nikolai Valuev, Russian heavyweight boxing champion
- August 22
  - Howie D., American singer (Backstreet Boys)
  - Kristen Wiig, American actress, comedian and writer
- August 24
  - Dave Chappelle, African-American actor and comedian
  - Inge de Bruijn, Dutch swimmer
- August 31
  - Scott Niedermayer, Canadian ice hockey player
  - Mary Peltola, American politician, Senate candidate for Alaska

=== September ===
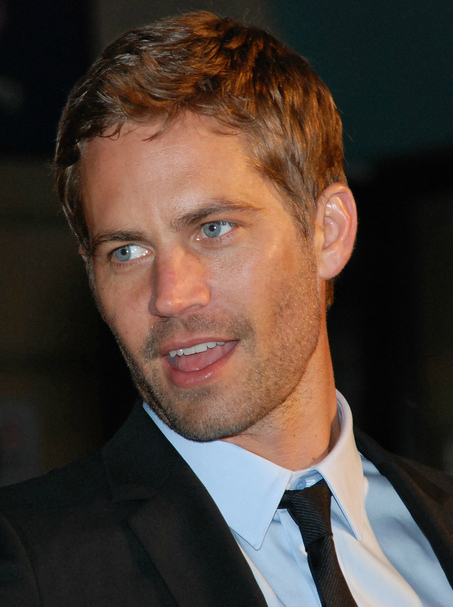
Paul Walker

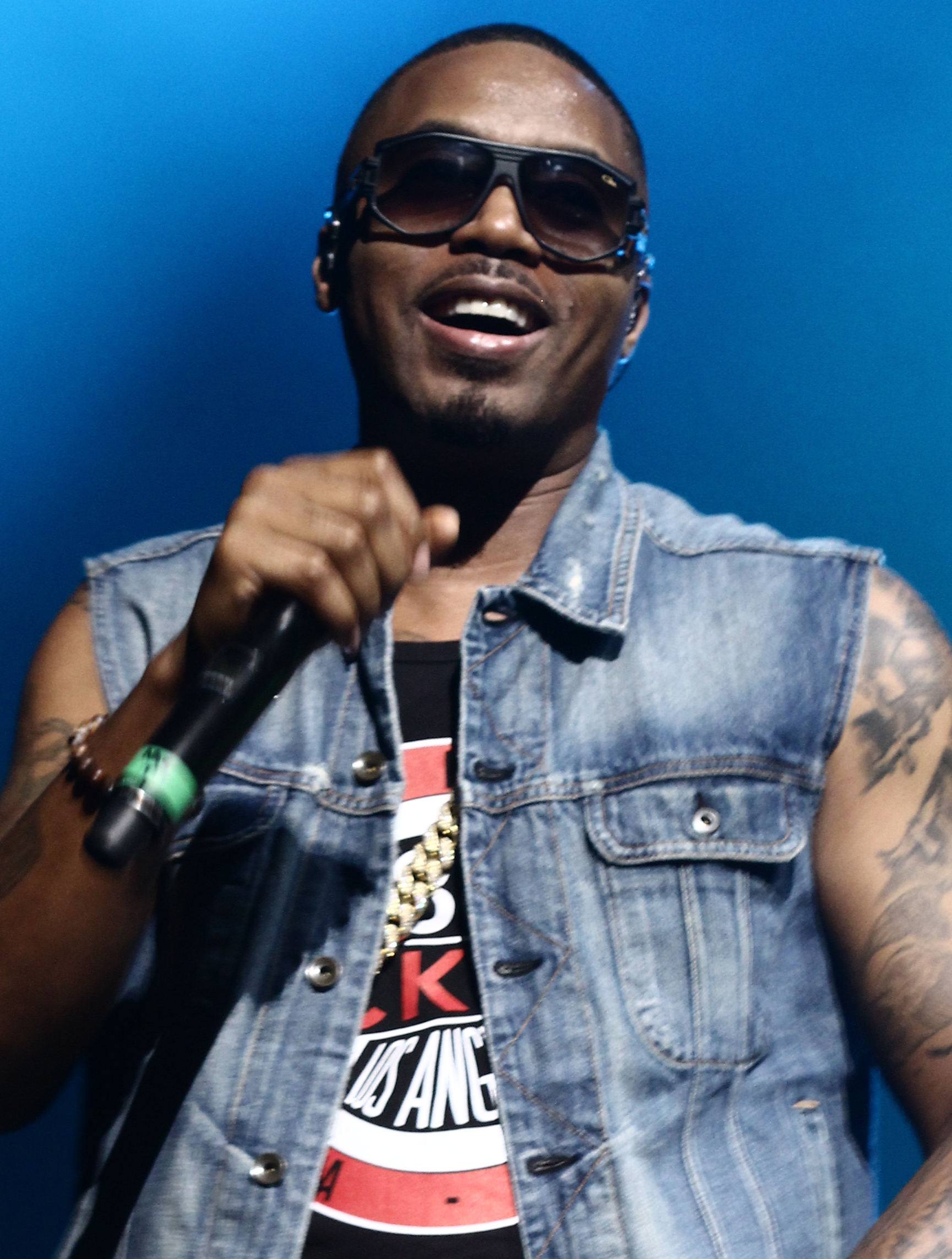
Nas

- September 1 – Ram Kapoor, Indian actor
- September 4 – Diosbelys Hurtado, Cuban boxer
- September 5
  - Rose McGowan, American actress
- September 6
  - Carlo Cudicini, Italian footballer
  - Greg Rusedski, Canadian-British tennis player
- September 7 – Shannon Elizabeth, American actress
- September 11 – Sohrab Bakhtiarizadeh, Iranian footballer
- September 12
  - Tarana Burke, American civil rights activist
  - Darren Campbell, British athlete
  - Paul Walker, American actor (d. 2013)
- September 13 – Fabio Cannavaro, Italian footballer
- September 14
  - Andrew Lincoln, English actor
  - Nas, African-American rapper
- September 15 – Prince Daniel, Duke of Västergötland, né Olof Daniel Westling, Swedish prince, married to Crown Princess Victoria
- September 18
  - James Marsden, American actor
  - Ami Onuki, Japanese singer
  - Mark Shuttleworth, South African entrepreneur
- September 19
  - José Azevedo, Portuguese cyclist
  - David Zepeda, Mexican actor, model and singer
- September 20 – Jo Pavey, English distance runner
- September 21
  - Driulis González, Cuban judoka
  - Virginia Ruano Pascual, Spanish tennis player
  - Oswaldo Sánchez, Mexican footballer
- September 25 – Bridgette Wilson, American actress
- September 29 – Alfie Boe, English tenor

=== October ===
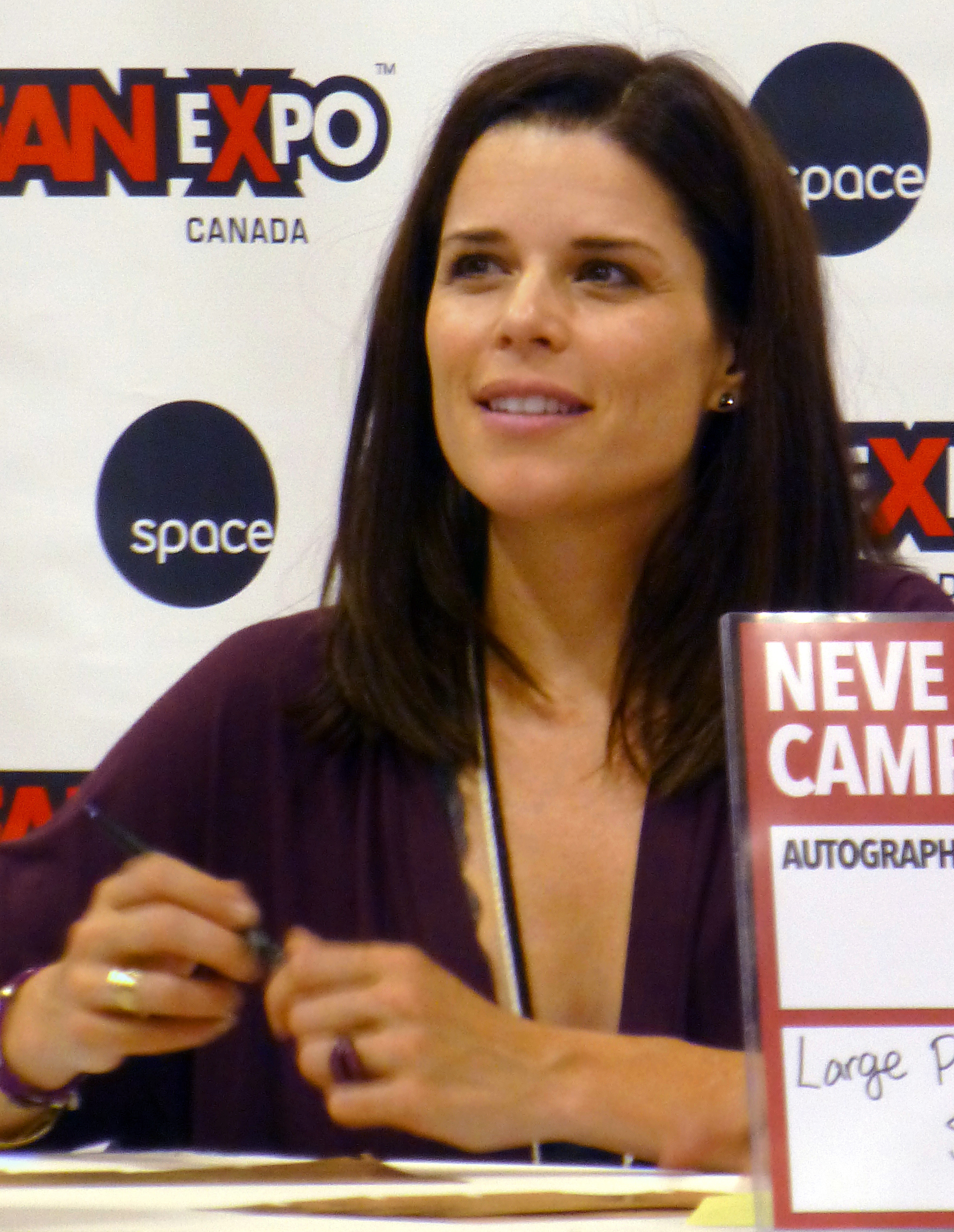
Neve Campbell

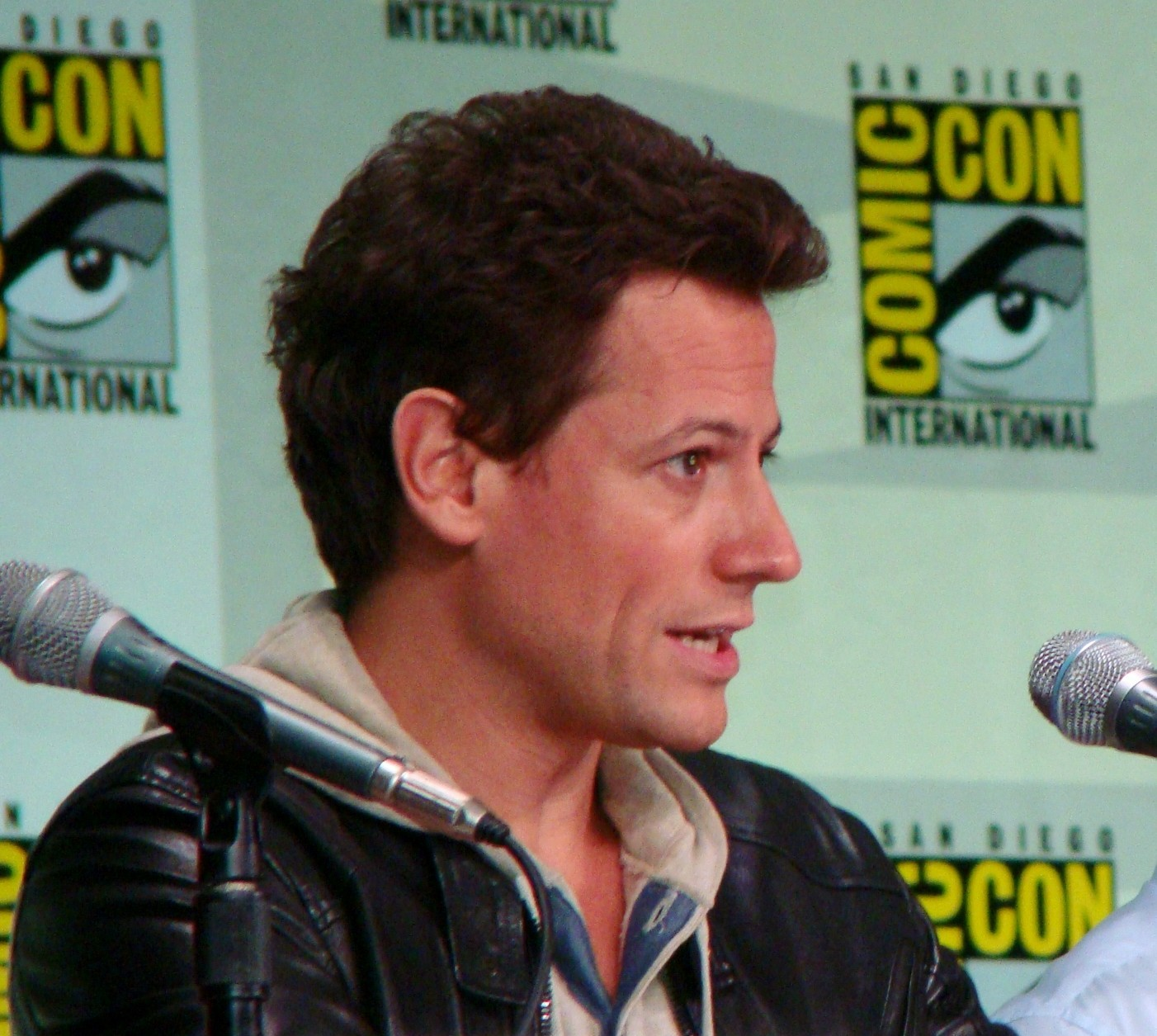
Ioan Gruffudd

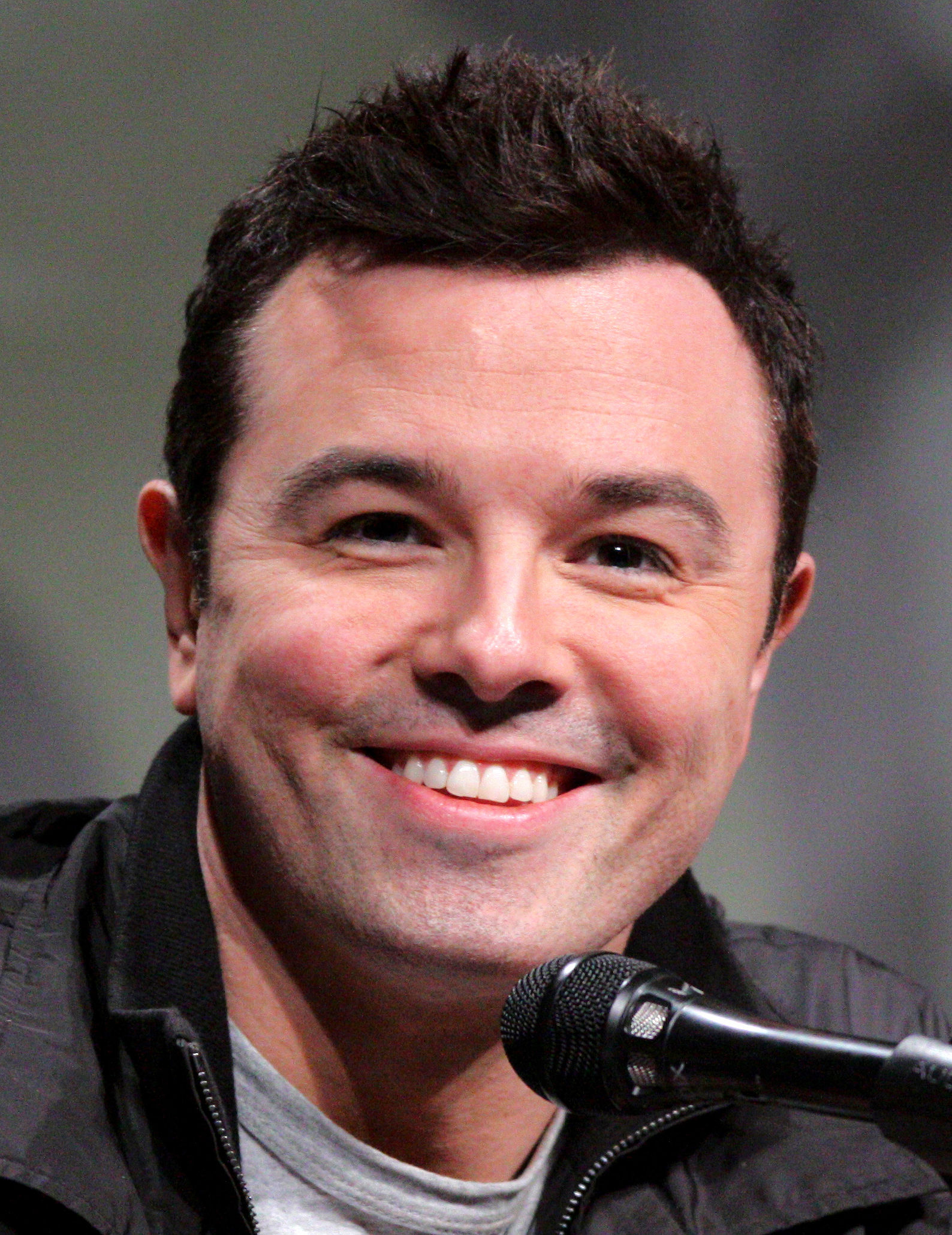
Seth MacFarlane

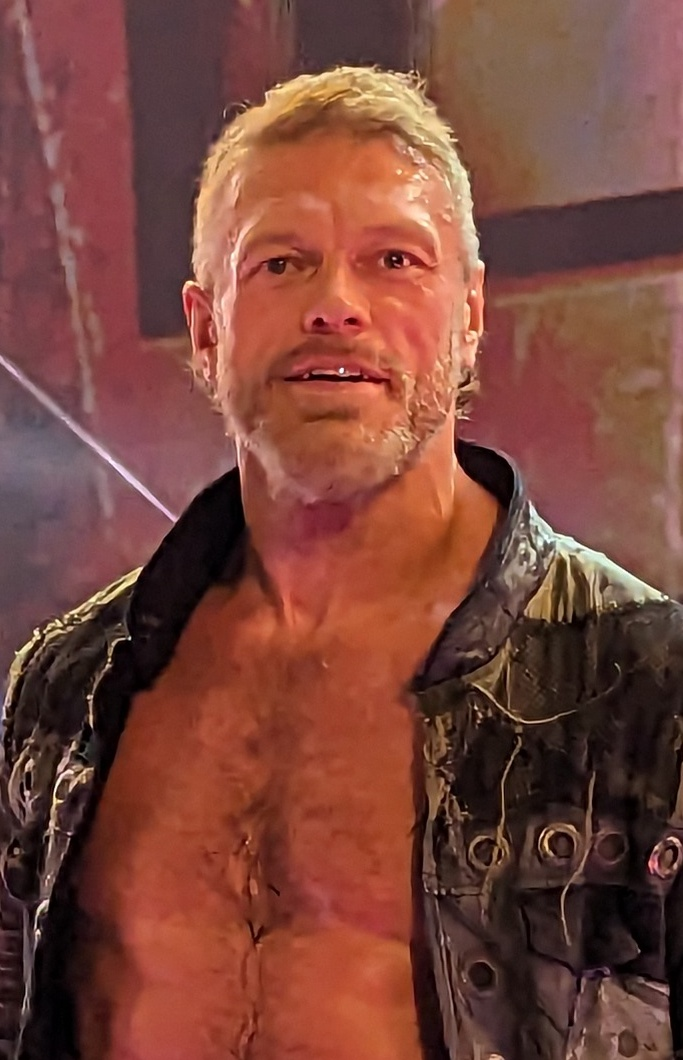
Edge

- October 2
  - Lene Nystrøm, Norwegian singer (Aqua)
  - Proof, American rapper (D12) (d. 2006)
  - Verka Serduchka, Ukrainian drag queen, comedian and singer, Eurovision Song Contest 2007 runner-up
- October 3 – Neve Campbell, Canadian actress
- October 4 – Chris Parks, American professional wrestler
- October 6
  - Ioan Gruffudd, Welsh actor
  - Rebecca Lobo, American basketball player
- October 7
  - Dida, Brazilian footballer
  - Sami Hyypiä, Finnish football player and coach
- October 10 – Mario Lopez, American actor
- October 13
  - Matt Hughes, American mixed martial arts fighter
  - Nanako Matsushima, Japanese actress
- October 14 – George Floyd, African-American victim of police brutality (d. 2020)
- October 15 – Susy Pryde, New Zealand cyclist
- October 17 – Deniz Uğur, Turkish actress
- October 18 – Sergey Bezrukov, Russian screen and stage actor
- October 21 – Lera Auerbach, Russian composer and pianist
- October 22 – Andrés Palop, Spanish football player and coach
- October 26 – Seth MacFarlane, American actor, screenwriter, producer, director and singer
- October 28
  - Maryam Nawaz, Pakistani politician
  - Montel Vontavious Porter, American professional wrestler
- October 29 – Robert Pires, French football player
- October 30 – Edge, Canadian professional wrestler

=== November ===
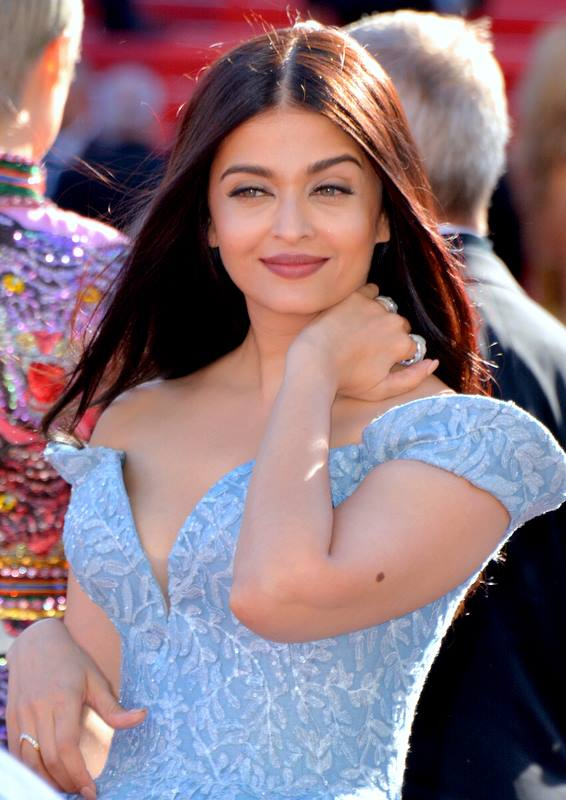
Aishwarya Rai

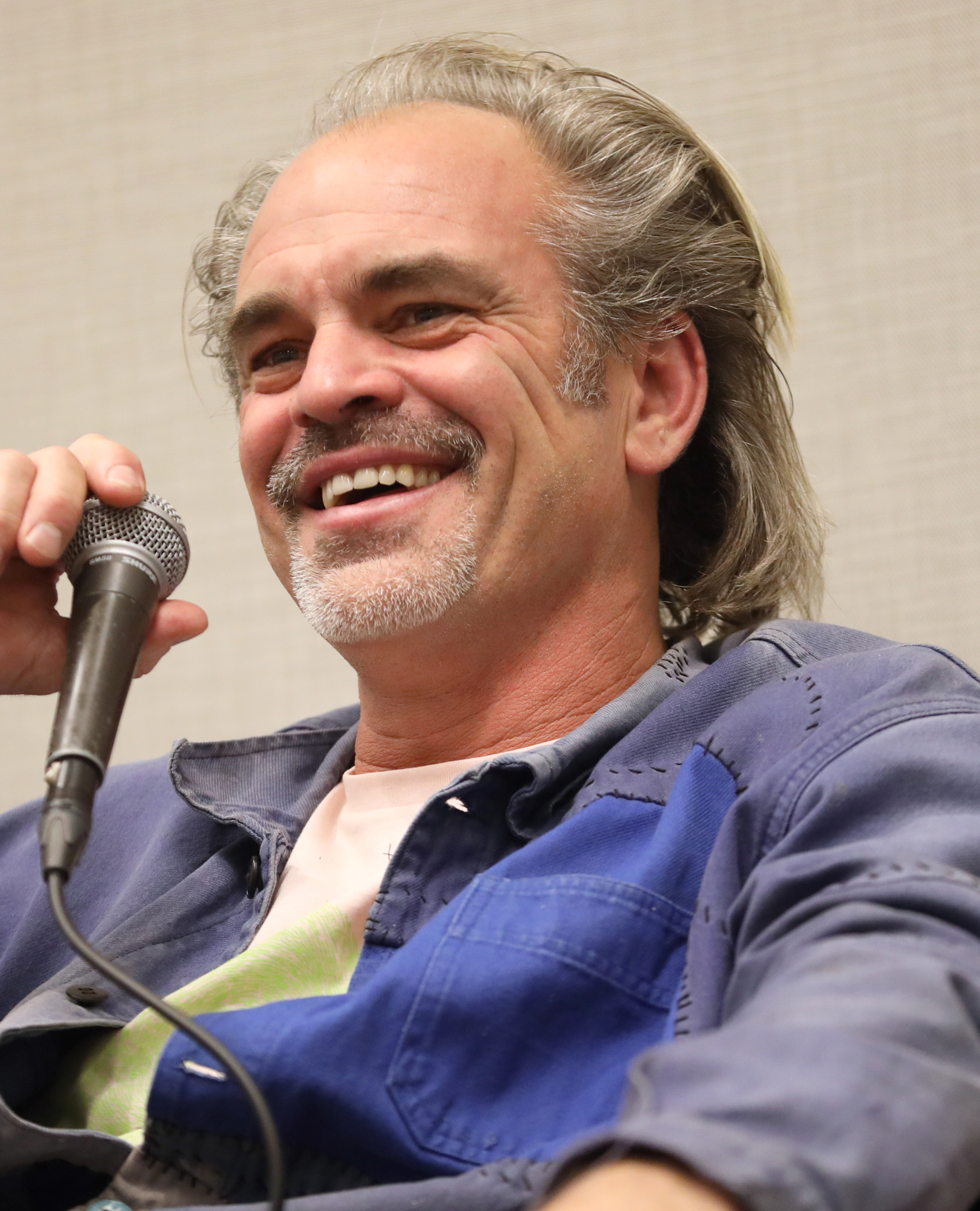
Steven Ogg

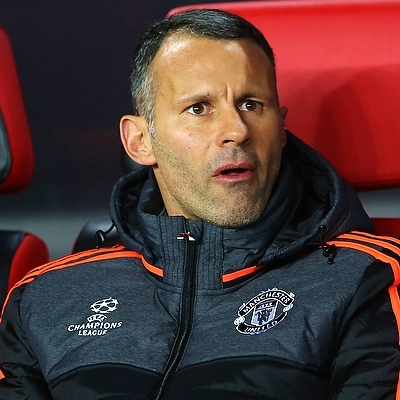
Ryan Giggs

- November 1
  - Assia, Algerian singer
  - Li Xiaoshuang, Chinese gymnast
  - Aishwarya Rai, Indian actress, Miss World 1994
- November 2 – Marisol Nichols, American actress
- November 3 – Mick Thomson, American guitarist
- November 4 – Steven Ogg, Canadian actor
- November 7
  - Yunjin Kim, South Korean-American film and theater actress
  - Martín Palermo, Argentine footballer
- November 9 – Nick Lachey, American actor, singer and television personality and host
- November 10 – Patrik Berger, Czech footballer
- November 17 – Alexei Urmanov, Russian figure skater
- November 26 – Peter Facinelli, American actor
- November 27 – Sharlto Copley, South African producer, actor and director
- November 29 – Ryan Giggs, Welsh footballer
- November 30
  - Nimród Antal, Hungarian-American film director, screenwriter and actor
  - Christian, Canadian professional wrestler
  - Im Chang-jung, South Korean actor

=== December ===
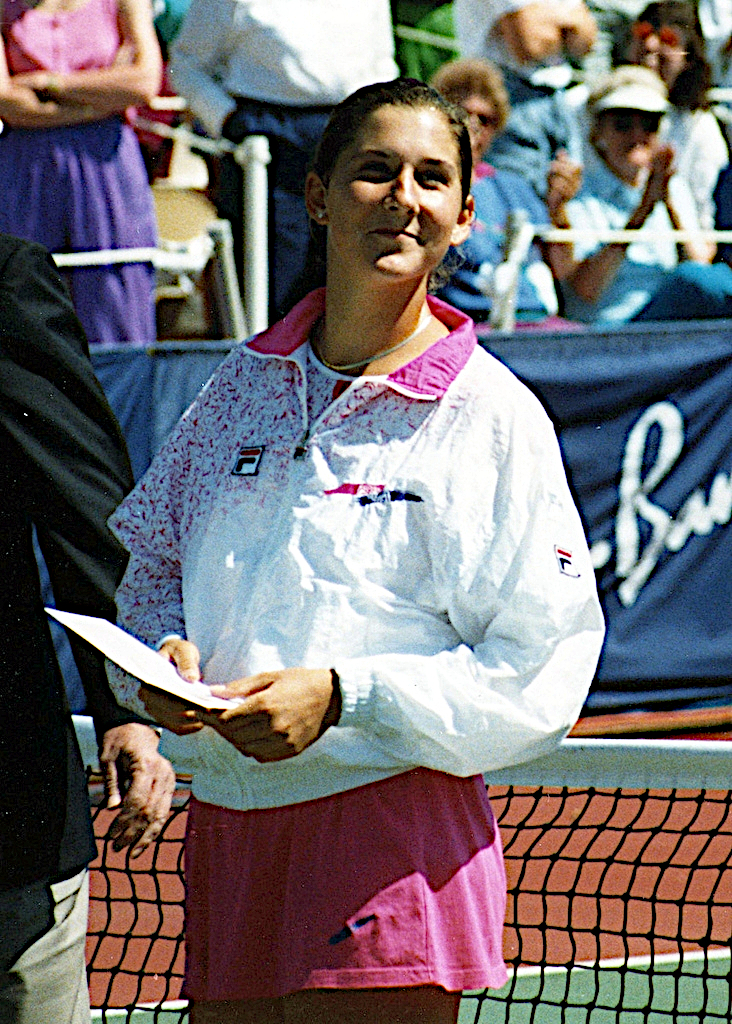
Monica Seles

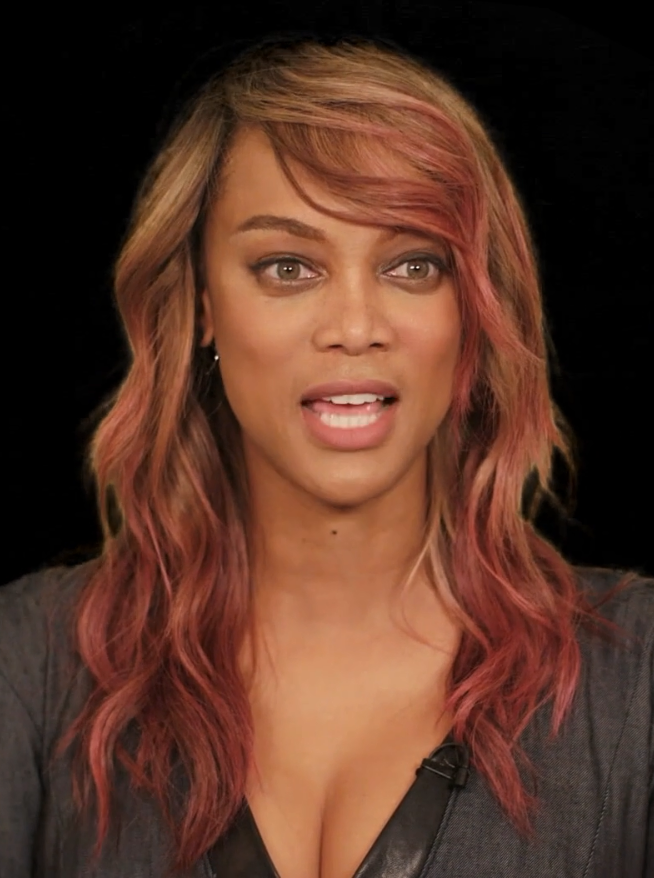
Tyra Banks

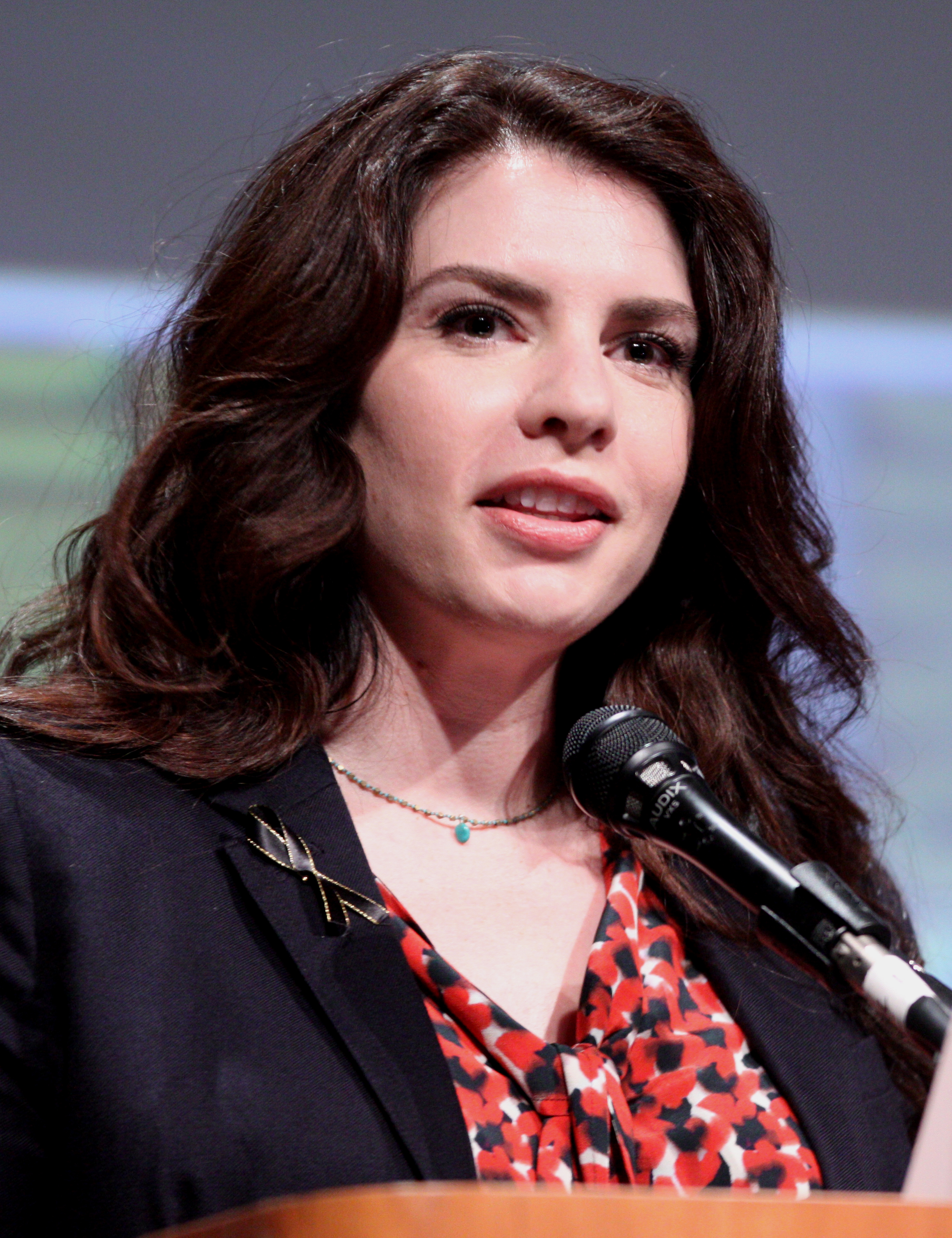
Stephenie Meyer

- December 2
  - Monica Seles, Hungarian-Yugoslavian tennis player
  - Jan Ullrich, German professional road bicycle racer
  - Grant Wahl, American sports journalist (d. 2022)
- December 3
  - Holly Marie Combs, American actress
  - Francisco Islas Rueda, Mexican professional wrestler
- December 4 – Tyra Banks, American supermodel, talk show host
- December 5
  - Arik Benado, Israeli footballer
  - Sorin Grindeanu, 65th Prime Minister of Romania
- December 7 – Damien Rice, Irish singer-songwriter, musician and record producer
- December 8
  - Gina Hinojosa, American politician, Governor-elect of Texas
  - Corey Taylor, American rock vocalist (Slipknot, Stone Sour)
- December 9 – Bárbara Padilla, American operatic soprano
- December 10 – Gabriela Spanic, Venezuelan-Mexican actress
- December 11 – Mos Def, African-American rapper and actor
- December 12 – Paz Lenchantin, Argentine-American musician
- December 14
  - Tomasz Radzinski, Canadian soccer player
  - Thuy Trang, Vietnamese-born actress (d. 2001)
- December 15 – Surya Bonaly, French figure skater
- December 17 – Paula Radcliffe, British athlete
- December 18 – Darryl Brown, Trinidad and West Indian cricketer
- December 27 – Wilson Cruz, American actor
- December 28
  - Seth Meyers, American actor and comedian
  - Ids Postma, Dutch speed skater
- December 30 – Ato Boldon, Trinidadian athlete
- December 31 – Nikolay Tsiskaridze, Russian dancer

== Deaths ==
=== January ===
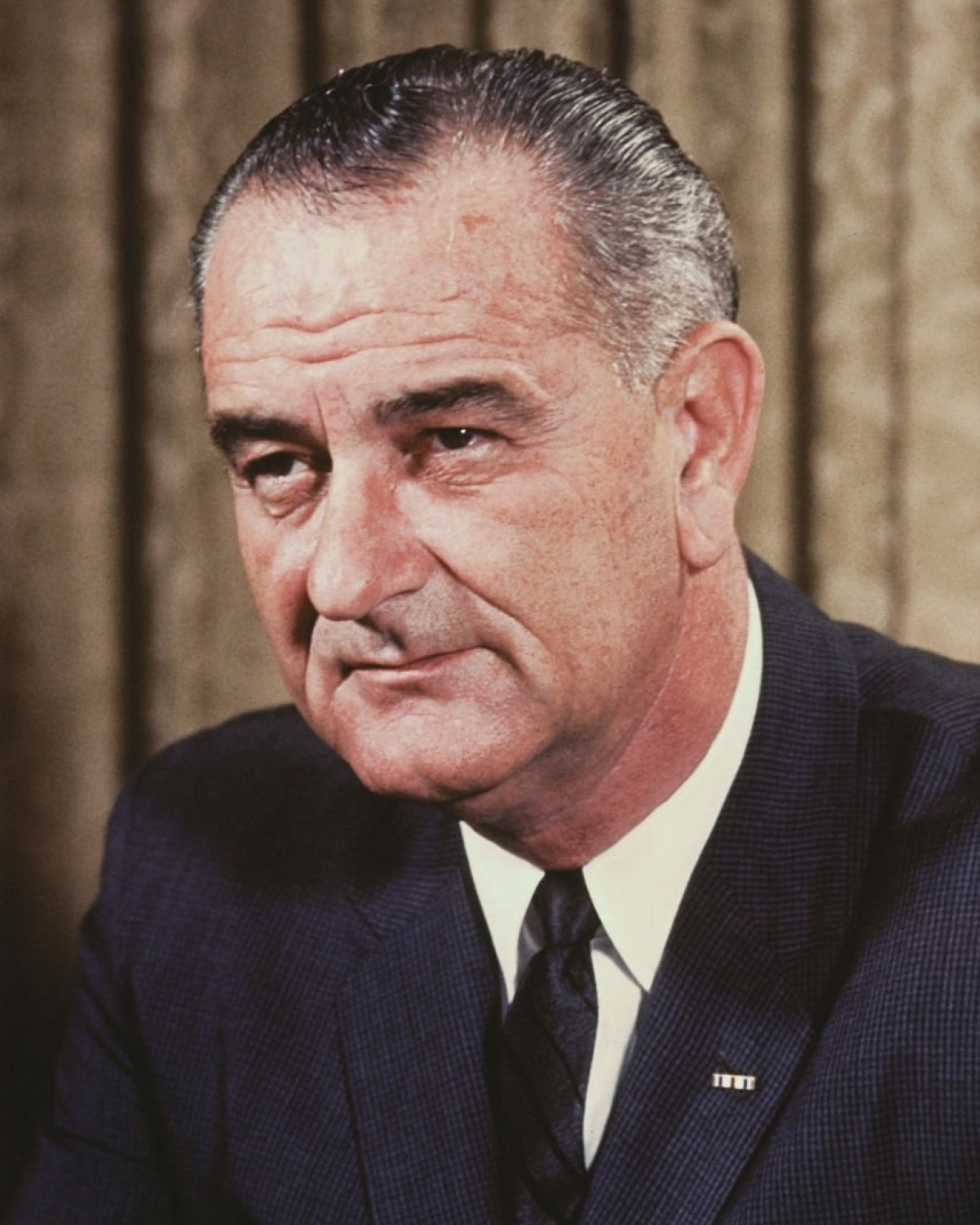
Lyndon B. Johnson

- January 2 – Eleazar López Contreras, 45th President of Venezuela (b. 1883)
- January 16 – Nellie Yu Roung Ling, Chinese dancer, lady-in-waiting to Qing Imperial Court (b. 1882)
- January 19
  - Max Adrian, Irish actor (b. 1903)
  - Jack Crawford, Canadian ice hockey player (b. 1916)
- January 22 – Lyndon B. Johnson, 36th President of the United States (b. 1908)
- January 23
  - Laura Negley, American politician, member of the Texas House of Representatives (b. 1890)
  - Kid Ory, American musician (b. 1886)
- January 24 – J. Carrol Naish, American actor (b. 1896)
- January 26 – Edward G. Robinson, American actor (b. 1893)
- January 28 – John Banner, Austrian-born American actor (b. 1910)
- January 30 – Jack MacGowran, Irish actor (b. 1918)
- January 31 – Ragnar Frisch, Norwegian economist, Nobel Prize laureate (b. 1895)

=== February ===
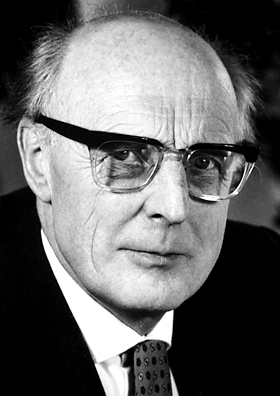
Hans D. Jensen

- February 11 – J. Hans D. Jensen, German physicist, Nobel Prize laureate (b. 1907)
- February 15 – Wally Cox, American actor (b. 1924)
- February 16 – Francisco Caamaño, 50th President of the Dominican Republic (executed) (b. 1932)
- February 19 – Joseph Szigeti, Hungarian violinist (b. 1892)
- February 22
  - Elizabeth Bowen, Irish novelist (b. 1899)
  - Katina Paxinou, Greek actress (b. 1900)
  - Winthrop Rockefeller, American politician and philanthropist (b. 1912)
- February 23 – Dickinson W. Richards, American physician, recipient of the Nobel Prize in Physiology or Medicine (b. 1895)
- February 28 – Cecil Kellaway, South African actor (b. 1890)

=== March ===
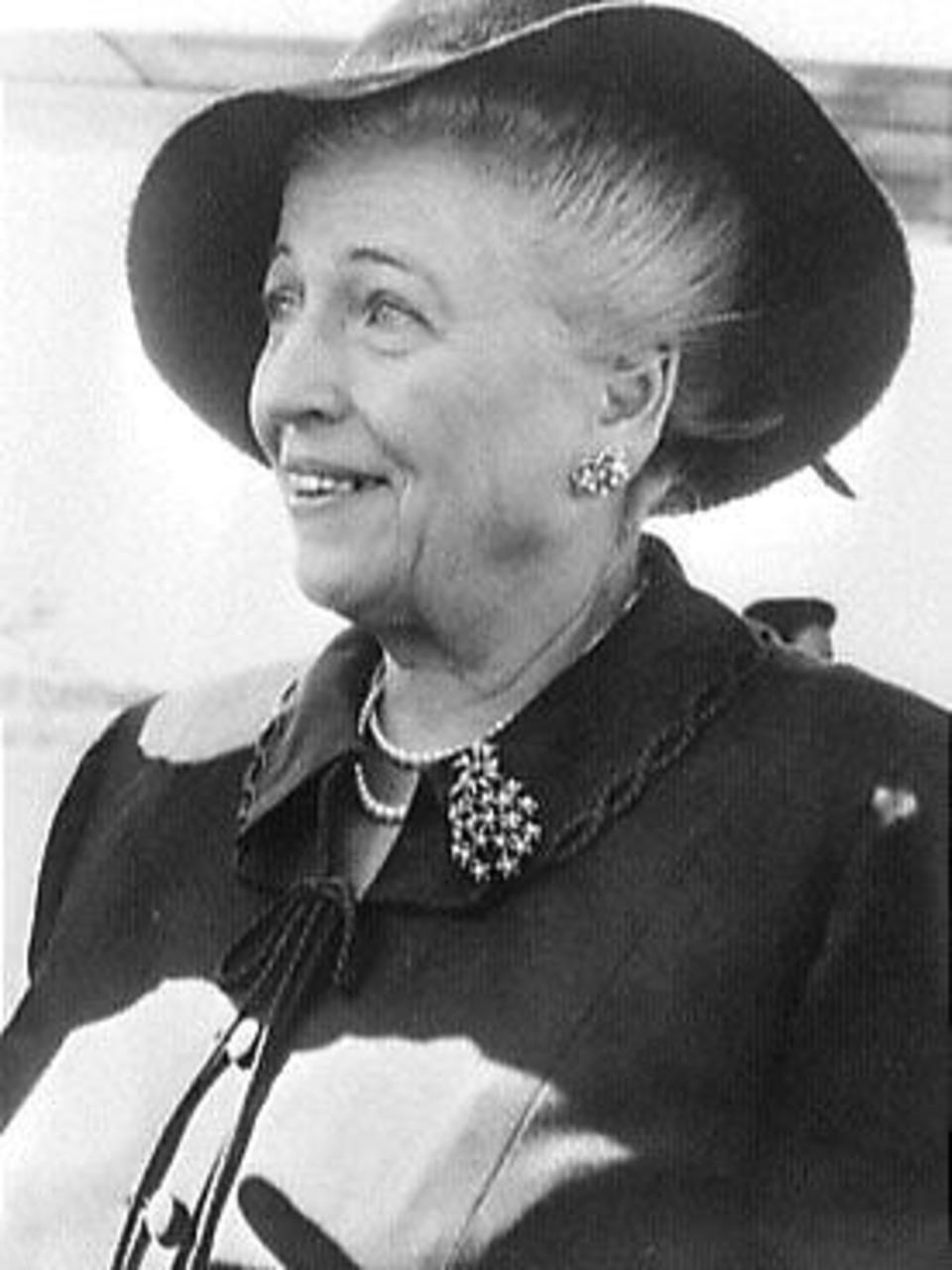
Pearl S. Buck

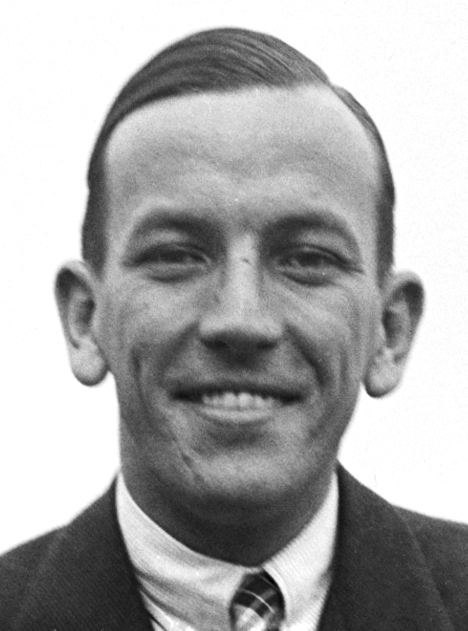
Sir Noël Coward

- March 3 – Vera Panova, Soviet-Russian writer (b. 1905)
- March 6 – Pearl S. Buck, American writer, Nobel Prize laureate (b. 1892)
- March 8 – Benjamín de Arriba y Castro, Spanish Roman Catholic archbishop and cardinal (b. 1886)
- March 10
  - Bull Connor, American politician, civil rights opponent (b. 1897)
  - Sir Richard Sharples, British politician, Governor of Bermuda (b. 1916) (assassinated)
  - Robert Siodmak, German-born American film director (b. 1900)
- March 14 – Howard H. Aiken, American computing pioneer (b. 1900)
- March 18
  - Johannes Aavik, Estonian philologist (b. 1880)
  - Lauritz Melchior, Danish opera singer (b. 1890)
- March 21 – Âşık Veysel, Turkish poet, songwriter and saz player (b. 1894)
- March 22 – Hilda Geiringer, Austrian mathematician (b. 1893)
- March 23 – Ken Maynard, American actor (b. 1895)
- March 25 – Edward Steichen, Luxembourg-born American photographer (b. 1879)
- March 26 – Sir Noël Coward, English composer and playwright (b. 1899)
- March 30 – Douglas Douglas-Hamilton, 14th Duke of Hamilton, Scottish nobleman and aviation pioneer (b. 1903)

=== April ===
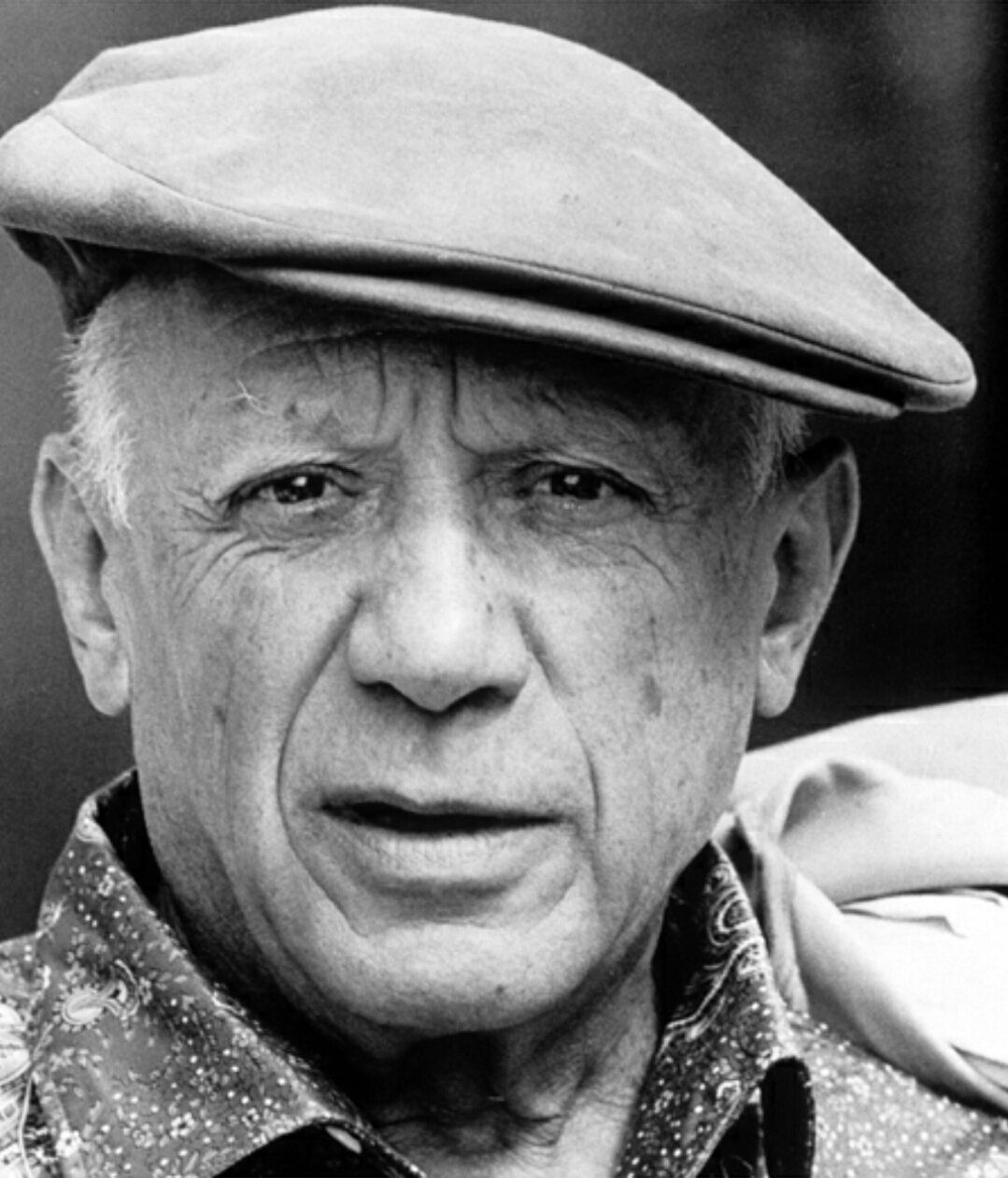
Pablo Picasso

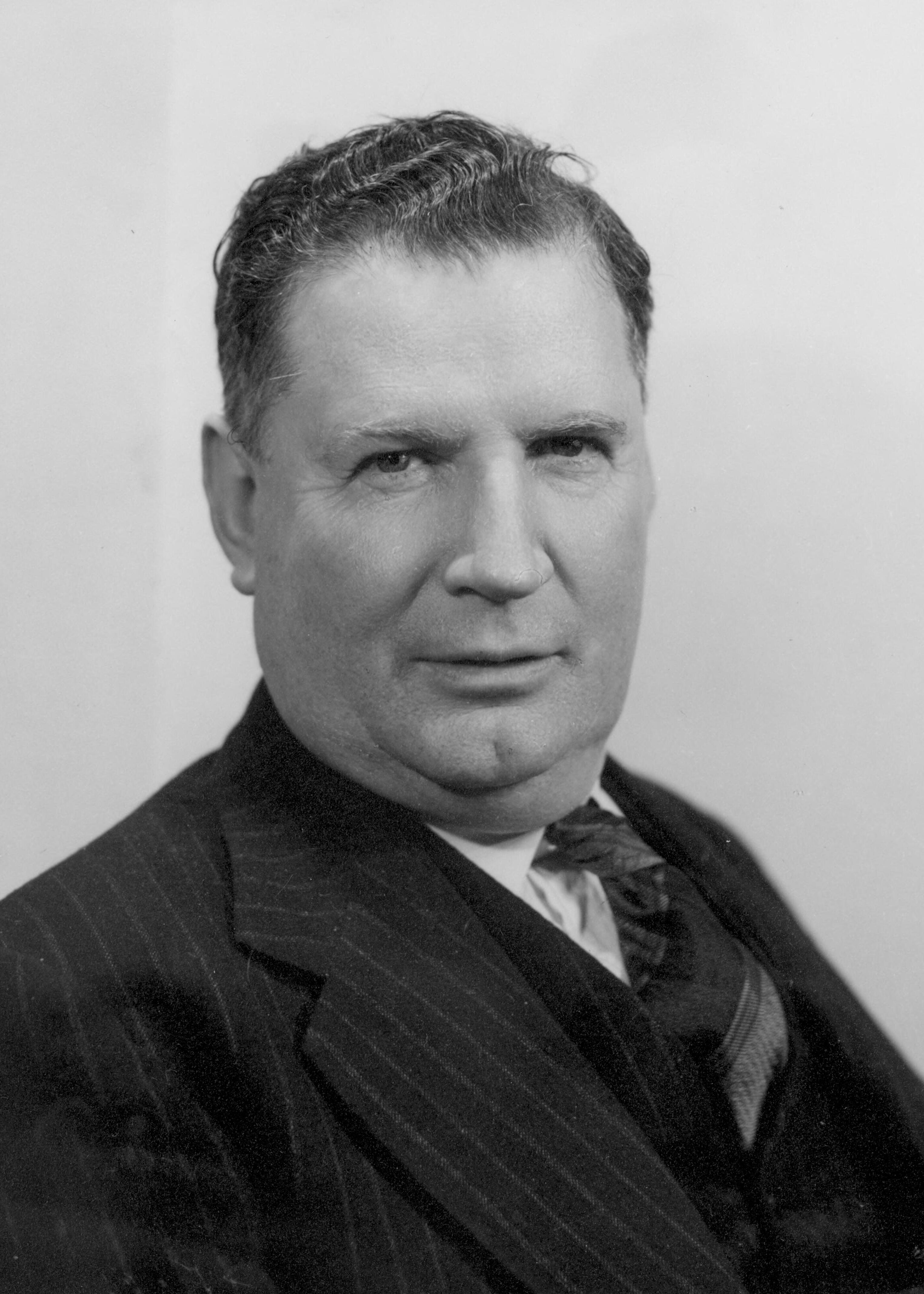
Sir Arthur Fadden

- April 8 – Pablo Picasso, Spanish artist (b. 1881)
- April 12 – Arthur Freed, American film producer (b. 1894)
- April 13
  - Henry Darger, American outsider artist and writer (b. 1892)
  - Dudley Senanayake, 2nd Prime Minister of Sri Lanka (b. 1911)
- April 14 – Károly Kerényi, Hungarian philologist and mythologist (b. 1897)
- April 16
  - Nino Bravo, Spanish singer (b. 1944)
  - Istvan Kertesz, Hungarian conductor (b. 1929)
- April 19 – Hans Kelsen, Austrian-born legal theorist (b. 1881)
- April 21
  - Merian C. Cooper, American aviator, director and producer (b. 1893)
  - Sir Arthur Fadden, Australian politician, 13th Prime Minister of Australia (b. 1894)
- April 25 – Fouad Chehab, 8th President of Lebanon (b. 1902)
- April 26 – Irene Ryan, American actress (b. 1902)
- April 28 – Jacques Maritain, French Catholic philosopher (b. 1882)

=== May ===
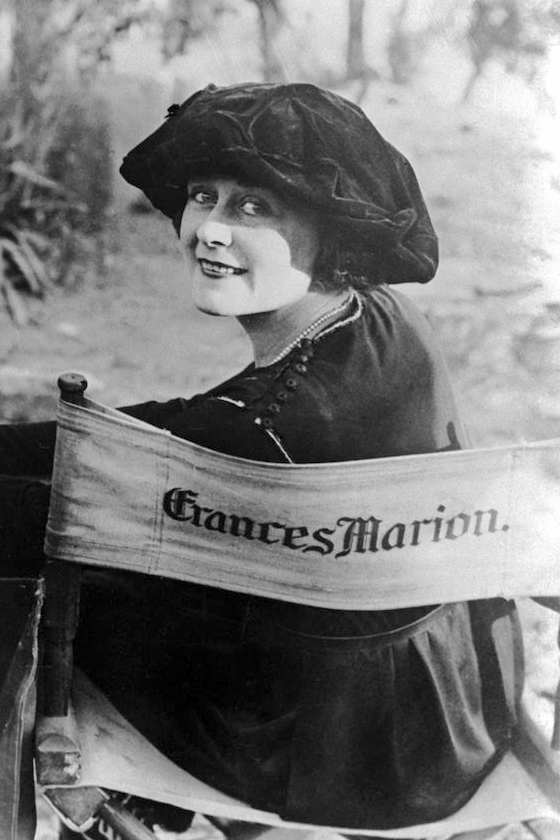
Frances Marion

- May 1 – Asger Jorn, Danish painter (b. 1914)
- May 8 – Alexander Vandegrift, American general (b. 1887)
- May 11 – Lex Barker, American actor (b. 1919)
- May 12 – Frances Marion, American screenwriter (b. 1888)
- May 16 – Jacques Lipchitz, French-American sculptor (b. 1891)
- May 18 – Jeannette Rankin, American politician (b. 1880)
- May 20 – Jarno Saarinen, Finnish motorcycle racer (b. 1945)
- May 21 – Ivan Konev, Marshal of the Soviet Union (b. 1897)
- May 26 – Karl Löwith, German philosopher (b. 1897)
- May 27 – Constantin Daicoviciu, Romanian historian and archaeologist (b. 1898)

=== June ===
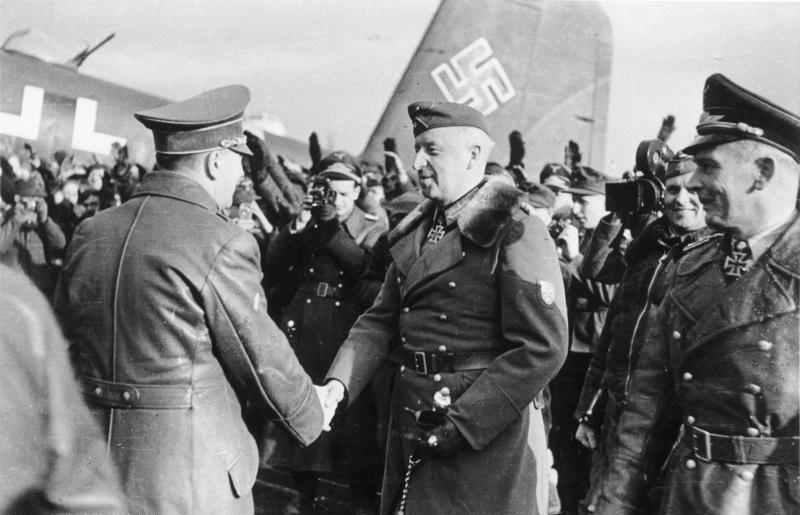
Erich von Manstein

- June 8 – Emmy Göring, German actress, second wife of Hermann Göring (b. 1893)
- June 10
  - Erich von Manstein, German field marshal (b. 1887)
  - William Inge, American playwright (b. 1913)
- June 29 – Germán Valdés, Mexican actor, singer and comedian (b. 1915)
- June 30 – Nancy Mitford, English novelist (b. 1904)

=== July ===
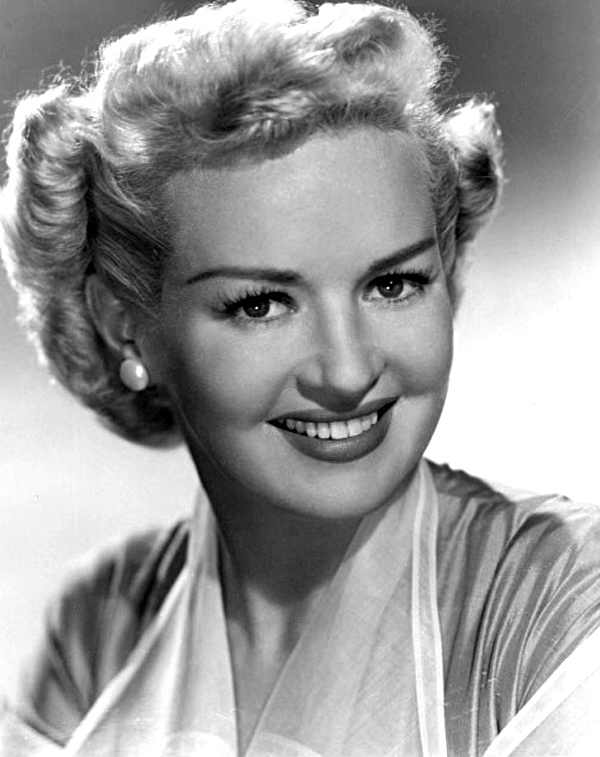
Betty Grable

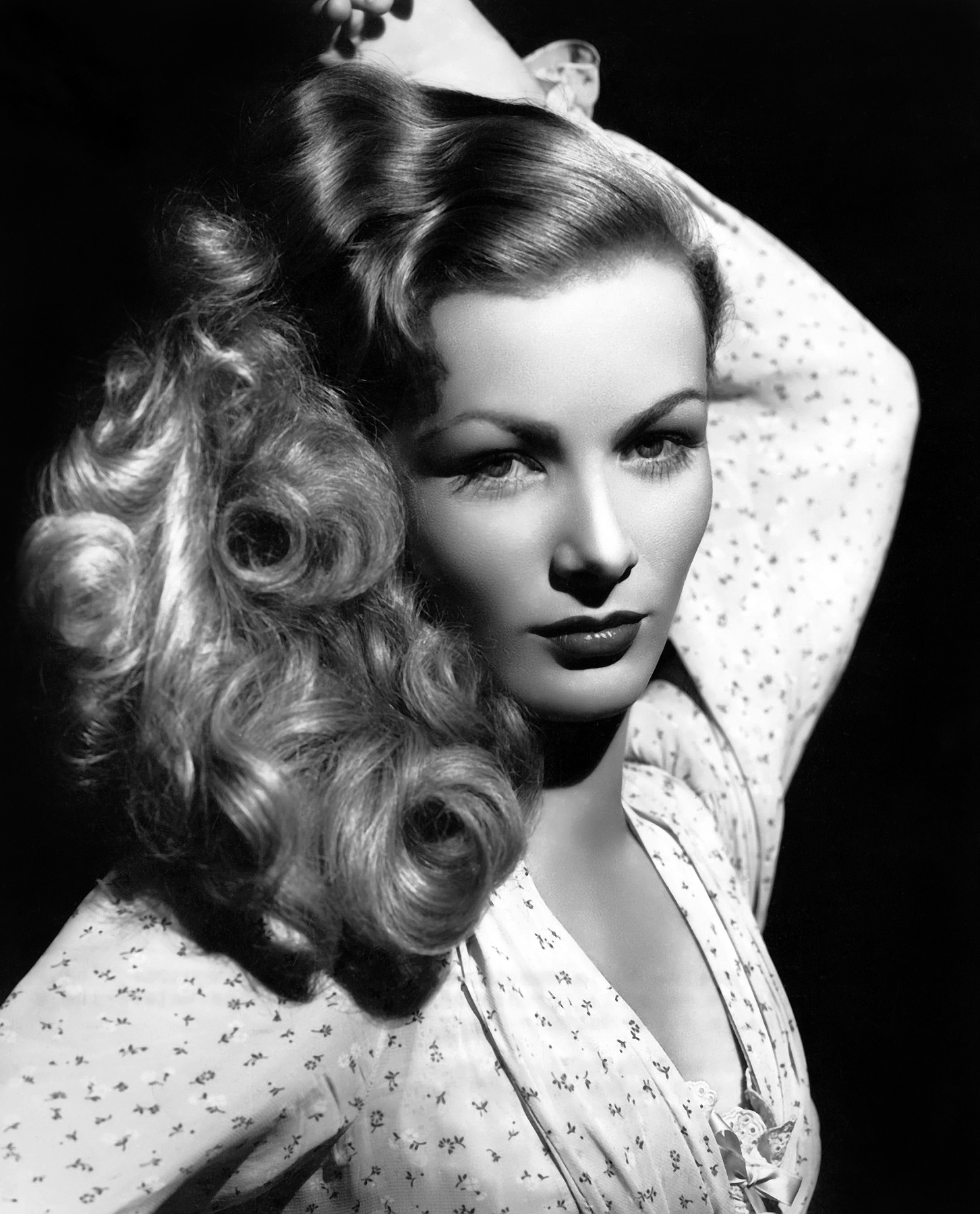
Veronica Lake

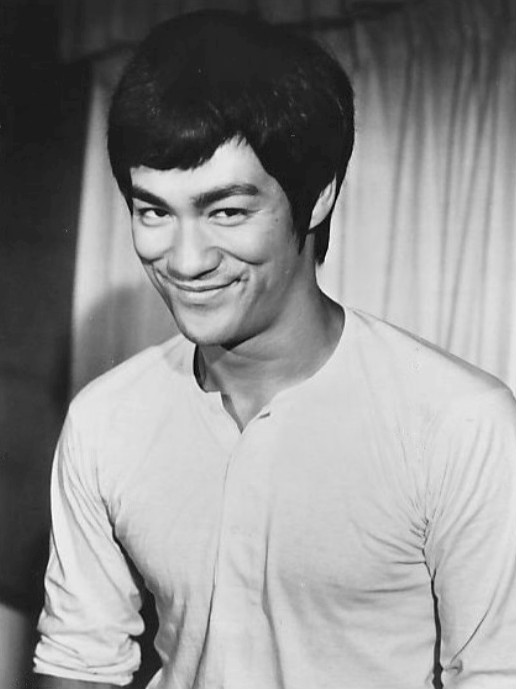
Bruce Lee

- July 2 – Betty Grable, American actress (b. 1916)
- July 3 – Karel Ančerl, Czechoslovak conductor (b. 1908)
- July 6
  - Joe E. Brown, American actor and comedian (b. 1891)
  - Otto Klemperer, German conductor (b. 1885)
- July 7
  - Max Horkheimer, German philosopher and sociologist (b. 1895)
  - Veronica Lake, American actress (b. 1922)
- July 8
  - Arthur Calwell, Australian politician (b. 1896)
  - Ben-Zion Dinur, Russian-born Israeli educator, historian and politician (b. 1884)
  - Wilfred Rhodes, English cricketer (b. 1877)
- July 11
  - Alexander Mosolov, Russian composer (b. 1900)
  - Robert Ryan, American actor (b. 1909)
- July 12 – Lon Chaney Jr., American actor (b. 1906)
- July 13 – Willy Fritsch, German actor (b. 1901)
- July 18 – Jack Hawkins, English actor (b. 1910)
- July 20
  - Mikhail Isakovsky, Russian poet (b. 1900)
  - Bruce Lee, Chinese-American martial artist and actor (b. 1940)
  - Robert Smithson, American artist (b. 1938)
- July 23 – Eddie Rickenbacker, American World War I flying ace and race car driver (b. 1890)
- July 24 – Julián Acuña Galé, Cuban botanist (b. 1900)
- July 25
  - Dezső Pattantyús-Ábrahám, Prime Minister of Hungary (b. 1875)
  - Louis St. Laurent, 12th Prime Minister of Canada (b. 1882)
- July 26 – Konstantinos Georgakopoulos, Greek lawyer and professor, 152nd Prime Minister of Greece (b. 1890)
- July 29
  - Henri Charrière, French writer (b. 1906)
  - Julio Adalberto Rivera Carballo, 34th President of El Salvador (b. 1921)
- July 31 – Annibale Bergonzoli, Italian general (b. 1884)

=== August ===
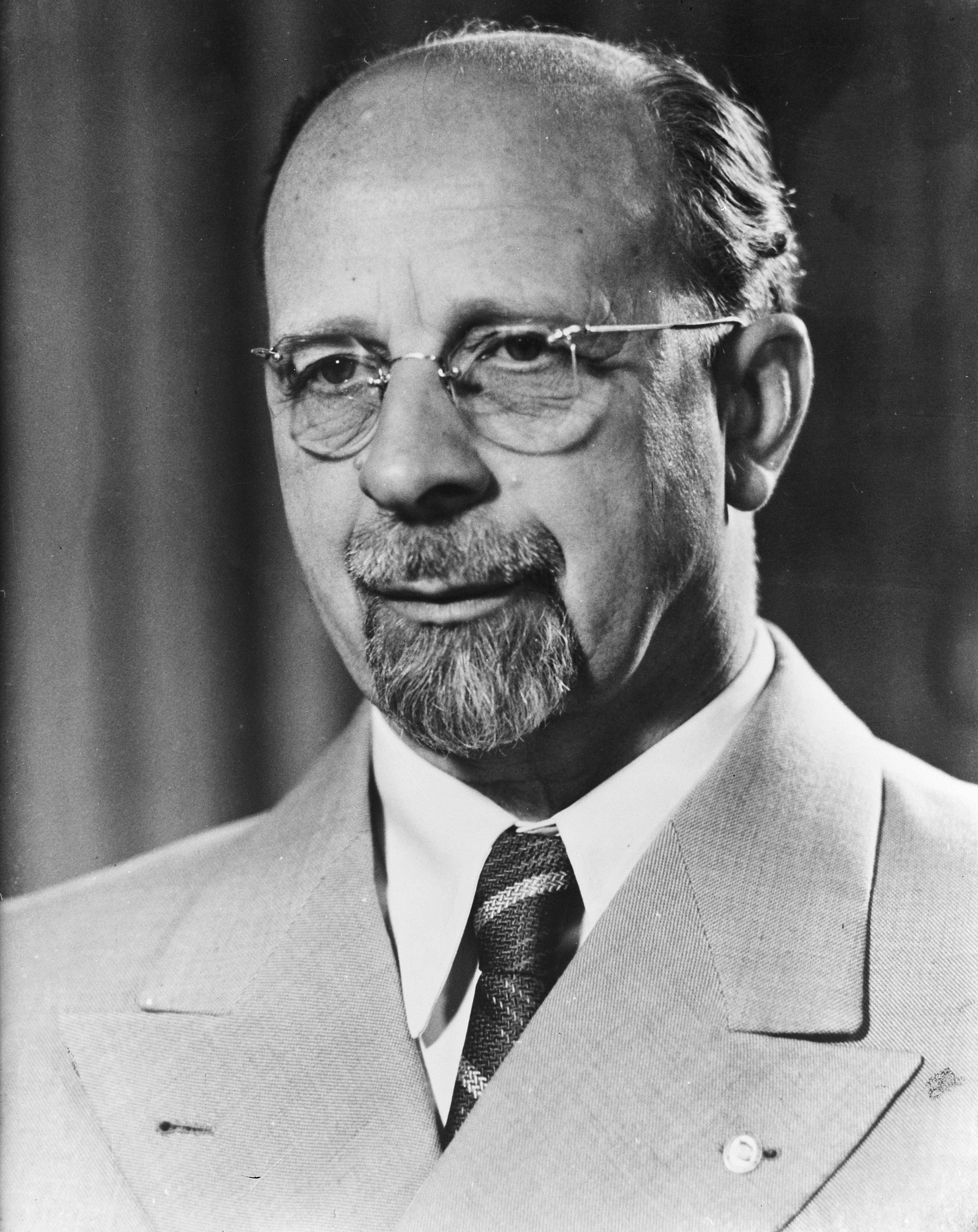
Walter Ulbricht

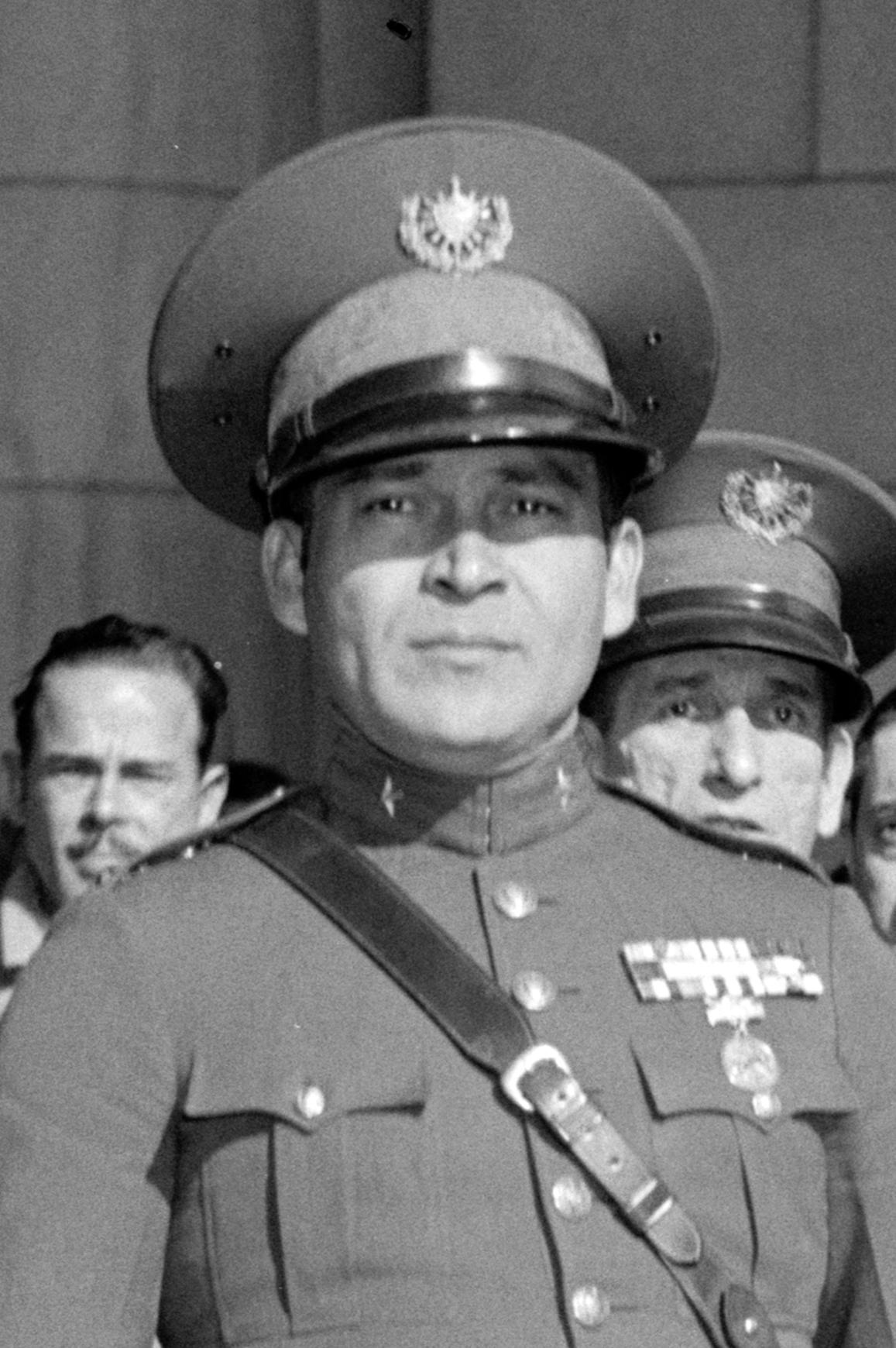
Fulgencio Batista

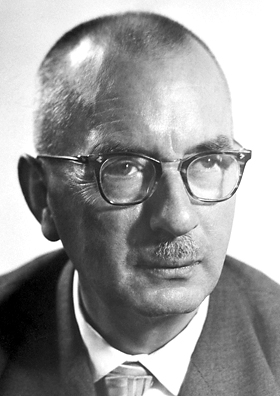
Karl Ziegler

- August 1
  - Gian Francesco Malipiero, Italian composer (b. 1882)
  - Walter Ulbricht, East German politician, leader of the Communist Party and 2nd head of State of the GDR (b. 1893)
  - Nikos Zachariadis, Greek politician, leader of the Communist Party of Greece (b. 1903)
- August 2
  - Jean-Pierre Melville, French film director (b. 1917)
  - Ismail Abdul Rahman, Malaysian politician (b. 1915)
- August 6 – Fulgencio Batista, 9th and 12th President of Cuba (b. 1901)
- August 8 – Vilhelm Moberg, Swedish novelist and historian (b. 1898)
- August 9 – Charles Daniels, American Olympic swimmer (b. 1885)
- August 12
  - Walter Rudolf Hess, Swiss physiologist, Nobel Prize laureate (b. 1881)
  - Karl Ziegler, German chemist, Nobel Prize laureate (b. 1898)
- August 16 – Selman Waksman, Ukrainian-born American biochemist, recipient of the Nobel Prize in Physiology or Medicine (b. 1888)
- August 17
  - Conrad Aiken, American writer (b. 1889)
  - Jean Barraqué, French composer (b. 1928)
  - Paul Williams, American singer (The Temptations) (b. 1939)
- August 18
  - François Bonlieu, French Olympic alpine skier (b. 1937)
  - Basil Brooke, 1st Viscount Brookeborough, British politician, 3rd Prime Minister of Northern Ireland (b. 1888)
- August 31 – John Ford, American film director (b. 1894)

=== September ===
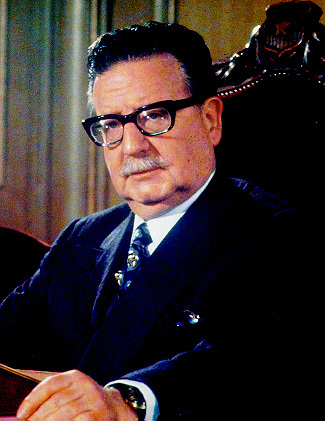
Salvador Allende

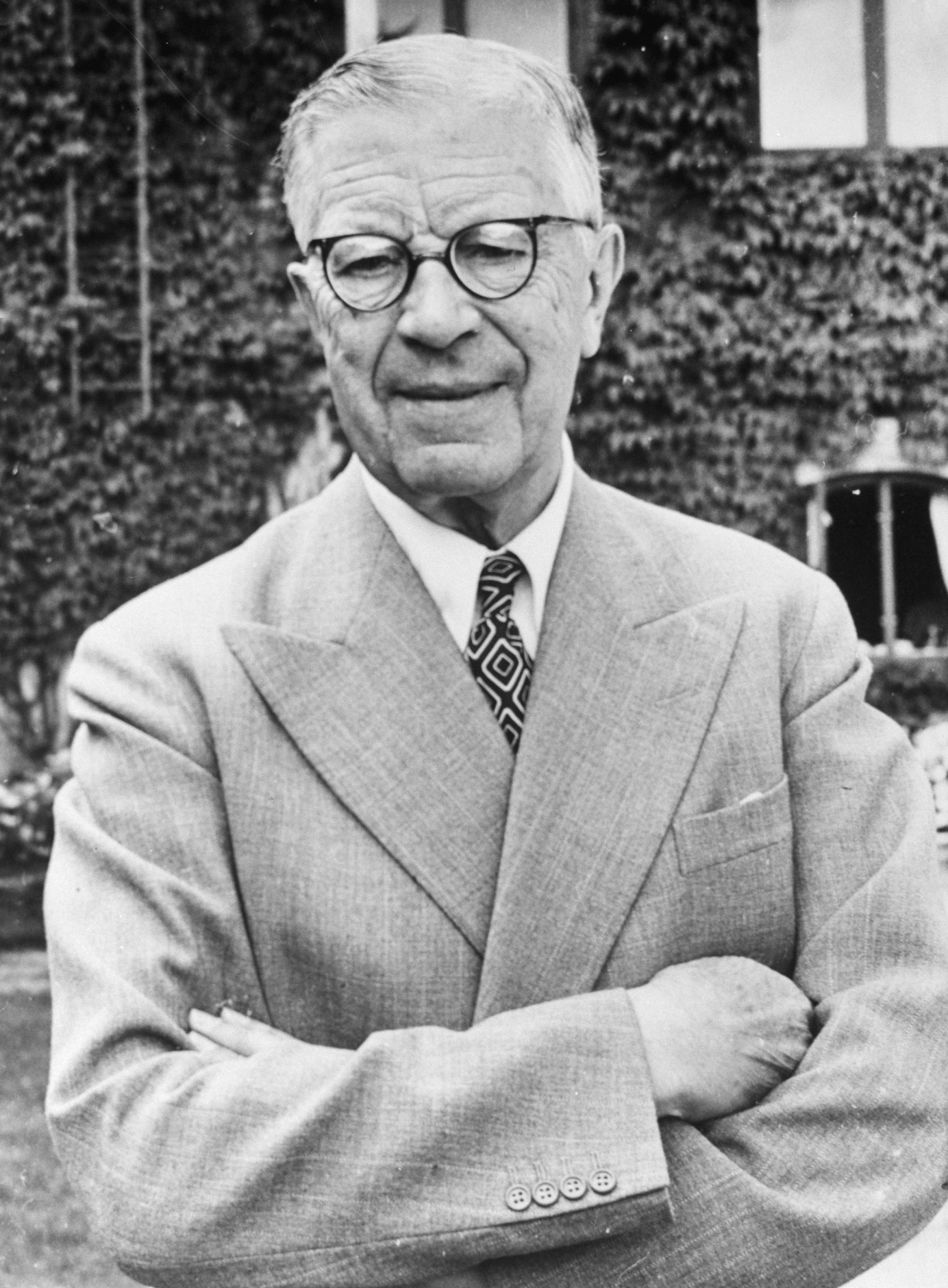
King Gustaf VI Adolf of Sweden

- September 2 – J. R. R. Tolkien, British writer (b. 1892)
- September 11 – Salvador Allende, 30th President of Chile (b. 1908)
- September 12 – Marjorie Merriweather Post, American businesswoman (b. 1887)
- September 13 – Betty Field, American actress (b. 1916)
- September 15 – King Gustaf VI Adolf of Sweden (b. 1882)
- September 16
  - Rafael Franco, 33rd President of Paraguay (b. 1896)
  - Víctor Jara, Chilean political activist and singer-songwriter (b. 1932)
  - Al Sherman, American Tin Pan Alley songwriter (b. 1897)
- September 18 – Théo Lefèvre, 39th Prime Minister of Belgium (b. 1914)
- September 19 – Gram Parsons, American musician (b. 1946)
- September 20
  - Jim Croce, American songwriter (b. 1943)
  - Glenn Strange, American actor (b. 1899)
- September 22 – Paul van Zeeland, 29th Prime Minister of Belgium (b. 1893)
- September 23 – Pablo Neruda, Chilean poet, Nobel Prize laureate (b. 1904)
- September 24 – Josué de Castro, Brazilian writer, physician, geographer and activist against hunger (b. 1908)
- September 26 – Anna Magnani, Italian actress (b. 1908)
- September 28 – Norma Crane, American actress (b. 1928)
- September 29 – W. H. Auden, English poet (b. 1907)

=== October ===
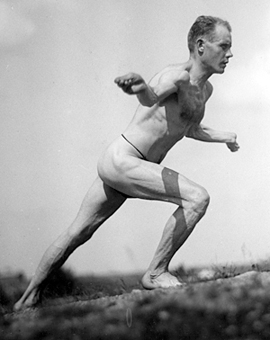
Paavo Nurmi

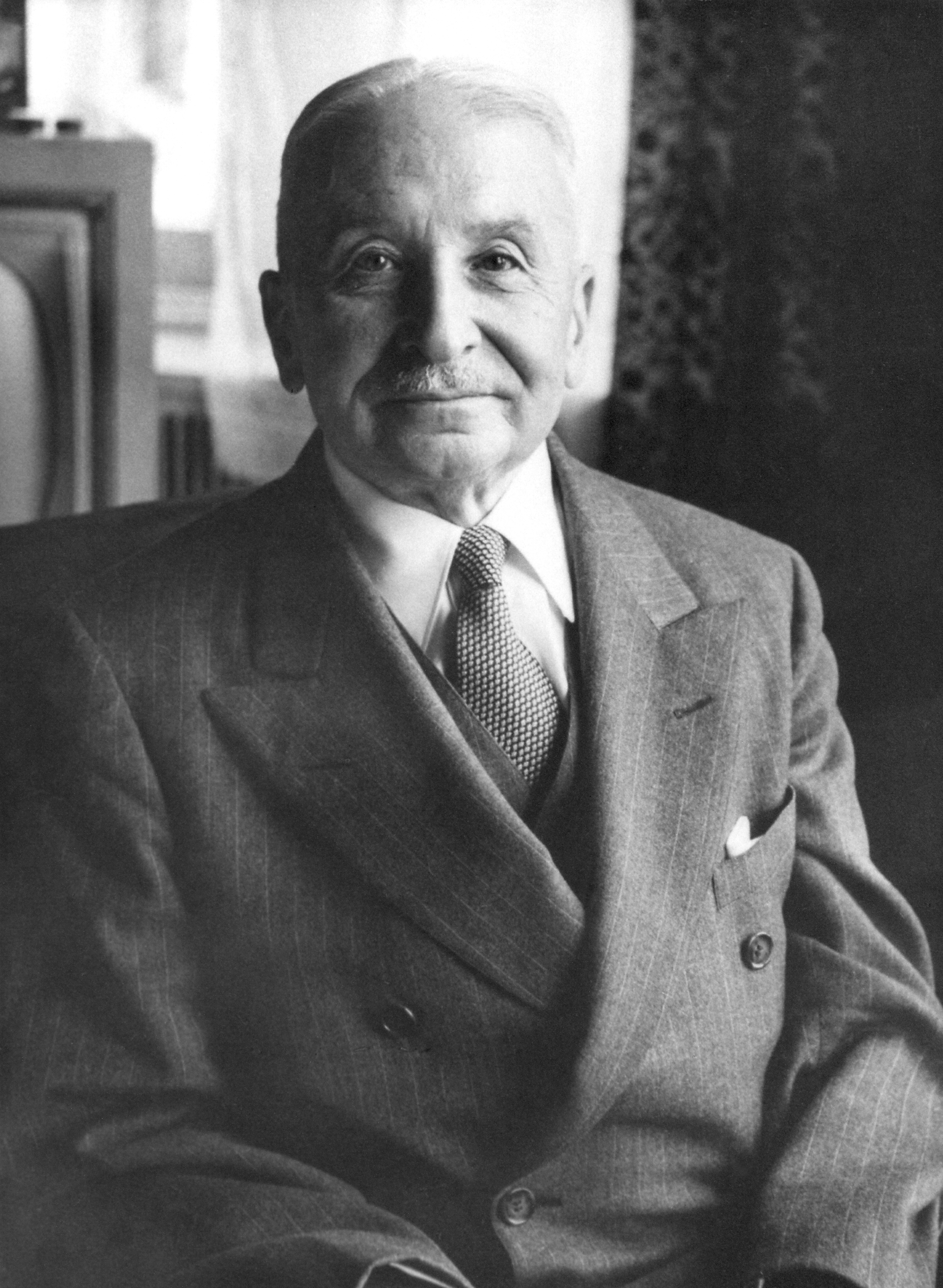
Ludwig von Mises

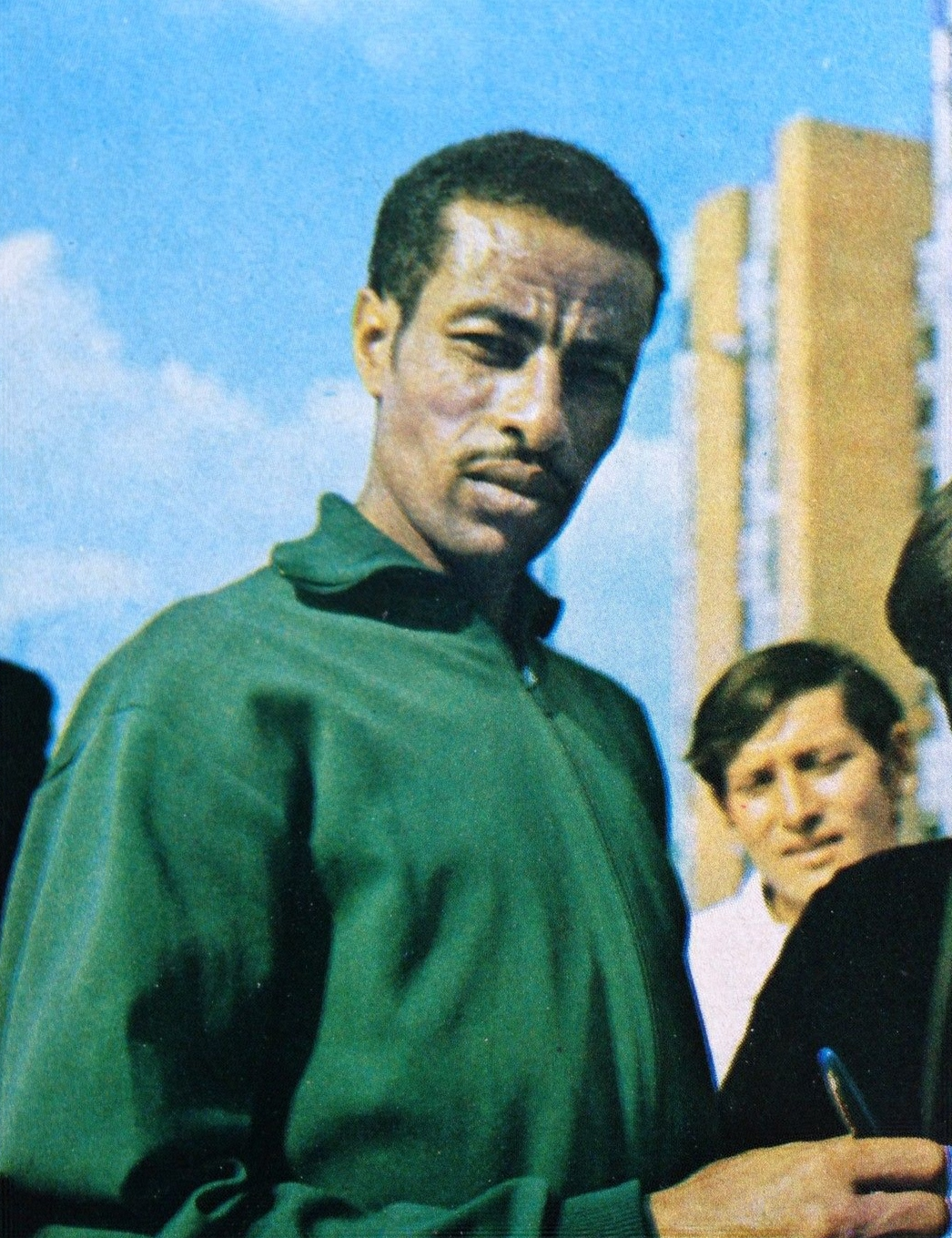
Abebe Bikila

- October 2 – Paavo Nurmi, Finnish Olympic athlete (b. 1897)
- October 6 – François Cevert, French racing driver (b. 1944)
- October 8 – Gabriel Marcel, French Catholic existential thinker (b. 1889)
- October 9 – Sister Rosetta Tharpe, American singer and guitarist (b. 1915)
- October 10 – Ludwig von Mises, Austrian economist (b. 1881)
- October 16 – Gene Krupa, American jazz drummer (b. 1909)
- October 17 – Ingeborg Bachmann, Austrian poet and author (b. 1926)
- October 18 – Leo Strauss, German-American political philosopher (b. 1899)
- October 19 – Margaret C. Anderson, American magazine publisher (b. 1886)
- October 20 – Mohammad Hashim Maiwandwal, prime minister of Afghanistan (b. 1921)
- October 22 – Pablo Casals, Spanish cellist and conductor (b. 1876)
- October 25 – Abebe Bikila, Ethiopian Olympic athlete (b. 1932)
- October 26 – Semyon Budyonny, Cossack cavalryman and Marshal of the Soviet Union (b. 1883)
- October 27 – Allan Lane, American actor (b. 1909)
- October 28
  - Cleo Moore, American actress (b. 1924)
  - Taha Hussein, Egyptian writer (b. 1889)

=== November ===
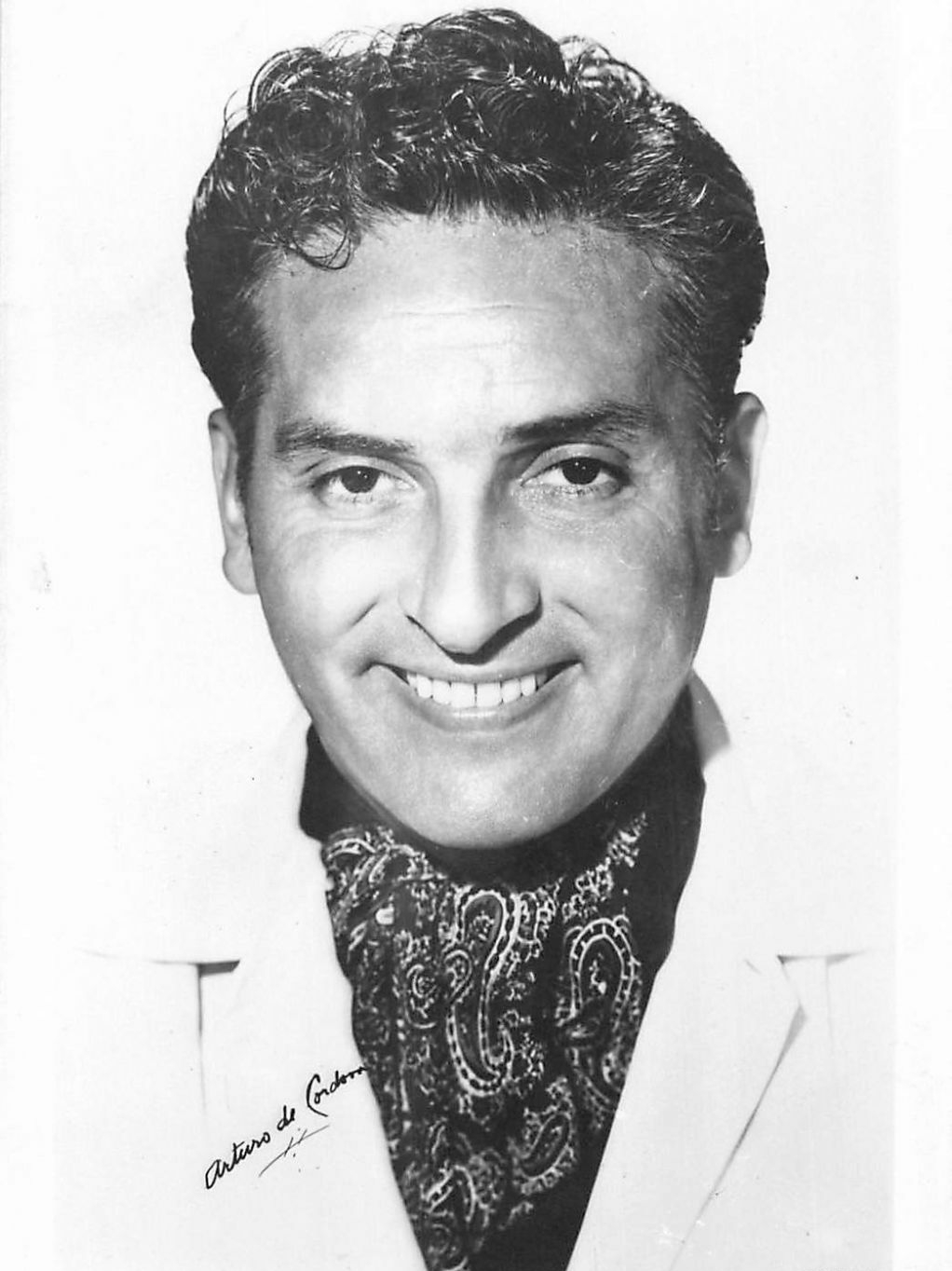
Arturo de Córdova

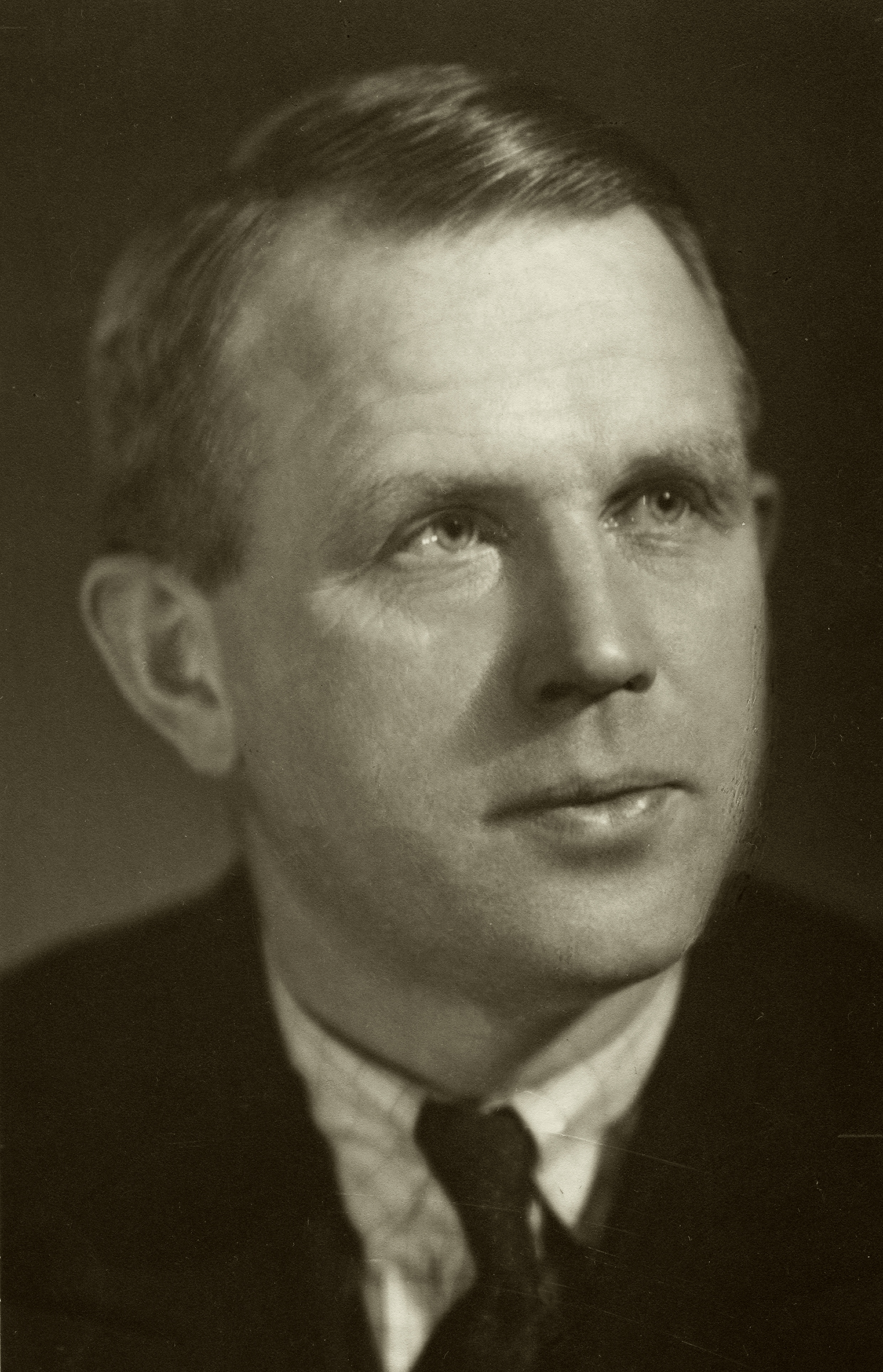
Artturi Ilmari Virtanen

- November 3
  - Arturo de Córdova, Mexican actor (b. 1908)
  - Marc Allégret, French film director (b. 1900)
- November 7 – Kiyohide Shima, Japanese admiral (b. 1890)
- November 10 – Morton Deyo, American admiral (b. 1887)
- November 11
  - Hassan al-Hudaybi, Egyptian general (b. 1891)
  - Artturi Ilmari Virtanen, Finnish chemist, Nobel Prize laureate (b. 1895)
- November 12 – Wacław Stachiewicz, Polish writer, geologist and general (b. 1894)
- November 13
  - Lila Lee, American actress (b. 1905)
  - Bruno Maderna, Italian conductor and composer (b. 1920)
  - Elsa Schiaparelli, Italian fashion designer (b. 1890)
- November 17 – Mirra Alfassa, multi-origined spiritual leader and founder of Auroville, India (b. 1878)
- November 18 – Alois Hába, Czech composer and musicologist (b. 1893)
- November 20 – Allan Sherman, American comedy writer, television producer and song parodist (b. 1924)
- November 23
  - Sessue Hayakawa, Japanese-born American actor and film director (b. 1886)
  - Constance Talmadge, American actress (b. 1898)
- November 25
  - Albert DeSalvo, American criminal, suspect in the Boston Strangler case (b. 1931)
  - Laurence Harvey, English actor (b. 1928)

=== December ===
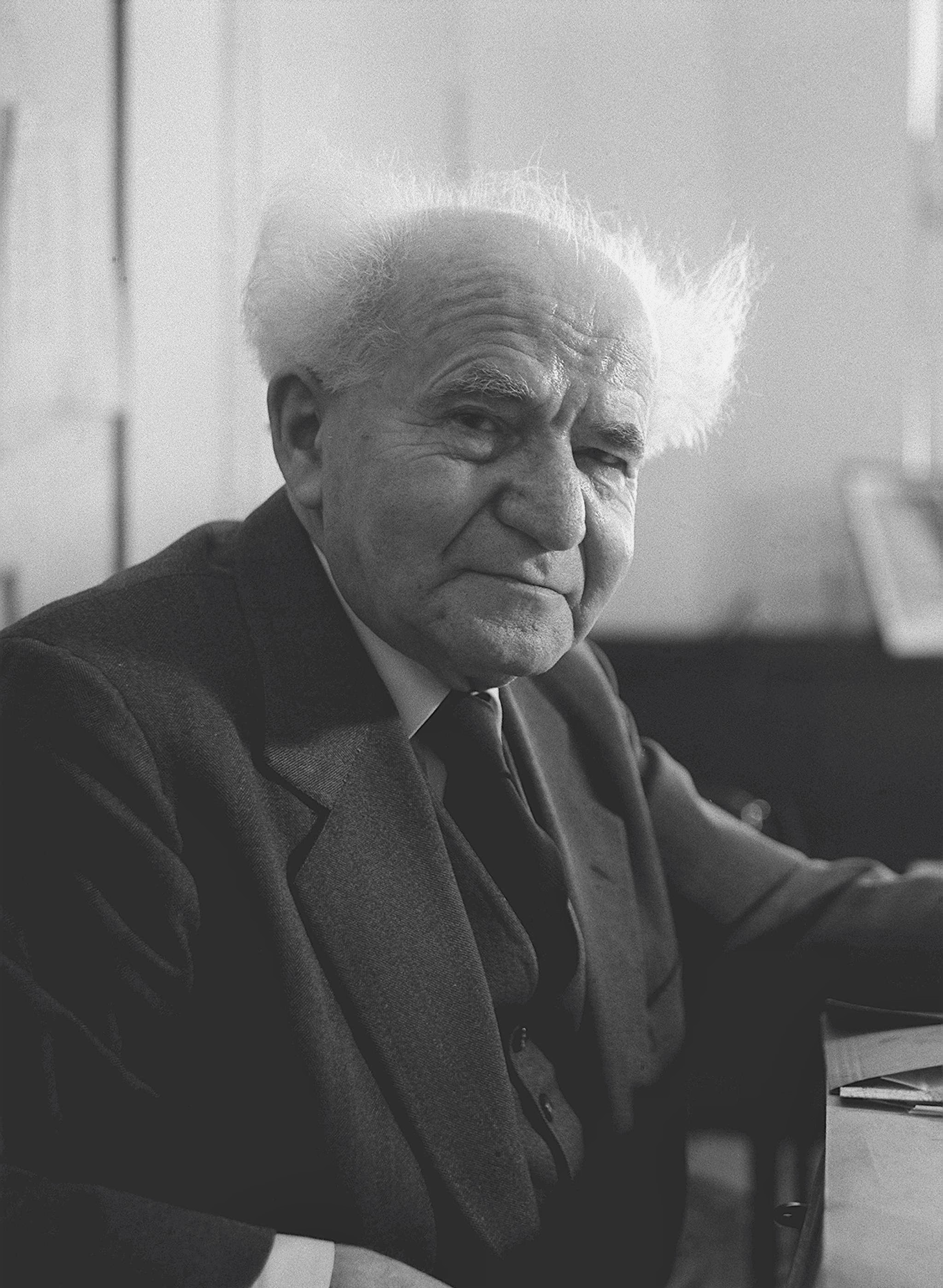
David Ben-Gurion

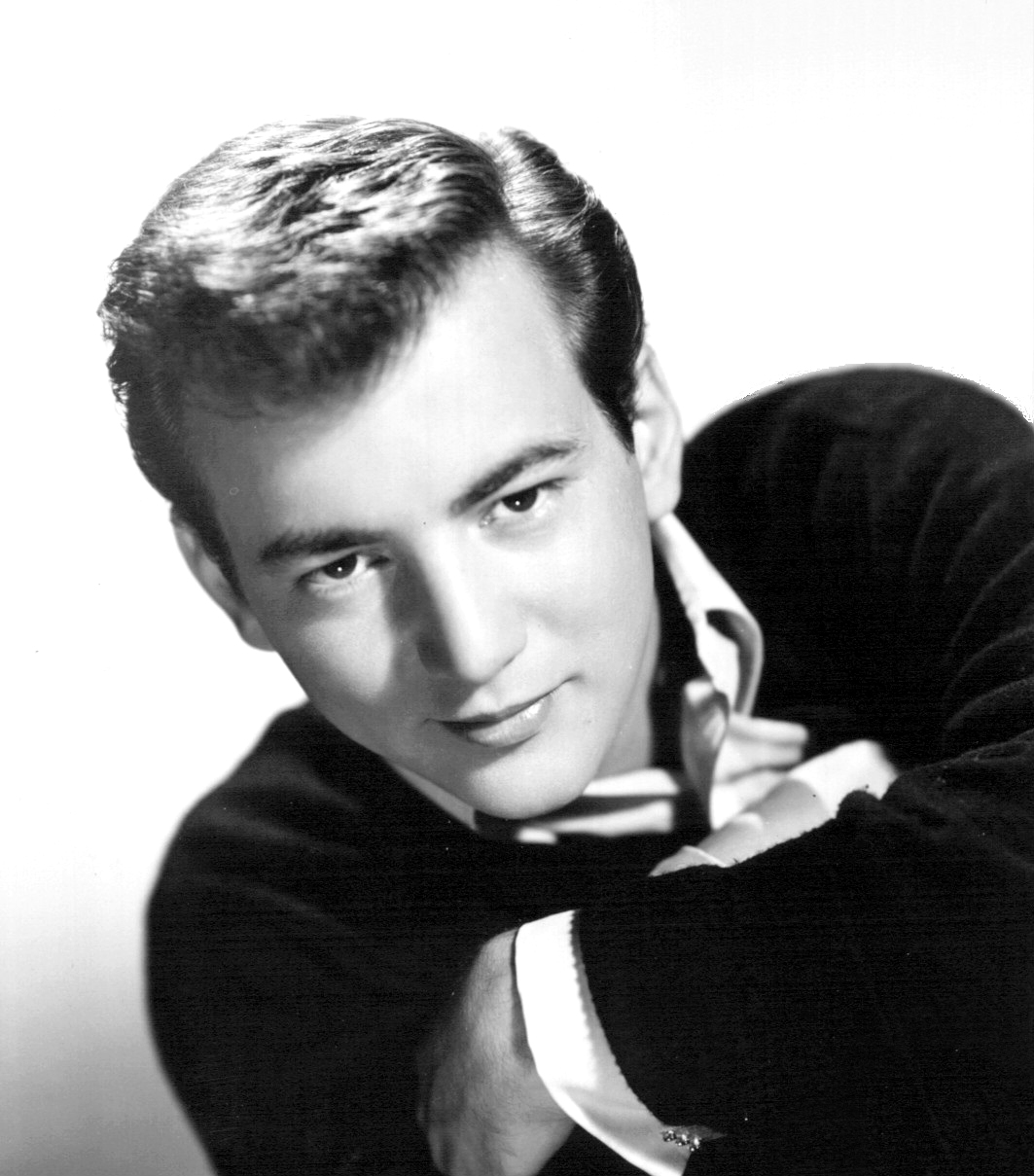
Bobby Darin

- December 1 – David Ben-Gurion, 1st Prime Minister of Israel (b. 1886)
- December 2 – Richard G. Colbert, American admiral (b. 1915)
- December 3 – Adolfo Ruiz Cortines, 47th President of Mexico (b. 1889)
- December 4 – Lauri Lehtinen, Finnish Olympic athlete (b. 1908)
- December 5 – Sir Robert Watson-Watt, Scottish engineer, radar pioneer (b. 1892)
- December 12
  - Atilio García, Argentine-born Uruguayan footballer (b. 1914)
  - Naokuni Nomura, Japanese admiral and Minister of the Navy (b. 1885)
- December 13 – Giuseppe Beltrami, Italian Roman Catholic cardinal (b. 1889)
- December 16 – Sid Barnes, Australian cricketer (b. 1916)
- December 17 – Charles Greeley Abbot, American astrophysicist (b. 1872)
- December 20
  - Luis Carrero Blanco, Spanish admiral and politician, 69th Prime Minister of Spain (b. 1904)
  - Richard Cain, police officer associated with the Chicago Outfit (b. 1931).
  - Bobby Darin, American singer-songwriter, musician, actor, dancer, impressionist and TV presenter (b. 1936)
- December 22 – James Anderson, Australian tennis champion (b. 1894)
- December 23 – Gerard Kuiper, Dutch-born American astronomer (b. 1905)
- December 24 – Fritz Gause, German historian (b. 1893)
- December 25
  - İsmet İnönü, Turkish general and statesman, 3-time Prime Minister of Turkey and 2nd President of Turkey during World War II (b. 1884)
  - Gabriel Voisin, French aviation pioneer (b. 1880)
- December 26
  - William Haines, American actor (b. 1900)
  - Harold B. Lee, American president of the Church of Jesus Christ of Latter-day Saints (b. 1899)

== Nobel Prizes ==

- Physics – Leo Esaki, Ivar Giaever, Brian David Josephson
- Chemistry – Ernst Otto Fischer, Geoffrey Wilkinson
- Medicine – Karl von Frisch, Konrad Lorenz, Nikolaas Tinbergen
- Literature – Patrick White
- Peace – Henry Kissinger, Lê Đức Thọ
- Economics – Wassily Leontief
