= Jim Croce discography =

Cataloging of published recordings by Jim Croce

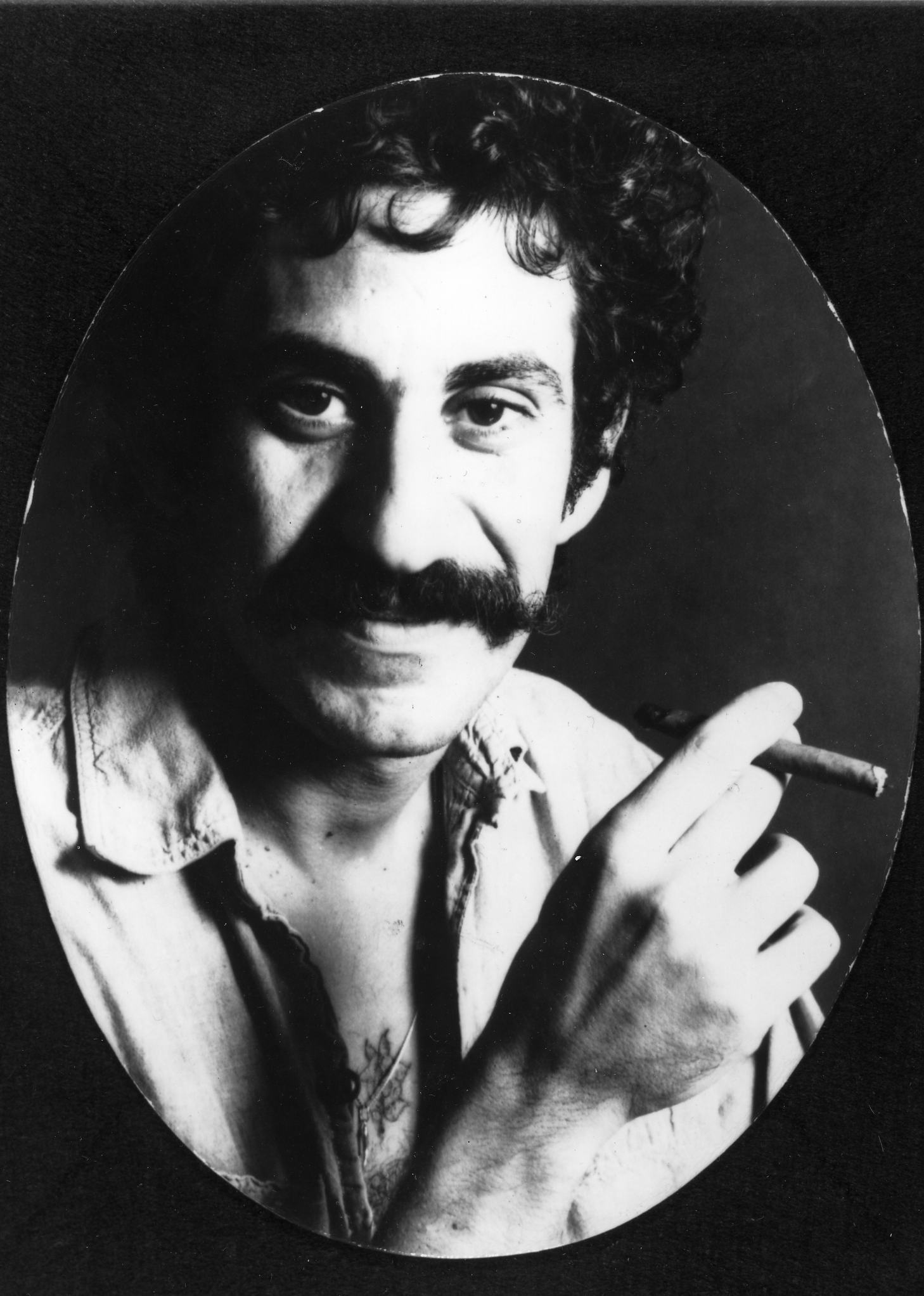
- Studio albums: 5
- Live albums: 3
- Compilation albums: 22
- Singles: 12
- Video albums: 1
- Music videos: 2

James Joseph "Jim" Croce was an American singer-songwriter with five studio albums and 12 singles to his credit. His posthumously-released fifth studio album was completed just prior to his 1973 death, and seven singles were also posthumously issued, one of which was "Time in a Bottle" from a previous album You Don't Mess Around with Jim. His popularity continued long after his death with the release of numerous compilation albums and "new" material (from the vaults) being portioned out sporadically over the years. Three live albums, as well as a live DVD, have also been published.

Croce's first two studio albums Facets and Croce (aka Jim & Ingrid Croce) did not chart, but his third, You Don't Mess Around with Jim, peaked at No. 1 on the Billboard 200 following his death. This album featured three singles, "You Don't Mess Around with Jim", "Operator (That's Not the Way It Feels)", and "Time in a Bottle." His fourth album Life and Times peaked at No. 2 in the United States but reached No. 1 in Canada in late December 1973. It featured the singles "One Less Set of Footsteps", "Bad, Bad Leroy Brown", and "It Doesn't Have to Be That Way".

"Bad, Bad Leroy Brown" achieved great success, reaching the No. 1 position on the Billboard Hot 100. "Time in a Bottle" went from a relatively unknown album cut to a posthumous No. 1 after the boost it received from being featured in the ABC TV-movie She Lives. His fifth album, I Got a Name, was released in December 1973 and reached the No. 2 position in both the United States and Canada. This album would feature the title song "I Got a Name", "I'll Have to Say I Love You in a Song", and "Workin' at the Car Wash Blues". The song, "I Got a Name" had been released as a single during Croce's lifetime, but "I'll Have to Say I Love You in a Song" became a posthumous number one release when it reached the top position on Billboard Adult Contemporary Singles in 1974.

Several compilation albums such as Down the Highway and The Faces I've Been were released in the mid 1970s, the latter containing unissued and demo recordings from an unreleased album. Two songs from "The Faces I've Been" were released as singles, "Chain Gang Medley" and "Mississippi Lady". They would be his final singles released. Another compilation album, Photographs & Memories became a successful release by reaching No. 1 on the Canadian charts and No. 2 on the Billboard 200 in the United States. It also achieved a platinum certification in the United States, and a Gold certification in Hong Kong.

Even after his death, his popularity continued and a demand for unreleased material caused a live album to be released, Jim Croce Live: The Final Tour. It was recorded during the summer of 1973. More demo recordings were released in 2003 on the album Home Recordings: Americana. A DVD featuring live concert footage was also released in 2003, Have You Heard: Jim Croce Live which later spawned a CD featuring the audio from the concert footage.

== Studio albums ==
List of albums, with selected chart positions and certifications
Title	Album details	Peak chart positions			Certifications
Title	Album details	US	CAN	AUS	Certifications
Facets	Released: 1966; Label: Croce-101; Self-released	—	—	—	
Jim & Ingrid Croce	Released: January 1969; Label: Capitol Records	—	—	—	
You Don't Mess Around with Jim	Released: April 1972; Label: ABC Records	1	1	—	US: Gold
Life and Times	Released: January 1973; Label: ABC Records	7	1	—	US: Gold
I Got a Name	Released: December 1973; Label: ABC Records	2	2	69	US: Gold
"—" denotes releases that did not chart

== Live albums ==
List of albums, with selected chart positions and certifications
Title	Album details	Peak chart positions		Certifications
Title	Album details	US	CAN	Certifications
Jim Croce Live: The Final Tour	Released: 1989; Label: Saja	—	—	
Have You Heard: Jim Croce Live	Released: January 31, 2006; Label: Shout! Factory	—	—	
The Lost Recordings	Released: August 27, 2013; Label: Sony Music	—	—	
"—" denotes releases that did not chart

== Compilation albums ==
List of albums, with selected chart positions and certifications
Title	Album details	Peak chart positions			Certifications
Title	Album details	US	CAN	NZ	Certifications
Photographs & Memories: His Greatest Hits	Released: September 1974; Label: ABC	2	1	—	US: Platinum; HK: Gold
The Faces I've Been	Released: 1975; Label: Lifesong	87	83	—	
Greatest Hits	Released: May 1975; Label: RCA	—	35	—	CAN: Gold
Time in a Bottle: Jim Croce's Greatest Love Songs	Released: 1976; Label: Lifesong	170	—	—	
Bad, Bad Leroy Brown: Jim Croce's Greatest Character Songs	Released: 1978; Label: Lifesong	—	—	—	
The Legendary Jim Croce	Released: June 1978; Label: Lifesong	—	—	4	
Down the Highway	Released: 1980; Label: Saja	—	—	—	
Collection	Released: December 1, 1986; Label: Castle	—	—	—	UK: Silver
The 50th Anniversary Collection	Released: September 22, 1992; Label: Saja	—	—	—	
Bad, Bad Leroy Brown & Other Favorites	Released: 1994; Label: CEMA	116	—	—	
24 Karat Gold in a Bottle	Released: July 15, 1994; Label: DCC Compact Classics	—	—	—	
The Best of Jim Croce	Released: October 27, 1998; Label: Music Club Records	—	—	—	
Simply the Best: Time in a Bottle – His Greatest Hits	Released: May 25, 1999; Label: Woodford	—	—	—	
Words and Music	Released: September 14, 1999; Label: DCC Compact Classics	—	—	—	
The Definitive Collection: "Time in a Bottle"	Released: May 16, 2000; Label: Essential Records	—	—	—	
VH1 Behind the Music: The Jim Croce Collection	Released: August 21, 2001; Label: Rhino	—	—	—	
Home Recordings: Americana	Released: October 14, 2003; Label: High Coin	—	—	—	
Classic Hits	Released: January 27, 2004; Label: Rhino	—	—	—	
The Way We Used to Be: The Anthology	Released: September 13, 2004; Label: Sanctuary	—	—	—	
The Very Best of Jim Croce	Released: January 15, 2007; Label: Phantom Import Distribution	—	—	—	
The Original Albums ... Plus	Released: July 5, 2011; Label: Edsel Records	—	—	—	
The Lost Recordings	Released: 2011; Label: Sony Music	—	—	—	
An Introduction to: Jim Croce	Released: March 29, 2019; Label: Rhino Entertainment				
"—" denotes releases that did not chart

== Singles ==
List of singles, with selected chart positions and certifications, showing year released and album name
Year	Title	Peak chart positions									Certifications	Album
Year	Title	US	US AC	US Country	CAN	CAN AC	AUS	NL	GER	FRA	Certifications	Album
1972	"You Don't Mess Around with Jim"	8	9	—	4	—	80	—	—	15		You Don't Mess Around with Jim
1972	"Operator (That's Not the Way It Feels)"	17	11	—	10	—	—	—	—	—		You Don't Mess Around with Jim
1973	"One Less Set of Footsteps"	37	8	—	41	27	—	—	—	—		Life and Times
1973	"Bad, Bad Leroy Brown"	1	9	—	1	3	19	27	38	—	US: Gold	Life and Times
1973	"I Got a Name"	10	4	—	8	5	49	25	—	—		I Got a Name
1973	"Time in a Bottle"	1	1	—	1	1	60	—	—	106	US: Gold	You Don't Mess Around with Jim
1973	"It Doesn't Have to Be That Way"	64	—	—	47	53	—	—	—	—		Life and Times
1974	"I'll Have to Say I Love You in a Song"	9	1	68	4	—	100	29	—	—		I Got a Name
1974	"Workin' at the Car Wash Blues"	32	9	—	18	2	—	—	—	—		I Got a Name
1975	"Lover's Cross"^{[A]}	—	—	—	—	—	—	—	—	—		I Got a Name
1975	"Chain Gang Medley"	63	22	—	29	20	—	—	—	—		The Faces I've Been
1976	"Mississippi Lady"^{B}	—	—	—	—	—	—	—	—	—		The Faces I've Been
"—" denotes releases that did not chart

- ^{B}Peaked at 10 on Bubbling Under Hot 100 Singles.

== Videography ==
=== DVDs ===
List of DVD releases with selected details
Title	Album details
Have You Heard: Jim Croce Live	Released: October 14, 2003; Label: Shout! Factory; Format: DVD

=== Music videos ===
List of music videos
Year	Title
2003	"Time in a Bottle"
2003	"I'll Have to Say I Love You in a Song"

== Tribute albums ==
- The Ventures: The Ventures Play the Jim Croce Songbook (1974)
- Jerry Reed: Jerry Reed Sings Jim Croce (1980)
- Various Artists: Jim Croce: A Nashville Tribute (1997)

== Notes ==
- A "Lover's Cross" was only released as a single in the United Kingdom.
