= Time in a Bottle: Jim Croce's Greatest Love Songs =

Greatest hits album by Jim Croce
- Released: 1976
- Recorded: 1972–73
- Genre: Folk rock
- Length: 31:35
- Label: Lifesong
- Producer: Terry Cashman

Jim Croce chronology
The Faces I've Been (1975)	Time in a Bottle: Jim Croce's Greatest Love Songs (1976)	Down the Highway (1980)

Time in a Bottle: Jim Croce's Greatest Love Songs is a greatest hits album by American singer-songwriter Jim Croce. It was released after his 1973 death and features sentimental songs compiled from his studio albums. The album peaked at No. 170 on the Billboard 200 during 1977. Since its original release, it has also been reissued on cassette and compact disc.

== Reception ==
Professional ratings
Review scores
Source	Rating
Allmusic	4.5/5 stars

In a retrospective review of the album for AllMusic, Stephen Thomas Erlewine stated that "Since it contains only his love ballads, fans who prefer his sweetly sentimental songs like 'Operator' and 'Time in a Bottle,' to story-songs like 'Bad, Bad Leroy Brown' and 'You Don't Mess Around With Jim,' will find Time in a Bottle the essential compilation." and that "Despite the amount of good material here, Photographs and Memories remains a better collection, because it presents both sides of the popular singer/songwriter."

== Track listing ==
No.	Title	Writer(s)	Length
1.	"Time in a Bottle" (From You Don't Mess Around with Jim)	Jim Croce	2:28
2.	"Operator (That's Not the Way It Feels)" (From You Don't Mess Around with Jim)	Croce	3:49
3.	"Salon and Saloon" (From I Got a Name)	Maury Muehleisen	2:35
4.	"Alabama Rain" (From Life and Times)	Croce	2:15
5.	"Dreamin' Again" (From Life and Times)	Croce	2:42
6.	"It Doesn't Have to Be That Way" (From Life and Times)	Croce	2:34
7.	"I'll Have to Say I Love You in a Song" (From I Got a Name)	Croce	2:34
8.	"Lover's Cross" (From I Got a Name)	Croce	3:05
9.	"Thursday" (From I Got a Name)	Sal Joseph	3:14
10.	"These Dreams" (From Life and Times)	Croce	3:12
11.	"A Long Time Ago" (From You Don't Mess Around with Jim)	Croce	2:06
12.	"Photographs and Memories" (From You Don't Mess Around with Jim)	Croce	2:04

== Charts ==
Chart (1977)	Peak position
US Billboard 200	170

== Personnel ==
- Jim Croce – guitar, vocals
