= Photographs & Memories =

Photographs & Memories: His Greatest Hits

Greatest hits album by Jim Croce
- Released: September 26, 1974
- Recorded: 1971–1973
- Genre: Rock; folk
- Length: 41:14
- Label: ABC
- Producer: Terry Cashman, Tommy West

Jim Croce chronology
I Got a Name (1973)	Photographs & Memories: His Greatest Hits (1974)	The Faces I've Been (1975)

Photographs & Memories: His Greatest Hits is the first greatest hits album by American singer-songwriter Jim Croce, released on September 26, 1974, by ABC Records. The album was Croce's second posthumous release following his 1973 death in an airplane crash.

The inner photo jacket includes a tributary essay on one side and a photo of Jim's son Adrian James (A.J.) on the other. The title track originally appeared on the You Don't Mess Around with Jim LP as well as the B-side of the album title track single in 1972. The album has since been reissued on vinyl in 2020 by BMG.

== Critical reception ==
Professional ratings
Review scores
Source	Rating
AllMusic	4.5/5 stars
Christgau's Record Guide	B+

In a 1974 review in Billboard magazine, the editors wrote: "It is hard to believe one man poured out a fountain of excellent work in barely two years, but this LP offers proof of the greatness of Croce's career and is, in all respects, truly a greatest hits album. They're all worthwhile and this magnificent collection makes one realize just how greatly this man will be missed. The beauty of music, however, is that he will always be heard."

== Track listing ==
All tracks are written by Jim Croce, except "I Got a Name", written by Charles Fox & Norman Gimbel.

No.	Title	Original album	Length
1.	"Bad, Bad Leroy Brown"	Life and Times	2:59
2.	"Operator (That's Not the Way It Feels)"	You Don't Mess Around with Jim	3:49
3.	"Photographs and Memories"	You Don't Mess Around with Jim	2:08
4.	"Rapid Roy (The Stock Car Boy)"	You Don't Mess Around with Jim	2:46
5.	"Time in a Bottle"	You Don't Mess Around with Jim	2:28
6.	"New York's Not My Home"	You Don't Mess Around with Jim	3:07
7.	"Workin' at the Car Wash Blues"	I Got a Name	2:34
8.	"I Got a Name"	I Got a Name	3:14
9.	"I'll Have to Say I Love You in a Song"	I Got a Name	2:34
10.	"You Don't Mess Around with Jim"	You Don't Mess Around with Jim	3:02
11.	"Lover's Cross"	I Got a Name	3:04
12.	"One Less Set of Footsteps"	Life and Times	2:47
13.	"These Dreams"	Life and Times	3:14
14.	"Roller Derby Queen"	Life and Times	3:28
Total length:			41:14

== Chart and certifications ==
=== Weekly charts ===
Year	Chart	Position
1974	US Billboard 200	2
1974	Canadian RPM 100	1

=== Year-end charts ===
Chart (1974)	Position
Canada RPM Top 100 Albums	12
US Billboard 200	21
US Cash Box Top 100	24

Chart (1975)	Position
Canada RPM Top 100 Albums	16

=== Certifications ===
Country	Certifications
United States	Platinum
Hong Kong	Gold
