= List of Canadian number-one albums of 1974 =

This article lists the Canadian number-one albums of 1974. The chart was compiled and published by RPM every Saturday.

The top position (December 29, 1973, Vol. 20, No. 20) preceding January 12, 1974 (Vol. 20, No. 21-22) was Jim Croce's Life and Times. Three acts held the top position in the albums and singles charts simultaneously: Love Unlimited on March 2, Gordon Lightfoot on June 22 – 29 and Elton John on August 10. As well, Marvin Hamlisch's "The Entertainer" taken from The Sting topped the chart on May 25 as the soundtrack to the film topped the album charts .

(Entries with dates marked thus* are not presently on record at Library and Archives Canada and were inferred from the following week's listing. There was no publication on May 4. The preceding chart for April 27 (Vol. 21, No. 11) is chronologically followed by the chart for May 11 (Vol. 21, No. 12). September 28's listing presently has the singles and album charts reversed; as well, the album chart is that of August 24. Hence, the reading was inferred from the following week's chart.)

| Issue date | Album | Artist |
|---|---|---|
| January 5 | Life and Times | Jim Croce |
| January 12 | The Joker | Steve Miller Band |
| January 19 | The Joker | Steve Miller Band |
| January 26 | The Singles: 1969–1973 | The Carpenters |
| February 2 | You Don't Mess Around with Jim | Jim Croce |
| February 9 | You Don't Mess Around with Jim | Jim Croce |
| February 16 | You Don't Mess Around with Jim | Jim Croce |
| February 23 | John Denver's Greatest Hits | John Denver |
| March 2 | Under the Influence of... Love Unlimited | Love Unlimited |
| March 9 | Planet Waves | Bob Dylan |
| March 16 | Court and Spark | Joni Mitchell |
| March 23* | Court and Spark | Joni Mitchell |
| March 30 | Court and Spark | Joni Mitchell |
| April 6 | Tubular Bells | Mike Oldfield |
| April 13 | Tubular Bells | Mike Oldfield |
| April 20 | Seasons in the Sun | Terry Jacks |
| April 27 | Seasons in the Sun | Terry Jacks |
| May 4 | Seasons in the Sun | Terry Jacks |
| May 11 | The Sting | Original Soundtrack |
| May 18 | The Sting | Original Soundtrack |
| May 25 | The Sting | Original Soundtrack |
| June 1 | The Sting | Original Soundtrack |
| June 8 | The Sting | Original Soundtrack |
| June 15 | Band on the Run | Wings |
| June 22 | Sundown | Gordon Lightfoot |
| June 29 | Sundown | Gordon Lightfoot |
| July 6 | Sundown | Gordon Lightfoot |
| July 13 | Sundown | Gordon Lightfoot |
| July 20 | Sundown | Gordon Lightfoot |
| July 27 | Diamond Dogs | David Bowie |
| August 3 | Diamond Dogs | David Bowie |
| August 10 | Caribou | Elton John |
| August 17 | Back Home Again | John Denver |
| August 24 | Caribou | Elton John |
| August 31 | 461 Ocean Boulevard | Eric Clapton |
| September 7 | 461 Ocean Boulevard | Eric Clapton |
| September 14 | 461 Ocean Boulevard | Eric Clapton |
| September 21 | 461 Ocean Boulevard | Eric Clapton |
| September 28* | Fulfillingness' First Finale | Stevie Wonder |
| October 5 | Endless Summer | The Beach Boys |
| October 12 | If You Love Me, Let Me Know | Olivia Newton-John |
| October 19 | Not Fragile | Bachman-Turner Overdrive |
| October 26 | Not Fragile | Bachman-Turner Overdrive |
| November 2 | So Far | Crosby, Stills, Nash & Young |
| November 9 | Wrap Around Joy | Carole King |
| November 16 | Not Fragile | Bachman-Turner Overdrive |
| November 23 | Not Fragile | Bachman-Turner Overdrive |
| November 30 | Walls and Bridges | John Lennon |
| December 6 | Photographs & Memories | Jim Croce |
| December 14 | Elton John's Greatest Hits | Elton John |
| December 21 | Elton John's Greatest Hits | Elton John |
| December 25 | Photographs & Memories | Jim Croce |

== See also ==
- 1974 in music
- RPM number-one hits of 1974
