= Jim Croce: A Nashville Tribute =

Compilation album by Various artists
- Released: July 15, 1997
- Studio: 16th Ave Sound; Canyon Moon Recorders; CRC (Chicago, Illinois); Masterphonics (Nashville, Tennessee); Ocean Way (Nashville, Tennessee); River North Studios; Scruggs Sound (Berry Hill, Tennessee); Sound Stage (Nashville, Tennessee); Twin Pines Studio
- Genre: Country music
- Length: 38:30
- Label: River North Records
- Producer: Brent Rowan, Ira Antelis

Jim Croce: A Nashville Tribute is a tribute album released by River North Records in 1997. The album consisted of contemporary country artists performing cover versions of songs by Jim Croce.

Mary Grady of Allmusic rated the album two stars out of five, saying that "If you like any of the particular artists on this collection, you may enjoy it on a case-by-case basis. If you are fan of Jim Croce, this contemporary country approach to his material may win you over, although it will undoubtedly lack the appeal of the music as delivered by its original author. If you are a fan of neither, this is not a disc you will want to own."

Professional ratings
Review scores
Source	Rating
Allmusic	2/5 stars

== Track listing ==
No.	Title	Artist	Length
1.	"I Got a Name"	Sammy Kershaw	3:30
2.	"Box #10"	Charlie Daniels	3:22
3.	"New York's Not My Home"	Ronna Reeves	3:23
4.	"One Less Set of Footsteps"	Larry Stewart	4:17
5.	"Photographs and Memories"	Crystal Bernard	2:46
6.	"Rapid Roy (The Stock Car Boy)"	Mark Collie	3:09
7.	"Operator (That's Not the Way It Feels)"	Rodney Crowell	4:25
8.	"Bad, Bad Leroy Brown"	Kim Carnes	4:18
9.	"I'll Have to Say I Love You in a Song"	Lane Brody	3:10
10.	"You Don't Mess Around With Jim"	Charlie Major	2:24
11.	"Time in a Bottle"	Michael English	2:46

== Personnel ==
- Ira Antelis – background vocals
- Eddie Bayers – drums
- Barry Beckett – piano
- Crystal Bernard – vocals on "Photographs and Memories"
- Lane Brody – vocals on "I'll Have to Say I Love You in a Song"
- Kim Carnes – vocals on "Bad, Bad Leroy Brown"
- Mark Collie – vocals on "Rapid Roy (The Stock Car Boy)"
- Rodney Crowell – vocals on "Operator (That's Not the Way It Feels)"
- Charlie Daniels – dobro, fiddle, and vocals on "Box #10"
- Jerry Douglas – dobro
- Dan Dugmore – steel guitar
- Michael English – vocals on "Time in a Bottle"
- Larry Franklin – fiddle
- Tom Griffin – background vocals
- Tony Harrell – keyboards, piano
- Sammy Kershaw – vocals on "I Got a Name"
- Charlie Major – vocals on "You Don't Mess Around With Jim"
- Billy Panda – acoustic guitar, slide guitar
- Ronna Reeves – vocals on "New York's Not My Name"
- Michael Rhodes – bass guitar
- Chris Rodriguez – background vocals
- Brent Rowan – electric guitar
- Johnny Rutledge – background vocals
- Gino Speight – background vocals
- Keith Stegall – background vocals
- Larry Stewart – vocals on "One Less Set of Footsteps"
