= Have You Heard: Jim Croce Live =

Live album by Jim Croce
- Released: January 31, 2006 (CD); October 14, 2003 (DVD)
- Recorded: 1973
- Genre: Folk rock
- Length: 46:43
- Label: Shout! Factory
- Producer: Jeff Palo

Jim Croce chronology
Home Recordings: Americana (2003)	Have You Heard: Jim Croce Live (2006)

Professional ratings
Review scores
Source	Rating
Allmusic	4/5 stars

Have You Heard: Jim Croce Live is a live album by American singer-songwriter Jim Croce, released in 2006, over thirty years after his death. The album is a companion to a DVD released in 2003 of Jim Croce's performances. The recordings were taken from different television programs that Croce appeared on. Two of the tracks on the DVD, "Time in a Bottle" and "I'll Have to Say I Love You in a Song", were cut from the CD release because they were not live performances.

== Track listing ==
All tracks are written by Jim Croce.

No.	Title	Length
1.	"You Don't Mess Around with Jim"	2:46
2.	"Operator (That's Not the Way It Feels)"	3:30
3.	"Introduction to Roller Derby Queen"	1:11
4.	"Roller Derby Queen"	2:41
5.	"One Less Set of Footsteps"	2:32
6.	"Next Time, This Time"	2:48
7.	"Introduction to Speedball Tucker"	3:36
8.	"Speedball Tucker"	2:22
9.	"Lover's Cross"	2:57
10.	"Introduction to Workin' at the Car Wash Blues"	0:32
11.	"Workin' at the Car Wash Blues"	2:04
12.	"Introduction to Bad, Bad, Leroy Brown"	1:37
13.	"Bad, Bad Leroy Brown"	2:49
14.	"New York's Not My Home"	2:59
15.	"The Hard Way Everytime"	3:32
16.	"Introduction to Rapid Roy (The Stockcar Boy)"	2:02
17.	"Rapid Roy (The Stockcar Boy)"	2:34
18.	"These Dreams"	3:07
19.	"Hard Time Losin' Man"	2:14

DVD
No.	Title	Length
1.	"Prologue: Photographs and Memories"	2:05
2.	"You Don't Mess Around With Jim"	2:55
3.	"Operator (That's Not the Way It Feels)"	3:29
4.	"Roller Derby Queen"	3:54
5.	"One Less Set of Footsteps"	2:33
6.	"Next Time, This Time"	2:46
7.	"Speedball Tucker"	5:48
8.	"Lovers Cross"	2:06
9.	"Workin' at the Car Wash Blues"	3:30
10.	"Interlude: I'll Have to Say I Love You in a Song"	2:30
11.	"Bad, Bad Leroy Brown"	4:27
12.	"New York's Not My Home"	3:00
13.	"The Hard Way Every Time"	2:31
14.	"Rapid Roy (The Stockcar Boy)"	4:37
15.	"These Dreams"	3:10
16.	"Epilogue: Time in a Bottle"	2:27

== Personnel ==
- Jim Croce – guitar, vocals
- Maury Muehleisen – guitar, vocals
