= Down the Highway (album) =

Compilation album by Jim Croce
- Released: 1980
- Recorded: The Hit Factory, New York City
- Genre: Folk rock
- Length: 35:35
- Label: Lifesong
- Producer: Terry Cashman, Tommy West

Jim Croce chronology
Time in a Bottle: Jim Croce's Greatest Love Songs (1976)	Down the Highway (1980)	Jim Croce Live: The Final Tour (1989)

Professional ratings
Review scores
Source	Rating
AllMusic	2/5 stars

Down the Highway is a compilation album by American singer-songwriter Jim Croce, released in 1980 on Lifesong Records as LS 8030.

== Track listing ==
All tracks composed by Jim Croce; except where indicated

1. "I Got a Name" (Charles Fox, Norman Gimbel) – 3:12
2. "Mississippi Lady" – 3:59
3. "New York's Not My Home" – 3:08
4. "Chain Gang Medley: Chain Gang/He Don't Love You/Searchin'" (Sam Cooke; Jerry Butler, Calvin Carter, Curtis Mayfield; Jerry Leiber, Mike Stoller) – 4:32
5. "You Don't Mess Around with Jim" – 3:03
6. "Ol' Man River" (Oscar Hammerstein, Jerome Kern) – 2:27
7. "Which Way Are You Goin'?" – 2:19
8. "Bad, Bad Leroy Brown" – 3:01
9. "Walkin' Back to Georgia" – 2:50
10. "Box #10" – 2:26
11. "Speedball Tucker" – 2:26
12. "Alabama Rain" – 2:12

== Production ==
- Producer: Terry Cashman, Tommy West
