= One Less Set of Footsteps =

Single by Jim Croce

from the album Life and Times
- B-side: "It Doesn't Have to Be That Way"
- Released: January 8, 1973
- Recorded: 1972
- Genre: Folk rock
- Length: 2:46
- Label: ABC
- Songwriter: Jim Croce
- Producers: Terry Cashman, Tommy West

Jim Croce singles chronology
"Operator (That's Not the Way It Feels)" (1972)	"One Less Set of Footsteps" (1973)	"Bad, Bad Leroy Brown" (1973)

"One Less Set of Footsteps" is a song written and performed by Jim Croce. It was released in 1973 as the first single from his album Life and Times. The song reached a peak of #37 on the Billboard Hot 100, spending 10 weeks on the chart.

== Content ==
The song describes a failing relationship between the narrator and his lover, and his realization that it is time for him to leave. Throughout the song, the narrator recounts the fact that they have been knowingly moving apart, but have been unwilling to recognize it openly, "running away from something [they] both know." In fact, he hints that she may have been seeing other men during their time together, and that he is just one of many to "walk in", that his may be just one more "pair of jeans" hanging on her door. While it seems clear that the narrator has put up with his lover's infidelity for a time, he has decided to finally move on, refusing to accept her "silence" about what has happened between them. The narrator acknowledges that "it's what we've done that makes us what we are", pointing out that their different choices in life have led them to become different types of people. He goes on to announce that his lover's "silver tongue has turned to clay, and [her] golden rule to rust," using these metaphors to suggest that she no longer has an enchanting hold over him, and that he is free to leave. The narrator sees that his "tomorrow's a dream away" only, and this relationship of "today" has in fact "turned to dust," opening his life to new possibilities. However, while he cannot hide his enthusiasm about going, he emphatically tells her, "don't be getting excited when you hear that slamming door." Because as the narrator exits, though she may have other men to keep her company, she will indeed have "one less set of footsteps on [her] floor in the morning."

Billboard described the song as a "happily presented story about the end of a relationship." Cash Box said that it "smacks with pure originality and is in his 'Operator' style of delivery." Record World called it "an exciting ditty."

== Form ==
The song is performed in the key of C Major, with the instrumentation of two acoustic guitars, acoustic piano, bass guitar, primary melody vocals, background harmony vocals, and drum set. The genre of the song could be considered to be in many categories, ranging from singer-songwriter to country, or from folk to classic rock. Following a brief guitar introduction, the song's structure is that of AABAA'BA, or two verses, followed by a chorus and a verse, a guitar solo in the form of a shortened verse, followed by a final repeat of the chorus and last verse. While most of the song is diatonic within the key of C, it does occasionally leave the central key, making use of the subtonic chord, as well as the secondary dominants of the V and vi chords.

== Personnel ==
According to liner notes of the album

- Jim Croce – lead vocals, rhythm guitar
- Maury Muehleisen – acoustic lead guitar
- Alan Rolnick – electric guitar
- Tommy West – piano, backing vocals
- Joe Macho – bass guitar
- Gary Chester – drums
- Terry Cashman – backing vocals

== Live performances ==
A live version of the song was released on his album Have You Heard: Jim Croce Live.

== Covers ==
- The song "One Less Set of Footsteps" was covered by Jerry Reed on his 1980 album Jerry Reed Sings Jim Croce.
- In 1992 Crystal Gayle covered it on her album Three Good Reasons.
- Larry Stewart also covered the song on the compilation album Jim Croce: A Nashville Tribute in 1997.
- The Ventures covered it on The Ventures Play the Jim Croce Songbook.
- A cover by Mary Hopkin was released on her 2009 album Now and Then.

== Track listing ==
7" Single (ABC-11346)

1. "One Less Set Of Footsteps" - 2:46
2. " It Doesn't Have to Be That Way" - 2:30

== Chart performance ==
Chart (1973)	Peak position
U.S. Billboard Hot 100	37
Canadian RPM Top Singles	41
Canadian RPM Adult Contemporary	27
U.S. Cash Box Top 100	30
U.S. Billboard Adult Contemporary	8
