= The Faces I've Been =

Compilation album by Jim Croce
- Released: October 1975
- Recorded: RPL Studios Camden, New Jersey, March 26, 1963; Villanova University, April 1963; RPL Studios Camden, New Jersey, July 1966; Columbia Records 30th Street Studios, New York, 1975; The Hit Factory, New York, 1970–1975
- Genre: Rock
- Length: 64:20
- Label: Lifesong
- Producers: Terry Cashman; Tommy West

Jim Croce chronology
Photographs & Memories - His Greatest Hits (1974)	The Faces I've Been (1975)	Time in a Bottle: Jim Croce's Greatest Love Songs (1976)

Professional ratings
Review scores
Source	Rating
AllMusic	2/5 stars
Music Week	2/4 stars

The Faces I've Been is a posthumous double album by Jim Croce, released in 1975.

== Album history ==
The album was designed to show Croce's artistic development, the track listing is chronological and the liner notes described each period of Croce's career.

Side one includes "1961–64 The Spires" and "1964–67 Facets". The Spires are a folk singing group affiliated with the Villanova Singers. The first two tracks are from an album released by Villanova and the third is a live concert recording from the period. The remaining four tracks on side one are from an album Croce recorded in 1966 entitled Facets.

Sides two and three include the periods "1967–70" and "After 1970", respectively. Side four includes "the Raps", or Croce's storytelling in a live setting. Additional examples of this storytelling can be found on his other live releases. The album title comes from a line from Croce's song "The Hard Way Every Time".

The album is the first release on Lifesong Records, a company formed by Croce production team Terry Cashman, Tommy West, and attorney partner Phil Kurnit in 1975.

== Track listing ==
The Faces I've Been
Lifesong Records LS 900 (1975)

Side 1:

1. "This Land Is Your Land" (Woody Guthrie) Ludlow Music, Inc. (BMI) 1:28
2. "Greenback Dollar" (H. Axton; K. Ramsey) Irving Music, Inc. (BMI) 1:28
3. "Pig's Song" (arranged by J. Croce) 0:55
4. "Gunga Din" (music: J. Croce; lyric: Rudyard Kipling) 4:02
5. "Sun Come Up" (J. Croce; R. Croce) 2:03
6. "Big Fat Woman" (Eric Von Schmidt) Minglewood Music, Inc. (ASCAP) 1:56
7. "Charlie Green Play That Slide Trombone" (adapted and arranged by J. Croce) 2:23

Side 2:

1. "Railroads And Riverboats" (J. Croce; I. Croce) 3:09
2. "Railroad Song" (J. Croce; I. Croce) 2:51
3. "The Way We Used To Be" (J. Croce) 2:28
4. "Maybe Tomorrow" (J. Croce) 2:28
5. "Stone Walls" (J. Croce) 2:55
6. "I Remember Mary" (Maury Muehleisen) 2:42
7. "Country Girl" (J. Croce) 1:46

Side 3:

1. "Which Way Are You Goin'" (J. Croce) 2:16
2. "King's Song (J. Croce) 2:00
3. "Mississippi Lady (J. Croce) 3:56
4. "Chain Gang Medley 4:30
  - "Chain Gang" (Sam Cooke) Kags Music Corp. (BMI)
  - "He Don't Love You" (Jerry Butler, Calvin Carter, Curtis Mayfield) Conrad Music, Inc. (BMI)
  - "Searchin'" (Jerry Leiber, Mike Stoller) Unichappell Music, Inc. (BMI)
5. "Old Man River (Jerome Kern, Oscar Hammerstein II) T.B. Harms Co. (ASCAP) 2:25

Side 4:
This side consists of "Raps" which were featured in Jim Croce's concert appearances:

1. Carmella....South Philly 6:00
  - "A Rose And A Baby Ruth" (J.D. Loudermilk) Sony ATV Acuff-Rose (BMI)
  - "Nobody Loves A Fat Girl" (J. Croce) Blendingwell Music, Inc. (ASCAP)
2. "Cars And Dates, Chrome and Clubs" 2:31
  - "Salon And Saloon" (M. Muehleisen) Blendingwell Music, Inc. (ASCAP)
3. "The Chinese 2:24
  - "The Edges Of Your Day" (M. Muehleisen) Blendingwell Music, Inc. (ASCAP)
4. "Trucks And Ups" 2:10
  - "Wear Out The Turnpike" (J. Croce) Blendingwell Music, Inc. (ASCAP)
5. "The Army" (J. Croce) 3:34
  - "Roller Derby Queen" (J. Croce) Blendingwell Music, Inc. (ASCAP)

== Chart positions ==
Year	Chart	Position
1975	Canada Top Albums/CDs (RPM)	83
1975	US Billboard 200	87
