= Workin' at the Car Wash Blues =

1974 single by Jim Croce

Single by Jim Croce

from the album I Got a Name
- B-side: "Thursday"
- Released: May 1974
- Recorded: 1973
- Genre: Folk rock
- Length: 2:32
- Label: ABC
- Songwriter: Jim Croce
- Producers: Terry Cashman, Tommy West

Jim Croce singles chronology
"I'll Have to Say I Love You in a Song" (1974)	"Workin' at the Car Wash Blues" (1974)	"Chain Gang Medley" (1975)

"Workin' at the Car Wash Blues" is a 1974 single written and recorded by Jim Croce. It was the third single released from his album I Got a Name. The song reached a peak of #32 in July 1974, on the Billboard Hot 100, and it is Croce's last Top 40 hit to date. The song was also the fourth single released, including the Christmas-themed release "It Doesn't Have To Be That Way", after Croce's death in September 1973.

== Content ==
Croce described this song as having a "funky street feel". During a performance, he explained the song as "a story about a guy who thinks he thinks he should be ruling the universe somewhere, but he is really working at a car wash". Croce explained that he came up with the idea for the song while in the military at Fort Jackson, running telephone cables on poles and thinking he should be doing something else. While on top of the pole, Croce thought about everyone in the same situation thinking they should be doing another "gig" and have a different job.

In the song, a man has just been released from a 90-day prison sentence for "non-support", and believing himself to be "an undiscovered Howard Hughes" and "a genius", tries to smooth-talk his way into an executive position. Every company the man tries turns him down, stating they have no openings, which forces him to accept menial work at a car wash. While begrudgingly doing his duties, the man fantasizes about the executive life, and imagines himself sitting in an air-conditioned office (as compared to the reality of working "at this indoor Niagara Falls"), smoking cigars, drinking martinis, appearing in high society magazines, and making sexual remarks at his secretary.

The original title of the song was "I got them steadily depressing, low down, mind-messing, working at the car wash blues" (as sung in the song); however, it was shortened before the single's release.

== Reception ==
Cash Box said that "this cute composition...will naturally be another smash for old Croce fans and new" and that "the late singer -songwriter's ability to weave a lyric into his music is quite in evidence here and the result is a totally entertaining experience." Record World said it was Croce's "first local color story-song since 'Leroy Brown'" and described it as a "saga of an undiscovered Howard Hughes."

== B-side ==
The flip side of the single features the song "Thursday".

== Live performances ==
A live version of the song was released on his album Have You Heard: Jim Croce Live which includes an introduction to the song where he explains its origin.

== Track listing ==
7" Single (ABC-11447)

1. "Workin' At The Car Wash Blues" - 2:30
2. "Thursday" - 2:20

== Chart performance ==
=== Weekly charts ===
==== Jim Croce ====
Chart (1974)	Peak position
US Billboard Hot 100	32
U.S. Billboard Adult Contemporary	9
U.S. Cash Box Top 100	20
Canada Top Singles (RPM)	28
Canadian RPM Adult Contemporary	2

==== Tony Booth ====
Chart (1974)	Peak position
U.S. Billboard Country Singles	27
Canadian RPM Country Singles	18

=== Year-end charts ===
Chart (1974)	Rank
Canada RPM Top Singles	167
U.S. (Joel Whitburn's Pop Annual)	204

== Covers ==
- The song "Workin' at the Car Wash Blues" was covered by American country singer Tony Booth in 1974, the same year as Croce's single. It was also covered by Jerry Reed on his tribute album Jerry Reed Sings Jim Croce.
- Gonzo the Great performed the song with some chickens on an episode of The Muppet Show.
- The Dutch-Swedish singer-songwriter Cornelis Vreeswijk released a Dutch version titled "Autowasserij blues" in 1976.
