= List of Canadian number-one albums of 1975 =

This article lists the Canadian number-one albums of 1975. The chart was compiled and published by RPM every Saturday.

The top position (December 28, 1974, Vol. 22, No. 19) preceding January 11, 1975 (Vol. 24, No. 15) was Jim Croce's Photographs & Memories. Elton John's Captain Fantastic and the Brown Dirt Cowboy entered the chart at #1. Elton John held the top position in the albums and singles charts simultaneously on January 11 – February 1.

(Entries with dates marked thus* are not presently on record at Library and Archives Canada and were inferred from the following week's listing. The issue that should have been published on October 11 is dated October 13. There were no publications from November 8 through December 6. The November 1 chart, Vol. 24, No. 9, is followed by December 13's chart, Vol. 24, No. 10-11-12. No "last week" positions were specified on this issue's chart, indicating that the charting process was restarted.)

Issue date	Album	Artist
January 4	Photographs & Memories	Jim Croce
January 11	Elton John's Greatest Hits	Elton John
January 18	Elton John's Greatest Hits	Elton John
January 25	Elton John's Greatest Hits	Elton John
February 1	Elton John's Greatest Hits	Elton John
February 8*	Elton John's Greatest Hits	Elton John
February 15	Elton John's Greatest Hits	Elton John
February 22	Elton John's Greatest Hits	Elton John
March 1	Elton John's Greatest Hits	Elton John
March 8	Elton John's Greatest Hits	Elton John
March 15	Elton John's Greatest Hits	Elton John
March 22	Elton John's Greatest Hits	Elton John
March 29	Blood on the Tracks	Bob Dylan
April 4	Blood on the Tracks	Bob Dylan
April 12	Physical Graffiti	Led Zeppelin
April 19	Physical Graffiti	Led Zeppelin
April 26	Physical Graffiti	Led Zeppelin
May 3	Physical Graffiti	Led Zeppelin
May 10	Physical Graffiti	Led Zeppelin
May 17	An Evening with John Denver	John Denver
May 24	An Evening with John Denver	John Denver
May 31	Captain Fantastic and the Brown Dirt Cowboy	Elton John
June 7	Captain Fantastic and the Brown Dirt Cowboy	Elton John
June 14	Captain Fantastic and the Brown Dirt Cowboy	Elton John
June 21	Captain Fantastic and the Brown Dirt Cowboy	Elton John
June 28	Captain Fantastic and the Brown Dirt Cowboy	Elton John
July 5	Captain Fantastic and the Brown Dirt Cowboy	Elton John
July 12	Captain Fantastic and the Brown Dirt Cowboy	Elton John
July 19	Captain Fantastic and the Brown Dirt Cowboy	Elton John
July 26	Venus and Mars	Wings
August 2	Captain Fantastic and the Brown Dirt Cowboy	Elton John
August 9	Captain Fantastic and the Brown Dirt Cowboy	Elton John
August 16	Captain Fantastic and the Brown Dirt Cowboy	Elton John
August 23	Captain Fantastic and the Brown Dirt Cowboy	Elton John
August 30	Captain Fantastic and the Brown Dirt Cowboy	Elton John
September 6	Captain Fantastic and the Brown Dirt Cowboy	Elton John
September 13	Venus and Mars	Wings
September 20	Fandango!	ZZ Top
September 27	Fandango!	ZZ Top
October 4	Four Wheel Drive	Bachman-Turner Overdrive
October 13	Greatest Hits	Cat Stevens
October 18	Four Wheel Drive	Bachman-Turner Overdrive
October 25	Windsong	John Denver
November 1	Windsong	John Denver
November 8	Windsong	John Denver
November 15	Windsong	John Denver
November 22	Windsong	John Denver
November 29	Windsong	John Denver
December 6	Windsong	John Denver
December 13	Windsong	John Denver
December 20	Windsong	John Denver
December 25	Rock of the Westies	Elton John

== See also ==
- 1975 in music
- RPM number-one hits of 1975
