= It Doesn't Have to Be That Way =

Single by Jim Croce

from the album Life and Times
- B-side: "Roller Derby Queen"
- Released: December 1973
- Genre: Folk rock, christmas music
- Length: 2:31
- Label: ABC
- Songwriter: Jim Croce
- Producers: Terry Cashman, Tommy West

Jim Croce singles chronology
"Time in a Bottle" (1973)	"It Doesn't Have to Be That Way" (1973)	"I'll Have to Say I Love You in a Song" (1974)

"It Doesn't Have to Be That Way" is a song written and recorded by Jim Croce for his 1973 album Life and Times. Originally released early that year as the B-side of the "One Less Set of Footsteps" single, the song was reissued that December as the third and final single from the album as well as Croce's second posthumously-released single. It reached a peak of #64 on the Billboard Hot 100, spending five weeks on the chart.

Because of its Christmas setting and the wintery images associated with its lyrics, the song is often played during the holiday season.

== Content ==
In the song, the narrator reveals himself to be a man who has recently ended a relationship. As the holiday season approaches, the Christmas atmosphere in his town is evident nearly everywhere, including such things as falling snow, "Christmas lights," "the corner Santa Claus," "sidewalk bands," "icy windowpanes," tinsel, and caroling choirs. As the narrator walks down the "windy winter avenue" and encounters these holiday festivities, he admits that he wishes he and his lover could reunite. Instead of encouraging the holiday spirit, the narrator hints that these elements remind him of past Christmases with his lover, only making him sad that they are no longer together. The narrator notes that these once cheerful things no longer "seem the same," but that it is his sadness over their relationship's end that has caused such a disconnect, and that the festivities themselves are "not to blame." However, even as the narrator encounters these sad reminders, he finds room for optimism, suggesting that "it doesn't have to be that way," and that his relationship with his lover could "easily" be rekindled if they attempted to do so. The narrator suggests that if his lover could only see him as a "lonely man" walking down the street, that she would "understand" his sadness, and agree to reunite. Finally, the narrator resolves to visit his lover's house "today," so that they can "get it together tonight," overcoming their problems to begin their relationship once more. The narrator ends the chorus by noting that his life can only be better with his lover - indeed, "it's only right."

== Personnel ==
According to liner notes of the album

- Jim Croce – lead vocals, acoustic rhythm guitar
- Maury Muehleisen – acoustic lead guitar
- Joe Macho – bass guitar
- Gary Chester – drums

== Reception ==
Billboard stated that "Croce's tender interpretation matches the lost love, I hope I can regain it feel" of the song. Cash Box said that "this soft, sensitive beauty is a lot more than" a Christmas love song.

== Live performances ==
A live version of the song was released on his album Jim Croce Live: The Final Tour.

== Covers ==
The Ventures covered the song on The Ventures Play the Jim Croce Songbook.

== Track listing ==
7" Single (ABC-11413)

1. "It Doesn't Have To Be That Way " - 2:31
2. "Roller Derby Queen" - 2:28

== Chart performance ==
Chart (1973–1974)	Peak position
US Billboard Hot 100	64
U.S. Cash Box Top 100	47
Canada Top Singles (RPM)	47
Canadian RPM Adult Contemporary	53
