= The Chevrons =

American pop group

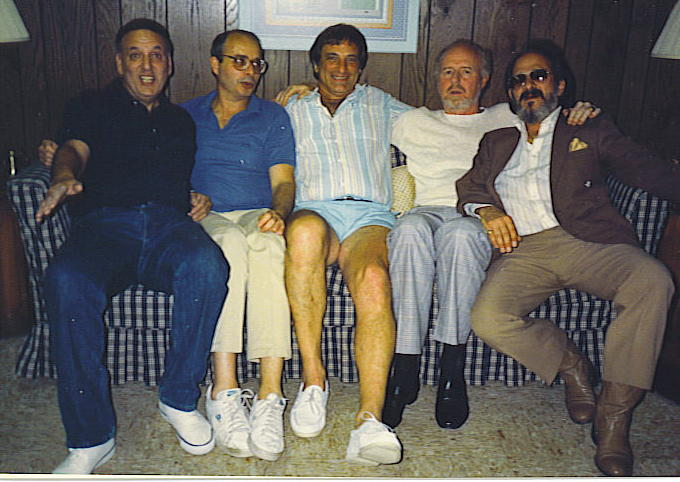
The Chevrons On The Don K Reed CBS FM Radio Show 1988

The Chevrons were an American pop group who recorded the hit record "Lullabye" in 1960. The band featured lead singer Terry Cashman, best known for his baseball songs, notably "Talkin' Baseball", then known by his born name, Dennis Minogue. The group disbanded when John "Marty" Trautman, co-founder of the group, was drafted by the U.S. Army on December 11, 1962.

The Chevrons formed in the Inwood Section of upper Manhattan in 1958. The group consisted of tenor lead singer Dennis Minogue (Cashman), lead baritone/baritone John "Marty" Trautman, second tenor Gary Giordan, first tenor Frank Williams, and bass, Raul Al Conde. Conde was formerly a member of The Spirals from Washington Heights, New York, who recorded "Little Girl" and "School Bells" c. 1958 for George Goldner's End Record Label.

The Chevrons' first recording on Bob Shad's Brent label was "That Comes With Love" b/w "Don't Be Heartless", followed by "Lullabye" b/w "Day After Forever". The success of "Lullabye" landed them an appearance on Dick Clark's American Bandstand on June 24, 1960. "Lullabye" was followed by an album on Time Records called Sing-Along Rock N' Roll, which consisted of covers of twenty-six hit songs arranged in sing-a-long format. Several songs - including "Little Star", "Come Go With Me" and "Little Darlin'" - were released off the album as singles.

Marty Trautman's sister Marion Trautman worked at an advertising company as creative producer. In 1960 she got the Chevrons to do a TV commercial for one of the companies clients, as a Barbershop Quartet, for a hair tonic product called (Dandy Hair Tonic) which was shown on National Television CBS which was one of the sponsored commercials for The Million Dollar Movie at the time.

When The Chevrons disbanded, Conde went on to form another group called The Holidays (c. 1961), recording two songs he had written for the group,"New Orleans" and "Life" on the Sabina label, owned and produced by The Belmonts.

In 1967, Dennis Minogue aka Terry Cashman teamed up with Gene Pistilli and Tommy West on Paramount Records to form the pop-folk group Cashman, Pistilli and West. Their successful debut album, Bound to Happen (1967) included the Cashman and Pistilli composition "Sunday Will Never Be the Same", a summer 1967 hit for Spanky and Our Gang.

Cashman and West later recorded the album Tale of Two Cities (American City Suite) on Dunhill records, and produced several hits for Jim Croce.

Terry Cashman was honored at the Baseball Hall Of Fame for his song "Talkin' Baseball" (Willie, Mickey and the Duke) on July 23, 2011.

The Chevrons reunited in July 1988, to appear as guests on the "Doo-Wop Shop" hosted by Don K. Reed Show on WCBS-FM. In 1999, The Wop Ding A Ling collection of New York doo-wop from the late 1950s and 1960s included "Lullabye" and "Don't Be Heartless".

On December 25, 2011, co-founder John "Marty" Trautman (Johnny '56) died at his home in Coppell, Texas, a suburb of Dallas. His final professional singing gig was earlier that month.

Raul (Al) Conde contributed a short story written about his real-life experiences growing up as a kid in Washington Heights NYC during the 1940s, 1950s, and 1960s to Heightsmemories.com. Boris Riabov, a documentary filmmaker, happened to read the essay and asked Al Conde if he could make a short documentary based on his true life story. The documentary was made and it is called (Through A Kids Eyes) Part 1, Part 2 Which can be watched on YouTube.com. An edited version was taken from the documentary, also was made called Recalling The RKO Coliseum In Washington Heights NYC seen on YouTube.com.
