= I'll Have to Say I Love You in a Song =

Single by Jim Croce

from the album I Got a Name
- B-side: "Salon and Saloon"
- Released: March 1974
- Recorded: June 6, 1973
- Genre: Country folk; folk rock; soft rock
- Length: 2:33
- Label: ABC Records
- Songwriter: Jim Croce
- Producers: Terry Cashman, Tommy West

Jim Croce singles chronology
"It Doesn't Have to Be That Way" (1973)	"I'll Have to Say I Love You in a Song" (1974)	"Workin' at the Car Wash Blues" (1974)

"I'll Have to Say I Love You in a Song" is the title of a posthumously released single by the American singer-songwriter Jim Croce. The song was written by Croce and was originally released on his album I Got a Name.

"I'll Have to Say I Love You in a Song" entered the Billboard Hot 100 chart at position No. 73 in March 1974. It peaked at No. 9 in April 1974, becoming his fifth and final top 10 hit. The song also went to No. 1 on the Billboard Adult Contemporary chart and reached No. 68 on the Billboard Country chart, Croce's only song to chart there.

"I'll Have to Say I Love You in a Song" is noted for the use of backup singers, as well as a string section, that plays a counterpoint melody during the concluding instrumental.

== Background ==
Croce was killed in a small-plane crash in September 1973, the same week that a 45 rpm single, the title cut from his studio album I Got a Name was released. After the delayed release of a song from his previous album ("Time in a Bottle") in late 1973, "I'll Have to Say I Love You in a Song" was chosen as the second single released from his final studio album.

Croce wrote the song in early 1973 when he arrived home and got into a disagreement with his wife, Ingrid. Instead of arguing with her, Ingrid stated that Croce "went downstairs, and he started to play like he always did when he wrote ... the next morning, he came up early in the morning and sang it to me."

Ingrid Croce wrote an autobiographical cookbook, Thyme in a Bottle, in which she includes interesting anecdotes about Jim. She wrote the following about "I'll Have To Say 'I Love You' in a Song":

One weekend, after being on the road for many months, Jim got a chance to come home to relax with his family. We settled in to enjoy our time alone together. Though Jim was expecting company the next day, avoiding confrontation he never told me that we were to be joined by an entire film crew! The next morning, 15 people from Acorn Productions descended upon our house to record a promotional film of Jim Croce at Home on the Farm. I prepared breakfast, lunch and dinner for the whole film crew and after the group left, I questioned Jim about our finances. After a year and a half of his working so very hard on the road, we were barely making ends meet, but Jim wouldn't talk about it. He hated questions as much as he hated confrontation, especially about money. He stormed out of our bedroom and went down to the kitchen table to brood. The next morning he woke me gently by singing his new song. "Every time I tried to tell you the words just came out wrong. So I'll have to say 'I love you' in a song."

== Reception ==
Billboard described Croce's vocal performance as "strong" and also praised the song's production. Cash Box called it a "tender, beautiful love ballad."

== Covers ==
- Cilla Black covered this song on her 1974 album In My Life.
- Clint Black covered it for his 2007 album The Love Songs.
- Lane Brody covered it on Jim Croce: A Nashville Tribute
- The Ventures covered it on The Ventures Play the Jim Croce Songbook
- Jerry Reed covered it on Jerry Reed Sings Jim Croce
- Bonnie Koloc covered it on Bonnie Koloc at Her Best
- Andy Williams covered it on You Lay So Easy on My Mind
- Cleo Laine covered it on Gonna Get Through
- Mary Travers covered it on Circles
- Johnny Lee covered it on Hey Bartender
- Mary Hopkin released a cover of the song on her 2008 album Recollections.
- The Jay Dyall Project covered it, releasing it in 2012 as an online stand-alone single.
- Miranda Lambert released a cover of the song on her 2026 solo album Crisco.

== In popular culture ==
Jamie Lee Curtis and Jake Johnson sing along to Jim Croce's recording while preparing Thanksgiving dinner in the "Parents" episode (S2-E8) of the Fox TV sitcom New Girl.

== Track listing ==
7" single (ABC-11424)

1. "I'll Have to Say I Love You in a Song" (Jim Croce) 2:30
2. "Salon And Saloon" (Maury Muehleisen) 2:30

== Chart performance ==
=== Weekly charts ===
Chart (1974)	Peak position
Australian Top 100 Singles	100
Canada Top Singles (RPM)	4
Netherlands Dutch Top 40	28
New Zealand (Listener)	12
US Billboard Hot 100	9
US Adult Contemporary (Billboard)	1
US Hot Country Songs (Billboard)	68
US Cash Box Top 100	7

=== Year-end charts ===
Chart (1974)	Rank
Canadian RPM Top Singles	75
US Billboard Hot 100	85
US Cash Box Top 100	88
