= Jim Croce Live: The Final Tour =

Live album by Jim Croce
- Released: 1989
- Recorded: 1973
- Genre: Folk rock
- Length: 54:07
- Label: Saja Records

Jim Croce chronology
Down the Highway (1980)	Jim Croce Live: The Final Tour (1989)	Home Recordings: Americana (2003)

Professional ratings
Review scores
Source	Rating
Allmusic	link

Jim Croce Live: The Final Tour is a live album by American singer-songwriter Jim Croce, originally released in 1989, roughly 16 years after his untimely death at age 30 in a plane crash on September 20, 1973. Recorded on the 1973 tour, the album features in-concert performances of some of Croce's biggest hits, peppered with stories and banter between songs, adding the inspiration for some of them. Two other songs, "Ball of Kerrymuir" and "Shopping for Clothes," were never released on Croce's studio albums. This live album has been re-released several times.

== Track listing ==
All tracks are written by Jim Croce, except where noted

No.	Title	Writer(s)	Length
1.	"Operator (That's Not the Way It Feels)"		4:10
2.	"Roller Derby Queen" (Dialogue)		5:28
3.	"Roller Derby Queen"	adapted by Jim Croce	2:58
4.	"Next Time, This Time"		3:46
5.	"Trucker Dialogue"		7:16
6.	"Speedball Tucker"		2:22
7.	"New York's Not My Home"		2:57
8.	"Hard Time Losin' Man"		2:29
9.	"Ball of Kirriemuir" (Dialogue)		2:48
10.	"Ball of Kirriemuir"	Robert Burns	3:33
11.	"You Don't Mess Around with Jim"		3:14
12.	"It Doesn't Have to Be That Way"		2:55
13.	"Careful Man" (Dialogue)		2:08
14.	"Careful Man"		1:58
15.	"Shopping For Clothes"	Jerry Leiber, Mike Stoller	2:33
16.	"These Dreams"		3:52

== Personnel ==
- Jim Croce – guitar, vocals
- Maury Muehleisen – guitar, vocals
