= I Got a Name =

Studio album by Jim Croce
- Released: December 1973
- Recorded: 1973
- Studios: Hit Factory, New York City
- Genre: Folk rock
- Length: 30:57
- Labels: ABC (USA); Vertigo (UK)
- Producers: Terry Cashman, Tommy West

Jim Croce chronology
Life & Times (1973)	I Got a Name (1973)	Photographs & Memories (1974)

Singles from I Got a Name
- 1. "I Got a Name / "Alabama Rain"" Released: September 1973; 2. "I'll Have to Say I Love You in a Song" / "Salon and Saloon" Released: March 1974; 3. "Workin' at the Car Wash Blues" / "Thursday" Released: June 1974

Professional ratings
Review scores
Source	Rating
AllMusic	3.5/5 stars
Christgau's Record Guide	C+
Rolling Stone	(favorable)

I Got a Name is the fifth and final studio album and first posthumous release by American singer-songwriter Jim Croce, released in December 1973. It features the ballad "I'll Have to Say I Love You in a Song", which reached number 9 on the US singles chart, and the ballad "Salon and Saloon", the last song Croce recorded in his lifetime. The song, which is noted for its sparse piano-only vocal backing, was written by his guitarist and friend Maury Muehleisen and was included on the album as a gift to the writer.

This would be Croce's final album, as he died in a plane crash on September 20, 1973.

"I Got a Name" was used as the theme for the films The Last American Hero and Invincible. It was a posthumous hit for Croce, reaching number 10 on the US singles chart.

The album reached number 2 on the US charts behind his earlier album You Don't Mess Around with Jim in first place.

== Track listing ==
All tracks are written by Jim Croce, unless stated otherwise:

No.	Title	Writer(s)	Length
1.	"I Got a Name"	Charles Fox, Norman Gimbel	3:11
2.	"Lover's Cross"		3:04
3.	"Five Short Minutes"		3:29
4.	"Age"	Jim Croce, Ingrid Croce	3:46
5.	"Workin' at the Car Wash Blues"		2:32
6.	"I'll Have to Say I Love You in a Song"		2:34
7.	"Salon and Saloon"	Maury Muehleisen	2:31
8.	"Thursday"	Sal Joseph	2:28
9.	"Top Hat Bar and Grille"		2:47
10.	"Recently"		2:34
11.	"The Hard Way Every Time"		2:29

== Personnel ==
Credits taken from album's liner notes

- Jim Croce – rhythm guitar on tracks 2 to 6 and 8 to 11, lead vocals, backing vocals on tracks 1, 4, and 8

Additional musicians

- Leroy Brown – backing vocals on "Five Short Minutes"
- Gary Chester – drums on "I'll Have to Say I Love You in a Song"
- George Devens – percussion on tracks 1, 4, 6, and 9
- Steve Gadd – drums on tracks 3, 5, and 11
- Ellie Greenwich – backing vocals on "Top Hat Bar and Grille"
- Michael Kamen – ARP synthesizer and oboe on "The Hard Way Every Time"; ARP tuba synthesizer on "Workin' at the Car Wash Blues"
- Joe Macho – bass on tracks 1, 2, 4, 6, and 8 to 10
- Rick Marotta – drums on tracks 1, 2, 8, 9, percussion on track 10
- Bobby Matos – percussion on tracks 3, 5, and 10
- Terence P. Minogue – strings, backing vocals on "The Hard Way Every Time"
- Maury Muehleisen – lead acoustic guitar on tracks 1, 2, 5, 6, and 8 to 11, lead electric guitar on 4 and 9, backing vocals on 1, 5, and 8
- Henry Gross – lead and rhythm electric guitar on "Five Short Minutes", slide guitar on "Workin' at the Car Wash Blues"
- Marty Nelson – backing vocals on tracks 3, 6, and 10
- Alan Rolnick – backing vocals on "I'll Have To Say I Love You In A Song"
- Tasha Thomas – backing vocals on "Five Short Minutes" and "Top Hat Bar And Grille"
- Tommy West – piano on tracks 1, 3, 7, 9, and 11, electric piano on track 6, keyboards on tracks 4, 8, and 10, rhythm guitar on tracks 1 and 4, and backing vocals on tracks 1, 3, 5, 6, 8, 9, and 11
- Stu Woods – bass on tracks 3, 5, and 11

== Chart positions ==
=== Weekly charts ===
Year	Chart	Peak position
1974	Canada Top Albums/CDs (RPM)	2
1974	US Billboard 200	2

=== Year-end charts ===
Chart (1974)	Position
Canada RPM Top 100 Albums	27
US Billboard 200	16

Singles

Year	Single	Chart	Position
1973	"I Got a Name"	Adult Contemporary	4
1973	"I Got a Name"	Pop Singles	10
1974	"I'll Have to Say I Love You in a Song"	Adult Contemporary	1
1974	"I'll Have to Say I Love You in a Song"	Pop Singles	9
1974	"I'll Have to Say I Love You in a Song"	Country	68
1974	"Workin' at the Car Wash Blues"	Adult Contemporary	9
1974	"Workin' at the Car Wash Blues"	Pop Singles	32

=== Certifications ===
Country	Certifications
United States	Gold
