= The Last American Hero =

1973 film by Lamont Johnson

- DVD cover
- Directed by: Lamont Johnson
- Written by: William Roberts; William Kerby
- Based on: "The Last American Hero Is Junior Johnson. Yes!" by Tom Wolfe
- Produced by: William Roberts; John Cutts
- Starring: Jeff Bridges; Valerie Perrine; Geraldine Fitzgerald
- Cinematography: George Silano
- Edited by: Tom Rolf; Robbe Roberts
- Music by: Charles Fox
- Distributed by: 20th Century-Fox
- Release date: July 27, 1973
- Running time: 95 minutes
- Country: United States
- Language: English
- Budget: $2 million
- Box office: $1 million (US/Canada)

The Last American Hero (also known as Hard Driver) is a 1973 American sports drama film based on the true story of NASCAR driver Junior Johnson. Directed by Lamont Johnson (no relation), the film stars Jeff Bridges as Junior Jackson, a character based on Johnson. It is based on Tom Wolfe's essay "The Last American Hero Is Junior Johnson. Yes!", which was first published in Esquire magazine in March 1965 and included in his debut collection of essays, The Kandy-Kolored Tangerine-Flake Streamline Baby, later that year.

== Plot ==
Junior Jackson is a restless young man who finds himself the family breadwinner when his father, a career moonshiner, is arrested and sentenced to one-year imprisonment.

Junior is an outstanding driver, so he enters a demolition derby promoted by Hackel, the owner of the local racing track, hoping to win the prize money. Hackel is a cheapskate, but he is sufficiently impressed by Junior's driving skills and attitude (he modified his vehicle with a piece of railroad iron that he rammed into the other cars) that he allows Junior to enter a stock-car undercard race the next week. Junior does well in it and subsequent higher level races, which inspires him to enter the main race at the next top tier event.

Junior is given some valuable advice on how to enter by Marge, a secretary to the race organizer who has a soft spot for Junior, and when he performs well during the trial laps his entry is assured. During the race Junior does very well for a while, but eventually his overtaxed engine blows and Junior has to retire in frustration. Since the prize money at that level of racing is excellent, Junior decides that is the career for him.

However stock car racing is expensive—Junior needs to buy his racing car and pay for its upkeep, and also provide for his brother, Wayne, and three friends who serve as his pit crew and travel companions. Burton Colt, the owner of a team that has not won any races lately, offers Junior a chance to drive for him, but the financial terms are stacked against Junior, and Colt insists that Junior will have to use the team's crew. Junior declines the offer. To raise money he spends his nights transporting moonshine, which his father does not approve of, knowing it will inevitably land his son in prison as it did him. Junior's mother, meanwhile, does not want him to race because she thinks it's too dangerous a pursuit. A lesser complication for Junior to deal with is that although Marge is very fond of him, she is also attracted to other top drivers on the stock car circuit, including Kyle Kingman, Junior's racing and now romantic rival.

== Cast ==
- Jeff Bridges as Elroy Jackson Jr.
- Valerie Perrine as Marge
- Geraldine Fitzgerald as Mrs. Jackson
- Ned Beatty as Hackel
- Gary Busey as Wayne Jackson
- Art Lund as Elroy Jackson Sr.
- Ed Lauter as Burton Colt
- William Smith as Kyle Kingman
- Gregory Walcott as Morley
- Tom Ligon as Lamar
- Ernie Orsatti Jr. as Davie Baer
- Erica Hagen as Trina
- Jimmy Murphy as "Spud"
- Lane Smith as Rick Penny

== Reception and legacy ==
The film was favorably reviewed by Pauline Kael in The New Yorker, even though The New Yorker had a long-standing feud with Wolfe. Kael wrote of the film that it is a movie that tells you that to win "you give up everything you care about except winning." She expanded by describing the story as "not of a man who fights for his independence but of a man who is smart enough not to sell himself too cheap."

It has an 71% rating on Rotten Tomatoes.

The film's theme song, "I Got a Name", sung by Jim Croce, was released in September 1973 as a single, peaking at No. 10 on the Billboard Hot 100 and No. 4 on its Easy Listening chart.

== Home media ==
The film was released on DVD in 2006 with both full and widescreen presentations alongside its theatrical trailer; as of 2023, it is also available for streaming.

== See also ==
- I Got a Name — the 1973 Jim Croce album featuring the film's theme song
- New Journalism — a literary movement mixing facts with elements of fiction, like the 1965 source material written by Wolfe
