= Jim & Ingrid Croce =

1969 studio album by Jim Croce

Studio album by Jim Croce and Ingrid Croce
- Released: September 1969
- Recorded: August 3 – September 12, 1968
- Genre: Folk
- Length: 27:42
- Label: Capitol
- Producers: Terry Cashman, Gene Pistilli, Tommy West

Jim Croce chronology
Facets (1966)	Jim & Ingrid Croce (1969)	You Don't Mess Around with Jim (1972)

Professional ratings
Review scores
Source	Rating
AllMusic	2/5 stars

Jim & Ingrid Croce is the second studio album by American singer-songwriter Jim Croce and American author Ingrid Croce, the only one the married couple released as a duo. It was originally released in September 1969, and has been subsequently re-released with alternate titles such as Bombs over Puerto Rico, Another Day, Another Town and Approaching Day.

The album was released in September 1969, despite being recorded 12 months earlier. In the interim, the couple recorded 21 songs as a demonstration tape to audition for a children's TV show in Boston. They did not get the job; these demo tapes were not released until 2004 when seven tracks were selected to be included with the 2004 CD release of the 1966 album Facets. In the CD liner notes, Ingrid refers to this collection of songs as "Jim and Ingrid Croce Too".

== Track listing ==
=== Original release (1969) ===
All tracks are written by Jim and Ingrid Croce, except where noted.

No.	Title	Writer(s)	Length
1.	"Age"		2:15
2.	"Spin, Spin, Spin"		2:46
3.	"I Am Who I Am"		2:31
4.	"What Do People Do"		1:55
5.	"Another Day, Another Town"	Jim Croce	2:31
6.	"Vespers"		1:58
7.	"Big Wheel"	Jim Croce	1:52
8.	"Just Another Day"		2:38
9.	"The Next Man That I Marry"	Gene Pistilli, Terry Cashman, Tommy West	3:05
10.	"What the Hell"	Pistilli, Cashman, West	3:12
11.	"The Man That Is Me"		2:53

=== Re-release (1974) ===
The album was re-released on Capitol Records as Jim & Ingrid Croce: Another Day, Another Town, with two songs omitted and the tracks rearranged in the following order:

No.	Title	Writer(s)	Length
1.	"Another Day, Another Town"	Jim Croce	2:27
2.	"Vespers"		2:00
3.	"Big Wheel"	Jim Croce	1:50
4.	"Age"		2:12
5.	"What Do People Do"		1:51
6.	"Just Another Day"		2:35
7.	"What the Hell"	Pistilli, Cashman, West	3:07
8.	"The Man That Is Me"		2:50
9.	"Spin, Spin, Spin"		2:43

== Personnel ==
- Jim Croce – 12-string guitar, vocals
- Ingrid Croce – vocals
- Gary Chester – drums
- Harry Katzman – violin
- Ann Minogue – triangle
- Gene Pistilli – 6-string guitar, keyboards
- John Stockfish – bass
- Eric Weissberg – mandolin
- Dick Weissman – banjo
- Tommy West – 6-string guitar, keyboards, backing vocals

== Production ==
- Producers: Terry Cashman, Gene Pistilli, Tommy West
