= I Got a Name (song) =

Single by Jim Croce

from the album I Got a Name
- B-side: "Alabama Rain"
- Released: September 21, 1973
- Genre: Folk rock
- Length: 3:11
- Label: ABC
- Songwriters: Charles Fox, Norman Gimbel
- Producers: Terry Cashman, Tommy West

Jim Croce singles chronology
"Bad, Bad Leroy Brown" (1973)	"I Got a Name" (1973)	"Time in a Bottle" (1973)

"I Got a Name" is a 1973 single recorded by Jim Croce with lyrics by Norman Gimbel and music by Charles Fox. It was the first single from his album of the same title and also Croce's first posthumous single, released the day after his death in a plane crash on September 20, 1973. The song reached a peak of No. 10 on the Billboard Hot 100, spending 17 weeks on the chart. It also hit No. 3 on the Cash Box Top 100.

While the single was released in September 1973, it was first heard as the theme song for the movie The Last American Hero, released in July 1973. The song was later featured in the movies The Ice Storm, Invincible, Django Unchained, Logan and The Lego Ninjago Movie.

== Background ==
Croce composed most of his own material, but he did not write "I Got A Name." In an interview with Billboard writer Norman Gimbel, it was revealed that Croce chose to record the song "because his father had a dream for him but had died before his son's first success."

== Content ==
The song features a narrator who is proud of who he is and where he is going in life, undeterred by the naysaying of others. The narrator begins by declaring that like any plant or animal, he has a name of which he can be proud. However, the narrator acknowledges that not all people take pride in who they are in such a way: for instance, he carries his name with him "like my daddy did," but the narrator, choosing to handle life differently, is "living the dream that he kept hid." The narrator, unlike his father, is able to have a proud connection with his name, and live out the dreams that his father was unable to accomplish in life.

In the second verse, the narrator goes on to note that like the wind, birds, or even crying babies, he has a song to sing. Much like he does with his name, the narrator holds his song up as a proud part of his identity, and resolves to sing it no matter what. Even if singing "gets me nowhere," by declaring his identity and worth to the world, the narrator can go to "nowhere" proudly.

In the final verse, the narrator declares that he will go forward in life "free," acknowledging that he will forever thus be a "fool." However, the narrator happily chooses this path of foolish freedom, because moving through life this way can only help him achieve his "dream." This dream is clearly as much a part of his identity as his name or the song he sings, and the narrator holds it up just as proudly to others. He then notes that while others may "change their minds" about him and his dream, their naysaying can never change his identity. Even so, the narrator is willing to "share" his dream with others, and announces that if anyone else is "going my way"—i.e. they believe in his dream as well—then he will go forward in life along with them.

However, the culmination of the narrator's beliefs and pride in his identity is really in the chorus, as he declares that no matter what, he is joyfully "moving" and "rolling" himself "down the highway" of life. All in all, as the narrator moves forward in life, carrying his name, song, and dream as part of him, his biggest goal is to simply not focus on the past, but look to the present and future instead. The narrator ends by sharing his hope that he can live each day to the fullest, "moving ahead so life won't pass me by."

== Reception ==
In 1973, Billboard wrote, "The song is bigger and more grandiose in lyric and melody content than Croce's usual funky material which makes interesting contrast." They also listed the song as a top single pick. Cash Box said that Croce "performs a la 'Operator'-but with a bit more funk during the bridges." Record World said that the "song fits Croce's style to a tee and is a fine tribute to his talent." Irvine Herald reviewer Willie Freckleton called it "a very fine epitaph to a big, big talent who died without having the recognition he richly deserved."

== Live performances ==
Croce performed the song live on an episode of The Midnight Special in 1973, and on the July 19, 1973 episode of NBC's The Helen Reddy Show. There is at least one other known live video recorded performance of "I Got A Name," at Royce Hall, UCLA Campus, Los Angeles, California in August 1973.

== Chart performance ==
=== Weekly charts ===
Chart (1973–74)	Peak position
Australian KMR	49
Canadian RPM Top Singles	8
Canadian RPM Adult Contemporary	5
Netherlands	36
U.S. Billboard Hot 100	10
U.S. Billboard Easy Listening	4
U.S. Cash Box Top 100	3

=== Year-end charts ===
Chart (1973)	Rank
Canada RPM Top Singles	102
U.S. Cash Box	68
U.S. (Joel Whitburn's Pop Annual)	92

Chart (1974)	Rank
U.S. Cash Box	78

== Track listing ==
7" Single (ABC-11389)

1. "I Got a Name" - 3:09
2. "Alabama Rain" - 2:14

== Cover versions ==
- Joe Dassin (France) covered the song (in french : Pourquoi pas moi ?) on the album "13 chansons nouvelles" in 1973.
- Sammy Kershaw covered the song on the compilation album Jim Croce: A Nashville Tribute in 1997.
- Jerry Reed covered the song on his tribute album to Jim Croce Jerry Reed Sings Jim Croce.
- Helen Reddy covered it on her 1974 album Love Song for Jeffrey.
- Lena Horne recorded the song on her albums Lena & Michel (RCA Victor, 1975) with Michel Legrand and on Lena Horne: The Lady and Her Music (Qwest, 1981).
- Rex Allen Jr. recorded the song on his album Brand New in 1978.
- Lori Lieberman covered it on her album Piece of Time.
- German singer/songwriter Dirk Darmstaedter covered it on the 2002 LP This Road Doesn't Lead to my House Anymore.
- Australian singer Troy Cassar-Daley covered the song on his album Borrowed & Blue in 2004.
- The Annie Moses Band covered the song on their 2012 album Pilgrims & Prodigals
- Cher performed the song live on The Sonny and Cher Comedy Hour in 1976.

== In film and television ==
The song was used at the start and end of The Last American Hero, a 1973 film starring Jeff Bridges.

The song was used at the start of the end credits for the 1974 movie "Thunderbolt and Lightfoot", starring Clint Eastwood and Jeff Bridges.

The song was performed by Lena Horne on Episode 11 of Season 1 of The Muppet Show.

The song was featured in a TV commercial for Western Airlines, in 1987, just before the carrier merged with Delta Air Lines; it had the tag line, "Western Airlines: We have a name to live up to."

In 1995, the song was used as the theme for the character of Zé Bolacha in the Brazilian telenovela A Próxima Vítima.

In the 2001 "Ready, Willing, and Disabled" episode of the cartoon Family Guy, Mort Goldman is seen singing along to a muzak version of the song in his pharmacy.

This song is featured in the movie Invincible with Mark Wahlberg in the lead role.

In August 2012, a Remax commercial featured Croce singing the song.

The song is featured in Quentin Tarantino's 2012 film Django Unchained.

It is also heard in the 2017 trailer for the film Logan, and in the film itself.

This song is featured in The Lego Ninjago Movie (2017).

A.J. Croce, Jim's son, recorded the song for a 2018 Goodyear tire commercial featuring Dale Earnhardt Jr.

It can be heard in the second episode of the 2020 HBO series I Know This Much Is True.

It is featured in the first episode of the 2025 HBO series The Chair Company
