= Home Recordings: Americana =

Compilation album by Jim Croce
- Released: October 14, 2003
- Recorded: 1967
- Genre: Folk rock
- Length: 31:13
- Label: High Coin
- Producer: A.J. Croce, Ingrid Croce

Jim Croce chronology
Jim Croce Live: The Final Tour (1980)	Home Recordings: Americana (2003)	Have You Heard: Jim Croce Live (2006)

Professional ratings
Review scores
Source	Rating
Allmusic	3.5/5 stars

Home Recordings: Americana is an album by American singer-songwriter Jim Croce, released in 2003. This album is a compilation of unreleased tracks and demos. This compilation was the first new material of Jim Croce's work released since 1973. The album also contains liner notes written by Croce's son A.J. Croce and his wife Ingrid Croce. The material was recorded in 1967 at his Pennsylvania kitchen table on an old Wollensak reel-to-reel tape recorder.

== Background ==
A.J. Croce, who co-produced the album, told Billboard: "It was a very emotional experience for me. I really got to know a piece of my father that I'd never known. I'm influenced by old American music, of course, and by British pop music and rock'n'roll. I felt he was influenced by troubadours like Woody Guthrie and knew of his influences from the '20s and '30s—but never really heard them in his music. But he made a lot of home tapes of things he loved, and when I listened to them, I heard him play songs I had played when I was that age. He was discovering what he was about in these tapes. You can hear all these classic folk songs or jazz or blues or drinking songs, as well as early pieces of songs like 'Time in a Bottle' that were coming out of them. And at first he played his own songs timidly, whereas just a year or two later he had enormous confidence in playing his own material."

== Track listing ==
No.	Title	Writer(s)	Length
1.	"Living with the Blues"	Brownie McGhee, Ruth McGhee	1:59
2.	"Things 'Bout Goin' My Way"	Hudson Whittaker	2:04
3.	"Nobody Loves a Fat Girl"	Ted Shapiro	1:59
4.	"You Oughta See Pickles Now"	Dick Reynolds	2:09
5.	"Cigarettes, Whiskey and Wild Wild Women"	Tim Spencer	1:49
6.	"In the Jailhouse Now"	Jimmie Rodgers	1:51
7.	"If the Back Door Could Talk"	Martin Grady	1:42
8.	"Who Will Buy the Wine"	Billy Mize	1:30
9.	"Mom and Dad's Waltz"	Lefty Frizzell	1:20
10.	"The Wall"	Harlan Howard	4:35
11.	"Sadie Green (The Vamp of New Orleans)"	Gilbert Wills, Johnny Dunn	1:42
12.	"I Got Mine"	Traditional	2:48
13.	"I Wish I Could Shimmy Like My Sister Kate"	Clarence Williams, Armand Piron	1:39
14.	"Six Days on the Road"	Carl Montgomery, Earl Green	1:31
15.	"Mama Tried"	Merle Haggard	2:35

== Personnel ==
- Jim Croce – guitar, vocals
