= Saja Records =

- Defunct: 2008

Saja Records was a LeFrak-Moelis Records subsidiary.

It formerly held the rights to Jim Croce's ABC-Dunhill releases, as well as Stevie B's recordings before he signed with Empire Musicwerks. It was distributed by Atlantic Records.

The LeFrak music catalog, including Saja, was sold to R2M Music in 2008, and R2M was later absorbed by BMG Rights Management in 2012. BMG has rereleased Croce's ABC recordings since then.

== See also ==
- List of record labels
