= Operator (That's Not the Way It Feels) =

Single by Jim Croce

from the album You Don't Mess Around with Jim
- B-side: "Rapid Roy (The Stock Car Boy)"
- Released: August 23, 1972
- Recorded: 1972
- Genre: Folk-pop
- Length: 3:50
- Label: ABC (USA); Vertigo (UK, Mexico)
- Songwriter: Jim Croce
- Producers: Terry Cashman, Tommy West

Jim Croce singles chronology
"You Don't Mess Around with Jim" (1972)	"Operator (That's Not the Way It Feels)" (1972)	"One Less Set of Footsteps" (1973)

"Operator (That's Not the Way It Feels)" is a 1972 song written by American singer-songwriter Jim Croce. Croce's record was released on August 23, 1972. It was the second single released from Croce's third studio album You Don't Mess Around with Jim. The song reached a peak of number 17 on the Billboard Hot 100 in December 1972, spending twelve weeks on the chart.

== Content ==
Cash Box described the lyrics saying that "in James Taylor fashion, Croce tries to track down his long lost lover with the help of the operator."

The song relates one side of a conversation with a telephone operator. The narrator is trying to find the phone number of his former lover, who has moved to Los Angeles with his former best friend. The narrator wants to demonstrate to both of them that he is well and over their betrayal, but admits to the operator that he is not. After the operator has given the narrator the number, he is unable to read it, apparently due to the tears in his eyes. The narrator then changes his mind and tells the operator not to place the call, appreciatively adding "you can keep the dime" (the then-standard toll he had deposited in a payphone).

The story was inspired during Croce's military service, during which time he saw lines of soldiers waiting to use the outdoor phone on base, many of them calling their wives or girlfriends to see if their Dear John letter was true.

Record World called the song a "strong story-telling tune in the Chuck Berry 'Memphis' vein" and said that "the single is a near-perfect matching of this singer to the song."

== Live performances ==
In 1973, Croce performed "Operator (That's Not the Way It Feels)" on the series The Midnight Special. Live versions of the song have also been released on the albums Jim Croce Live: The Final Tour and Have You Heard: Jim Croce Live.

== Popular culture ==
- Homer Simpson sings the song, with many errors in the lyrics, in The Simpsons season 30 episode 5, "Baby You Can't Drive My Car".
- In 2005, American singer Tori Amos covered the song during a Yahoo! Music session.

== Track listing ==
7" Single (ABC-11335)

1. "Operator (That's Not The Way It Feels)" - 3:45
2. "Rapid Roy (The Stock Car Boy) " - 2:40

== Personnel ==
- Jim Croce – rhythm guitar, lead vocals
- Maury Muehleisen – lead acoustic guitar, backing vocals
- Gary Chester – drums
- Tommy West – keyboards, backing vocals
- Joe Macho – bass
- Terry Cashman – backing vocals

== Charts ==
Chart (1972–1973)	Peak position
Canadian RPM Top Singles	11
U.S. Billboard Hot 100	17
U.S. Cash Box Top 100	14
U.S. Billboard Easy Listening	11
