= Facets (album) =

1966 studio album by Jim Croce

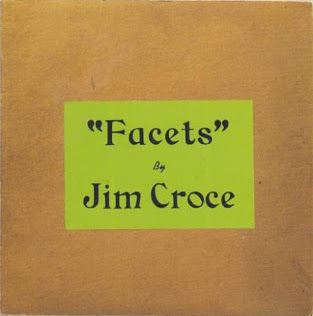

Studio album by Jim Croce
- Released: 1966; March 23, 2004 (reissue)
- Recorded: July 1966
- Studios: Ken-Del Studios, Wilmington, DE
- Genre: Folk rock
- Length: 26:45; 44:32 (reissue)
- Labels: Croce Records; Shout! Factory (reissue)
- Producer: Joe Salviuolo

Jim Croce chronology
Facets (1966)	Jim & Ingrid Croce (1969)

Alternative cover
- 2004 cover artwork by Shout! Factory

Professional ratings
Review scores
Source	Rating
AllMusic	3/5 stars

Facets is the debut studio album by American singer-songwriter Jim Croce, released and self-published in 1966. Croce had 500 copies of the album pressed, financed with a $500 wedding gift he and his wife, Ingrid Croce, received from his parents. Croce's parents were certain that Jim would fail at selling the record; they believed that once he realized he could not support a family as a singer, he would abandon music and finish his college education.

The album was recorded in a three-hour session at Ken-Del Studios in Wilmington, Delaware. Unexpectedly, the album proved a success; Croce sold every copy and turned a profit of $2,500. The majority of the records were sold to fans at local bars where Croce performed. Original vinyl copies of Facets are extremely rare.

Shout! Factory released an expanded CD version in 2004. The seven bonus tracks included on the CD were recorded in 1969, following the recording of the Jim & Ingrid Croce album in 1968. The couple had recorded 21 songs as a demonstration tape to audition for a children's television show in Boston, though they did not get the job. These demo recordings remained unreleased until seven tracks were selected for the 2004 reissue.

== Track listing ==
=== Original release (1966) ===
No.	Title	Writer(s)	Length
1.	"Steel Rail Blues"	Gordon Lightfoot	2:17
2.	"Coal Tattoo"	Billy Edd Wheeler	2:17
3.	"Texas Rodeo"	Jim Croce	1:44
4.	"Charley Green, Play That Slide Trombone"	Traditional; arranged by Jim Croce	2:27
5.	"The Ballad of Gunga Din"	words: Rudyard Kipling; music: Jim Croce	4:05
6.	"Hard Hearted Hannah (The Vamp of Savannah)"	Milton Ager; Jack Yellen; Robert Wilcox Bigelow; Charles Bates	1:58
7.	"Sun Come Up"	Jim Croce; Richard Croce	2:06
8.	"The Blizzard"	Harlan Howard	2:54
9.	"Running Maggie"	Traditional; arranged by Karl Fehrenbach	1:52
10.	"Until It's Time for Me to Go"	Buffy Sainte-Marie	3:05
11.	"Big Fat Woman"	Traditional; arranged by Eric Von Schmidt	2:00

=== 2004 reissue bonus tracks ===
All tracks are written by Jim Croce and Ingrid Croce, except where noted.

No.	Title	Writer(s)	Length
12.	"Child of Midnight"		2:51
13.	"It's All Over, Mary Ann"		2:35
14.	"Railroads and Riverboats"		3:13
15.	"Hard Times Be Over"		1:52
16.	"Railroad Song"	Jim Croce	2:55
17.	"Maybe Tomorrow"	Jim Croce	2:30
18.	"Pa (Song for a Grandfather)"		1:51

== Personnel ==
- Jim Croce – guitar, vocals
- Richard Croce – percussion
- Mike DiBenedetto – keyboards
- Karl Fehrenbach – guitar, banjo
- Ken Cavender – bass

== Production ==
- Producer: Joe Salviuolo
- Arrangements: Jim Croce, Eric Von Schmidt
