= Time in a Bottle =

1973 single by Jim Croce

Single by Jim Croce

from the album You Don't Mess Around with Jim
- B-side: "Hard Time Losin' Man" (US/Canada) "Hey Tomorrow" (international)
- Released: November 1973
- Recorded: January–March 1972
- Studio: The Hit Factory (New York City)
- Genre: Psychedelic folk
- Length: 2:29
- Label: ABC
- Songwriter: Jim Croce
- Producers: Terry Cashman, Tommy West

Jim Croce singles chronology
"I Got a Name" (1973)	"Time in a Bottle" (1973)	"It Doesn't Have to Be That Way" (1973)

"Time in a Bottle" is a song by singer-songwriter Jim Croce. It appeared on Croce's 1972 ABC third album You Don't Mess Around with Jim and was featured in the 1973 ABC made-for-television movie She Lives!. After Croce was killed in a plane crash in September 1973, the song was aired frequently on radio, and demand for a single release built. The single of "Time in a Bottle" became Croce's second and final track to reach number one in the United States.

== Composition ==
Croce wrote the lyrics after his wife, Ingrid, told him she was pregnant in December 1970. The arrangement features a harpsichord that producer Tommy West discovered had been left in the mixing studio.

== Reception ==
Cash Box magazine called the song "a sweet, tender ballad filled with Croce's magical vocal touch". Record World called it "an instant classic and an extremely moving record."

"Time in a Bottle" was the third posthumous Billboard number-one hit after "Sittin' on the Dock of the Bay" by Otis Redding and "Me and Bobby McGee" by Janis Joplin.

After the single finished its two-week run at the top of the charts in early January 1974, the album You Don't Mess Around with Jim became No. 1 for five weeks.

In 1977, "Time in a Bottle" was used as the title of a compilation album of Croce's love songs.

== Track listing ==
7" single (ABC-11405)

1. "Time in a Bottle" – 2:24
2. "Hard Time Losin' Man" – 2:23

== Personnel ==
Sources:

- Jim Croce – rhythm guitar, vocals
- Maury Muehleisen – lead acoustic guitar
- Tommy West – harpsichord, bass

== Charts ==
=== Weekly charts ===
Chart (1973–1974)	Peak position
Australian Top 100 Singles	60
Canadian RPM Top Singles	1
Canadian RPM Adult Contemporary	1
U.S. Billboard Hot 100	1
U.S. Billboard Easy Listening	1
U.S. Cash Box Top 100	1

=== Year-end charts ===
Chart (1974)	Rank
Canadian RPM Top Singles	39
U.S. Billboard Hot 100	24
U.S. Cash Box Top 100	36

== Certifications ==
Region	Certification	Certified units/sales
New Zealand (RMNZ)	Platinum	30,000^{‡}
United States (RIAA)	Gold	1,000,000^{^}
^{^} Shipments figures based on certification alone.^{‡} Sales+streaming figures based on certification alone.

== In popular culture ==
- The song was performed on a 1977 episode of The Muppet Show.
- The song was used in television commercials for Mateus wine in 1983.
- The song was sung by Leslie Chow (Ken Jeong) and Alan Garner (Zach Galifianakis) in an elevator in The Hangover Part II.
- The song was featured in X-Men: Days of Future Past in a slow-motion sequence showcasing the character Peter Maximoff/Quicksilver.
- In 2016, Apple released an iPhone 6s commercial called "Timer" which played some of "Time in a Bottle"; the commercial also features Sesame Street's Cookie Monster interacting with Siri.
- The song was featured in the Marvel Cinematic Universe television series Agatha All Along end credits for episode seven "Death's Hand in Mine".
