= You Don't Mess Around with Jim (song) =

Single by Jim Croce

from the album You Don't Mess Around with Jim
- B-side: "Photographs and Memories"
- Released: June 1972
- Recorded: October 11, 1971; The Hit Factory (New York City)
- Genre: Folk rock; blues; boogie-woogie
- Length: 3:02
- Label: ABC
- Songwriter: Jim Croce
- Producers: Terry Cashman, Tommy West

Jim Croce singles chronology
"You Don't Mess Around with Jim" (1972)	"Operator (That's Not the Way It Feels)" (1972)

Audio
- "You Don't Mess Around with Jim" by Jim Croce on YouTube

Performance video
- "You Don't Mess Around with Jim" (from Midnight Special, June 15, 1973) by Jim Croce on YouTube

"You Don't Mess Around with Jim" is a 1972 story song by Jim Croce from his album of the same name. It was his debut single, released on ABC Records as ABC-11328. ABC Records promotion man Marty Kupps took the song to KHJ 930 AM in Los Angeles, CA where it first aired. The song made the KHJ "30" chart (at #27) that week of June 6, 1972. After spending 11 weeks on the Billboard Hot 100 chart, it peaked at No. 8 the week ending September 9. Croce performed the song on American Bandstand on August 12, 1972. Billboard ranked it as the No. 68 song for 1972.

== Content ==
The lyrics are set around an underground pool hall on 42nd Street in New York City. "Big" Jim Walker, a pool hustler who is not too bright but is respected because of his tough reputation, his considerable strength and size, and his skill at pool, has formed a sort of gang of "bad folks" who regularly gather at night in the pool hall. Their recurring words of advice are as follows:

You don't tug on Superman's cape
You don't spit in the wind
You don't pull the mask off the old Lone Ranger
And you don't mess around with Jim

A fellow pool player named Willie "Slim" McCoy comes from south Alabama to the pool hall to get his money back from Jim after being hustled out of it the previous week. When Jim comes in, McCoy gets in a fight with him, stabbing him in "about a hundred places" (to the point where "the only part that wasn't bloody was the soles of the big man's feet") and shooting him "in a couple more", ultimately killing him. It is implied that McCoy now has his money back as well as the respect formerly granted to Jim, and the regulars at the pool hall have now changed their advice to strangers: "You don't mess around with Slim".

The song is noted for its spoken recitation, which is heard following the third verse and chorus:

Yeah, Big Jim got his hat
Find out where it's at
And it's not hustlin' people strange to you
Even if you do got a two-piece custom-made pool cue

This is followed by the repeat of the chorus and the repeated coda before the song's fade.

Croce tells a similar story—a much-feared tough guy who gets his comeuppance from someone even tougher—in his later hit single "Bad, Bad Leroy Brown".

== Reception ==
Cash Box described it as being "perfectly polished and honed for super Top 40/MOR/FM impact" despite being Croce's first single. Record World said that the song "is just fine, and it appears another star is born."

== Live performances ==
Live versions of the song have been released on both of Croce's live albums, Have You Heard: Jim Croce Live and Jim Croce Live: The Final Tour.

== Track listing ==
7" single (ABC-11328)

1. "You Don't Mess Around with Jim" – 3:00
2. "Photographs and Memories" – 2:03

== Personnel ==
- Jim Croce – lead vocals, rhythm guitar
- Maury Muehleisen – lead acoustic guitar
- Tommy West – piano
- Joe Macho – bass guitar
- Gary Chester – drums
- Ellie Greenwich – backing vocals
- Tasha Thomas – backing vocals

== Charts ==
=== Weekly charts ===
Chart (1972)	Peak position
Canada Top Singles (RPM)	4
France Pop Singles	15
US Billboard Hot 100	8
US Easy Listening (Billboard)	9
US Cash Box Top 100	7

=== Year-end charts ===
Chart (1972)	Rank
Canada Top Singles (RPM)	51
US Billboard Hot 100	68
US Cash Box Top 100	56

== Poison cover ==
American glam metal band Poison covered the song (under the name ''Don't Mess Around With Jim (demo)''). It is included as a bonus track on the 2006 remaster of their 1986 debut album Look What the Cat Dragged In. It is the 13th track on the album.

== Josh Turner cover ==
Josh Turner covered "You Don't Mess Around with Jim" on his 2003 debut album Long Black Train.

== See also ==
- Billboard Year-End Hot 100 singles of 1972
