= Life and Times (Jim Croce album) =

Studio album by Jim Croce
- Released: January 1973
- Recorded: 1972
- Studios: Hit Factory, New York City
- Genre: Folk rock
- Length: 28:48
- Labels: ABC (USA); Vertigo (UK)
- Producers: Terry Cashman, Tommy West

Jim Croce chronology
You Don't Mess Around with Jim (1972)	Life and Times (1973)	I Got a Name (1973)

Singles from Life and Times
- 1. "One Less Set of Footsteps" Released: February 1973; 2. "Bad, Bad Leroy Brown" Released: April 1973; 3. "It Doesn't Have to Be That Way" Released: December 1973

Professional ratings
Review scores
Source	Rating
AllMusic	3/5 stars
The Encyclopedia of Popular Music	3/5 stars
The New Rolling Stone Record Guide	3/5 stars

Life and Times is the fourth studio album by American singer-songwriter Jim Croce, released in January 1973. The album contains the No. 1 Billboard chart hit "Bad, Bad Leroy Brown". Croce was nominated for two 1973 Grammy Awards in the "Pop Male Vocalist" and "Record of the Year" categories for the song "Bad, Bad Leroy Brown". It would be the last album to be released during Croce's lifetime.

== Production ==
The album was produced by Tommy West and Terry Cashman.

== Critical reception ==
The New Rolling Stone Record Guide wrote: "Croce's nostalgic side began to take over and he started to produce strikingly impersonal experiments in the craft of sentiment. It fits him well."

== Track listing ==
All tracks are written by Jim Croce.

No.	Title	Length
1.	"One Less Set of Footsteps"	2:46
2.	"Roller Derby Queen"	3:28
3.	"Dreamin' Again"	2:38
4.	"Careful Man"	2:22
5.	"Alabama Rain"	2:14
6.	"A Good Time Man Like Me Ain't Got No Business (Singin' the Blues)"	2:05
7.	"Next Time, This Time"	2:55
8.	"Bad, Bad Leroy Brown"	3:02
9.	"These Dreams"	3:12
10.	"Speedball Tucker"	2:26
11.	"It Doesn't Have to Be That Way"	2:31

== Personnel ==
According to liner notes of the album

- Jim Croce – lead vocals (all tracks); acoustic rhythm guitar (all tracks); backing vocals ("Alabama Rain")

Additional personnel

- Maury Muehleisen – acoustic lead guitar (all tracks except "Roller Derby Queen"); harmonica ("Alabama Rain"); backing vocals ("Careful Man" and "Alabama Rain")
- David Spinozza – electric lead guitar ("Roller Derby Queen" and "Alabama Rain")
- Alan Rolnick – electric guitar ("One Less Set of Footsteps")
- Tommy West – piano (all tracks except “Dreamin’ Again”, "A Good Time Man Like Me Ain't Got no Business (Singing the Blues)", “These Dreams” and “Speedball Tucker”); electric piano ("Dreamin' Again"); percussion ("Alabama Rain"); backing vocals (“One Less Set of Footsteps”, “Roller Derby Queen”, “Dreamin’ Again”, “A Good Time Man Like Me Ain’t Got no Business (Singing the Blues)” and “Bad, Bad Leroy Brown”)
- Kenny Ascher – organ ("A Good Time Man Like Me Ain't Got no Business (Singing the Blues)")
- Joe Macho – bass guitar (all tracks)
- Gary Chester – drums (all tracks except "Dreamin' Again", "Alabama Rain" and "These Dreams")
- Eric Weissberg – fiddle ("Careful Man")
- Michael Kamen – oboe ("Next Time, This Time")
- Terry Cashman – backing vocals (“One Less Set of Footsteps”, “Dreamin’ Again” and “Careful Man”)
- Ellie Greenwich – backing vocals (“Roller Derby Queen”, “A Good Time Man Like Me Ain’t Got no Business (Singing the Blues)” and “Bad, Bad Leroy Brown”)
- Tasha Thomas – backing vocals (“Roller Derby Queen”, “A Good Time Man Like Me Ain’t Got no Business (Singing the Blues)” and “Bad, Bad Leroy Brown”)
- Willie "Slim" McCoy – backing vocals (“Bad, Bad Leroy Brown”)
- "Briggs" (real name unknown) – backing vocals (“Bad, Bad Leroy Brown”)
- "Digs" (real name unknown) – backing vocals (“Bad, Bad Leroy Brown”)
- Pete Dino – string arrangements ("These Dreams")

Production

- Producers: Terry Cashman, Tommy West
- Engineer: Bruce Tergesen

== Chart positions ==
=== Weekly charts ===
Year	Chart	Position
1973	Canada Top Albums/CDs (RPM)	1
1973	US Billboard 200	7

Singles

Year	Single	Chart	Position
1973	"One Less Set of Footsteps"	Billboard Hot 100	37
1973	"Bad, Bad Leroy Brown"	Billboard Hot 100	1
1973	"It Doesn't Have to Be That Way"	Billboard Hot 100	64

=== Year-end charts ===
Chart (1973)	Position
US Billboard 200	34
Chart (1974)	Position
US Billboard 200	24

=== Certifications ===
Country	Certifications
United States	Gold
