= You Don't Mess Around with Jim =

Studio album by Jim Croce
- Released: April 1972
- Recorded: 1971–1972
- Studios: Hit Factory, New York City
- Genre: Folk rock
- Length: 33:22
- Labels: ABC (USA); Vertigo (UK)
- Producers: Terry Cashman, Tommy West

Jim Croce chronology
Jim & Ingrid Croce (1969)	You Don't Mess Around with Jim (1972)	Life and Times (1973)

Singles from You Don't Mess Around with Jim
- 1. "You Don't Mess Around with Jim" Released: July 1972; 2. "Operator (That's Not the Way It Feels)" Released: August 23, 1972; 3. "Time in a Bottle" Released: November 1973

You Don't Mess Around with Jim is the third studio album and major-label debut by American singer-songwriter Jim Croce. It was released in April 1972 by ABC Records.

== History and release ==
The album was recorded over a three- to four-week period for about $18,000, with most funding coming from the PolyGram Group in Baarn, the Netherlands, on the basis of hearing an eight-song demonstration tape assembled by production team Cashman & West. The deal with PolyGram was made after team attorney Phil Kurnit approached a contact within the record company, who then had PolyGram executives listen to the demo tape. After having the finished album rejected by up to 40 record labels, Croce was signed to ABC Records after Cashman & West had a chance meeting with ABC promotion man Marty Kupps. Kupps urged label head Jay Lasker to sign Croce after hearing cuts from a cassette tape of the finished album.

The record spent 93 weeks on the charts, longer than any other Jim Croce album. Due to the strong performance of the posthumous single release "Time in a Bottle" (number-one pop, number-one adult contemporary), You Don't Mess Around with Jim was the best-selling album in the U.S. for five weeks in early 1974. It was listed at No. 6 on the 1974 Cash Box year-end album charts. Two singles were originally released from the album in 1972, the title track (number-eight pop) and "Operator (That's Not the Way It Feels)" (number-17 pop).

The album was issued on CD by the Rhino Flashbacks record label on September 30, 2008.

== Tracks ==
The lyrics of the title track concern the fate of a "pool-shooting son-of-a-gun" by the name of "Big" Jim Walker when his mark, Willie "Slim" McCoy, from South Alabama, shows up to get a refund from being hustled or get revenge. The song is notable for the line, "You don't tug on Superman's cape/You don't spit into the wind/You don't pull the mask off that ol' Lone Ranger/And you don't mess around with Jim." After the song ends with Jim being thoroughly thrashed by his victim ("he'd been cut 'n 'bout a hundred places/ and he'd been shot in a couple more"), though, the chorus now goes, "You don't mess around with Slim."

== Reception ==
Professional ratings
Review scores
Source	Rating
Allmusic	3.5/5 stars
Christgau's Record Guide	B−
The Encyclopedia of Popular Music	4/5 stars
Paste	9.0/10

William Ruhlmann of AllMusic called it "his commercial breakthrough"

Billboard selected the album for a "Pop Special Merit" review and called it "a Fashioned Album".

== Track listing ==
All tracks are written by Jim Croce.

Side 1
No.	Title	Length
1.	"You Don't Mess Around with Jim"	3:00
2.	"Tomorrow's Gonna Be a Brighter Day"	2:49
3.	"New York's Not My Home"	3:05
4.	"Hard Time Losin' Man"	2:23
5.	"Photographs and Memories"	2:03
6.	"Walkin' Back to Georgia"	2:47
Total length:		16:07

Side 2
No.	Title	Length
1.	"Operator (That's Not the Way It Feels)"	3:45
2.	"Time in a Bottle"	2:24
3.	"Rapid Roy (The Stock Car Boy)"	2:40
4.	"Box No. 10"	2:22
5.	"A Long Time Ago"	2:18
6.	"Hey Tomorrow"	2:40
Total length:		16:09

2006 edition – Disc 1^{[A]}
No.	Title	Length
13.	"Which Way Are You Going'"	2:20
14.	"Mississippi Lady"	3:59
15.	"Country Girl"	1:49
16.	"King's Song"	3:21
17.	"Chain Gang Medley"	4:29
18.	"Ol' Man River"	2:26
Total length:		50:40

2006 edition – Disc 2
No.	Title	Length
1.	"Maybe Tomorrow"	2:30
2.	"Stone Walls"	2:58
3.	"Railroads and Riverboats"	3:12
4.	"(And) I Remember Her"	2:49
5.	"More Than That Tomorrow"	2:44
6.	"The Way We Used to Be"	2:30
7.	"Cotton Mouth River"	2:00
8.	"Circle of Style" (featuring Ingrid Croce)	2:09
9.	"Carnival of Pride" (featuring Ingrid Croce)	1:53
10.	"Wear Out the Turnpike" (featuring Ingrid Croce)	2:14
11.	"Can't Wait" (featuring Ingrid Croce)	1:53
12.	"(The) Migrant Worker" (featuring Ingrid Croce)	1:54
13.	"Railroad Song" (featuring Ingrid Croce)	2:55
14.	"Child of Midnight"	2:48
Total length:		34:29

Notes

- A Tracks 1–12 correspond to the original 1972 album

== Personnel ==
- Jim Croce – rhythm guitar, lead vocals
- Maury Muehleisen – lead acoustic guitar, backing vocals on "Operator (That's Not the Way It Feels)"
- Gary Chester – drums
- The Briggs – backing vocals
- Terry Cashman – backing vocals on "Operator (That's Not the Way It Feels)"
- Tommy West – keyboards, bass on "Photographs and Memories", "Walkin' Back to Georgia", and "Time in a Bottle", backing vocals
- Harry Boyle – electric guitar on "Hey Tomorrow"
- Joe Macho – bass
- Jim Ryan – bass on "Box #10"
- Ellie Greenwich, Tasha Thomas – backing vocals
- Peter Dino – string arrangements

Technical

- Terry Cashman – producer
- Tommy West – producer
- Bruce Tergesen – recording and mixing engineer
- Paul Wilson – photography

== Chart history ==
=== Weekly charts ===
Year	Chart	Position
1974	Canada Top Albums/CDs (RPM)	1
1974	US Billboard 200	1

Singles
Year	Single	Chart	Position
1972	"You Don't Mess Around with Jim"	Billboard Hot 100	8
1972	"You Don't Mess Around with Jim"	Easy Listening	9
1972	"Operator (That's Not the Way It Feels)"	Billboard Hot 100	17
1973	"Time in a Bottle"	Billboard Hot 100	1
1973	"Time in a Bottle"	Easy Listening	1

=== Year-end charts ===
Chart (1974)	Position
Canada Top Albums/CDs (RPM)	6
US Billboard 200	5

=== Certifications ===
Country	Certifications
United States	Gold
