= Ingrid Croce =

American singer-songwriter (born 1947)

- Born: Ingrid Jacobson; April 27, 1947 (age 79); Philadelphia, Pennsylvania, United States
- Occupations: Singer, songwriter, restaurateur
- Spouse: Jim Croce (m. 1966; died 1973)
- Children: A.J. Croce
- Musical career
- Years active: 1966–1984
- Labels: Capitol/EMI, Croce Music Group
- Website: www.ingridcroceart.com

Ingrid Croce (née Jacobson, born April 27, 1947) is an American author, singer-songwriter, and restaurateur. Between 1964 and 1971, Ingrid performed as a duo with her husband, Jim Croce, releasing the album Jim & Ingrid Croce in 1969.

== Biography ==
=== Early life ===
Ingrid Jacobson was born and raised in Philadelphia, Pennsylvania, in a Jewish family that consisted of her parents, Shirley and Sidney, and twin sister, Phyllis. When Ingrid was eight years old, she worked at her grandmother's dress store in South Philadelphia as a helper and seamstress. Shirley played piano on a local television show that was titled The Magic Lady. Ingrid learned to cook with her, and started singing in local clubs and on television by the time she was 10. Sidney was a general practitioner, with his medical office in their home in West Philadelphia. In 1952, when Ingrid was five years old, her parents divorced, and Ingrid was moved from school to school. By the age of 15, she was employed as the junior art therapist, assisting her father at the University of Pennsylvania, where he did his residency for his psychiatric practice. When Ingrid was 16 years old, her mother died at the age of 36 due to breast cancer and a weak heart. Ingrid left high school and gymnastics, and moved to her father's home in the suburbs. Ingrid and Phyllis attended several high schools after their mother's death, and eventually graduated from Nether Providence High School in 1965. Ingrid attended the Rhode Island School of Design and Moore College of Art, and travelled to Mexico in her senior year when she won a fellowship to study painting and pottery in San Miguel de Allende.

=== With Jim Croce ===
On November 29, 1963, when she was 16 years old, Ingrid met her future husband, Jim Croce, at the Philadelphia Convention Hall and Civic Center; Jim was a judge for an upcoming hootenanny that Ingrid had been auditioning in to be a contestant for a role with The Rum Runners. Three years later, they got married in a Jewish wedding.

When Jim and Ingrid Croce discovered they were going to have a child, Jim became more determined to make music his profession. He sent a cassette of his new songs to a friend and producer in New York City, in the hope that he could get a record deal. When their son, Adrian James (A.J.), was born on September 28, 1971, Ingrid became a housewife, while Jim traveled to promote his music.

On September 20, 1973, a week before A.J.'s second birthday, and just as Jim Croce's songs were topping the music charts, Jim died in a plane crash in Natchitoches, Louisiana. After Jim died, Ingrid and A.J. spent time in Quepos, Costa Rica. After they moved to San Diego, she developed a Head Start program for Costa Rica, opened a children's school in Point Loma, and wrote a children's book, Mirandome. When A.J. was almost four years old, he was temporarily blinded by serious physical abuse by Ingrid's boyfriend.

In the early 1970s, Ingrid led the movement to revamp the Gaslamp Quarter, San Diego.

From 1977 to 1981, Ingrid was the vice-consul of Costa Rica in San Diego. She wrote and sang songs, completed two solo albums, and started the publishing company Time in a Bottle. She sat on the board of the Woman's Bank and traveled to Israel, where A.J. took his rites of passage. In 1983, Ingrid became a dedicated runner and finished the Stockholm Marathon, taking third place in her category.

In 1984, while on the road promoting her albums, Ingrid lost her voice because of tumors on her vocal cords. Two operations failed to restore her voice, ending Ingrid's singing career.

=== Restaurant business ===
In 1985, at the suggestion of a friend, Ingrid opened a restaurant, Blinchiki, in Hillcrest, San Diego. The restaurant lasted less than a year.

In 1985, Ingrid opened Croce's, and in 1987, she expanded it to include a jazz bar after obtaining a liquor license. That same day, Ingrid's house burned down. Croce's Restaurant and Jazz Bar was a mainstay of the Gaslamp Quarter until it closed at the end of 2013.

In the late 1980s, Ingrid became a board member of the California Restaurant Association, San Diego County Chapter, and the San Diego Convention & Visitors Bureau.

In 2004, Ingrid launched San Diego Restaurant Week to improve the dining scene in San Diego. Twice per year, the event draws 250,000 guests to 150 participating restaurants.

In 2014, Ingrid moved the restaurant to Bankers Hill, San Diego, and renamed it Croce's Park West. The restaurant had dining, bar, and terrace areas, and a large room at the back for live music. The restaurant closed two years later.

=== Publications ===
In 1996, Ingrid wrote Thyme in a Bottle, an autobiographical cookbook with memories and recipes from Croce's Restaurant. When the book sold out, guests to her restaurant and website were encouraging, and Ingrid re-issued the book in 1998 through her own publishing company, Avalanche Records and Books.

In 2003, 30 years after Jim Croce's death, Ingrid and A.J. Croce released the DVD Have You Heard Jim Croce Live, with an album of the same name, in addition to the albums Jim Croce, Home Recordings, Americana, and Facets (Jim Croce's first album from 1966). KPBS broadcast the documentary The Legacy of Jim Croce, which featured commentary by Ingrid and A.J., and included segments from the DVD.

In 2004, Ingrid published Time in a Bottle, a photographic memoir of Jim Croce's songs, accompanying lyrics, and her favorite photos, compiled in collaboration with her husband, Jim Rock, and Deborah Ogburn.

== Awards and honors ==
- San Diego County Women's Hall of Fame, 2012
