= Bad, Bad Leroy Brown =

1973 single by Jim Croce

- Cover for release in Spain

Single by Jim Croce

from the album Life and Times
- A-side: "Roller Derby Queen" (UK)
- B-side: "A Good Time Man Like Me Ain't Got No Business (Singin' the Blues)" (US/Canada) "Hard Time Losin' Man" (other countries)
- Released: March 20, 1973
- Recorded: 1972
- Genre: Boogie-woogie
- Length: 3:02
- Label: ABC; Vertigo (international)
- Songwriter: Jim Croce
- Producers: Terry Cashman, Tommy West

Jim Croce singles chronology
"One Less Set of Footsteps" (1973)	"Bad, Bad Leroy Brown" (1973)	"I Got a Name" (1973)

Audio
- "Bad, Bad Leroy Brown" on YouTube

"Bad, Bad Leroy Brown" is an uptempo, strophic story song written by American folk rock singer Jim Croce. Released as part of his 1973 album Life and Times, the song was a No. 1 hit for him, spending two weeks at the top of the Billboard Hot 100 in July 1973. Billboard ranked it as the No. 2 song for 1973.

Croce was nominated for two 1973 Grammy Awards in the Pop Male Vocalist and Record of the Year categories for "Bad, Bad Leroy Brown". It was Croce's only number-one single before his death on September 20 of that year and his final single to be released during his lifetime. This song is also the last song Croce publicly sang in his lifetime.

== Synopsis ==
The song's titular character is a man about 6-foot-4-inch (1.93 m) tall from the South Side of Chicago whose size, attitude, and tendency to carry weapons have given him a reputation for which he is adored by women and feared and respected by men. Leroy Brown is said to dress in fancy clothes and wear diamond rings, and to own a custom Lincoln Continental and a Cadillac Eldorado, implying he has a lot of money. Brown is also known to carry a .32 caliber handgun in his pocket and a razor in his shoe (shown in the music video as an old-fashioned straight razor). One day in a bar, he makes a pass at a pretty married woman named Doris, whose jealous husband engages Brown in a fight. Brown loses badly and is described as looking "like a jigsaw puzzle with a couple of pieces gone".

The story of a widely feared man being bested in a fight is similar to that of Croce's earlier song "You Don't Mess Around with Jim".

According to Billboard, it is "filled with humorous lines and a catchy arrangement". Cash Box described it as "a delightful new single in the same musical vein as his 'You Don't Mess Around with Jim' smash that started his career". Record World called it "another story-song similar to the one that started it all for [Croce], 'You Don't Mess Around With Jim'".

== Inspiration ==
Croce's inspiration for the song was a friend he met in his brief time in the US Army:

I met him at Fort Dix, New Jersey. We were in lineman (telephone) school together. He stayed there about a week, and one evening he turned around and said he was really fed up and tired. He went AWOL, and then came back at the end of the month to get his paycheck. They put handcuffs on him and took him away. Just to listen to him talk and see how 'bad' he was, I knew someday I was gonna write a song about him.

Croce told a variation of this story on The Helen Reddy Show in July 1973:

This is a song about a guy I was in the army with ... It was at Fort Dix, in New Jersey, that I met this guy. He was not made to climb the tree of knowledge, as they say, but he was strong, so nobody'd ever told him what to do, and after about a week down there he said "Later for this" and decided to go home. So he went AWOL—which means to take your own vacation—and he did. But he made the mistake of coming back at the end of the month to get his paycheck. I don't know if you've ever seen handcuffs put on anybody, but it was SNAP and that was the end of it for a good friend of mine, who I wrote this tune about, named Leroy Brown.

Croce explained the chorus reference to Leroy Brown being "meaner than a junkyard dog":

Yeah, I spent about a year and a half driving those $29 cars, so I drove around a lot looking for a universal joint for a '57 Chevy panel truck or a transmission for a '51 Dodge. I got to know many junkyards well, and they all have those dogs in them. They all have either an axle tied around their necks or an old lawnmower to keep 'em at least slowed down a bit, so you have a decent chance of getting away from them.

== Track listing ==
North American 7" Single (ABC-11359)

1. "Bad, Bad Leroy Brown" – 3:02
2. "A Good Time Man Like Me Ain't Got No Business (Singin' The Blues)" – 2:03

UK 7" Single (Vertigo 6073 258)

1. "Roller Derby Queen" – 3:28
2. "Bad, Bad Leroy Brown" – 3:02

International 7" Single (Vertigo 6073 256)

1. "Bad, Bad Leroy Brown" – 3:02
2. "Hard Time Losin' Man" – 2:24

== Personnel ==
According to liner notes of the album

- Jim Croce – lead vocals, acoustic rhythm guitar
- Maury Muehleisen – acoustic lead guitar
- Tommy West – piano, backing vocals
- Joe Macho – bass guitar
- Gary Chester – drums
- Ellie Greenwich – backing vocals
- Tasha Thomas – backing vocals
- Willie McCoy – backing vocals

The recording session that produced the song was one of several for Croce which employed session drummer Gary Chester.

== Chart performance ==
"Bad, Bad Leroy Brown" entered the charts in April 1973 and peaked at number one on the American charts three months later. It was still on the charts on September 20 when Croce died in a plane crash in Natchitoches, Louisiana. The song was the second #1 song on the Billboard Hot 100 pop singles chart to include a curse word ("damn") in its lyrics, after the "Theme from Shaft".

== Charts ==
=== Weekly charts ===
Chart (1973)	Peak position
Australia KMR	11
Australia Go-Set Top 40 Singles	19
Canadian RPM Top Singles	1
Canadian RPM Adult Contemporary	3
German Media Control Charts	38
Netherlands (Dutch Top 40)	27
Netherlands (Single Top 100)	20
US Billboard Hot 100	1
US Adult Contemporary (Billboard)	9
US Cash Box Top 100	1

=== Year-end charts ===
Chart (1973)	Rank
Australia	88
Canada RPM Top Singles	15
US Billboard Hot 100	2
US Cash Box Top 100	2

== Certifications ==
Region	Certification	Certified units/sales
New Zealand (RMNZ)	Gold	15,000^{‡}
United States (RIAA)	Gold	1,000,000^{^}
^{^} Shipments figures based on certification alone.^{‡} Sales+streaming figures based on certification alone.

== Frank Sinatra version ==
"Bad, Bad Leroy Brown"

Single by Frank Sinatra

from the album Some Nice Things I've Missed
- B-side: "I'm Gonna Make It All The Way"
- Released: March 1974
- Recorded: 1973–1974
- Genre: Traditional pop
- Length: 2:49
- Label: Reprise
- Songwriter: Jim Croce
- Producer: Don Costa

Frank Sinatra singles chronology
"You Will Be My Music" (1973)	"Bad, Bad Leroy Brown" (1974)	"You Turned My World Around" (1974)

Audio
- "Bad, Bad Leroy Brown" on YouTube

The song was covered by Frank Sinatra as the closing track on his 1974 studio album Some Nice Things I've Missed, which mostly consisted of covers of popular songs released during his brief retirement in the early 1970s. Sinatra's version was released as a single on Reprise Records in March 1974 and was a minor hit in the US, peaking at Number 83 on the Hot 100 that June. As with most tracks on the album, Sinatra's version was produced and conducted by Don Costa. Sinatra's version also reached Number 106 in the Cashbox charts and Number 31 on the US Adult Contemporary charts, the highest chart position for Sinatra's version.

=== Charts ===
Chart (1974)	Peak position
US Billboard Hot 100	83
US Adult Contemporary (Billboard)	31
US Cash Box Top 100	106

== Sylvie Vartan version (in French) ==
"Bye Bye Leroy Brown"

Single by Sylvie Vartan
- Language: French
- B-side: "Bien sûr"
- Released: June 1974
- Recorded: Early 1974
- Genre: Pop
- Length: 3:12
- Label: RCA
- Songwriters: Jim Croce, Michel Mallory

Sylvie Vartan singles chronology
"Toi le garçon" (1973)	"Bye Bye Leroy Brown" (1974)	"Da dou ron ron" (1974)

Audio
- "Bye Bye Leroy Brown" (French TV, 1975) on YouTube

In 1974, the song was adapted into French as "Bye Bye Leroy Brown" by Michel Mallory and was recorded by French pop singer Sylvie Vartan and was released as a non-album single on RCA Records in June 1974. Vartan's version peaked at peaked at Number 17 on the French Belgian charts on September 14, 1974.

=== Charts ===
Chart (1974)	Peak position
Belgium (Ultratop 50 Wallonia)	17

== Other notable versions ==
- Queen recorded a sequel of sorts to the song called "Bring Back That Leroy Brown" on their 1974 album Sheer Heart Attack.
