= Tommy West (music producer) =

American singer-songwriter (1942–2021)

- Born: Thomas Picardo Jr. August 17, 1942; Jersey City, New Jersey, U.S.
- Died: May 2, 2021 (aged 78)
- Genres: Pop
- Occupations: Producer, singer-songwriter
- Instruments: Keyboards, piano, guitar, vocals
- Years active: 1968–2021
- Formerly of: Cashman & West; The Buchanan Brothers

Thomas Picardo Jr. (August 17, 1942 – May 2, 2021), known by the stage name Tommy West, was an American record producer and singer-songwriter.

== Early career ==
Thomas Picardo Jr. was born in Jersey City, New Jersey.

West's career as a performing artist began in 1958 when he co-founded the doo-wop group The Criterions with Tim Hauser, a classmate of his at St. Rose High School in Belmar, New Jersey. In 1959, the group hit the pop charts with "I Remain Truly Yours".

West is a 1963 graduate of Villanova University. While attending Villanova, he became student conductor of the school's glee club, The Villanova Singers. West formed a sub-group of the Singers called The Villanova Spires, a 12-man group who performed folk songs with guitar accompaniment. Tim Hauser, also then a student at Villanova, joined the group. In 1961, West auditioned fellow student Jim Croce for The Spires and an enduring friendship was formed.

After graduating in 1963, West became a radio announcer and music director of WRLB (FM) in Long Branch, New Jersey. In 1966, he left the station and began work for ABC Records in New York, where he met Terry Cashman and Gene Pistilli, songwriters at the company. This trio, Cashman, Pistilli and West, began a writing and performing collaboration. In 1967, they recorded an album titled Bound To Happen.

West became a session singer and sang back-up vocals on albums by Frank Sinatra, Perry Como, Sammy Davis Jr., Connie Francis, Jim Croce, and Mitch Ryder. He was a jingle singer for radio and television commercials.

== Capitol Records ==
In 1968, Cashman, Pistilli and West signed with Capitol Records and recorded an album titled Cashman, Pistilli & West, produced by Nik Venet. Simultaneously, they recorded under the pseudonym Buchanan Brothers. This trio is remembered for the single "Medicine Man". Also that year, they formed the publishing companies Interrobang Productions, Blendingwell Music, and Sister John Music. They signed folk duo Jim and Ingrid Croce and secured a recording contract with Capitol Records in 1969, turning production duties over to Nik Venet for their album Jim & Ingrid Croce. The album was released, but was not well received.

In 1969, Cashman, Pistilli and West were introduced to a talented young musician, Maury Muehleisen. Soon after they signed Muehleisen, Pistilli left the partnership and became a founding member of The Manhattan Transfer, joining up with West's lifelong hometown friend Tim Hauser and West's then wife, Pat Rosalia.

Cashman and West produced Muehleisen's album Gingerbreadd, released by Capitol Records in November 1970. This critically well received album brought together Muehleisen and Jim Croce, who for a short time accompanied Muehleisen on guitar for live performances.

Cashman and West began an association with producer Wes Farrell and composed eight songs that were recorded by The Partridge Family: "She'd Rather Have The Rain", "Only A Moment Ago", "Every Song Is You", "One Day At A Time", "Come On Love", "Sunshine Eyes", "It Sounds Like You're Saying Hello", and "It's Time That I Knew You Better".

== Success with Jim Croce ==
In 1971, Cashman and West signed as artists with ABC-Dunhill and produced the first of three Jim Croce albums, You Don't Mess Around With Jim. Recorded in late 1971 and released in April 1972, this album produced three hit singles. Simultaneously, Cashman and West were on the charts with their first single, their tribute to New York City, the "American City Suite".

In 1973, Cashman and West produced Croce's Life and Times and I Got a Name albums. They received five gold records for their work on Jim Croce's hits - No. 1 singles "Bad, Bad Leroy Brown" and "Time in a Bottle", and three albums (You Don't Mess Around With Jim, Life and Times, and I Got A Name), and all three now have reached platinum status. Croce and Muehleisen perished in a small plane crash in Natchitoches, Louisiana on September 20, 1973.

Cashman and West went on to record two more albums for ABC-Dunhill, Moondog Serenade and Lifesong.

Tommy West recorded the solo single "I Know" which reached No. 114 in Record World and No. 30 in Billboard's "Easy Listening" Top 50, in early 1977. The song was a remake of a 1960 tune by the Spaniels.

== Career as a producer ==
In 1974, Cashman and West produced records by Jim Dawson and Mary Travers. In 1975, they formed Lifesong Records and recorded singer-songwriter Henry Gross, who in 1976 had a million-selling single "Shannon". West also recorded Hometown Frolics, his solo album. In 1978, Cashman and West produced Dion's "The Return of the Wanderer". West began recording in Nashville in 1978, producing an album by Gail Davies and beginning a five-album collaboration with Ed Bruce.

In 1984, West entered into a partnership with Mary Tyler Moore's MTM Records, based in Nashville. Production credits during this time include recordings by Judy Rodman, Holly Dunn, and Girls Next Door and The Metros from Minneapolis. West produced two No. 1 country singles - "You're the Best Break This Old Heart Ever Had" with Ed Bruce (MCA Nashville) and "Until I Met You" with Judy Rodman (one of two number ones on MTM Records).

In 1992, Tommy West launched High Harmony Records. Its initial release, Through The Raindrops, by harmonica virtuoso Robert Bonfiglio, remained on the Billboard New Age chart for nine months. The album made the Top Twenty New Age year-end chart in Billboard and launched Bonfiglio's success on the QVC Network, where his appearances generated over 200,000 units. In 1993, West teamed up with Anne Murray and produced Croonin', a collection of pre-rock songs of the 1950s. The album achieved double platinum status in Canada and had a substantial run on the American charts as well. Croonin' received a Juno Award as best engineered pop recording of 1993. In 1994, West produced Kindred Spirits with New Age pianist Andy Wasserman. In 1996, West produced Always On My Mind, a collection of pop standards with Robert Bonfiglio for Time-Life Records. In 1997, West produced Healing In The Dark with acoustic rock duo Blonde on Blonde. He produced a Bonfiglio Christmas TV special for PBS called "Home For The Holidays". In 1998, he produced Playing God with singer-songwriter Bob Hillman. A second album, Welcome To My Century, was recorded in 2000. In 1999, West again teamed up with Anne Murray and produced What a Wonderful World, a two CD collection of inspirational and secular "message songs". This recording reached No. 1 on the Billboard Contemporary Christian chart, achieving double platinum status in the United States.

In 2000, West produced Susan Piper's album, The Truth Comes Out. In 2001, West produced eight Christmas songs with Anne Murray as part of a project entitled What a Wonderful Christmas. In 2002, West produced Country Croonin' a 30-song double CD of country tracks, which was certified gold in 2004 by the RIAA. In 2004, West produced All of Me with Anne Murray, a collection of pop standards from the Great American Songbook.

West focused on new singer-songwriters and recorded many of his projects in his state of the art studio, "Somewhere In New Jersey". Most recently he teamed up with former RCA recording artist Jim Dawson and former Cashman and West tour manager, John Battiloro, to produce the anthem "Back Together Again" for The Global Medical Relief Fund at his New Jersey studio.

West died from complications of Parkinson's disease on May 2, 2021.
