= Maury Muehleisen =

American singer-songwriter (1949–1973)

- Born: January 14, 1949; Trenton, New Jersey, U.S.
- Died: September 20, 1973 (aged 24) Natchitoches, Louisiana, U.S.
- Genres: Folk, folk rock, pop
- Occupation: Musician-songwriter
- Instruments: Guitar, piano

Maurice Thomas Muehleisen (January 14, 1949 – September 20, 1973) was an American musician, songwriter, and artist known for his studio work, live accompaniment, and impact on the music of Jim Croce. Muehleisen died in the same plane crash that killed Croce.

== Early life ==
Muehleisen was born on January 14, 1949, into a large family in Trenton, New Jersey, to Maurice Joseph Muehleisen and Margaret Josephine (Malone) Muehleisen. He received classical piano training at age nine and began playing guitar at age 17. Muehleisen briefly attended Glassboro State College in Glassboro, New Jersey.

== Recording ==
Muehleisen had written several songs and was introduced to producers Terry Cashman and Tommy West, who offered to produce an album of his songs. At that time, Jim Croce was out of the music industry and was working a series of odd jobs. Muehleisen and Croce were introduced by a mutual friend and developed an immediate and lasting rapport. With steady gigs and a growing fan base, Muehleisen invited Croce to back him up as a second guitarist at local Philadelphia-area venues just before the release of the Gingerbreadd album by Capitol Records in November 1970.

Although commercial results were minimal, Muehleisen's music and the songwriting began to have a significant impact—the emergence of a new structural sophistication and commercial appeal—on the musical development of Croce's own songwriting. The result was a sound captured by Cashman and West's sparse production on Croce's three albums—You Don't Mess Around with Jim, Life and Times, and I Got a Name, which was released posthumously.

The resulting commercial success of the music launched Croce and Muehleisen on 18 months of frequent touring, both in the United States and abroad; seven national television appearances, including The Tonight Show, American Bandstand, The Dick Cavett Show, The Midnight Special and the Helen Reddy Show; as an opening act for Randy Newman, Woody Allen, and Loggins and Messina; and numerous radio interviews. A typical concert venue featured Muehleisen and Croce in a two-guitar acoustic duet, playing to audiences sometimes as large as 10,000 people (Chicago's Ravinia Folk Festival, July 1973). Occasionally, producer Tommy West would join them onstage, typically on the TV appearances, playing the piano.

With constant touring becoming a grind, and a No. 1 record on the charts ("Bad, Bad Leroy Brown"), Muehleisen and Croce returned to New York's The Hit Factory in the summer of 1973 to record Croce's third record as a solo artist. Recording sessions were sandwiched between tour stops, and the final song was finished on September 14, 1973. Croce's last recording was a song written by Muehleisen, titled "Salon and Saloon", one of the few songs on Croce's solo albums where he was not the primary songwriter—the I Got a Name LP included two other non-Croce-written tunes.

== Death ==
Continuing to tour, Muehleisen and Croce left New York for the southeastern United States. On Thursday, September 20, 1973, they were in Natchitoches, Louisiana, at the Northwestern State University. Their entourage— Robert Elliot the pilot, Muehleisen, Croce, comedian George Stevens who was the opening act, Croce's road manager Dennis Rast, and Croce's manager and booking agent Kenneth Cortese, all arrived by small charter plane. Less than an hour after the concert, the plane crashed at 10:45 p.m. as it was taking off for the next concert in Sherman, Texas. Everyone on board was killed instantly. Muehleisen was only 24 years old. Early the following week, Muehleisen was buried in Trenton.

The official report of the accident said that the charter pilot had severe coronary artery disease, had run a portion of the three miles to the airport from a motel, and may have suffered a heart attack, causing him to crash the twin-engined Beechcraft E18S into a pecan tree at the end of a clear runway with excellent visibility.

== Guitars ==
Muehleisen had an enthusiastic preference for Martin Guitars and used a Martin D-18 and D-35 in his studio recordings, both on Gingerbreadd and on Jim Croce's three albums. Muehleisen had a natural finger-picking style that accentuated the higher registers of the Martins. Eventually both Muehleisen and Croce became some of the early artists to use Ovation guitars, known for the unique synthetic "Lyrachord Bowl" design on the back of the guitar, instruments often seen on their later television appearances. Muehleisen also added some electric guitar on I Got a Name.

== Legacy ==
On September 20, 2006, 33 years to the day of Muehleisen's death, the first domestic CD of his Gingerbreadd LP was reissued, along with a companion CD, Maury Muehleisen – Before the Ever Since, featuring early home and studio recordings. Liner notes on Gingerbreadd explain the title. In addition to early renditions of the original Gingerbreadd song lineup, the companion CD includes Muehleisen's original solo guitar recording of "Salon and Saloon" (the version sung by Croce was accompanied only by Tommy West on piano).

In an August 12, 2010, article in Inside [New] Jersey magazine, Muehleisen's sister, Mary, discussed his music and his association with Croce.
