= Jim Croce =

American singer-songwriter (1943–1973)

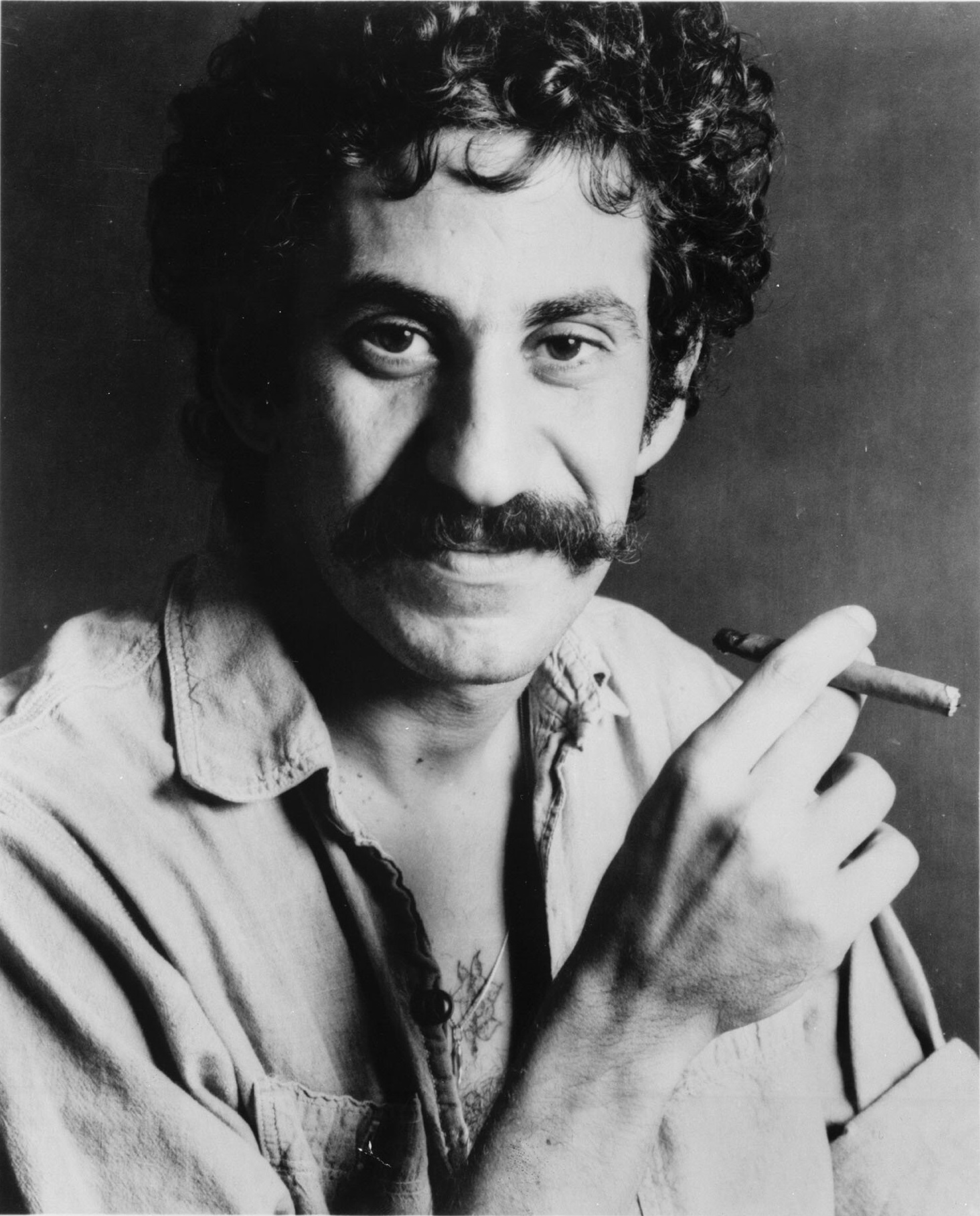
- Croce in 1972
- Born: January 10, 1943; Philadelphia, Pennsylvania, U.S.
- Died: September 20, 1973 (aged 30); Natchitoches, Louisiana, U.S.
- Spouse: Ingrid Jacobson (m. 1966)
- Children: A. J. Croce
- Musical career
- Genres: Folk; soft rock
- Occupations: Singer; songwriter
- Instruments: Vocals; guitar
- Years active: 1964–1973
- Labels: Capitol/EMI; ABC; Saja/Atlantic

Pennsylvania Historical Marker
- Official name: James Joseph "Jim" Croce (1943–1973)
- Type: Roadside
- Designated: March 30, 2022
- Website: jimcroce.com

James Joseph Croce (/ˈkroʊtʃiː/ KROH-chee; January 10, 1943 – September 20, 1973) was an American folk and rock singer-songwriter. Between 1966 and 1973, he released five studio albums and numerous singles. During this period, Croce took a series of odd jobs to pay bills while he continued to write and record songs as well as perform concerts. After Croce formed a partnership with songwriter and guitarist Maury Muehleisen in the early 1970s, his fortunes turned. Croce's breakthrough came in 1972, when his third album, You Don't Mess Around with Jim, produced three charting singles, including "Time in a Bottle", which reached number one after his death. The follow-up album Life and Times included the song "Bad, Bad Leroy Brown", the only number-one hit Croce had during his lifetime.

On September 20, 1973, Croce, Muehleisen, and four others died in a plane crash, one day before the release of the lead single from Croce's fifth album, I Got a Name, during a period of significant commercial success. His music continued to chart throughout the 1970s following his death. Croce's widow and early songwriting partner, Ingrid Jacobson, continued to write and record after his death while their son, A.J. Croce, became a singer-songwriter in the 1990s.

== Early life and education ==
Croce was born on January 10, 1943 (although some sources say 1942), in South Philadelphia, Pennsylvania, to Flora Mary (née Babusci) and James Albert Croce, Italian Americans whose parents had emigrated from Trasacco and Balsorano in Abruzzo, Italy.

Croce grew up in Drexel Hill, Upper Darby Township, Pennsylvania, 7 miles (11 km) west of Philadelphia, and attended Upper Darby High School, where he graduated in 1960. Croce then attended Malvern Preparatory School for a year before enrolling at Villanova University, where he majored in psychology and minored in German. Croce was a member of the campus singing groups the Villanova Singers and the Villanova Spires. When the Spires performed off campus or made recordings, they were known as The Coventry Lads. Croce was also a student disc jockey at WKVU, which has since become WXVU. In 1965, he graduated from Villanova with a Bachelor of Arts in Social Studies.

== Career ==
=== Early career ===
Croce did not take music seriously until he studied at Villanova, where he became a leader of the Villanova Singers, formed bands, and performed at fraternity parties, coffeehouses, and universities around Philadelphia. Croce played "anything that the people wanted to hear: blues, rock, a cappella, railroad music ... anything." His band was chosen for a foreign exchange tour of Africa, the Middle East and Yugoslavia. Croce later said, "We just ate what the people ate, lived in the woods, and played our songs. Of course they didn't speak English over there but if you mean what you're singing, people understand." On November 29, 1963, while judging a contest at the Philadelphia Convention Hall during a hootenanny, he met his future wife, Ingrid Jacobson.

In 1966, Croce released his first album, Facets, with 500 copies pressed. The album had been financed with a $500 ($4,962 in 2025 dollars) wedding gift from Croce's parents, who set a condition that the money must be spent to make an album. They hoped that Croce would abandon music after the album failed and use his college education to pursue a more traditional profession. However, the album proved to be a success, with every copy sold.

=== 1960s ===
Croce married Jacobson in 1966 and converted to Judaism from Catholicism, as she was Jewish. They were married in a traditional Jewish ceremony. That same year, Croce enlisted in the Army National Guard in New Jersey to avoid being drafted and deployed to Vietnam, and served on active duty for four months, leaving for duty a week after his honeymoon. Croce, who tended to resist authority, endured basic training twice. He said that he would be prepared if "there's ever a war where we have to defend ourselves with mops."

From the mid-1960s to the early 1970s, Croce and his wife performed as a duo. Initially, their performances included songs by artists such as Ian & Sylvia, Gordon Lightfoot, Joan Baez, and Arlo Guthrie, but the couple eventually began writing their own music. During this time, Croce secured his first long-term gig, at a suburban bar and steakhouse in Lima, Pennsylvania, called the Riddle Paddock. Croce's set list covered several genres, including blues, country, rock and roll, and folk.

In 1968, the Croces were encouraged by the record producer Tommy West, a fellow Villanova alumnus, to move to New York City. The couple spent time in the Kingsbridge section of the Bronx and recorded their first album with Capitol Records. According to Jacobson, over the next two years, they drove more than 300,000 miles (480,000 kilometres), playing small clubs and concerts on the college concert circuit to promote their album Jim & Ingrid Croce.

Becoming disillusioned by the music business and New York, the Croces sold all but one guitar to pay the rent and returned to the Pennsylvania countryside, settling in an old farm in Lyndell. Croce played for $25 a night ($207 in 2025 dollars) and earned additional money by taking odd jobs such as driving trucks, construction work, and teaching guitar while continuing to write songs. Croce often wrote about the characters whom he would meet at local bars and truck stops and his experiences at work. These songs included "Big Wheel" and "Workin' at the Car Wash Blues."

=== 1970s ===
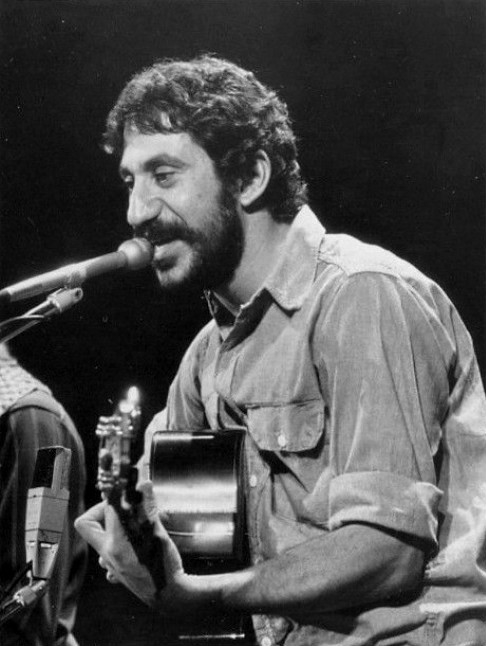
Croce appears on In Concert

Eventually, the Croces returned to Philadelphia, and Croce decided to be "serious" about becoming a productive member of society. He said: "I'd worked construction crews, and I'd been a welder while I was in college. But I'd rather do other things than get burned." Croce's determination led to a job at Philadelphia R&B AM radio station WHAT, where he translated commercials into "soul". Croce said: "I'd sell airtime to Bronco's Poolroom and then write the spot: 'You wanna be cool, and you wanna shoot pool ... dig it.'"

In 1970, Croce met classically trained pianist-guitarist and singer-songwriter Maury Muehleisen through producer Joe Salviuolo, a friend of Croce's since college. Salviuolo had met Muehleisen when he was teaching at Glassboro State College in New Jersey and brought Croce and Muehleisen together at the production office of Tommy West and Terry Cashman in New York City. Initially, Croce backed Muehleisen on guitar, but their roles gradually reversed, with Muehleisen adding a lead guitar to Croce's music.

When his wife became pregnant, Croce became more determined to make music his profession. Croce sent a cassette of his new songs to a friend and producer in New York City in the hope that he could secure a record deal. After their son, Adrian James "A.J.", was born on September 28, 1971, Ingrid stayed at home while Croce toured to promote his music.

In 1972, Croce signed a three-record contract with ABC Records, releasing two albums, You Don't Mess Around with Jim and Life and Times. The singles "You Don't Mess Around with Jim", "Operator (That's Not the Way It Feels)", and "Time in a Bottle" all received airplay. That same year, the Croces moved to San Diego. Croce began appearing on television, including on American Bandstand on August 12, his national debut, The Tonight Show on August 14, and The Dick Cavett Show on September 20 and 21.

Croce began touring the United States with Muehleisen, performing in large coffeehouses, on college campuses, and at folk festivals. However, his financial situation remained precarious. The record company had fronted him the money to record, and much of his earnings went to repay the advance. In February 1973, Croce and Muehleisen traveled to Europe, performing in London, Paris, Amsterdam, Monte Carlo, Zurich, and Dublin, receiving encouraging reviews. Croce made television appearances on The Midnight Special, which he cohosted on June 15, and The Helen Reddy Show on July 19. Croce's biggest single, "Bad, Bad Leroy Brown", reached No. 1 on the American charts in July. He appeared on a September 14, 1973 airing of The Midnight Special where he received a gold record and indicated that he would be hosting the show on the November 2, 1973 broadcast. The airing of The Midnight Special on January 4, 1974, reflected on Jim and in remembrance replayed the previous September 14, 1973 tape of "Bad, Bad Leroy Brown".

From July 16 through August 4, Croce and Muehleisen returned to London and performed on The Old Grey Whistle Test, on which they sang "Lover's Cross" and "Workin' at the Car Wash Blues" from their upcoming album I Got a Name. Croce finished recording the album just a week before his death. While on tour, Croce grew increasingly homesick and decided to take a break from music and settle with his family when his Life and Times tour ended. In a letter to Ingrid that arrived after his death, Croce told her that he had decided to quit music and wanted to write short stories and movie scripts as a career and withdraw from public life.

== Death ==
On the evening of Thursday, September 20, 1973, during Croce's Life and Times tour, which had been scheduled for 45 dates, and the day before his single "I Got a Name" was released, Croce and five others were killed when their chartered Beechcraft E18S crashed shortly after takeoff from the Natchitoches Regional Airport in Natchitoches, Louisiana. Croce was only 30 years old. Others killed in the crash were the pilot, Robert N. Elliott; Croce's bandmate Maury Muehleisen; manager and booking agent Kenneth D. Cortese; road manager Dennis Rast; and George Stevens, a comedian. The crash occurred an hour after Croce had finished a concert at Northwestern State University's Prather Coliseum in Natchitoches. They were headed for Sherman, Texas, for a concert at Austin College.

An investigation by the National Transportation Safety Board (NTSB) identified the probable cause as the pilot's failure to see obstructions because of physical impairment and fog that had reduced his vision. The 57-year-old pilot suffered from severe coronary artery disease and had run three miles (4.8 km) to the airport from a motel. He had an ATP certificate, 14,290 hours' total flight time, and 2,190 hours in the Beech 18 type airplane.

Croce was buried at Haym Salomon Memorial Park in Frazer, Pennsylvania.

== Legacy ==
The album I Got a Name was released on December 1, 1973. The posthumous release included three hits: "Workin' at the Car Wash Blues", "I'll Have to Say I Love You in a Song", and the title song, which had been used as the theme to the film The Last American Hero, released two months prior to his death. "I'll Have to Say I Love You in a Song" reached No. 9 on the singles chart.

While ABC had not originally released the song "Time in a Bottle" as a single, Croce's untimely death lent its lyrics, dealing with mortality and the wish to have more time, an additional resonance. The song subsequently received a large amount of airplay as an album track, and demand for a single release built. When it was eventually issued as one, "Time in a Bottle" became Croce's second and final No. 1 hit. After the single finished its two-week run at the top in early January 1974, the album You Don't Mess Around with Jim became No. 1 for five weeks. Seven weeks after its release, I Got a Name reached No. 2, behind You Don't Mess Around with Jim.

A greatest hits album titled Photographs & Memories was released in 1974. Later posthumous releases have included Home Recordings: Americana, The Faces I've Been, Jim Croce: Classic Hits, Down the Highway, Have You Heard: Jim Croce Live, and DVD and CD releases of his television performances. In 1990, Croce was inducted into the Songwriters Hall of Fame.

Queen's 1974 album Sheer Heart Attack included the song "Bring Back That Leroy Brown"; its title and lyrics reference Croce's "Bad, Bad Leroy Brown".

In 1996, Ingrid Croce published the cookbook "Thyme In a Bottle", a play on the title Time in a Bottle. In 2012, she co-wrote with Jimmy Rock the memoir I Got a Name: The Jim Croce Story.

In 1985, Ingrid opened Croce's Restaurant & Jazz Bar, a project she had jokingly discussed with Croce, in the historic Gaslamp Quarter in downtown San Diego. She owned and managed it until its closure on December 31, 2013. In December 2013, Ingrid Croce opened another restaurant, Croce's Park West, on 5th Avenue in the Bankers Hill neighborhood near Balboa Park. She closed it in January 2016.

In 2022, a Pennsylvania Historical Marker honoring Croce was installed outside his farmhouse in Lyndell.

== Discography ==
Studio albums

- Facets (1966)
- Jim & Ingrid Croce (1969)
- You Don't Mess Around with Jim (1972)
- Life and Times (1973)
- I Got a Name (1973)
