= Terry Cashman =

American record producer and singer-songwriter

- Born: Dennis Minogue; July 5, 1941 (age 84); New York City, U.S.
- Occupation(s): Record producer, singer-songwriter

Terry Cashman (born Dennis Minogue; July 5, 1941) is an American record producer and singer-songwriter, best known for his 1981 hit, "Talkin' Baseball". While the song is well recognized today and allowed Cashman the chance to meet the featured players, it was all but ignored by typical Top 40 radio during its chart life, making only the Billboard Adult Contemporary chart.

== Early life ==
Cashman was born in New York City and grew up in northern Manhattan a fan of the New York Giants (and subsequently the San Francisco Giants) until he became a New York Mets fan when Willie Mays was traded to them in 1972.

== Career ==
Cashman was the lead singer for a band called The Chevrons, in the late 1950s through the early 1960s. He also played Minor League Baseball in the Detroit Tigers organization at around the same time.

In 1967, Cashman teamed up with Gene Pistilli and Tommy West to form the pop-folk group Cashman, Pistilli and West. Their debut album, Bound to Happen (1967), included the Cashman-Pistilli composition "Sunday Will Never Be the Same", a No. 9 hit on the Billboard Hot 100 for Spanky and Our Gang that year, and No. 7 in Canada.

In 1969, Cashman, Pistilli and West, under the name Buchanan Brothers, peaked at No. 22 on the Billboard Hot 100 and No. 15 in Canada with "Medicine Man". The follow-up, "Son of a Lovin' Man", peaked at No. 61 on the Hot 100 and No. 50 in Canada. Their single "The Last Time" reached No.106 in BB and No. 88 in Canada in January 1970. Cashman, Pistilli and West (later reduced to Cashman & West) enjoyed modest success, recording six albums through 1975. In 1972 their album A Song or Two reached No. 168 on the Billboard Top LP's & Tape.

In November 1972, Cashman & West's song "American City Suite" hit No. 27 on the Hot 100 and No. 25 on the Canadian RPM chart. In 1973, one of the Partridge family episodes featured "Sunshine Eyes", with the music and lyrics as by Terry Cashman and T.P. West. The Cashman-West team also produced all the hit recordings of singer-songwriter Jim Croce. In 1975, they launched Lifesong Records, which had hits including "Shannon" by Henry Gross and "Ariel" by Dean Friedman.

Inspired by a picture he had received of Willie Mays, Duke Snider, Joe DiMaggio and Mickey Mantle, Cashman decided to write a song dedicated to 1950s baseball. The popular choral refrain in the song "Talkin' Baseball" — "Willie, Mickey, and The Duke" — immediately struck a chord with fans in 1981, who were disappointed by the Major League Baseball strike that summer. Cashman performed the song at the 1982 induction ceremony where he also performed his song Cooperstown, which is dedicated to the Hall of Fame.

Cashman has since recorded multiple versions of the song for different Major League Baseball teams. Because of this, he is now known as "The Balladeer of Baseball". He also recorded a parody of the song in 1992, "Talkin' Softball", for the end credits of The Simpsons episode "Homer at the Bat".

== National honors ==
The Baseball Hall of Fame and Museum honored Cashman in summer 2011 as part of its induction weekend. Cashman performed his ballpark anthem once again during ceremonies on July 23, 2011, a day before Roberto Alomar, Bert Blyleven and Pat Gillick were inducted.

In 2011, he was inducted into the Irish American Baseball Hall of Fame.
