= Jerry Reed discography =

- Studio albums: 35
- Soundtrack albums: 2
- Live albums: 2
- Compilation albums: 6
- Singles: 59
- Music videos: 2
- Collaborations: 5
- No. 1 Singles: 4

Jerry Reed was an American singer. His discography comprises 50 albums and 59 singles.

== Albums ==
=== 1960s ===
Title	Details	Peak positions
Title	Details	US Country
The Unbelievable Guitar and Voice of Jerry Reed	Release date: February 1967; Label: RCA Victor	—
Nashville Underground	Release date: 1968; Label: RCA Victor	31
Alabama Wild Man	Release date: 1968; Label: RCA Victor	31
Better Things in Life	Release date: 1969; Label: RCA Victor	—
Jerry Reed Explores Guitar Country	Release date: 1969; Label: RCA Victor	41
"—" denotes releases that did not chart

=== 1970s ===
Title	Details	Peak chart positions		
Title	Details	US Country	US	AUS
Cookin'	Release date: 1970; Label: RCA Victor	33	194	—
Georgia Sunshine	Release date: 1970; Label: RCA Victor	10	102	—
When You're Hot, You're Hot^{[A]}	Release date: 1971; Label: RCA Victor	2	45	46
Ko-Ko Joe	Release date: 1971; Label: RCA Victor	7	153	—
Smell the Flowers	Release date: 1972; Label: RCA Victor	18	196	—
Jerry Reed	Release date: 1972; Label: RCA Victor	22	201	—
Hot a'Mighty!	Release date: 1973; Label: RCA Victor	9	—	—
Lord, Mr. Ford	Release date: 1973; Label: RCA Victor	4	183	—
The Uptown Poker Club	Release date: 1973; Label: RCA Victor	13	—	—
A Good Woman's Love	Release date: 1974; Label: RCA Victor	28	—	—
Mind Your Love	Release date: 1975; Label: RCA Victor	—	—	—
Red Hot Picker	Release date: 1975; Label: RCA Victor	33	—	—
Both Barrels	Release date: 1976; Label: RCA Victor	40	—	—
Jerry Reed Rides Again	Release date: 1977; Label: RCA Victor	41	—	—
Sweet Love Feelings	Release date: 1978; Label: RCA Victor	47	—	—
Half Singin' and Half Pickin'	Release date: 1979; Label: RCA Victor	49	—	—
"—" denotes releases that did not chart

=== 1980s ===
Title	Details	Peak chart positions	
Title	Details	US Country	US
Jerry Reed Sings Jim Croce	Release date: April 1980; Label: RCA Victor	56	—
Texas Bound and Flyin'	Release date: 1980; Label: RCA Victor	43	208
Dixie Dreams	Release date: 1981; Label: RCA Victor	—	—
The Man with the Golden Thumb	Release date: 1982; Label: RCA Victor	10	—
The Bird	Release date: 1982; Label: RCA Victor	20	—
Ready	Release date: 1983; Label: RCA Victor	34	—
My Best to You	Release date: 1984; Label: JRP Records	—	—
Lookin' at You	Release date: 1986; Label: Capitol Records	—	—
"—" denotes releases that did not chart

=== 1990s ===
Title	Details	Peak positions
Title	Details	US Country
Flyin' High	Release date: 1995; Label: Southern Tracks	—
Pickin'	Release date: 1999; Label: Southern Tracks	—
"—" denotes releases that did not chart

=== 2000s ===
Title	Details
Finger Dancing	Release date: 2000; Label: R2K Records
Jerry Reed Visits Hit Row	Release date: 2000; Label: R2K Records
Let's Git It On	Release date: 2006; Label: R2K Records
The Gallant Few	Release date: April 18, 2008; Label: RIIK Records; Reed's last studio album, issued five months before his death; Produced to raise funds for injured American veterans, The Gallant Few is currently unavailable on CD or streaming; "American Veteran," "Going Home," and "Wounded Warrior" are written and sang by Reed; Opening song "Warrior Spirit" was composed by Reed but performed by the Trevecca Nazarene Men's Choir where Reed attended church; "Boys of '44" was previously released on Let's Git It On; "Stars and Stripes Forever" is identical to the Finger Dancing version; Seidina Reed contributed a new version of her father's "Today Is Mine"; Reed does not appear on James "Moby" Carney's "'Til the Fourth of July," Chester Lee's "American Warrior," and Gordon Kennedy's "You" although his publishing company, Sixteen Stars Music, holds the copyright for Carney and Lee's tunes

== Soundtracks ==
Title	Details	Peak chart positions	
Title	Details	US Country	US
Smokey and the Bandit: Music from the Motion Picture	Release date: 1977; Label: MCA Records	—	—
What Comes Around	Release date: 1985; Label: Capitol Records; Reed directed, produced, starred, and scored the soundtrack for this little-seen indie film about a substance-addicted country singer who exacts revenge on his crooked manager	—	—

== Collaborations ==
Title	Details	Peak chart positions	
Title	Details	US Country	US
Me and Jerry (with Chet Atkins)	Release date: 1970; Label: RCA Records	13	—
Me and Chet (with Chet Atkins)	Release date: 1972; Label: RCA Records	24	—
Sneakin' Around (with Chet Atkins)	Release date: October 1991; Label: Columbia Records	68	—
Old Dogs (with Waylon Jennings, Mel Tillis and Bobby Bare)	Release date: December 1, 1998; Label: Atlantic Records	—	—
Old Dogs Volume Two (with Waylon Jennings, Mel Tillis and Bobby Bare)	Release date: 1998; Label: Atlantic Records	—	—

== Live Albums ==
Title	Details	Peak chart positions	
Title	Details	US Country	US
Jerry Reed Live! featuring Hot Stuff	Release date: 1979; Label: RCA Victor	45	—
Jerry Reed "Live!" (Still)	Release date: 2005; Label: R2K Records	—	—

== Compilations ==
Title	Details	Peak chart positions	
Title	Details	US Country	US
I'm Movin' On	Release date: 1971; Label: Harmony Records (Columbia)	—	—
The Best of Jerry Reed	Release date: 1972; Label: RCA Victor	4	116
Oh What a Woman!	Release date: 1972; Label: RCA Victor	—	—
Just Us Three (with Freddie Hart and Sammi Smith)	Release date: 1972; Label: Harmony Victor	—	—
Alabama Wild Man	Release date: 1976; Label: Pickwick Records	—	—
East Bound and Down	Release date: 1977; Label: RCA Victor; The title cut, "The Bandit," and "The Legend" were lifted from the "Smokey and the Bandit" soundtrack; The remaining seven tracks had also been previously released	10	203
Jerry Reed's Greatest Hits	Release date: 1984; Label: RCA Victor	—	—
Collector's Series	Release date: 1985; Label: RCA Victor	—	—
The Essential Jerry Reed	Release date: 1995; Label: RCA Records	—	—
Super Hits	Release date: 1997; Label: RCA Records	—	—
Old Dogs Greatest Hits (with Waylon Jennings, Mel Tillis and Bobby Bare)	Release date: 1998; Label: Atlantic Records	—	—
Here I Am (Capitol Classics 1955-1958)	Release date: 1999; Label: Bear Family Records; Reed's complete rockabilly tenure on Capitol	—	—
Guitar Man	Release date: 1999; Label: RCA/BMG Camden International	—	—
RCA Country Legends	Release date: 2001; Label: RCA/Buddha Records	—	—
When You're Hot...The Very Best of Jerry Reed: 1967-1983	Release date: 2009; Label: Raven Records (Australia)	—	—

== Singles ==
=== 1950s-1960s ===
Year	Single	Peak chart positions			Album
Year	Single	US Country	US	CAN Country	Album
1955	"If the Good Lord's Willing and the Creek Don't Rise"	—	—	—	—N/a
1959	"Soldier's Joy"	—	115	—	—N/a
1961	"Love and War (Ain't Much Difference in the Two)"	—	117	—	—N/a
1962	"Goodnight, Irene"	—	79	—	—N/a
1962	"Hully Gully Guitar"	—	99	—	—N/a
1965	"If I Don't Live It Up"	—	—	—	—N/a
1965	"Fightin' for the U.S.A."	—	—	—	—N/a
1967	"Guitar Man"	53	—	—	The Unbelievable Guitar and Voice of Jerry Reed
1967	"Tupelo Mississippi Flash"	15	—	14	Nashville Underground
1968	"Remembering"	14	—	16	Nashville Underground
1968	"Alabama Wild Man"	48	—	—	Alabama Wild Man
1968	"Oh What a Woman!"	60	—	—	Better Things in Life
1969	"There's Better Things in Life"	20	—	—	Better Things in Life
1969	"Are You from Dixie ('Cause I'm from Dixie Too)"	11	—	—	Jerry Reed Explores Guitar Country
1969	"A Thing Called Love"	—	—	—	Nashville Underground
"—" denotes releases that did not chart

=== 1970s ===
Year	Single	Peak chart positions							Album
Year	Single	US Country	US	AUS	CAN Country	CAN	CAN AC	NLD	Album
1970	"Talk About the Good Times"	14	—	—	—	—	—	—	Georgia Sunshine
1970	"Georgia Sunshine"	16	—	—	—	—	—	—	Georgia Sunshine
1970	"The Preacher and the Bear"	16	—	—	—	—	—	—	Georgia Sunshine
1970	"Amos Moses"	16	8	34	—	2	—	— (Note: "Amos Moses" did not chart in the Dutch Top 30 singles chart but spent 1 week in the Single Tip chart peaking at number 9.)	Georgia Sunshine
1971	"When You're Hot, You're Hot"^{[B]}	1	9	34	1	4	18	—	When You're Hot, You're Hot
1971	"Ko-Ko Joe"	11	51	—	3	33	26	—	Ko-Ko Joe
1972	"Another Puff"	27	65	—	19	83	—	—	Ko-Ko Joe
1972	"Smell the Flowers"	24	—	—	45	—	—	—	Smell the Flowers
1972	"Alabama Wild Man" (remake)	22	62	—	12	79	—	—	Jerry Reed
1972	"You Took All the Ramblin' Out of Me"	18	—	—	8	—	—	—	Hot a'Mighty!
1973	"Lord, Mr. Ford"	1	68	97	2	—	25	—	Lord, Mr. Ford
1973	"The Uptown Poker Club"	25	—	—	16	—	—	—	The Uptown Poker Club
1974	"The Crude Oil Blues"	13	91	—	17	91	—	—	A Good Woman's Love
1974	"A Good Woman's Love"	12	—	—	17	—	—	—	A Good Woman's Love
1974	"Boogie Woogie Rock and Roll"	72	—	—	—	—	—	—	The Hits of Jerry Reed
1974	"Let's Sing Our Song"	18	—	—	21	—	—	—	Mind Your Love
1975	"Mind Your Love"	64	—	—	—	—	—	—	Mind Your Love
1975	"The Telephone"	65	—	—	47	—	—	—	Mind Your Love
1975	"You Got a Lock on Me"	60	104	—	—	—	—	—	Red Hot Picker
1976	"Gator"	54	—	—	—	—	—	—	Both Barrels
1976	"Remembering"	57	—	—	—	—	—	—	Both Barrels
1977	"Semolita"	19	—	—	21	—	—	—	Jerry Reed Rides Again
1977	"With His Pants in His Hand"	68	—	—	—	—	—	—	Jerry Reed Rides Again
1977	"East Bound and Down"	2	103	—	2	—	—	—	Smokey and the Bandit: Music from the Motion Picture
1977	"You Know What" (with daughter Seidina Reed)	20	—	—	35	—	—	—	Sweet Love Feelings
1978	"Sweet Love Feelings"	39	—	—	—	—	—	—	Sweet Love Feelings
1978	"I Love You (What Can I Say)"	10	—	—	7	—	—	—	Sweet Love Feelings
1978	"Gimme Back My Blues"	14	—	—	21	—	—	—	Half Singin' and Half Pickin'
1979	"Second-Hand Satin Lady (and a Bargain Basement Boy)"	18	—	—	17	—	—	—	Half Singin' and Half Pickin'
1979	"(Who Was the Man Who Put) the Line in Gasoline"	40	—	—	65	—	—	—	Jerry Reed Live! featuring Hot Stuff
1979	"Hot Stuff"	67	—	—	—	—	—	—	Jerry Reed Live! featuring Hot Stuff
1979	"Sugar-Foot Rag"	12	—	—	13	—	—	—	Texas Bound and Flyin'
"—" denotes releases that did not chart

=== 1980s–2000s ===
Year	Single	Peak chart positions		Album
Year	Single	US Country	CAN Country	Album
1980	"Age"	36	—	Jerry Reed Sings Jim Croce
1980	"The Family Friendly Inn"	64	—	Texas Bound and Flyin'
1980	"Texas Bound and Flyin'"	26	29	Texas Bound and Flyin'
1981	"Caffein (sic), Nicotine, Benzedrine (And Wish Me Luck)"	80	—	Texas Bound and Flyin'
1981	"The Testimony of Soddy Hoe"	87	—	Dixie Dreams
1981	"Good Friends Make Good Lovers"	84	—	Dixie Dreams
1981	"Patches"	30	—	The Man with the Golden Thumb
1982	"The Man with the Golden Thumb"	32	41	The Man with the Golden Thumb
1982	"She Got the Goldmine (I Got the Shaft)"^{[C]}	1	3	The Man with the Golden Thumb
1982	"The Bird"	2	1	The Bird
1983	"Down on the Corner"	13	11	The Bird
1983	"Good Ole Boys"	16	31	Ready
1983	"I'm a Slave"	58	—	Ready
1985	"What Comes Around"	—	—	What Comes Around
1986	"Let It Go"	—	—	What Comes Around
1986	"This Missin' You's a Whole Lotta Fun"	—	—	Lookin' at You
1986	"You Can't Get the Hell Out of Texas"	—	—	Lookin' at You
1995	"Tryin' Stuff On"	—	—	Flyin' High
1998	"My Priscilla"	—	—	Pickin'
2007	"Christmas at the Mall"	—	—	digital-only single
"—" denotes releases that did not chart

== Other singles ==
=== Guest singles ===
Year	Single	Artist	Peak chart positions		Album
Year	Single	Artist	US Country	CAN Country	Album
1967	"Chet's Tune"	Some of Chet's Friends	38	—	—N/a
1980	"Lunchbox"	Alvin and the Chipmunks	—	—	Urban Chipmunk
1983	"Hold On, I'm Comin'"	Waylon Jennings	20	7	Waylon and Company
1985	"One Big Family"	Heart of Nashville	61	—	—N/a
1999	"Still Gonna Die"	Old Dogs	—	—	Old Dogs
"—" denotes releases that did not chart

=== B-sides ===
Year	B-side	Peak chart positions		Original A-side
Year	B-side	US Country	CAN Country	Original A-side
1970	"The Preacher and the Bear"	flip	—	"Amos Moses"
1977	"(I'm Just a) Red Neck in a Rock and Roll Bar"	flip	—	"East Bound and Down"
1978	"High Rollin'"	flip	—	"I Love You (What Can I Say)"
1980	"Workin' at the Carwash Blues"	flip	40	"Age"
1983	"She's Ready for Someone to Love Her"	flip	—	"Good Ole Boys"
"—" denotes releases that did not chart

== Music videos ==
Year	Video	Director
1992	"The Claw" (with Chet Atkins)	Deaton-Flanigen
1998	"Amos Moses"	Les Claypool

== Notes ==
- A When You're Hot, You're Hot also peaked at number 33 on the RPM Top Albums chart in Canada.
- B "When You're Hot, You're Hot" also peaked at number 6 on the U.S. Billboard Hot Adult Contemporary Tracks.
- C "She Got the Goldmine (I Got the Shaft)" also peaked at number 57 on the U.S. Billboard Hot 100.
