= Alabama Wild Man =

Alabama Wild Man may refer to:

- Alabama Wild Man (song), a song by Jerry Reed, released as a single in 1972
- Alabama Wild Man (album), a 1968 album by Jerry Reed, featuring the song
