= Thing Called Love =

Thing Called Love may refer to:

== Music ==
- "Thing Called Love", a song by the trance group Above & Beyond from their 2011 album Group Therapy
- "Thing Called Love", a song by John Hiatt from his 1987 album Bring the Family, covered by Bonnie Raitt for her 1989 album Nick of Time
- A Thing Called Love" (Jessica Anne's Special), a 2018 extended play by the Happy Hardscore D-Crew 2 US
- A Thing Called Love, a 1972 album by country singer Johnny Cash
  - ""A Thing Called Love" (song)," the title song written by Jerry Reed from the above Johnny Cash album
- "Crazy Little Thing Called Love," a 1980 song by the English rock band Queen
- I Believe in a Thing Called Love (EP), an extended play (EP) recording by the rock group The Darkness, released in 2002
  - "I Believe in a Thing Called Love," a song by the English rock group The Darkness from the above EP and their 2003 album Permission to Land
- "What Is This Thing Called Love?," a 1929 popular song written by Cole Porter, for the musical Wake Up and Dream

== Other uses ==
- The Thing Called Love, a 1993 movie starring River Phoenix and Sandra Bullock
- "What is This Thing Called Love?" (short story), a 1961 science fiction short story by Isaac Asimov
