= The Delegates =

Novelty Song Group

The Delegates were a novelty song group who scored a hit record, "Convention '72".

== Creation ==
The Delegates were the creation of Bob DeCarlo, morning disc jockey at KQV in Pittsburgh. DeCarlo was approached by local record moguls Nick Cenci and Nick Kousaleous, to make a novelty record; the trio assembled "Convention '72," a "break-in" record which consisted of DeCarlo imitating such TV reporters as Walter Cronkite ("Walter Klondike"), Chet Huntley ("Sidney Bruntley" as a flamboyantly gay reporter), David Brinkley ("David Stinkley"), and Harry Reasoner ("Larry Reasoning"). While attending a joint "Get Together" convention of Republicans and Democrats alike, the reporters asked questions of current politicians involved in that year's presidential election (such as Thomas Eagleton, Sargent Shriver, Spiro Agnew, Richard Nixon, Edward Kennedy, George McGovern, Martha Mitchell, Jane Fonda and Henry Kissinger); their responses were snippets of hit records of the day, in a manner made famous by Dickie Goodman.

== Sampled records (with original artist) ==
"Troglodyte (Cave Man)" (Jimmy Castor Bunch)

"I Gotcha" (Joe Tex)

"Lean on Me" (Bill Withers)

"Sealed with a Kiss" (Bobby Vinton)

"The Happiest Girl in the Whole U.S.A." (Donna Fargo)

"Jungle Fever" (The Chakachas)

"Alone Again (Naturally)" (Gilbert O'Sullivan)

"Coconut" (Nilsson)

"A Horse with No Name" (America)

"Take It Easy (In Your Mind)" (Jerry Reed)

"(If Loving You Is Wrong) I Don't Want to Be Right" (Luther Ingram)

"Back Stabbers" (The O'Jays)

"Liar" (Three Dog Night)

"How Can You Mend a Broken Heart" (Bee Gees)

"Mr. Big Stuff" (Jean Knight)

"Gypsys, Tramps & Thieves" (Cher)

"(Last Night) I Didn't Get to Sleep at All" (The 5th Dimension)

"Double Barrel" (Dave and Ansell Collins)

"The Candy Man" (Sammy Davis Jr.)

"I Don't Know How to Love Him" (Yvonne Elliman)

== Chart performance ==
Released on the Mainstream Records label (with the instrumental "Funky Butt" on the flip side), "Convention '72" climbed the Billboard Pop Singles chart just as the campaign was heating up, finally peaking at number 8 on the week ending November 18. After the election, the Delegates issued a follow-up, "(After The Election) Richard M. Nixon Face The Issues" (b/w "Touzie's Blues"), but it was not a hit. The ad hoc "group" also recorded a full self-titled album, which included the hit single, "interviews" with such figures as Lyndon B. Johnson and Ramsey Clark, as well as a cover of the Frank Sinatra hit "My Way", sung in Sidney's lisping voice.

After leaving Pittsburgh, Bob DeCarlo worked at stations in Atlanta, Dallas, San Diego, Miami and Tampa before retiring in 2013.

== See also ==
- Super Fly Meets Shaft, comedic 1973 break-in record with similar news and politics formatting
