= Stay Away (Elvis Presley song) =

Single by Elvis Presley
- A-side: "U.S. Male"; "Stay Away"
- Released: February 27, 1968
- Recorded: January 15, 1968
- Genre: Rock and Roll, Pop
- Length: 2:07
- Label: RCA Victor
- Songwriters: Sid Tepper; Roy C. Bennett

Elvis Presley singles chronology
"Guitar Man" (1968)	"U.S. Male" / "Stay Away" (1968)	"We Call on Him" / "You'll Never Walk Alone" (1968)

"Stay Away" is a song first recorded by Elvis Presley as part of the soundtrack for his 1968 motion picture Stay Away, Joe.

== History ==
=== Writing ===
The song was written by Sid Tepper and Roy C. Bennett and published by Gladys Music, Inc. It is based on the traditional song "Greensleeves", which Presley requested to rework for him. The first version the songwriters made (in 1967) was titled "Evergreen", but Elvis never recorded it.

=== Recording ===
Elvis Presley recorded "Stay Away" during a non-movie recording session on Monday January 15, 1968.

=== Release ===
The song was released on a single as a flip side to "U.S. Male" in 1968. "Stay Away" peaked at number 67 on the Billboard Hot 100, while "U.S. Male" peaked at number 28.

== Charts ==
Chart (1968)	Peak position
US Billboard Hot 100	67
