= Papa Was a Good Man =

Song by Johnny Cash

Single by Johnny Cash

from the album A Thing Called Love
- A-side: "Papa Was a Good Man" "I Promise You"
- Released: 1971
- Genre: country
- Label: Columbia
- Songwriter: Hal Bynum
- Producer: Larry Butler

Johnny Cash singles chronology
"Singing in Viet Nam Talking Blues" (1971)	"Papa Was a Good Man" (1971)	"A Thing Called Love" (1971)

Audio
- "Papa Was a Good Man" on YouTube

"Papa Was a Good Man" is a song written by songwriter Hal Bynum.

Released in September 1971 as a single (Columbia 4-45460, with "I Promise You" on the opposite side) by Johnny Cash, the song reached #16 on U.S. Billboard's country chart and #104 on Billboard's Bubbling Under the Hot 100.

Both "I Promise You" (which is "a promise of devotion to June") and "Papa Was a Good Man" are part of Johnny Cash's 1972 album A Thing Called Love.

== Analysis ==
"Papa" is told from the perspective of a son whose father is struggling with alcoholism. It was the lowest charting of the three releases from the album, peaking at #16 Country and #104 Pop. It featured additional vocals from the choir of the Evangel Temple, the Nashville church Cash was now attending, pushing the song close to the point of overproduction.

— C. Eric Banister. Johnny Cash FAQ: All That's Left to Know About the Man in Black

== Track listing ==
7" single (Columbia 4-45460, 1971)
No.	Title	Writer(s)	Length
1.	"Papa Was a Good Man"	H. Bynum	2:35
2.	"I Promise You"	J. Cash	2:58

== Charts ==
Chart (1971)	Peak position
US Bubbling Under Hot 100 (Billboard)	104
US Hot Country Songs (Billboard)	18
