= The Crude Oil Blues =

Single by Jerry Reed

from the album A Good Woman's Love
- B-side: "Pickie, Pickie, Pickie"
- Released: February 4, 1974
- Genre: Country
- Length: 2:32
- Label: RCA
- Songwriter: Jerry Reed
- Producers: Chet Atkins; Jerry Reed

Jerry Reed singles chronology
"The Uptown Poker Club" (1973)	"The Crude Oil Blues" (1974)	"A Good Woman's Love" (1974)

"The Crude Oil Blues" is a song written and recorded by American country artist Jerry Reed. It was released in February 1974 as the lead single from the album, A Good Woman's Love. The song reached peaks of number 13 on the U.S. country chart and number 91 on the Billboard Hot 100.

== Chart performance ==
Chart (1974)	Peak position
U.S. Billboard Hot Country Singles	13
U.S. Billboard Hot 100	91
Canadian RPM Country Tracks	17
Canadian RPM Top Singles	91
