= She Got the Goldmine (I Got the Shaft) =

Single by Jerry Reed

from the album The Man with the Golden Thumb
- Released: June 28, 1982
- Recorded: 1982
- Genre: Country
- Length: 3:16
- Label: RCA
- Songwriter(s): Tim DuBois
- Producer(s): Rick Hall

Jerry Reed singles chronology
"The Man with the Golden Thumb" (1982)	"She Got the Goldmine (I Got the Shaft)" (1982)	"The Bird" (1982)

"She Got the Goldmine (I Got the Shaft)" is a song written by Tim DuBois and recorded by American country music singer Jerry Reed. It was released in June 1982 as the third and final single from the album, The Man with the Golden Thumb. A satire on divorce, the song was Reed's third and final No. 1 country hit in the late summer of 1982, and one of his signature tunes.

== Content ==
The song is a tongue-in-cheek reflection on the recent divorce of a blue-collar worker who, in 1963, asked his girlfriend to marry him simply because he couldn't stand his own cooking. In hindsight, the man now realizes that he wouldn't have married her if he had known it was going to screw up the rest of his life. Though the first few years were good, the "lust" died down after they had children. With this in mind, the man is not surprised when he comes home one day to find all the locks have been changed and his suitcase is sitting on the porch with an attached note saying, "Goodbye, turkey! My attorney will be in touch."

When his day in court comes, the man is willing to give his soon-to-be-ex "her fair share," but it turns out to be far more than expected; the judge essentially throws the book at the man, garnishing everything of value he owns, awarding the woman the house, both cars, the TV and full custody of the kids, and then ordering the man to pay alimony, child support and court fees, which "adds up to more than this cowboy makes". While his ex is now "living like a queen", the man is forced to live on bologna and work two jobs just to cover the expenses, all the while asking himself, "Why didn't you just learn how to cook??"

The song ends with a spoken-word epilogue, in which the man declares to the judge that he no longer needs his billfold; because of all the rulings against him, his net income is now so low that he qualifies for food stamps. The judge immediately finds him in contempt of court at this revelation. (This is a callback to Reed's 1971 hit song "When You're Hot, You're Hot", which ended similarly when Reed threatened the judge.)

== Charts ==
"She Got the Goldmine" spent two weeks at No. 1 on the Billboard Hot Country Singles chart in September 1982, and spent a total of twelve weeks on that chart's Top 40.

=== Weekly charts ===
Chart (1982)	Peak position
US Billboard Hot 100	57
US Hot Country Songs (Billboard)	1
Canadian RPM Country Tracks	3

=== Year-end charts ===
Chart (1982)	Position
US Hot Country Songs (Billboard)	7

== Use in media ==
"She Got The Goldmine" was used in the 2010 film The Bounty Hunter, during the scene where Milo searches Nicole's apartment.

In 1987, Reed, guest-starring on Dolly Parton's TV show Dolly!, performed a duet version of "She Got the Goldmine" with Parton, with an additional verse written for Parton from the ex-wife's perspective: the house, television and cars are all broken-down, the alimony checks bounce and the kids all look just like the ex-husband.
