= Stay Away, Joe (song) =

Song by Elvis Presley

from the album Let's Be Friends
- Released: 1968 (motion picture); April 1970 (on the album Let's Be Friends)
- Recorded: October 1, 1967
- Length: 1:37
- Songwriters: Ben Weisman (music); Sid Wayne (lyrics)

"Stay Away, Joe" is a song first recorded by Elvis Presley as part of the soundtrack for his 1968 motion picture Stay Away, Joe.

In 1970 it was released as the opening track of Presley's budget album Let's Be Friends.

== Writing ==
The song was written by Ben Weisman (music) and Sid Wayne (lyrics).

According to David Neal and his book Roots of Elvis, the writers of the song „seem to have been at the very least inspired by the old slave song, "Pick a Bale o'Cotton"“, a "folk-blues classic", originally recorded by Huddie Leadbetter (better known as Lead Belly) in 1935.

== Recording ==
Presley recorded it at the soundtrack recordings for the M.G.M movie Stay Away, Joe that took place on Sunday, October 1, 1967, at the RCA Studio B in Nashville, Tennessee.

== Critical reception ==
According to George Batista Da Silva's book Música e Ecran (in Portuguese), "Stay Awaya, Joe" "can be considered a minor song in Elvis Presley's vast repertoire".

== Track listings ==
7-inch EP (RCA Victor 20652, Australia, 1982)

1. "Stay Away, Joe"
2. "Goin' Home"
3. "All I Needed Was The Rain"
4. "Stay Away"

7-inch EP (RCA EX 2764, 2001) — released in 2001 as a bonus disc with the album Blue Hawaii - Collector's Edition

1. "Stay Away, Joe"
2. "Dominic"
3. "All I Needed Was The Rain"
4. "Goin' Home"
5. "Stay Away"
