= Kate (Johnny Cash song) =

Single by Johnny Cash

from the album A Thing Called Love
- B-side: "Miracle Man"
- Released: April 7, 1972
- Genre: Country; rockabilly
- Length: 2:19
- Label: Columbia
- Songwriter: Marty Robbins
- Producer: Larry Butler

Johnny Cash singles chronology
"A Thing Called Love" (1971)	"Kate" (1972)	"If I Had a Hammer" (1972)

"Kate" is a song written by Marty Robbins, and made popular by American country music artist Johnny Cash. It was released in March 1972 as the third single from his album A Thing Called Love. The song peaked at No. 2 on the Billboard Hot Country Singles chart. It also reached No. 1 on the RPM Country Tracks chart in Canada. The song was originally recorded by Rex Allen on a 1961 single with the title "You Put Me Here (Sure as Your Name's Kate)" issued on San Antonio–based Hacienda Records Catalog No. WW-007.

== Chart performance ==
Chart (1972)	Peak position
US Hot Country Songs (Billboard)	2
US Billboard Hot 100	75
Canadian RPM Country Tracks	1
Canadian RPM Top Singles	89
