= U.S. Male =

1967 song by Jerry Reed

"U.S. Male" is a country song written and first recorded by country musician Jerry Reed in 1966, which was included on his 1967 debut album The Unbelievable Guitar and Voice of Jerry Reed. Elvis Presley covered the song in 1968. Presley's cover remains better known and recognized than Reed's original.

== Elvis Presley cover ==
"U.S Male"

Single by Elvis Presley
- B-side: "Stay Away"
- Released: February 27, 1968
- Recorded: January 16, 1968
- Studio: RCA Studio B, Nashville
- Genre: Country
- Label: RCA Victor
- Songwriter: Jerry Reed Hubbard
- Producer: Felton Jarvis

Elvis Presley singles chronology
"Guitar Man" (1968)	"U.S Male" / "Stay Away" (1968)	"We Call on Him" / "You'll Never Walk Alone" (1968)

Jerry Reed recorded and released "U.S. Male" in late 1966 and Elvis Presley recorded his cover of the song in January 1968 for the B-movie Stay Away, Joe. It reached number 28 on the U.S. Billboard Hot 100 during the spring of 1968. In that same recording session, Presley also recorded a relatively unique jazzy blues-rock version of "Big Boss Man" by Jimmy Reed. Presley recorded these three songs accompanied by Reed on lead guitar. It paved the way for Presley's famous '68 Comeback Special, filmed in June 1968 and broadcast on NBC on December 3, 1968.

== Accolades ==
Dave Marsh included the song in his collection, The Heart of Rock & Soul: The 1001 Greatest Singles Ever Made as song #655.
