= Age (song) =

Song by Jim Croce

from the album I Got a Name
- Released: December 1973
- Recorded: 1973
- Studio: Hit Factory, New York City
- Genre: Folk rock
- Length: 3:44
- Label: ABC
- Songwriters: Jim Croce, Ingrid Croce
- Producers: Terry Cashman, Tommy West

"Age"

Single by Jerry Reed

from the album Jerry Reed Sings Jim Croce
- B-side: "Workin' at the Car Wash Blues"
- Released: March 1980
- Genre: Country
- Length: 3:51
- Label: RCA
- Songwriters: Jim Croce, Ingrid Croce

Jerry Reed singles chronology
"Sugar-Foot Rag" (1979)	"Age" (1980)	"The Family Friendly Inn" (1980)

"Age" is a song written and recorded by Jim Croce and his wife Ingrid. The song was first recorded in 1969 on their self-titled album. Jim Croce would record the song again, this time without Ingrid, for his final album I Got a Name in 1973. Jerry Reed's cover of the song was released as a single in 1980 on his tribute album to Croce, and it peaked at 36 on the Billboard country chart.

== Content ==
Age is about a change in the narrator's disposition after an experience over time where he went from having a lot of success to a little because of bad choices. The speaker regrets losing his ideals, which has caused him to be right back where he started from before his success. After losing everything he is working his way back to the top and is using his experience to better himself the second time around. The narrator will be careful climbing to success because “it hurts a lot to drop” but he comforts himself in case he does “drop” by musing “when your down nobody gives a damn anyway”

== Covers ==
- The Ventures covered Age on their tribute album "The Ventures Play the Jim Croce Songbook"
- Mike Auldridge recorded it in 1977 on his album Mike Auldridge & 'Old Dog'
- The Bluegrass Album Band with Tony Rice on lead vocals covered the song on their album Bluegrass Album, Vol. 4

== Chart performance ==
=== Jerry Reed ===
Chart (1980)	Peak position
U.S. Billboard Hot Country Singles	36
