= Another Puff =

Single by Jerry Reed

from the album Ko-Ko Joe
- B-side: "Love Man"
- Released: January 3, 1972
- Genre: Country
- Length: 4:05
- Label: RCA Victor
- Songwriters: Earl Jarrett; Jerry Reed
- Producer: Chet Atkins

Jerry Reed singles chronology
"Ko-Ko Joe" (1971)	"Another Puff" (1972)	"Smell the Flowers" (1972)

"Another Puff" is a talking blues anti-cigarette song co-written and recorded by American country music artist Jerry Reed. It was released in January 1972 as the second and final single from the album, Ko-Ko Joe. The song reached peaks of number 27 on the U.S. country chart and number 65 on the Billboard Hot 100.

== Composition and reception ==
"Another Puff" is a novelty song about a cigarette smoker who repeatedly resolves to quit, only to continue smoking. Rather than employing a conventional sung vocal, Reed delivers the lyrics primarily as a humorous, rhythmically spoken monologue in the style of talking blues. His performance is punctuated by coughing, laughter and increasingly rambling digressions as the narrator struggles with his addiction.

In a contemporary review, Record World described the recording as an anti-cigarette song in the talking blues style. Cash Box praised Reed's performance, describing his monologue as "brilliant both verbally and musically".

== Chart performance ==
Chart (1972)	Peak position
U.S. Billboard Hot Country Singles	27
U.S. Billboard Hot 100	65
Canadian RPM Country Tracks	19
Canadian RPM Top Singles	83
