= The Unbelievable Guitar and Voice of Jerry Reed =

Studio album by Jerry Reed
- Released: February 1967
- Recorded: July, September, October and November 1966
- Genre: Country
- Label: RCA Victor LSP-3756 (Stereo), LPM-3756 (Mono)
- Producer: Chet Atkins

Jerry Reed chronology
The Unbelievable Guitar and Voice of Jerry Reed (1967)	Nashville Underground (1968)

Singles from The Unbelievable Guitar and Voice of Jerry Reed
- 1. "Guitar Man" Released: March 5, 1967

Professional ratings
Review scores
Source	Rating
AllMusic	(no review) link

The Unbelievable Guitar and Voice of Jerry Reed is a studio album by country music singer and guitarist Jerry Reed, released in 1967. It was the first of 33 albums Reed would record for RCA Victor.

The album is notable for introducing two songs, "Guitar Man" and "U.S. Male", that would soon after be covered by Elvis Presley, with Reed participating in the recording sessions.

== Reissues ==
- In 2012, The Unbelievable Guitar and Voice of Jerry Reed and Nashville Underground were reissued on CD by Real Gone Music.

== Track listing ==
All tracks composed by Jerry Reed Hubbard

=== Side One ===
1. "It Don't Work That Way" – 2:15
2. "Guitar Man" – 2:25
3. "You're Young" – 2:45
4. "Woman Shy" – 2:13
5. "I Feel For You" – 2:56
6. "Take A Walk" – 2:31

=== Side Two ===
1. "Love Man" – 2:23
2. "If I Promise" – 2:29
3. "U.S. Male" – 2:25
4. "Long Gone" – 2:26
5. "If It Comes To That" – 2:18
6. "The Claw" - 1:56

== Personnel ==
- Jerry Reed - vocals, lead guitar
- Wayne Moss - guitar
- Fred Carter - guitar
- Junior Huskey - bass
- Jerry Carrigan - drums
- Jerry Smith - harpsichord
- Ray Stevens - harpsichord

== Production notes ==
- Produced by Chet Atkins
- Recording Engineers - Jim Malloy and William Vandervort
- Recorded in RCA Victor's Nashville Sound Studio, Nashville, Tennessee
- Liner notes by Merle Atkins
