= The Bird (Jerry Reed song) =

Single by Jerry Reed

from the album The Bird
- Released: October 4, 1982
- Recorded: 1982
- Genre: Country, novelty song
- Length: 3:16
- Label: RCA
- Songwriters: Hal Coleman and Barry Etris (main portion of song): Johnny Bush and Paul Stroud ("Whiskey River"); Bobby Braddock and Curly Putman ("He Stopped Loving Her Today"); Willie Nelson ("On the Road Again")
- Producer: Rick Hall

Jerry Reed singles chronology
"She Got the Goldmine (I Got the Shaft)" (1982)	"The Bird" (1982)	"Down on the Corner" (1983)

"The Bird" is a song recorded by American country music singer Jerry Reed. Written by Hal Coleman and Barry Etris, this novelty song contains impressions of Willie Nelson's "Whiskey River" and "On the Road Again;" and George Jones' "He Stopped Loving Her Today." It was released in October 1982 as the lead single from the album, The Bird. The song peaked at No. 2 on the Billboard magazine Hot Country Singles chart just before Christmas.

== Content ==
The song is told in first person from the point of view of a blue-collar worker who stops at a roadside tavern. While there, a gentleman walks in the door with a curious-looking bird on his shoulder. The man, who turns out to be a smooth-talking salesman, walks up to the main character and boasts about the bird's singing abilities. The protagonist is skeptical and asks the salesman to back up his claim. The salesman tells the bird, "Do Ol' Willie." To the protagonist's disbelief, the bird immediately sings the chorus to Nelson's "Whiskey River."

Sensing a possibly huge windfall with this novelty act (for instance, creating a show with a singing bird as his main act), the main character asks the salesman to have the bird perform one more song. The bird sings the chorus of Jones' "He Stopped Loving Her Today."

Immediately thereafter, the protagonist agrees to buy the bird for $500. The deal is closed, and the salesman exits. Moments later, as the protagonist is dreaming about a lucrative career as novelty act performer, the bird flies out the door, never to be seen again. The protagonist realizes that he has been tricked and can only watch helplessly as the bird flies out into the night, singing modified lyrics to Nelson's "On the Road Again." (The modified lyric is: "The life I love is making money with my friend" (compare to the Nelson original: "The life I love is making music with my friends")).

As the verse to "On the Road Again" repeats to the fade, Reed can be heard screaming for the bird to come back; one of the final things he says before the fade ends is "Buy me a drink, somebody!"

== Chart performance ==
Chart (1982–1983)	Peak position
US Hot Country Songs (Billboard)	2
Canadian RPM Country Tracks	1
