= Guitar Man (song) =

1967 single by Jerry Reed

Single by Jerry Reed

from the album The Unbelievable Guitar and Voice of Jerry Reed
- B-side: "It Don't Work That Way"
- Released: 1967
- Recorded: 1967
- Genre: Country
- Length: 2:25
- Label: RCA Victor
- Songwriter: Jerry Reed
- Producer: Chet Atkins

Jerry Reed singles chronology
"If I Don't Live Up to It" (1965)	"Guitar Man" (1967)	"Tupelo Mississippi Flash" (1967)

"Guitar Man" is a 1967 country song written and recorded by Jerry Reed, who took it to No. 53 on the Billboard country music charts in 1967. Elvis Presley soon covered the song, singing over Reed's guitar; the collaboration reached No. 1 on the Billboard "Hot country singles" charts.

== Original recording ==
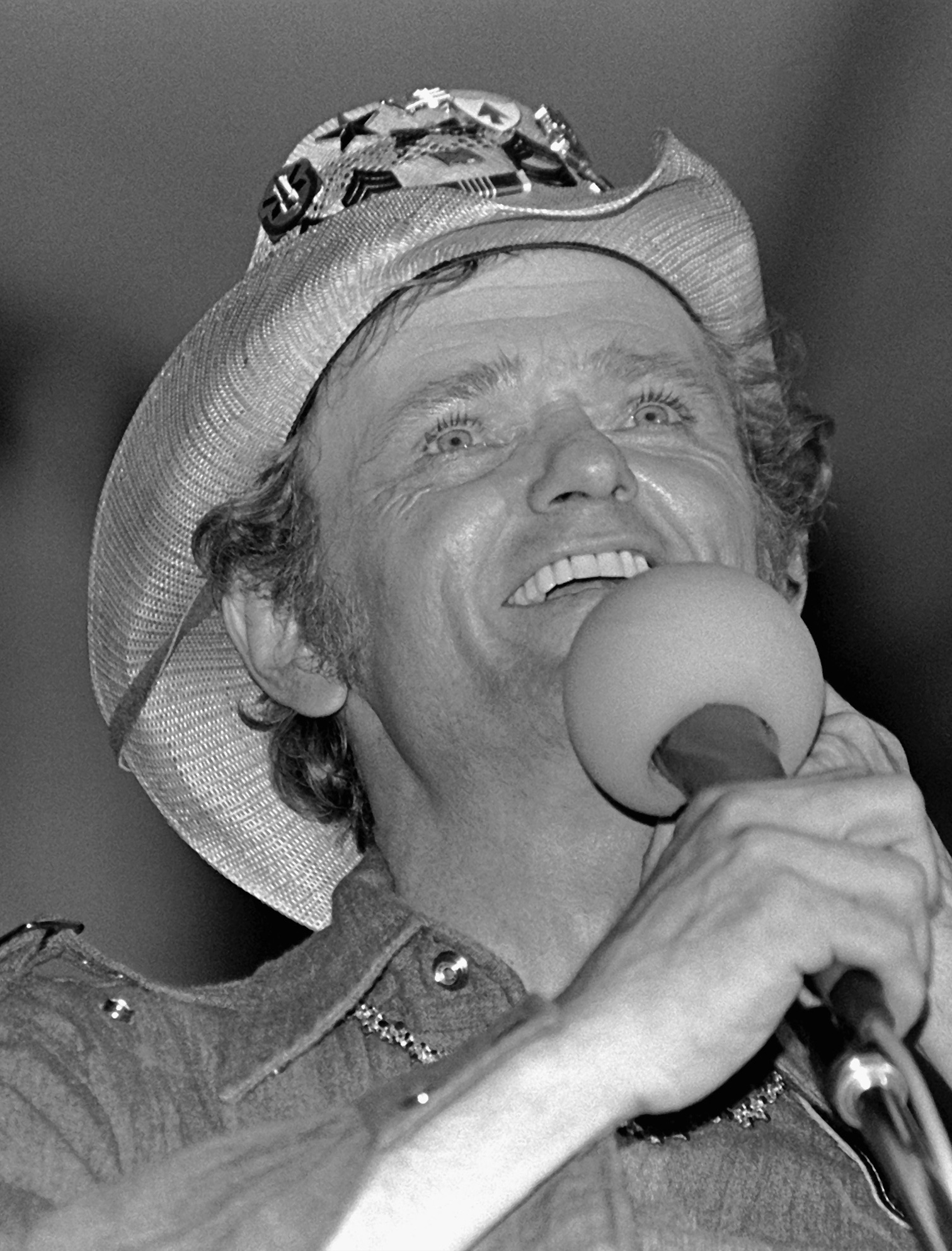
Jerry Reed, who wrote and originally recorded "Guitar Man"

"Guitar Man" was written and first recorded by Jerry Reed in 1967. It was released as a single on RCA Victor and later appeared on the album The Unbelievable Guitar and Voice of Jerry Reed.

The song reached No. 53 on the Billboard Hot Country Singles chart. Although only a modest chart success, it attracted attention for its guitar work and vocal delivery.

Guitar Man gained wider recognition when Elvis Presley covered it the same year, with Reed providing guitar.

== Elvis Presley covers ==
"Guitar Man"

Single by Elvis Presley

from the album Clambake
- B-side: "High Heel Sneakers"
- Released: January 3, 1968
- Recorded: September 10, 1967
- Studio: RCA Studio B, Nashville
- Genre: Country
- Label: RCA Victor
- Songwriter: Jerry Reed
- Producer: Felton Jarvis

Elvis Presley singles chronology
"Big Boss Man" b/w "You Don't Know Me" (1967)	"Guitar Man" (1968)	"U.S. Male" b/w "Stay Away" (1968)

According to Peter Guralnick's two-volume biography of Presley, the singer had been trying to record the tune, but missed the sound Jerry Reed had brought to the original release. As recounted in The Commercial Appeal, Presley reportedly asked for "that redneck picker who's on the original tune". RCA managed to locate Reed and brought him to the session at RCA's Studio B in Nashville. The twelfth take eventually became the 1968 single master, after Reed overdubbed some additional guitar and the length was edited to omit Elvis ad-libbing Ray Charles' "What'd I Say" (which he had previously covered in 1963 for Viva Las Vegas) towards the end of that take.

Presley opened his 1968 comeback special a medley of Jerry Leiber and Mike Stoller's "Trouble" and this number. With dark, moody lighting highlighting his presence, the sequence alluded to Presley's original "dangerous" image, and served to prove that the singer was still "sexy, surly and downright provocative".

Under the supervision of Presley's producer Felton Jarvis, the song was (partially) re-recorded in 1980 with a new backing track that again included Jerry Reed playing his unique guitar licks, and spent one week at number one on the country chart the following year.

=== Personnel ===
1967 recording

- Elvis Presley – lead vocals
- Jerry Reed – lead guitar
- Scotty Moore – rhythm guitar
- Chip Young – rhythm guitar
- Harold Bradley – rhythm guitar
- Bob Moore – bass
- Floyd Cramer – piano
- D. J. Fontana – drums
- Buddy Harman – drums

1980 re-recording

- Elvis Presley – lead vocals
- Jerry Reed – lead guitar
- Jerry Shook – rhythm guitar
- Larry Byrom – rhythm guitar
- Mike Leech – bass
- David Briggs – piano
- Jerry Carrigan – drums

== Chart performance ==
=== Jerry Reed ===
Chart (1967)	Peak position
U.S. Billboard Hot Country Singles	53

=== Elvis Presley ===
Chart (1967)	Peak position
Canada	36
U.S. Billboard Hot 100	43
U.S. Cash Box Top 100	42

Chart (1981)	Peak position
U.S. Billboard Hot 100	28
U.S. Billboard Hot Country Singles	1
U.S. Billboard Adult Contemporary	16
Canadian RPM Country Tracks	1
