= Jerry Reed Sings Jim Croce =

Studio album by Jerry Reed
- Released: April 1980
- Genre: Country
- Length: 29:41
- Label: RCA Victor

Jerry Reed chronology
Live! Featuring Hot Stuff (1979)	Jerry Reed Sings Jim Croce (1980)	Dixie Dreams (1981)

Singles from Jerry Reed Sings Jim Croce
- 1. "Age" Released: March 1980

Jerry Reed Sings Jim Croce is an album by American country singer Jerry Reed, released by RCA Records in 1980. The album is a tribute album for Jim Croce who died in 1973 in a plane crash during the peak of his career. Seven of the ten songs were singles released by Croce. The album peaked at number 56 on the Billboard country chart. The song "Age" (b/w "Workin' at the Car Wash Blues") was the only single released from the album. It peaked at 36 on the Billboard Hot Country Songs chart.

== Critical reception ==
Professional ratings
Review scores
Source	Rating
Allmusic	link

Billboard reviewer named this work as "fine tribute package". He wrote: "Reed's ebullient vocal style gives a fresh treatment to Croce's originals, many of which are fast-paced humorous numbers like "You Don't Mess Around with Jim" and "Bad, Bad Leroy Brown." Yet when the need arises for quieter vocals carrying more depth and feeling, Reed adapts his style to fit the mood, as evidenced on ballads such as "Time in a Bottle" and "Age." Reed adds his inimitable guitar touches throughout".

== Track listing ==
All tracks are written by Jim Croce, except "Age" which was co-written with Ingrid Croce and "I Got a Name", written by Charles Fox and Norman Gimbel.

No.	Title	Length
1.	"Workin' at the Car Wash Blues"	2:17
2.	"One Less Set of Footsteps"	2:43
3.	"You Don't Mess Around with Jim"	3:08
4.	"I Got a Name"	3:20
5.	"Time in a Bottle"	2:54
6.	"Age"	3:47
7.	"I'll Have to Say I Love You in a Song"	3:00
8.	"The Hard Way Every Time"	2:25
9.	"Bad, Bad Leroy Brown"	3:04
10.	"Careful Man"	3:04

== Chart performance ==
Chart (1980)	Peak position
U.S. Billboard Top Country Albums	56

== Personnel ==
- Jerry Reed – guitar, vocals
- Kenny Penny – guitar
- Stan Dacus – engineer
- Wayne 'The Professor' Harrison – keyboards
- Paul Cooke – drums
