= Amos Moses =

Single by Jerry Reed

from the album Georgia Sunshine
- B-side: "The Preacher and the Bear"
- Released: October 19, 1970
- Genre: Swamp rock; country
- Length: 2:19
- Label: RCA Victor
- Songwriter: Jerry Reed
- Producer: Chet Atkins

Jerry Reed singles chronology
"The Preacher and the Bear" (1970)	"Amos Moses" (1970)	"When You're Hot, You're Hot" (1971)

Alternative cover
- German album artwork of the 7" release of Amos Moses

"Amos Moses" is a song written and recorded by American country music singer Jerry Reed. It was released in October 1970 as the fourth and final single from the album Georgia Sunshine and was his highest-charting single on the Billboard Hot 100, bowing in at No. 97 on October 31, 1970, and peaking at No. 8 on February 27 and March 6, 1971. It has been used ever since as a line dance taught at YMCAs. "Amos Moses" was certified gold for sales of 1 million units by the RIAA. It was No.28 on Billboard's Year-End Hot 100 singles of 1971 and also appeared on several other countries' charts.

== Content ==
The song tells the story of a one-armed Cajun alligator poacher named Amos Moses, son of "Doc Milsap" and his wife Hannah, who lived "about 45 minutes southeast of Thibodaux, Louisiana." The song tells the story of Amos's life, his upbringing, and his troubles with the law for illegally hunting alligators, including how a sheriff "snuck in the swamp [to] get the boy, but he never come out again." suggesting the sheriff got lost in the bayou but the song leaves the actual fate of the sheriff ambiguous.

== Appearances in other media ==
The song appears in the action-adventure game Grand Theft Auto: San Andreas (2004) on country radio station K-Rose.

The song was featured in an episode of the TV show My Name Is Earl.

It was covered by Les Claypool twice: on Primus's Rhinoplasty EP and on his 2014 Duo de Twang album. It's also been covered by Alabama 3 on their sixth studio album M.O.R. (2007) and by the Pleasure Barons on their 1993 album Live in Las Vegas, with Mojo Nixon on lead vocals. Cross Canadian Ragweed covered the song on 1999's Live and Loud at the Wormy Dog Saloon.

A version of "Amos Moses" featured on the Sensational Alex Harvey Band's sixth studio album SAHB Stories (1976).

The character Amos Moses features as the trapper in Walter Hill's film Southern Comfort (1981) played by Brion James.

== Chart performance ==
=== Weekly charts ===
Chart (1970–1971)	Peak position
Australia (Kent Music Report)	34
Canadian RPM Top Singles	2
U.S. Billboard Hot 100	8
U.S. Billboard Hot Country Songs	16
Australia (Go-Set)	38

=== Year-end charts ===
Chart (1971)	Rank
Canadian RPM Top Singles	35
U.S. Cashbox Top 100	64
U.S. Billboard Hot 100	28
