= Lord, Mr. Ford =

Single by Jerry Reed

from the album Lord, Mr. Ford
- B-side: "Two-Timin'"
- Released: May 14, 1973
- Recorded: January 9, 1973; Nashville, Tennessee
- Genre: Country
- Length: 3:17
- Label: RCA
- Songwriter: Deena Kaye Rose
- Producers: Chet Atkins and Jerry Reed

Jerry Reed singles chronology
| "You Took All the Ramblin' Out of Me" (1972) | "Lord, Mr. Ford" (1973) | "The Uptown Poker Club" (1973) |

"Lord, Mr. Ford" is a song written by Deena Kaye Rose (Note: Credited as Dick Feller; the song was written and released before Rose came out as transgender.) and recorded by Jerry Reed. It was released in May 1973 as the only single from the album of the same name, Lord, Mr. Ford. The single was Jerry Reed's second of three No. 1's on the Billboard Hot Country Singles chart. "Lord, Mr. Ford" spent one week at the top and a total of 13 weeks inside the chart's top 40.

== Song background ==
"Lord, Mr. Ford" is a satire on the social, cultural and economic influence that the automobile has had on the American public. The lyrics bemoan the fact that a seemingly simple invention to assist mankind has instead brought nothing but grief, become increasingly more complex and added to the increasing fast-paced demands of society. The refrain asks the question aloud to the late Henry Ford: "Lord, Mr. Ford, I just wish that you could see/ What your simple horseless carriage has become."

In an Allmusic review for the album bearing "Lord, Mr. Ford," Pemberton Roach terms the song "a semi-political song," with Reed's version an "appropriately crotchety considering the song's 'simple working man' theme.

Referring to a substitution in the lyrics concerning the average American owning 1½ cars, ("Now the average American father and mother/Own one whole car and half another/And I bet that half a car is a trick to drive, don't you"), Roach alludes to the original lyrics using the word "bitch," instead of the word "trick" as in the final recorded version. Noted Roach: "(I)t's amusing to hear notorious bad boy Reed forced to substitute the word "trick" for the original version's 'bitch'."."

== Chart performance ==
| Chart (1973) | Peak position |
|---|---|
| Australia (Kent Music Report) | 97 |
| U.S. Billboard Hot Country Singles | 1 |
| Canadian RPM Country Tracks | 2 |
| Canadian RPM Adult Contemporary Tracks | 25 |
| U.S. Billboard Hot 100 | 68 |
| U.S. Billboard Easy Listening | 32 |
