= Nashville Underground =

Studio album by Jerry Reed
- Released: 1968
- Recorded: 1968
- Genre: Country-pop
- Length: 27:42
- Label: RCA
- Producer: Chet Atkins

Jerry Reed chronology
The Unbelievable Guitar and Voice of Jerry Reed (1967)	Nashville Underground (1968)	Alabama Wild Man (1968)

Nashville Underground is the second studio album by Jerry Reed, also the second Reed recorded for RCA.

== Critical reception ==
Professional ratings
Review scores
Source	Rating
AllMusic	4.5/5 stars

Stephen Thomas Erlewine of AllMusic described the album as "highly polished, exquisitely produced country-pop" and "a thoroughly engaging piece of period pop". The album's review in Billboard praised the hit single "Tupelo Mississippi Flash" and commented favorably on the tracks "Wabash Cannonball", "Hallelujah I Love Her So", "John Henry", and "Remembering".

== Influence ==
Guitarist Brent Mason has cited listening to his father's copy of Nashville Underground as his first exposure to the 'wonders of the guitar'. Reed, and this album in particular, have been credited at the 'underground' Nashville music scene aimed at college students as opposed to the traditional country audience.

== Track listing ==
All tracks are written by Jerry Reed, except where noted.

1. "Remembering" – 2:52
2. "A Thing Called Love" – 2:23
3. "You Wouldn't Know A Good Thing" – 2:48
4. "Save Your Dreams" – 1:58
5. "Almost Crazy" – 2:44
6. "You've Been Crying Again" – 2:10
7. "Fine On My Mind" – 2:42
8. "Tupelo Mississippi Flash" – 2:48
9. "Wabash Cannonball" – 2:33
10. "Hallelujah I Love Her So" (Ray Charles) – 2:53
11. "John Henry" – 2:22

== Charts ==
Chart (1968)	Peak position
US Top Country Albums (Billboard)	31
