= Stay Away, Joe =

1968 film by Peter Tewksbury

- Theatrical release poster by Robert McGinnis
- Directed by: Peter Tewksbury
- Screenplay by: Michael A. Hoey; Burt Kennedy (uncredited)
- Based on: Stay Away, Joe; 1953 novel by Dan Cushman
- Produced by: Douglas Laurence
- Starring: Elvis Presley; Burgess Meredith; Joan Blondell; Katy Jurado; Thomas Gomez
- Cinematography: Fred J. Koenekamp
- Edited by: George W. Brooks
- Music by: Jack Marshall
- Color process: Metrocolor
- Production company: Metro-Goldwyn-Mayer
- Distributed by: Metro-Goldwyn-Mayer
- Release date: March 8, 1968 (US)
- Running time: 102 minutes
- Country: United States
- Language: English
- Box office: $1,500,000 (US/ Canada)

Stay Away, Joe is a 1968 American comedy Western film with musical interludes, set in modern times and starring Elvis Presley, Burgess Meredith, Joan Blondell, Katy Jurado and Thomas Gomez. Directed by Peter Tewksbury, the film is based on the 1953 satirical farce novel of the same name by Dan Cushman. The film reached number 65 on the Variety weekly national box office chart in 1968.

== Plot ==
Native American rodeo rider Joe Lightcloud is a Navajo whose family still lives on the reservation. He returns to the reservation in a white Cadillac convertible that he uses to drive cattle.

Joe persuades his congressman to give him 20 heifers and a prize bull so that he and his father can prove that the Navajos can successfully raise cattle on the reservation. If their experiment is successful, the government will help all the Navajo people. But Joe's friend Bronc Hoverty accidentally barbecues the prize bull, while Joe sells the heifers to buy home improvements for his stepmother Annie Lightcloud.

Joe is able to borrow a bull named Dominick, but the bull is old and shows no interest in the heifers. Mamie Callahan, the daughter of shotgun-toting tavern owner Glenda Callahan, can't seem to stay away from the girl-chasing Joe. Joe trades in his horse at a used car dealership for a red convertible automobile from which he sells off the parts to obtain cash from a salvage yard. After almost all of the usable car parts are sold, Joe rides around on a beat-up motorcycle.

Joe's younger sister Mary, a bank teller in town, has a chance to marry into the reasonably wealthy Hawkins family. When the prospective mother-in-law visits the Lightcloud's rundown shack, things go well until Glenda Callahan chases Joe through the house firing her shotgun. Mrs. Hawkins promptly faints. The couple eventually reconciles.

To raise money, Joe organizes a contest in which riders have to ride Dominick the bull. Joe has to ride Dominick and hang on in order to win the prize money, which he does. At his father's house, Joe and his friends are involved in a large fight that destroys the house that they have been building.

== Cast ==
- Elvis Presley as Joe Lightcloud
- Burgess Meredith as Charlie Lightcloud
- Joan Blondell as Glenda Callahan
- Katy Jurado as Annie Lightcloud
- Thomas Gomez as Grandpa
- Henry Jones as Hy Slager
- L.Q. Jones as Bronc Hoverty
- Quentin Dean as Mamie Callahan
- Douglas Henderson as Congressman Morrissey
- Dick Wilson as Car Salesman
- Sonny West as Jackson He-Crow
- Joe Esposito (uncredited)
- Charlie Hodge (uncredited)
- Susan Trustman as Mary Lightcloud
- Angus Duncan as Lorne Hawkins
- Anne Seymour as Lorne's Mother, Mrs. Hawkins

== Production ==
Burt Kennedy was originally announced as director.

Presley was paid $850,000 plus 40% of the profits.

The screenplay was adapted from the failed Broadway musical Whoop-Up and retained many of the same plot devices and characters, including Joe's grandfather who refuses to live in a house, preferring his ancestral teepee.

== Soundtrack ==
For the first time since Wild in the Country, neither an LP record nor an extended-play single was planned for a Presley film soundtrack. Three songs were written for the film by the team of Sid Wayne and Ben Weisman, who had already contributed close to 50 songs for various Presley movies in the decade.

Although released before Speedway, this film and its soundtrack were made after the first of Presley's last five films in the 1960s in which musical numbers were kept to a minimum. The recording session took place at RCA Studio B in Nashville on October 1, 1967. At the end of the session, Presley made his record producer Felton Jarvis promise to never release "Dominick," the song written for him to sing to the bull. However, the song is actually sung to two women in the movie without the bull present. "Dominick" would eventually make its first official CD appearance on the Kissin Cousins/Clambake/Stay Away, Joe soundtrack compilation in 1994 (long after the deaths of Presley and Jarvis); it had previously been released, unauthorized, as "Dominick the Impotent Bull" on the 1982 bootleg compilation Elvis' Greatest Shit. The other two songs, "Stay Away, Joe" and "All I Needed Was the Rain," were not even featured on a promotional single for the film premiere, but instead respectively appeared on the budget albums Let's Be Friends in 1970 and Elvis Sings Flaming Star in 1969.

Two additional songs related to the film were recorded at sessions on January 10 and 11, 1968 at the same studio. "Goin' Home" by Joy Byers would not be used, surfacing on the soundtrack to the next Presley film, Speedway, while a different song entitled "Stay Away," rewritten from the tune of "Greensleeves" by Sid Tepper and Roy C. Bennett, would appear as the B-side to the #28 hit single "U.S. Male." Released as catalog item 47-9465b on February 28, 1968, the B-side "Stay Away" would peak at #68 on the Billboard Hot 100 independently of "U.S. Male." The producer in charge of the recordings for MGM was Jeff Alexander.

=== Personnel ===
- Elvis Presley – vocals
- The Jordanaires – backing vocals
- Pete Drake – pedal steel guitar
- Scotty Moore, Chip Young – electric guitar
- Charlie Hodge – acoustic guitar
- Charlie McCoy – organ, harmonica
- Hoyt Hawkins – organ
- Floyd Cramer – piano
- Bob Moore – double bass
- D.J. Fontana, Buddy Harman – drums

=== Film music track listing ===
1. "Stay Away" (Sid Tepper and Roy C. Bennett) (melody taken from "Greensleeves)"- heard over opening credits
2. "Stay Away, Joe" (Sid Wayne and Ben Weisman)
3. "All I Needed Was the Rain" (Sid Wayne and Ben Weisman)
4. "Dominick" (Sid Wayne and Ben Weisman)

== Reception ==
Kevin Thomas of the Los Angeles Times wrote that the film "... could scarcely seem more embarrassingly tasteless or ill-timed than right now. In an unintentionally patronizing way it projects an image of the Indian as happy-go-lucky, immoral and irresponsible just when the public is becoming aware of how truly tragic his plight is. No amount of good-naturedness—and 'Stay Away, Joe!' undeniably has plenty of that—can compensate for humor based on stereotypes so offensive to minority-group sensitivities." However, Thomas suggested that if it had been made in a different time, "... it would seem a pretty good picture. It has plenty of bounce, a strong cast ... some spunky songs and good color photography of natural locales."

A review in Variety reported "generally flat comedy" with "many forced slapstick situations", and echoed Thomas's review by stating that the story was "... out of touch with latterday appreciation of some basic dignity in all human beings ... At best, film is a dim artistic accomplishment; at worst, it caters to outdated prejudice. Custer himself might be embarrassed — for the Indians."

The Monthly Film Bulletin reported: "Meandering Elvis Presley comedy, rather short on invention except for an amiably hectic finale ... The musical offerings are if anything even less memorable than usual."
