= Alabama Wild Man (song) =

1972 Single by - Jerry Reed

Single by Jerry Reed

from the album Jerry Reed
- B-side: "Take It Easy"
- Released: July 3, 1972
- Genre: Country
- Length: 2:33
- Label: RCA Victor
- Songwriter: Jerry Reed
- Producers: Chet Atkins; Jerry Reed

Jerry Reed singles chronology
"Smell the Flowers" (1972)	"Alabama Wild Man" (1972)	"You Took All the Ramblin' Out of Me" (1972)

Alabama Wild Man is a song written and recorded by American country artist Jerry Reed. Originally released as a single in 1966, it was the title track to his 1968 album Alabama Wild Man. It was re-recorded and released in July 1972 as the only single from the album Jerry Reed. The song reached peaks of number 22 on the U.S. country chart and number 12 on the Canadian RPM Country Tracks chart. The B-side, "Take It Easy (In Your Mind)," would later be sampled in the 1972 top ten hit "Convention '72" by The Delegates.

== Chart performance ==
Chart (1972)	Peak position
U.S. Billboard Hot Country Singles	22
U.S. Billboard Hot 100	62
Canadian RPM Country Tracks	12
Canadian RPM Top Singles	79
