= Ko-Ko Joe =

Single by Jerry Reed

from the album Ko-Ko Joe
- B-side: "I Feel For You"
- Released: August 23, 1971
- Genre: Country
- Length: 2:30
- Label: RCA Victor
- Songwriter: Jerry Reed
- Producer: Chet Atkins

Jerry Reed singles chronology
| "When You're Hot, You're Hot" (1971) | "Ko-Ko Joe" (1971) | "Another Puff" (1972) |

Ko-Ko Joe is a song written and recorded by American country artist Jerry Reed. It was released in August 1971 as the lead single from the album of the same name, Ko-Ko Joe. The song reached peaks of number 11 on the U.S. country chart and number 51 on the Billboard Hot 100 and was the follow-up to his country chart number 1 hit, When You're Hot, You're Hot.

== Content ==
The song, composed by Reed himself, begins with the description of a man living on the banks of the Etowah River, (as Reed calls it "cottonmouth country"). As the locals seem to tell it, he's a long-haired, dirty-clothed survivalist who drinks homemade brew and eats exotic meats. He is ostracized by these same locals who think of him as both a bum and 'crazy'. Reminiscent of the 'maligned' character's 'redemption' found in Hank Williams' 1953 song, "Be Careful of Stones That You Throw" (in that case a woman), the third verse tells us about the day (one year before the song's telling), when the dam on the river burst, washing away everything in its path. We learn from the headlines of that day about a mother who told of how Ko-Ko pulled her son from the flood waters, saving the boy's life. Reed leaves it ambiguous as to whether Ko-Ko survived.

== Chart performance ==
| Chart (1971) | Peak position |
|---|---|
| U.S. Billboard Hot Country Singles | 11 |
| U.S. Billboard Hot 100 | 51 |
| Canadian RPM Country Tracks | 3 |
| Canadian RPM Top Singles | 33 |
| Canadian RPM Adult Contemporary Tracks | 26 |
