= A Thing Called Love =

Studio album by Johnny Cash
- Released: April 3, 1972
- Recorded: 1972
- Length: 28:37
- Label: Columbia
- Producer: Larry Butler

Johnny Cash chronology
Sunday Morning Coming Down (1972)	A Thing Called Love (1972)	America: A 200-Year Salute in Story and Song (1972)

Singles from A Thing Called Love
- 1. "Papa Was a Good Man" Released: September 9, 1971; 2. "A Thing Called Love" Released: December 30, 1971; 3. "Kate" Released: April 7, 1972

Professional ratings
Review scores
Source	Rating
Allmusic	link

A Thing Called Love is the 39th overall album by country singer Johnny Cash, released on Columbia Records in 1972 (see 1972 in music). The title song, written by Jerry Reed, was released successfully as a single (with "Daddy" as the B-side), reaching No. 2 on the country charts; two more singles charted as well, while the album itself also reached No. 2 on the country album charts. "A Thing Called Love" was re-recorded by Cash for Classic Cash: Hall of Fame Series (1988), while "Tear Stained Letter" was reprised on American IV: The Man Comes Around (2002). The Canadian pressing of this album has a different version of "Kate" with altered lyrics.

== Track listing ==
No.	Title	Writer(s)	Length
1.	"Kate"	Marty Robbins	2:22
2.	"Melva's Wine"	Vincent Matthews	2:55
3.	"A Thing Called Love"	Jerry R. Hubbard	2:36
4.	"I Promise You"	Johnny Cash	2:58
5.	"Papa Was a Good Man"	Hal Bynum	2:38
6.	"Tear Stained Letter"	Johnny Cash	2:45
7.	"Mississippi Sand"	Johnny Cash, June Carter Cash	3:08
8.	"Daddy"	Don Reid, Harold Reid	2:54
9.	"Arkansas Lovin' Man"	Red Lane	2:51
10.	"The Miracle Man"	Johnny Cash, Larry Lee	3:30

== Personnel ==
- Johnny Cash – vocals, guitar
- The Evangel Temple Choir – backing vocals
- The Carter Family – backing vocals
- Marshall Grant – bass guitar
- W.S. Holland – drums
- Bob Wootton, Carl Perkins, Ray Edenton, Jerry Reed – guitar
- Tommy Allsup – acoustic guitar
- Charlie McCoy – harmonica
- Bill Pursell – piano
- Larry Butler – producer, piano, arrangements on "A Thing Called Love" and "Papa Was a Good Man"
- Don Tweedy – arrangement on "Tear Stained Letter"

Technical

- Don Tweedy – producer on "Tear Stained Letter"
- Charlie Bragg, Lou Bradley – engineers
- Bill Barnes – cover
- Al Clayton – front and back cover photography
- Don Wolf – cover photography

== Charts ==
=== Weekly charts ===
Chart (1972)	Peak position
US Billboard 200	112
US Top Country Albums (Billboard)	2

=== Year-end charts ===
Chart (1972)	Position
US Top Country Albums (Billboard)	14

=== Singles ===
Year	Single	Chart	Position
1971	"Papa Was a Good Man"	Country Singles	16
1971	"A Thing Called Love"	Country Singles	2
1972	"Kate"	Country Singles	2
1972	"Kate"	Pop Singles	75

== Covers ==
The title song was covered by Elvis Presley on his 1972 album He Touched Me.
