= Alabama Wild Man (album) =

Studio album by Jerry Reed
- Released: 1968
- Recorded: 1968
- Label: RCA
- Producer: Chet Atkins

Jerry Reed chronology
Nashville Underground (1967)	Alabama Wild Man (1968)	Better Things in Life (1969)

Alabama Wild Man is the third studio album by Jerry Reed. It was recorded for RCA.

== Critical reception ==
Professional ratings
Review scores
Source	Rating
AllMusic	4/5 stars

Al Campbell of AllMusic stated that Reed "blurred the line between country and pop music", but "that didn't mean he was creating one-dimensional music".

== Track listing ==
All songs are written by Jerry Reed, except where noted.

1. "Alabama Wild Man" – 2:44
2. "Love Prints" – 2:28
3. "Broken Heart Attack" – 2:08
4. "Free Born Man" (Keith Allison, Mark Lindsay) – 2:35
5. "Last Train to Clarksville" (Tommy Boyce, Bobby Hart) – 2:14
6. "Twelve Bar Midnight" – 2:24
7. "Losing Your Love" – 2:45
8. "Today Is Mine" – 3:46
9. "Maybe In Time" – 2:25
10. "House of the Rising Sun" (Traditional) – 2:42
11. "You'd Better Take Time" – 2:25

== Charts ==
Chart (1968)	Peak position
US Top Country Albums (Billboard)	31
