= A Thing Called Love (song) =

1972 single by Jerry Reed

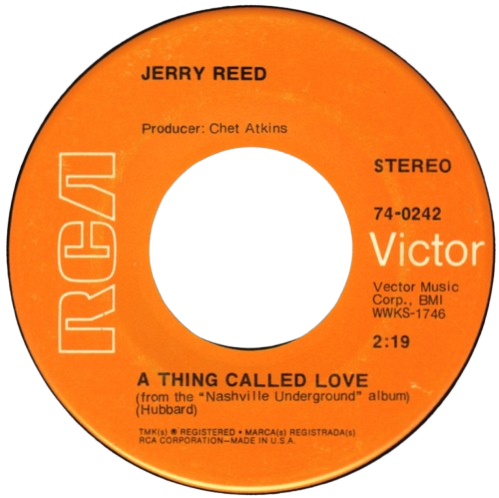

Single by Jerry Reed

from the album Nashville Underground
- B-side: "Hallelujah I Love Her So"
- Released: September 1969
- Recorded: November 29, 1967
- Studio: RCA Victor Studio, Nashville, Tennessee
- Genre: Country
- Length: 2:20
- Label: RCA Victor
- Songwriter: Jerry Reed
- Producer: Chet Atkins

Jerry Reed singles chronology
"Are You from Dixie ('Cause I'm from Dixie Too)" (1969)	"A Thing Called Love" (1969)	"Talk About the Good Times" (1970)

"A Thing Called Love"

Single by Jimmy Dean

from the album A Thing Called Love
- B-side: "One Last Time"
- Released: February 1968
- Recorded: December 5, 1967
- Studio: RCA Victor Studio, Nashville, Tennessee
- Genre: Country
- Length: 2:15
- Label: RCA Victor
- Songwriter: Jerry Reed
- Producers: Chet Atkins, Felton Jarvis

"A Thing Called Love"

Single by Johnny Cash

from the album A Thing Called Love
- B-side: "Daddy"
- Released: December 30, 1971
- Genre: Country
- Length: 2:36
- Label: Columbia
- Songwriter: Jerry Reed
- Producer: Larry Butler

Johnny Cash singles chronology
"Papa Was a Good Man" (1971)	"A Thing Called Love" (1971)	"Kate" (1972)

"A Thing Called Love"

Song by Elvis Presley

from the album He Touched Me
- Released: April 1972
- Recorded: May 1971
- Studio: RCA Studio B, Nashville, Tennessee
- Genre: Gospel
- Length: 2:27
- Label: RCA
- Songwriter: Jerry Reed
- Producer: Felton Jarvis

"A Thing Called Love" is a song written and originally recorded by Jerry Reed in 1967 and was first included on his album Nashville Underground. This song has been recorded by many artists, including Jimmy Dean, Ed Ames, Elvis Presley, Lynn Anderson, and Glen Campbell. In 1971, the song was recorded by Johnny Cash and it became a No. 1 country hit in Canada. The record was Cash's biggest hit in Europe, charting in Ireland, the United Kingdom, and the Netherlands. Presley's version features The Imperials on backing vocals and is an uncredited duet with their bass singer Armond Morales; it was also recorded in 1971 and was released on his third and final gospel album, He Touched Me in 1972.

== Ed Ames version ==
Ed Ames' version of "A Thing Called Love" was first recorded for his album Love of the Common People. It was then released as a single in November 1969, with critics saying that "Lyrics that give a special viewpoint to the 'power of love' theme add their own special magnetism to this change-of-pace side from Ed Ames." "A Thing Called Love" entered the Billboard Easy Listening chart in the issue dated December 20, 1969, reaching number 21 during a six-week run on it. The single reach No. 19 on the Record World Top-Non Rock chart in January 1970. It was ranked similarly on RPM magazine's Adult Contemporary survey in Canada, climbing to No. 22. On the US pop-oriented charts, the single only managed to reach the Cashbox Looking Ahead chart at No. 115 in 1970.

== Chart performance ==
=== Jimmy Dean ===
Chart (1968)	Peak position
Canadian RPM Country Tracks	14
US Hot Country Songs (Billboard)	21

=== Ed Ames ===
Chart (1969)	Peak position
US Billboard Easy Listening	21
US Cashbox Looking Ahead	115
US Record World Top-Non Rock	19
Canadian RPM Adult Contemporary	22

=== Johnny Cash ===
Chart (1972)	Peak position
Belgium (Ultratop 50 Flanders)	13
Belgium (Ultratop 50 Wallonia)	49
Canada Country Singles (RPM)	1
Netherlands (Single Top 100)	6
Ireland (IRMA)	1
UK Singles (Official Charts)	4
US Billboard Easy Listening	37
US Hot Country Songs (Billboard)	2
