= When You're Hot, You're Hot =

Single by Jerry Reed

from the album When You're Hot, You're Hot
- B-side: "You've Been Cryin'"
- Released: March 1971
- Genre: Country
- Length: 2:18
- Label: RCA Victor
- Songwriter: Jerry Reed
- Producer: Chet Atkins

Jerry Reed singles chronology
"Amos Moses" (1970)	"When You're Hot, You're Hot" (1971)	"Ko-Ko Joe" (1971)

"When You're Hot, You're Hot" is a 1971 crossover single written and recorded by Jerry Reed. The song was his most successful on the country chart, peaking at number one for five weeks. "When You're Hot, You're Hot" was also Jerry Reed's second song to cross over to the Top 40, reaching number nine. It also appeared in the Australian and New Zealand charts. "When You're Hot, You're Hot" was certified gold for sales of one million units by the Recording Industry Association of America.

== Synopsis ==
The refrain states: "When you're hot, you're hot / When you're not, you're not".

The song describes an illegal game of craps being played in a back alley. The singer is having a streak of good luck against his two friends, winning several games in a row. In the second verse, a police officer discovers the game, arrests the participants and "take(s) all that money for evidence". Now the singer uses the same words to acknowledge his predicament, telling the cop "when you're hot, you're hot".

The third verse describes the trio in court to face the punishment, and to the singer's delight, he finds out that the judge presiding over the case is one of his old fishing buddies—whom, as it turns out, he owes money. When the singer attempts to bribe the judge by offering to pay back the money in exchange for a lighter sentence, the judge grins and does the opposite: gives the other two small fines, but sentences the singer to 90 days in jail with the response "when you're hot, you're hot!"

The song ends with the singer going into a tirade against the judge, telling him that if he weren't in his black robe, he'd have been physically attacked, and that someone would have to "collect my welfare, pay for my Cadillac". The judge immediately declares the singer to be in contempt of court.

== Chart performance ==
=== Weekly charts ===
Chart (1971)	Peak position
Australia (Go-Set)	23
Australia (Kent Music Report)	34
U.S. Billboard Hot Country Singles	1
U.S. Billboard Hot 100	9
U.S. Billboard Adult Contemporary Tracks	6
Canadian RPM Country Tracks	1
Canadian RPM Top Singles	4
Canadian RPM Adult Contemporary Tracks	18

=== Year-end charts ===
Chart (1971)	Rank
Canadian RPM Top Singles	62
U.S. Cashbox Top 100	55
U.S. Billboard Hot 100	74
U.S. Country (Billboard)	5

== In popular culture ==
- The chorus lyrics of this song appear at the very end of an episode of The New Scooby-Doo Movies, sung by Scooby and Shaggy as they attend a performance by Jerry Reed, who guest starred in the episode.
- In the 1970s, "When you're hot, you're hot" was used in self-identification promos for WSEE-TV.
- In 2022, the song was used in a March Madness Basketball Tournament commercial for Nissan depicting the mascots of the Duke Blue Devils, Arizona State Sun Devils, and Gonzaga Bulldogs driving down the road in a desert.
