= You Took All the Ramblin' Out of Me =

Single by Jerry Reed

from the album Hot a'Mighty
- B-side: "I'm Not Playing Games"
- Released: December 4, 1972
- Genre: Country
- Length: 2:13
- Label: RCA
- Songwriter: Jerry Reed
- Producers: Chet Atkins; Jerry Reed

Jerry Reed singles chronology
| "Alabama Wild Man" (1971) | "You Took All the Ramblin' Out of Me" (1972) | "Lord, Mr. Ford" (1973) |

"You Took All the Ramblin' Out of Me" is a song written and recorded by American country artist Jerry Reed. It was released in December 1972 as the only single from the album, Hot a'Mighty. The song reached peaks of number 18 on the Hot Country Songs chart and number 8 on the Canadian RPM Country Tracks chart. The song was featured as part of the soundtrack to the video game Grand Theft Auto V, appearing on the in-game country music radio station Rebel Radio.

== Chart performance ==
| Chart (1972–1973) | Peak position |
|---|---|
| U.S. Billboard Hot Country Singles | 18 |
| Canadian RPM Country Tracks | 8 |
