= Jerry Reed =

American country singer, guitarist, songwriter and actor (1937–2008)

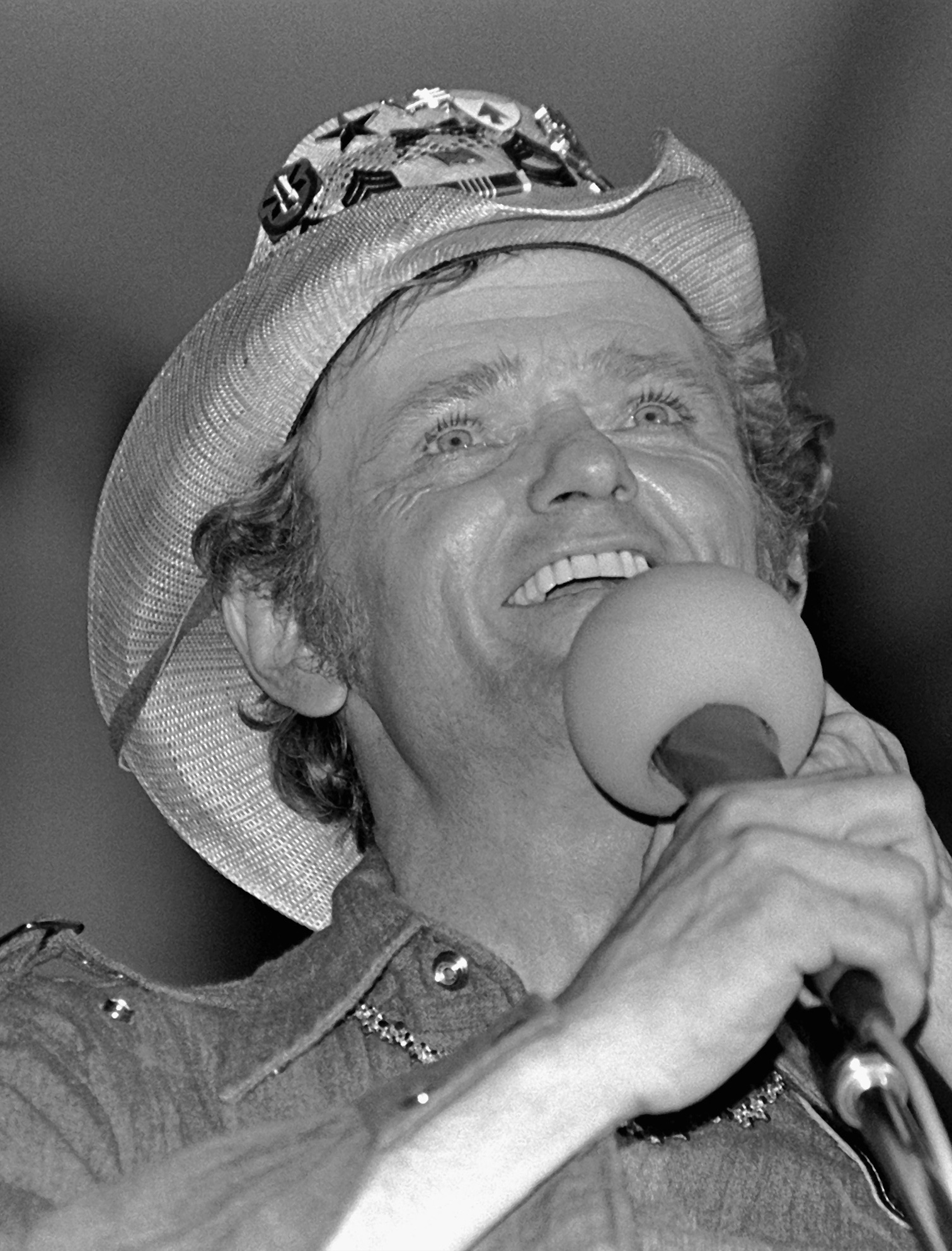
- Reed in 1982

Background information
- Born: Jerry Reed Hubbard; March 20, 1937; Atlanta, Georgia, U.S.
- Died: September 1, 2008 (aged 71) Nashville, Tennessee, U.S.
- Genre: Country
- Occupations: Singer; guitarist; composer; songwriter; actor
- Instruments: Vocals; guitar
- Years active: 1955–2008
- Labels: Capitol; NRC; RCA Victor
- Formerly of: Old Dogs
- Spouse: Priscilla Mitchell (m. 1959)

Jerry Reed Hubbard (March 20, 1937 – September 1, 2008), known professionally as Jerry Reed, was an American country singer, guitarist, composer, songwriter, and actor who appeared in more than a dozen films. His signature songs included "Guitar Man", "U.S. Male", "A Thing Called Love", "Alabama Wild Man", "Amos Moses", "When You're Hot, You're Hot" (which garnered a Grammy Award for Best Male Country Vocal Performance), "Ko-Ko Joe", "Lord, Mr. Ford", "East Bound and Down" (the theme song for the 1977 film Smokey and the Bandit, in which Reed co-starred), "The Bird", and "She Got the Goldmine (I Got the Shaft)".

Reed was inducted into the Musicians Hall of Fame and Museum. He was announced as an inductee into the Country Music Hall of Fame in April 2017, and he was officially inducted by Bobby Bare on October 24.

== Early life ==
Reed was born in Atlanta and was the second child of Robert and Cynthia Hubbard. Reed's grandparents lived in Rockmart and he visited them from time to time. As a small child running around strumming his guitar, he is quoted as saying, "I am gonna be a star. I'm gonna go to Nashville and be a star." Reed's parents separated four months after his birth. He and his sister spent seven years in foster homes or orphanages growing up. Reed was reunited with his mother and stepfather in 1944.

Reed graduated from O'Keefe High School, an Atlanta city school. The O'Keefe building still exists today; it was sold to Georgia Tech and is now part of the university's campus. By high school, Reed was already writing and singing music, having learned to play the guitar as a child. At age 18, he was signed by publisher and record producer Bill Lowery to cut his first record, "If the Good Lord's Willing and the Creek Don't Rise".

At Capitol Records, Reed was promoted as a new "teenage sensation" after recording his own rockabilly composition, "When I Found You", in 1956. He recorded both country and rockabilly singles and found success as a songwriter when labelmate Gene Vincent covered his song "Crazy Legs" in 1958.

By 1958, Bill Lowery signed Reed to his company, National Recording Corporation. He recorded for NRC as both an artist and as a member of the staff band, which included Joe South and Ray Stevens, other NRC artists.

Reed married Priscilla "Prissy" Mitchell in 1959. They had two daughters, one born in 1960 and the other in 1970. Mitchell was a member of folk group the Appalachians ("Bony Moronie", 1963), and with Roy Drusky was co-credited on the 1965 country number-one hit "Yes, Mr. Peters".

== Career ==
In 1959, Reed hit the Billboard "Bubbling Under the Top 100", also known as the Roar, and the Cashbox country chart with the single "Soldier's Joy". After serving two years in the U.S. Army, Reed moved to Nashville in 1961 to continue his songwriting career, which had continued to gather steam while he was in the Army, thanks to Brenda Lee's 1960 cover of his song "That's All You Got to Do". He also became a popular session and tour guitarist. In 1962, he scored some success with two singles "Goodnight Irene" (as by Jerry Reed and the Hully Girlies, featuring a female vocal group) and "Hully Gully Guitar", which found their way to Chet Atkins at RCA Victor, who produced Reed's 1965 "If I Don't Live Up to It".

=== "Guitar Man" ===
In July 1967, Reed had his best showing on the country chart (number 53) with his self-penned "Guitar Man", which Elvis Presley soon covered. Reed's next single was "Tupelo Mississippi Flash", a comic tribute to Presley. Recorded on September 1, the song became his first top-20 hit, going to number 15 on the chart. Coincidentally, Presley came to Nashville to record nine days later, and one of the songs he became especially excited about was "Guitar Man".

Reed recalled how he was tracked down to play on the Presley session: "I was out on the Cumberland River fishing, and I got a call from Felton Jarvis (then Presley's producer at RCA Victor). He said, 'Elvis is down here. We've been trying to cut "Guitar Man" all day long. He wants it to sound like it sounded on your album.' I finally told him, 'Well, if you want it to sound like that, you're going have to get me in there to play guitar, because these guys [you're using in the studio] are straight pickers. I pick with my fingers and tune that guitar up all weird kind of ways.'"

Jarvis hired Reed to play on the session. "I hit that intro, and [Elvis's] face lit up and here we went. Then after he got through that, he cut [my] "U.S. Male" at the same session. I was toppin' cotton, son." Reed also played the guitar for Elvis Presley's "Big Boss Man" (1967), recorded in the same session.

On January 15 and 16, 1968, Reed worked on a second Presley session, during which he played guitar on a cover of Chuck Berry's "Too Much Monkey Business", "Stay Away", and "Goin' Home" (two songs revolving around Presley's film Stay Away, Joe), as well as another Reed composition, "U.S. Male" (Reed's quoted recollection of "U.S. Male" being recorded at the same session as "Guitar Man" being incorrect).

Presley also recorded two other Reed compositions: "A Thing Called Love" in May 1971 for his He Touched Me album, and "Talk About The Good Times" in December 1973, for a total of four.

Johnny Cash also released "A Thing Called Love" as a single in 1971. It reached number two on the Billboard Country Singles Chart for North America, and was also successful in Europe. It became the title track for a studio album, A Thing Called Love, that he released the following spring.

=== 1970s ===
After releasing the 1970 crossover hit "Amos Moses", a hybrid of rock, country, funk, and Cajun styles which reached number eight on the U.S. pop chart, Reed teamed with Atkins for the duet LP Me & Jerry, which earned the pair the Grammy Award for Best Country Instrumental Performance. During the 1970 television season, he was a regular on The Glen Campbell Goodtime Hour, and in 1971, he released his biggest hit, the chart-topper "When You're Hot, You're Hot", which is a story song with most of the lyrics spoken rather than sung. The lyric describes the narrator's near success at shooting dice, a police raid, and a judge who is supposedly a fishing buddy of the singer, who nevertheless sends him up the river for gambling. Aside from being a major crossover hit, "When You're Hot, You're Hot" earned Reed the Grammy Award for Best Country Vocal Performance, Male.

"When You're Hot, You're Hot" was the title track of Reed's eighth solo album, reaching number 9 Pop and number six on Billboard's Easy Listening chart. The singles from the album, "Amos Moses" and "When You're Hot, You're Hot", sold over one million copies, and were awarded gold discs by the RIAA. The album features songs such as Reed's version of "Ruby, Don't Take Your Love to Town" and John D. Loudermilk's free-wheeling song "Big Daddy (Alabama Bound)".

"Reed sustains three identities: redneck crazy, fancy picker, and soap idol. He's a great crazy, greater even on 'Amos Moses' and 'Tupelo Mississippi Flash' than on 'When You're Hot, You're Hot.'"

— Christgau's Record Guide: Rock Albums of the Seventies (1981)

A second collaboration with Atkins, Me & Chet, followed in 1972, as did a series of top-40 singles, which alternated between frenetic, straightforward country offerings and more pop-flavored, countrypolitan material. A year later, he scored his second number-one single with "Lord, Mr. Ford" (written by Deena Kaye Rose), from the album of the same name.

Atkins, who frequently produced Reed's music, remarked that he had to encourage Reed to put instrumental numbers on his own albums, as Reed always considered himself more of a songwriter than a player. Atkins, however, thought Reed was a better fingerstyle player than he was himself; Reed, according to Atkins, helped him work out the fingerpicking for one of Atkins's biggest hits, "Yakety Axe".

Reed was featured in animated form in a December 9, 1972, episode of Hanna–Barbera's The New Scooby-Doo Movies, "The Phantom of the Country Music Hall" (prod. No. 61-10). He sang and played the song "Pretty Mary Sunlight". The song is played throughout the episode as Scooby and the gang search for Reed's missing guitar.

In the mid-1970s, Reed's recording career began to take a back seat to his acting aspirations. In 1974, he co-starred with his close friend Burt Reynolds in the film W.W. and the Dixie Dancekings. While he continued to record throughout the decade, his greatest visibility was as a motion picture star and almost always in tandem with headliner Reynolds, after 1976's Gator. In 1977 he co-starred with Claude Akins in the CBS cop show Nashville 99 and also wrote and performed the theme song. It was cancelled after only four episodes, freeing him up to co-star with Reynolds in Smokey and the Bandit. His song for the movie, "East Bound and Down," landed Reed a number-two hit. He went on to co-star in all three of the Smokey and the Bandit films.

Also in 1977, Reed joined entrepreneur Larry Schmittou and other country music stars, including Conway Twitty, Cal Smith, Larry Gatlin, and Richard Sterban, as investors in the Nashville Sounds, a minor league baseball team of the Double-A Southern League that began play in 1978.

Reed appeared in 1978's High-Ballin' and 1979's Hot Stuff and made two guest appearances on the sitcom Alice in 1978 and 1981. Reed also hosted a TV variety show, filming two episodes of The Jerry Reed Show in 1976. The Sensational Alex Harvey Band released a version of "Amos Moses" in 1976.

In 1979, he released a record comprising both vocal and instrumental selections titled, appropriately enough, Half & Half. It was followed one year later by Jerry Reed Sings Jim Croce, a tribute to the late singer/songwriter. He also starred in a TV movie in that year entitled Concrete Cowboys.

=== 1980s and 1990s ===
In January 1980, Reed began work on the "Guitar Man" re-recording being produced by Presley's producer Felton Jarvis. With a new "hopped up" guitar line and Presley on lead vocals, the song reached number one on the country chart.

In 1982, Reed's career as a singles artist was revitalized by the chart-topping hit "She Got the Goldmine (I Got the Shaft)", followed by "The Bird", which peaked at number two. Also in 1982, Reed headlined a syndicated TV special, Jerry Reed and Friends. The special, a "music-filled celebrity picnic", was filmed at the Hermitage Landing. It included guest stars Burt Reynolds, Louise Mandrell, Brenda Lee, Jimmy Dean, Glen Campbell, Vicki Lawrence, Faron Young, and the Statler Brothers. Reed and Campbell performed the hit "Southern Nights", with Campbell relating how the song's guitar lick had been shown to him by Reed some years before.

His last chart hit, "I'm a Slave", appeared in 1983. In the same year, he co-starred with Robin Williams and Walter Matthau in the Michael Ritchie comedy The Survivors. Reed guest-starred in the October 13, 1983, episode of Mama's Family, "The Return of Leonard Oates" (episode 13, season two), as Naomi Harper's ex-husband.

He accepted an invitation to open for the British group Dexys Midnight Runners in the US in 1984, yet left the tour early to appear on the country music comedy TV show Hee-Haw. In 1985, Reed was the star of a film titled "What Comes Around" which co-starred Bo Hopkins, Barry Corbin, and Arte Johnson, about a burned-out country music performer who tries to get back on the straight and narrow. Reed subsequently produced and directed the film.

After an unsuccessful 1986 LP, Lookin' at You, Reed focused on touring until 1992, when Atkins and he reunited for the album Sneakin' Around, before he again returned to the road. In the meantime, Reed appeared in several interviews and commercial spots for Mid-South Wrestling.

Reed had a role as a commander/Huey pilot for Danny Glover's character in the 1988 movie Bat*21 starring Gene Hackman. He also acted as executive producer on this film.

Reed starred in the 1998 Adam Sandler film The Waterboy as Red Beaulieu, the movie's chief antagonist and the head coach for the University of Louisiana Cougars football team. Actor Henry Winkler recounts that Reed taught him how to bass fish while on location for this movie. It was Reed's final film role before his death in 2008.

He teamed up with country superstars Waylon Jennings, Mel Tillis, and Bobby Bare in the group Old Dogs. They recorded one album in 1998, entitled Old Dogs, with songs written by Shel Silverstein. Reed sang lead on "Young Man's Job" and "Elvis Has Left the Building", the latter possibly in deference to Elvis helping launch his career.

In 1998, American rock band Primus covered the Reed song "Amos Moses" on the EP titled Rhinoplasty.

=== 2000s ===
In October 2004, "Amos Moses" was featured on the Grand Theft Auto: San Andreas soundtrack, which played on the fictional radio station K-Rose. In 2007, the British band Alabama 3 (known as A3 in the U.S.) covered his hit "Amos Moses" on their album, M.O.R.

In June 2005, American guitarist Eric Johnson released his album Bloom, which contained a track titled "Tribute to Jerry Reed" in commemoration of his works.

"She Got the Goldmine (I Got the Shaft)" was used in the 2010 film, The Bounty Hunter. It plays during the scene where Milo (Gerard Butler) searches Nicole's (Jennifer Aniston) apartment.

"You Took All the Ramblin' Out of Me" was used in the 2013 video game Grand Theft Auto V, on the radio station Rebel Radio.

"Talk About the Good Times" was used as the opening theme for the 2022 streaming TV series Sprung in all but the first episode. The entire song closed the final episode.

== Personal life and death ==
Reed married country singer Priscilla Mitchell on July 9, 1959; they had two daughters (Seidina Ann Hubbard, born April 2, 1960, and Charlotte Elaine "Lottie" Zavala, born October 19, 1970), who also became country singers.

Reed died in Nashville on September 1, 2008, of complications from emphysema, at the age of 71. A week later, during their debut at the Grand Ole Opry, Canadian country rock group the Road Hammers performed "East Bound and Down" as a tribute. In a tribute in Vintage Guitar, Rich Kienzle wrote, "Reed set a standard that inspires fingerstyle players the way Merle and Chet inspired him." His wife died following a short illness on September 24, 2014, at the age of 73.

Reed was a heavy cigarette smoker. Thom Bresh, son of Merle Travis and a close friend of Reed's, produced a 1990s video with Reed acting out his desire to quit smoking ("Jerry Reed - Another Puff", which was his first 1972 released single) that serves as a public-service video from Reed on the dangers of smoking cigarettes.

== Style and influences ==
CMT called Jerry Reed "a genuine original who helped take country music and the country lifestyle to a larger mainstream audience." Reed's "influence on American guitar playing is held by some to be comparable to that of Django Reinhardt, and several of his songs have become country rock standards", according to The Guardian. Rock Guitar For Dummies described Reed as one of the great rockabilly musicians. Reed's syncopated guitar playing style was influenced by Merle Travis and Earl Scruggs; this style was nicknamed the "claw", due to the appearance of Reed's hand as he played. Reed's guitar playing also showed the influence of the blues. Reed was also influenced by comedians, saying that he admired them as much as musicians. Reed's vocal performances on some of his singles were also described as a prototype to rap vocals. Rapper Cowboy Troy said that Charlie Daniels and Jerry Reed's vocal delivery "was called recitations at that time, but if you listened to it now, you'd probably call it a rap". Brad Paisley said that he was influenced by Reed's "overall artistry and persona", as well as "his total musicianship [...] anyone who picks a country guitar knows of his mastery of the instrument [...] [Reed was] one of the most inspirational stylists in the history of country music.”

== Accolades ==
Country Music Association

- 1970 CMA Instrumentalist of the Year
- 1971 CMA Instrumentalist of the Year

Grammy Awards

- 1971 Best Country Instrumental Performance - with Chet Atkins for Me & Jerry
- 1972 Best Country Vocal Performance, Male - "When You're Hot, You're Hot"
- 1993 Best Country Instrumental Performance - with Chet Atkins for Sneakin' Around

== Discography ==
=== Solo studio albums ===
- The Unbelievable Guitar and Voice of Jerry Reed (1967)
- Nashville Underground (1968)
- Alabama Wild Man (1968)
- Better Things in Life (1969)
- Jerry Reed Explores Guitar Country (1969)
- Cookin' (1970)
- Georgia Sunshine (1970)
- When You're Hot, You're Hot (1971)
- Ko-Ko Joe (1971)
- Smell the Flowers (1972)
- Jerry Reed (1972)
- Hot a'Mighty! (1973)
- Lord, Mr. Ford (1973)
- The Uptown Poker Club (1973)
- A Good Woman's Love (1974)
- Mind Your Love (1975)
- Red Hot Picker (1975)
- Both Barrels (1976)
- Jerry Reed Rides Again (1977)
- Sweet Love Feelings (1978)
- Half Singin' and Half Pickin' (1979)
- Jerry Reed Sings Jim Croce (1980)
- Texas Bound and Flyin' (1980)
- Dixie Dreams (1981)
- The Man with the Golden Thumb (1982)
- The Bird (1982)
- Ready (1983)
- My Best to You (1984)
- Lookin' at You (1986)
- Flyin' High (1995)
- Pickin' (1999)
- Finger Dancing (2000)
- Jerry Reed Visits Hit Row (2000)
- Let's Git It On (2006)
- The Gallant Few (2008)

== Filmography ==
Film and television
Year	Title	Role	Notes
1972	The New Scooby-Doo Movies	Himself (voice)	Episode: "The Phantom of the Country Music Hall"
1975	W.W. and the Dixie Dancekings	Wayne	Feature film
1976	Gator	"Bama" McCall	Feature film
1977	Nashville 99	Det. Trace Mayne	Main cast (four episodes)
1977	Smokey and the Bandit	Cledus Snow ("Snowman", CB handle)	Feature film
1978	High-Ballin'	Iron Duke Boykin	Feature film
1978	Alice	Himself (guest star)	Episode: "The Star in the Storeroom"
1979	Hot Stuff	Doug von Horne	Feature film
1979	Concrete Cowboys	J.D. Reed	Television film
1980	Smokey and the Bandit II	Cledus Snow ("Snowman", CB handle)	Feature film
1981	Alice	Himself (guest star)	Episode: "The Jerry Reed Fish Story"
1981	Concrete Cowboys	J.D. Reed	Main cast (seven episodes)
1982	Madame's Place	Himself	Episode: "Chopper the Shocker"
1983	The Survivors	Jack Locke	Feature film
1983	Smokey and the Bandit Part 3	Cledus Snow ("Snowman, CB handle)	Feature film
1983	Mama's Family	Leonard Oates	Episode: "The Return of Leonard Oates"
1983	Stroker Ace	Himself (end credit outtakes)	Uncredited
1985	What Comes Around	Joe Hawkins	Feature film (also director)
1987	Dolly	Willie Jeffcoat	Episode 1.8
1988	Bat*21	Col. George Walker	Feature film (also executive producer)
1990	B.L. Stryker	Bill	Episode: "Plates"
1994	Evening Shade	Calvin	Episode: "Educating Calvin"
1998	The Waterboy	Coach Red Beaulieu	Feature film (final film role)
