= The Definitive Collection (Elvis Presley album) =

Greatest hits album by Elvis Presley
- Released: 2005; April 24, 2006 (EU/AUS 4-cd set)
- Recorded: July 5, 1954 – February 4, 1976 at various locations
- Genres: Rock and roll; rockabilly; country; pop
- Length: 4:55:00
- Labels: Reader's Digest Association; Sony BMG
- Producer: Richard Dinnadge

Elvis Presley chronology
Hitstory (2005)	The Definitive Collection (2005)	Elvis Inspirational (2006)

The Definitive Collection is a greatest hits collection by American rock and roll singer and musician Elvis Presley. It was first released in 2005, as a European album, by Reader's Digest Association, and distributed by Sony BMG, as a five-disc set, containing 115 songs. It was later released in Europe and Australia, on April 24, 2016, as a four-disc set, containing 93 songs. The album was then made available for download, through digital platforms. The 5-disc set was released in South America, and the 4-disc in Europe.

The European 5-disc release includes a 28-page booklet, containing 16 pictures of Elvis, except for the German release, which includes 14 pictures, whereas the European and Australian 4-disc edition includes a 24-page booklet, containing 14 pictures of Elvis. All releases' booklets include liner notes about Elvis' life. The European digital download presents a different track order, and contains one extra song, with a total of 94, and the South American digital download suffered a small alteration in the track order.

== Track listing ==
=== Europe 5-CD Set ===
CD 1: All Shook Up 1954-1956
No.	Title	Writer(s)	Producer(s)	Length
1.	"That's All Right" (Remastered)	Arthur Crudup	Sam Phillips	1:57
2.	"Heartbreak Hotel"	Mae Boren Axton; Thomas Durden; Elvis Presley	Steve Sholes	2:08
3.	"Blue Suede Shoes" (Remastered)	Carl Perkins	Steve Sholes	1:59
4.	"Money Honey"	Jesse Stone	Steve Sholes	2:35
5.	"I Want You, I Need You, I Love You" (Remastered)	Tom Hamilton (uncredited); Maurice Mysels; Ira Kosloff	Steve Sholes	2:39
6.	"My Baby Left Me"	Arthur Crudup	Steve Sholes	2:11
7.	"Don't Be Cruel"	Otis Blackwell; Elvis Presley	Steve Sholes	2:02
8.	"Hound Dog"	Jerry Leiber and Mike Stoller	Steve Sholes	2:13
9.	"Blue Moon"	Richard Rodgers; Lorenz Hart	Sam Phillips	2:39
10.	"I Don't Care If The Sun Don't Shine"	Mack David	Steve Sholes	2:27
11.	"Love Me Tender"	George R. Poulton; Ken Darby; Elvis Presley	Ernie Oehlrich; Thorne Norgar	2:42
12.	"Anyway You Want Me (That's How I Will Be)"	Cliff Owens; Aaron Schroeder	Steve Sholes	2:14
13.	"When My Blue Moon Turns to Gold Again"	Wiley Walker; Gene Sullivan	Steve Sholes	2:21
14.	"Love Me" (New Sound Remastered)	Jerry Leiber and Mike Stoller	Steve Sholes	2:43
15.	"Too Much"	Lee Rosenberg; Bernard Weinman	Steve Sholes	2:34
16.	"Paralyzed"	Otis Blackwell; Elvis Presley	Steve Sholes	2:23
17.	"Poor Boy"	Elvis Presley; Vera Matson	Steve Sholes	2:13
18.	"Old Shep"	Red Foley; Arthur Williamsen	Steve Sholes	4:10
19.	"Playing For Keeps"	Stan Kesler	Steve Sholes	2:50
20.	"All Shook Up"	Otis Blackwell; Elvis Presley	Steve Sholes	1:57
21.	"That's When Your Heartaches Begin"	Fred Fisher; William Raskin; Billy Hill	Steve Sholes	3:24

CD 2: Jailhouse Rock 1957-1958
No.	Title	Writer(s)	Producer(s)	Length
1.	"Mystery Train"	Junior Parker	Sam Phillips	2:25
2.	"Rip It Up"	Robert Blackwell; John Marascalco	Steve Sholes	1:53
3.	"(Let Me Be Your) Teddy Bear"	Kal Mann; Bernie Lowe	Walter Scharf	1:45
4.	"(There'll Be) Peace In The Valley (For Me)"	Thomas A. Dorsey	Steve Sholes	3:21
5.	"(Let's Have A) Party"	Jessie Mae Robinson	Ken Nelson	1:28
6.	"Got a Lot o' Livin' to Do!"	Aaron Schroeder; Ben Weisman	Steve Sholes	2:31
7.	"Loving You" (Remastered)	Jerry Leiber and Mike Stoller	Steve Sholes	2:14
8.	"Jailhouse Rock"	Jerry Leiber and Mike Stoller	Jerry Leiber and Mike Stoller	2:34
9.	"Trying To Get To You"	Rose Marie McCoy; Charles Singleton	Sam Phillips	2:32
10.	"Lawdy Miss Clawdy"	Lloyd Price	Steve Sholes	2:08
11.	"Santa Bring My Baby Back (To Me)"	Aaron Schroeder; Claude Demetrius	Steve Sholes	1:52
12.	"I'm Left, You're Right, She's Gone"	Stan Kesler; William Taylor	Steve Sholes	2:36
13.	"Treat Me Nice" (Remastered)	Jerry Leiber and Mike Stoller	Jerry Leiber and Mike Stoller	2:11
14.	"Don't" (with The Jordanaires)	Jerry Leiber and Mike Stoller	Jerry Leiber and Mike Stoller	2:48
15.	"Hard Headed Woman"	Claude Demetrius	Steve Sholes	1:54
16.	"I Beg of You"	Rose Marie McCoy	Steve Sholes	1:51
17.	"Wear My Ring Around Your Neck" (Remastered) (with The Jordanaires)	Bert Carroll; Russell Moody	Steve Sholes	2:15
18.	"Doncha' Think It's Time"	Luther Dixon; Clyde Otis	Steve Sholes	1:55
19.	"Trouble" (Remastered)	Jerry Leiber and Mike Stoller	Jerry Leiber and Mike Stoller	2:17
20.	"I Got Stung" (Remastered) (with The Jordanaires)	Aaron Schroeder; David Hill	Steve Sholes	1:49
21.	"One Night"	Dave Bartholomew; Pearl King; Anita Steinman	Steve Sholes	2:34

CD 3: Fame And Fortune 1958-1962
No.	Title	Writer(s)	Producer(s)	Length
1.	"King Creole" (with The Jordanaires)	Jerry Leiber and Mike Stoller	Felton Jarvis	2:09
2.	"(Now and Then There's) A Fool Such as I"	Bill Trader	Steve Sholes	2:38
3.	"I Need Your Love Tonight" (New Sound Remastered) (with The Jordanaires)	Sid Wayne; Bix Reichner	Steve Sholes	2:05
4.	"A Big Hunk O' Love"	Aaron Schroeder; Sidney Wyche	Steve Sholes	2:13
5.	"My Wish Came True"	Ivory Joe Hunter	Steve Sholes	2:34
6.	"Fame And Fortune"	Fred Wise; Ben Weisman	Steve Sholes	2:29
7.	"Stuck on You"	Aaron Schroeder; J. Leslie McFarland	Steve Sholes	2:18
8.	"It's Now Or Never"	Wally Gold; Aaron Schroeder; Eduardo di Capua	Steve Sholes	3:14
9.	"A Mess of Blues" (New Sound Remastered) (with The Jordanaires)	Doc Pomus; Mort Shuman	Steve Sholes	2:40
10.	"Are You Lonesome Tonight?" (Remastered)	Lou Handman; Roy Turk	Steve Sholes; Chet Atkins	3:06
11.	"I Gotta Know"	Paul Evans; Matt Williams	Steve Sholes	2:15
12.	"Wooden Heart"	Fred Wise; Ben Weisman; Kay Twomey; Bert Kaempfert	Steve Sholes	2:02
13.	"Lonely Man"	Bennie Benjamin; Sol Marcus	Steve Sholes	2:44
14.	"Surrender"	Doc Pomus; Mort Shuman; Ernesto De Curtis	Steve Sholes	1:52
15.	"Flaming Star"	Sid Wayne; Sherman Edwards	Steve Sholes	2:25
16.	"I Feel So Bad" (New Sound Remastered)	Chuck Willis	Steve Sholes	2:54
17.	"Wild In The Country"	Hugo Peretti; Luigi Creatore; George Weiss	Steve Sholes	1:52
18.	"(Marie's the Name) His Latest Flame"	Doc Pomus; Mort Shuman	Steve Sholes	2:06
19.	"Little Sister" (Remastered)	Doc Pomus; Mort Shuman	Steve Sholes	2:31
20.	"Rock-A-Hula Baby" (New Sound Remastered) (with The Jordanaires)	Ben Weisman; Fred Wise; Dolores Fuller	Steve Sholes	1:58
21.	"Can't Help Falling In Love"	Hugo Peretti; Luigi Creatore; George Weiss	Elvis Presley; Joseph Lilley	2:57
22.	"Good Luck Charm"	Aaron Schroeder; Wally Gold	Steve Sholes	2:05
23.	"Anything That's Part Of You"	Don Robertson	Steve Sholes	2:24
24.	"Follow That Dream"	Fred Wise; Ben Weisman	Steve Sholes	1:37
25.	"She's Not You" (Remastered)	Jerry Leiber; Mike Stoller; Doc Pomus	Steve Sholes; Chet Atkins	2:09
26.	"Just Tell Her Jim Said Hello"	Jerry Leiber and Mike Stoller	Steve Sholes	1:53
27.	"King Of The Whole Wide World"	Bob Roberts; Ruth Bachelor	Steve Sholes	2:41
28.	"Return To Sender"	Winfield Scott; Otis Blackwell	Steve Sholes; Chet Atkins	2:09

CD 4: Viva Las Vegas 1963-1968
No.	Title	Writer(s)	Producer(s)	Length
1.	"(You're The) Devil In Disguise"	Bill Giant; Bernie Baum; Florence Kaye	Steve Sholes	2:20
2.	"One Broken Heart For Sale"	Otis Blackwell; Winfield Scott	Leith Stevens	1:46
3.	"Bossa Nova Baby" (Remastered)	Jerry Leiber and Mike Stoller	Steve Sholes	2:06
4.	"Witchcraft"	Dave Bartholomew; Pearl King	Steve Sholes	2:22
5.	"They Remind Me Too Much Of You"	Don Robertson	Leith Stevens	2:30
6.	"Kiss Me Quick"	Doc Pomus; Mort Shuman	Steve Sholes	2:46
7.	"Viva Las Vegas" (Remastered)	Doc Pomus; Mort Shuman	George Stoll	2:26
8.	"Kissin' Cousins"	Fred Wise; Randy Starr	Steve Sholes	2:12
9.	"What'd I Say"	Ray Charles	George Stoll	3:02
10.	"Such A Night"	Lincoln Chase	Steve Sholes; Chet Atkins	2:59
11.	"Ain't That Loving You Baby"	Clyde Otis; Ivory Joe Hunter	Steve Sholes	1:48
12.	"Blue Christmas"	Billy Hayes; Jay W. Johnson	Steve Sholes	2:07
13.	"Do The Clam"	Dolores Fuller; Sid Wayne; Ben Weisman	George Stoll	3:20
14.	"Crying In The Chapel"	Darrell Glenn	Steve Sholes	2:23
15.	"Big Boss Man"	Luther Dixon; Al Smith	Steve Sholes	2:51
16.	"(Such An) Easy Question"	Otis Blackwell; Winfield Scott	Steve Sholes	2:19
17.	"Frankie and Johnny"	Alex Gottlieb; Ben Weisman; Frederick Karger	Steve Sholes	2:33
18.	"Love Letters"	Edward Heyman; Victor Young	Steve Sholes	2:50
19.	"Guitar Man"	Jerry Reed	Steve Sholes	2:15
20.	"U.S. Male"	Jerry Reed	Steve Sholes	2:42
21.	"You'll Never Walk Alone"	Rodgers and Hammerstein	Steve Sholes	2:42
22.	"If I Can Dream" (Stereo Mix)	Walter Earl Brown	Steve Sholes	3:10

CD 5: Always On My Mind 1969-2003
No.	Title	Writer(s)	Producer(s)	Length
1.	"In the Ghetto"	Mac Davis	Chips Moman	2:56
2.	"Suspicious Minds"	Mark James	Chips Moman; Felton Jarvis	4:31
3.	"The Wonder Of You" (Live)	Baker Knight	Steve Sholes	2:26
4.	"You Don't Have to Say You Love Me" (Remastered)	Vicki Wickham; Simon Napier-Bell; Pino Donaggio; Vito Pallavicini	Felton Jarvis	2:30
5.	"I Just Can't Help Believing" (Live)	Barry Mann; Cynthia Weil	Felton Jarvis	4:34
6.	"I'm Leavin'"	Sonny Charles; Michael Jarrett	Steve Sholes	3:50
7.	"Until It's Time for You to Go" (Live)	Buffy Sainte-Marie	Steve Sholes	3:56
8.	"An American Trilogy" (New Sound Remastered)	Mickey Newbury	Steve Sholes	4:38
9.	"Burning Love"	Dennis Linde	Felton Jarvis	2:56
10.	"Always On My Mind" (Remastered)	Wayne Carson; Johnny Christopher; Mark James	Felton Jarvis	3:37
11.	"Fool"	Carl Sigman; James Last	Steve Sholes	2:41
12.	"Promised Land" (New Sound Remastered)	Chuck Berry	Felton Jarvis	2:57
13.	"My Boy"	Phil Coulter; Bill Martin; Jean-Pierre Bourtayre; Claude François	Felton Jarvis	3:19
14.	"T-R-O-U-B-L-E"	Jerry Chesnut	Felton Jarvis	3:03
15.	"Hurt"	Jimmie Crane; Al Jacobs	Felton Jarvis	2:07
16.	"The Girl Of My Best Friend"	Beverly Ross; Sam Bobrick	Steve Sholes; Chet Atkins	2:21
17.	"Moody Blue"	Mark James	Felton Jarvis	2:48
18.	"She Thinks I Still Care"	Dickey Lee; Steve Duffy	Felton Jarvis	3:46
19.	"Suspicion"	Doc Pomus; Mort Shuman	Felton Jarvis	2:34
20.	"Way Down"	Layng Martine Jr.	Felton Jarvis	2:36
21.	"My Way" (Live)	Paul Anka; Claude François	Felton Jarvis	4:00
22.	"A Little Less Conversation" (JXL Remix Radio Edit)	Mac Davis; Billy Strange	JXL; Ad Bradley	3:31
23.	"Rubberneckin'" (Paul Oakenfold Remix Radio Edit)	Dory Jones; Bunny Warren	Paul Oakenfold	3:29
Total length:				4:55:00

=== Europe / Australia 4-CD Set ===
CD 1: All Shook Up 1954-1956
No.	Title	Writer(s)	Producer(s)	Length
1.	"That's All Right" (Remastered)	Arthur Crudup	Sam Phillips	1:57
2.	"Heartbreak Hotel"	Mae Boren Axton; Thomas Durden; Elvis Presley	Steve Sholes	2:08
3.	"Blue Suede Shoes" (Remastered)	Carl Perkins	Steve Sholes	1:59
4.	"I Want You, I Need You, I Love You" (Remastered)	Tom Hamilton (uncredited); Maurice Mysels; Ira Kosloff	Steve Sholes	2:39
5.	"My Baby Left Me"	Arthur Crudup	Steve Sholes	2:11
6.	"Don't Be Cruel"	Otis Blackwell; Elvis Presley	Steve Sholes	2:02
7.	"Hound Dog"	Jerry Leiber and Mike Stoller	Steve Sholes	2:13
8.	"Blue Moon"	Richard Rodgers; Lorenz Hart	Sam Phillips	2:39
9.	"Love Me Tender"	George R. Poulton; Ken Darby; Elvis Presley	Ernie Oehlrich; Thorne Norgar	2:42
10.	"Love Me" (New Sound Remastered)	Jerry Leiber and Mike Stoller	Steve Sholes	2:43
11.	"Too Much"	Lee Rosenberg; Bernard Weinman	Steve Sholes	2:34
12.	"Paralyzed"	Otis Blackwell; Elvis Presley	Steve Sholes	2:23
13.	"Playing For Keeps"	Stan Kesler	Steve Sholes	2:50
14.	"All Shook Up"	Otis Blackwell; Elvis Presley	Steve Sholes	1:57
15.	"That's When Your Heartaches Begin"	Fred Fisher; William Raskin; Billy Hill	Steve Sholes	3:24
16.	"Mystery Train"	Junior Parker	Sam Phillips	2:25
17.	"(Let Me Be Your) Teddy Bear"	Kal Mann; Bernie Lowe	Walter Scharf	1:45
18.	"(Let's Have A) Party"	Jessie Mae Robinson	Ken Nelson	1:28
19.	"Got a Lot o' Livin' to Do!"	Aaron Schroeder; Ben Weisman	Steve Sholes	2:31
20.	"Loving You" (Remastered)	Jerry Leiber and Mike Stoller	Steve Sholes	2:14
21.	"Jailhouse Rock"	Jerry Leiber and Mike Stoller	Jerry Leiber and Mike Stoller	2:34
22.	"Lawdy Miss Clawdy"	Lloyd Price	Steve Sholes	2:08
23.	"Treat Me Nice" (Remastered)	Jerry Leiber and Mike Stoller	Jerry Leiber and Mike Stoller	2:11
24.	"Don't" (with The Jordanaires)	Jerry Leiber and Mike Stoller	Jerry Leiber and Mike Stoller	2:48

CD 2: Fame And Fortune 1958-1962
No.	Title	Writer(s)	Producer(s)	Length
1.	"Hard Headed Woman"	Claude Demetrius	Steve Sholes	1:54
2.	"I Beg of You"	Rose Marie McCoy	Steve Sholes	1:51
3.	"Wear My Ring Around Your Neck" (Remastered) (with The Jordanaires)	Bert Carroll; Russell Moody	Steve Sholes	2:15
4.	"Doncha' Think It's Time"	Luther Dixon; Clyde Otis	Steve Sholes	1:55
5.	"I Got Stung" (Remastered) (with The Jordanaires)	Aaron Schroeder; David Hill	Steve Sholes	1:49
6.	"One Night"	Dave Bartholomew; Pearl King; Anita Steinman	Steve Sholes	2:34
7.	"King Creole" (with The Jordanaires)	Jerry Leiber and Mike Stoller	Felton Jarvis	2:09
8.	"(Now and Then There's) A Fool Such as I"	Bill Trader	Steve Sholes	2:38
9.	"I Need Your Love Tonight" (New Sound Remastered) (with The Jordanaires)	Sid Wayne; Bix Reichner	Steve Sholes	2:05
10.	"A Big Hunk O' Love"	Aaron Schroeder; Sidney Wyche	Steve Sholes	2:13
11.	"My Wish Came True"	Ivory Joe Hunter	Steve Sholes	2:34
12.	"Fame And Fortune"	Fred Wise; Ben Weisman	Steve Sholes	2:29
13.	"Stuck on You"	Aaron Schroeder; J. Leslie McFarland	Steve Sholes	2:18
14.	"It's Now Or Never"	Wally Gold; Aaron Schroeder; Eduardo di Capua	Steve Sholes	3:14
15.	"A Mess of Blues" (New Sound Remastered) (with The Jordanaires)	Doc Pomus; Mort Shuman	Steve Sholes	2:40
16.	"Are You Lonesome Tonight?" (Remastered)	Lou Handman; Roy Turk	Steve Sholes; Chet Atkins	3:06
17.	"I Gotta Know"	Paul Evans; Matt Williams	Steve Sholes	2:15
18.	"Wooden Heart"	Fred Wise; Ben Weisman; Kay Twomey; Bert Kaempfert	Steve Sholes	2:02
19.	"Lonely Man"	Bennie Benjamin; Sol Marcus	Steve Sholes	2:44
20.	"Surrender"	Doc Pomus; Mort Shuman; Ernesto De Curtis	Steve Sholes	1:52
21.	"I Feel So Bad" (New Sound Remastered)	Chuck Willis	Steve Sholes	2:54
22.	"Wild In The Country"	Hugo Peretti; Luigi Creatore; George Weiss	Steve Sholes	1:52
23.	"(Marie's the Name) His Latest Flame"	Doc Pomus; Mort Shuman	Steve Sholes	2:06
24.	"Little Sister" (Remastered)	Doc Pomus; Mort Shuman	Steve Sholes	2:31
25.	"Rock-A-Hula Baby" (New Sound Remastered) (with The Jordanaires)	Ben Weisman; Fred Wise; Dolores Fuller	Steve Sholes	1:58
26.	"Can't Help Falling In Love"	Hugo Peretti; Luigi Creatore; George Weiss	Elvis Presley; Joseph Lilley	2:57

CD 3: King Of The Whole Wide World 1962 - 1967
No.	Title	Writer(s)	Producer(s)	Length
1.	"Good Luck Charm"	Aaron Schroeder; Wally Gold	Steve Sholes	2:05
2.	"Anything That's Part Of You"	Don Robertson	Steve Sholes	2:24
3.	"She's Not You" (Remastered)	Jerry Leiber; Mike Stoller; Doc Pomus	Steve Sholes; Chet Atkins	2:09
4.	"Just Tell Her Jim Said Hello"	Jerry Leiber and Mike Stoller	Steve Sholes	1:53
5.	"King Of The Whole Wide World"	Bob Roberts; Ruth Bachelor	Steve Sholes	2:41
6.	"Return To Sender"	Winfield Scott; Otis Blackwell	Steve Sholes; Chet Atkins	2:09
7.	"(You're The) Devil In Disguise"	Bill Giant; Bernie Baum; Florence Kaye	Steve Sholes	2:20
8.	"One Broken Heart For Sale"	Otis Blackwell; Winfield Scott	Leith Stevens	1:46
9.	"Bossa Nova Baby" (Remastered)	Jerry Leiber and Mike Stoller	Steve Sholes	2:06
10.	"Kiss Me Quick"	Doc Pomus; Mort Shuman	Steve Sholes	2:46
11.	"Viva Las Vegas" (Remastered)	Doc Pomus; Mort Shuman	George Stoll	2:26
12.	"Kissin' Cousins"	Fred Wise; Randy Starr	Steve Sholes	2:12
13.	"Such A Night"	Lincoln Chase	Steve Sholes; Chet Atkins	2:59
14.	"Ain't That Loving You Baby"	Clyde Otis; Ivory Joe Hunter	Steve Sholes	1:48
15.	"Blue Christmas"	Billy Hayes; Jay W. Johnson	Steve Sholes	2:07
16.	"Do The Clam"	Dolores Fuller; Sid Wayne; Ben Weisman	George Stoll	3:20
17.	"Crying In The Chapel"	Darrell Glenn	Steve Sholes	2:23
18.	"Big Boss Man"	Luther Dixon; Al Smith	Steve Sholes	2:51
19.	"(Such An) Easy Question"	Otis Blackwell; Winfield Scott	Steve Sholes	2:19
20.	"Frankie and Johnny"	Alex Gottlieb; Ben Weisman; Frederick Karger	Steve Sholes	2:33
21.	"Love Letters"	Edward Heyman; Victor Young	Steve Sholes	2:50

CD 4: Always On My Mind 1969-2003
No.	Title	Writer(s)	Producer(s)	Length
1.	"Guitar Man"	Jerry Reed	Steve Sholes	2:15
2.	"U.S. Male"	Jerry Reed	Steve Sholes	2:42
3.	"If I Can Dream" (Stereo Mix)	Walter Earl Brown	Steve Sholes	3:10
4.	"In the Ghetto"	Mac Davis	Chips Moman	2:56
5.	"Suspicious Minds"	Mark James	Chips Moman; Felton Jarvis	4:31
6.	"The Wonder Of You" (Live)	Baker Knight	Steve Sholes	2:26
7.	"I Just Can't Help Believing" (Live)	Barry Mann; Cynthia Weil	Felton Jarvis	4:34
8.	"I'm Leavin'"	Sonny Charles; Michael Jarrett	Steve Sholes	3:50
9.	"Until It's Time for You to Go" (Live)	Buffy Sainte-Marie	Steve Sholes	3:56
10.	"An American Trilogy" (New Sound Remastered)	Mickey Newbury	Steve Sholes	4:38
11.	"Burning Love"	Dennis Linde	Felton Jarvis	2:56
12.	"Always On My Mind" (Remastered)	Wayne Carson; Johnny Christopher; Mark James	Felton Jarvis	3:37
13.	"Promised Land" (New Sound Remastered)	Chuck Berry	Felton Jarvis	2:57
14.	"My Boy"	Phil Coulter; Bill Martin; Jean-Pierre Bourtayre; Claude François	Felton Jarvis	3:19
15.	"T-R-O-U-B-L-E"	Jerry Chesnut	Felton Jarvis	3:03
16.	"The Girl Of My Best Friend"	Beverly Ross; Sam Bobrick	Steve Sholes; Chet Atkins	2:21
17.	"Moody Blue"	Mark James	Felton Jarvis	2:48
18.	"She Thinks I Still Care"	Dickey Lee; Steve Duffy	Felton Jarvis	3:46
19.	"Suspicion"	Doc Pomus; Mort Shuman	Felton Jarvis	2:34
20.	"Way Down"	Layng Martine Jr.	Felton Jarvis	2:36
21.	"A Little Less Conversation" (JXL Remix Radio Edit)	Mac Davis; Billy Strange	JXL; Ad Bradley	3:31
22.	"Rubberneckin'" (Paul Oakenfold Remix Radio Edit)	Dory Jones; Bunny Warren	Paul Oakenfold	3:29
Total length:				4:55:00

=== Europe digital download ===
CD 1: All Shook Up 1954-1956
No.	Title	Writer(s)	Producer(s)	Length
1.	"That's All Right" (Remastered)	Arthur Crudup	Sam Phillips	1:57
2.	"Heartbreak Hotel"	Mae Boren Axton; Thomas Durden; Elvis Presley	Steve Sholes	2:08
3.	"Blue Suede Shoes" (Remastered)	Carl Perkins	Steve Sholes	1:59
4.	"I Want You, I Need You, I Love You" (Remastered)	Tom Hamilton (uncredited); Maurice Mysels; Ira Kosloff	Steve Sholes	2:39
5.	"My Baby Left Me"	Arthur Crudup	Steve Sholes	2:11
6.	"Don't Be Cruel"	Otis Blackwell; Elvis Presley	Steve Sholes	2:02
7.	"Hound Dog"	Jerry Leiber and Mike Stoller	Steve Sholes	2:13
8.	"Blue Moon"	Richard Rodgers; Lorenz Hart	Sam Phillips	2:39
9.	"Love Me Tender"	George R. Poulton; Ken Darby; Elvis Presley	Ernie Oehlrich; Thorne Norgar	2:42
10.	"Love Me" (New Sound Remastered)	Jerry Leiber and Mike Stoller	Steve Sholes	2:43
11.	"Too Much"	Lee Rosenberg; Bernard Weinman	Steve Sholes	2:34
12.	"Paralyzed"	Otis Blackwell; Elvis Presley	Steve Sholes	2:23
13.	"Playing For Keeps"	Stan Kesler	Steve Sholes	2:50
14.	"All Shook Up"	Otis Blackwell; Elvis Presley	Steve Sholes	1:57
15.	"That's When Your Heartaches Begin"	Fred Fisher; William Raskin; Billy Hill	Steve Sholes	3:24
16.	"Mystery Train"	Junior Parker	Sam Phillips	2:25
17.	"(Let Me Be Your) Teddy Bear"	Kal Mann; Bernie Lowe	Walter Scharf	1:45
18.	"(Let's Have A) Party"	Jessie Mae Robinson	Ken Nelson	1:28
19.	"Got a Lot o' Livin' to Do!"	Aaron Schroeder; Ben Weisman	Steve Sholes	2:31
20.	"Loving You" (Remastered)	Jerry Leiber and Mike Stoller	Steve Sholes	2:14
21.	"Jailhouse Rock"	Jerry Leiber and Mike Stoller	Jerry Leiber and Mike Stoller	2:34
22.	"Lawdy Miss Clawdy"	Lloyd Price	Steve Sholes	2:08
23.	"Treat Me Nice" (Remastered)	Jerry Leiber and Mike Stoller	Jerry Leiber and Mike Stoller	2:11
24.	"Don't" (with The Jordanaires)	Jerry Leiber and Mike Stoller	Jerry Leiber and Mike Stoller	2:48

CD 2: Fame And Fortune 1958-1962
No.	Title	Writer(s)	Producer(s)	Length
1.	"Hard Headed Woman"	Claude Demetrius	Steve Sholes	1:54
2.	"I Beg of You"	Rose Marie McCoy	Steve Sholes	1:51
3.	"Wear My Ring Around Your Neck" (Remastered) (with The Jordanaires)	Bert Carroll; Russell Moody	Steve Sholes	2:15
4.	"Doncha' Think It's Time"	Luther Dixon; Clyde Otis	Steve Sholes	1:55
5.	"I Got Stung" (Remastered) (with The Jordanaires)	Aaron Schroeder; David Hill	Steve Sholes	1:49
6.	"One Night"	Dave Bartholomew; Pearl King; Anita Steinman	Steve Sholes	2:34
7.	"King Creole" (with The Jordanaires)	Jerry Leiber and Mike Stoller	Felton Jarvis	2:09
8.	"(Now and Then There's) A Fool Such as I"	Bill Trader	Steve Sholes	2:38
9.	"I Need Your Love Tonight" (New Sound Remastered) (with The Jordanaires)	Sid Wayne; Bix Reichner	Steve Sholes	2:05
10.	"A Big Hunk O' Love"	Aaron Schroeder; Sidney Wyche	Steve Sholes	2:13
11.	"My Wish Came True"	Ivory Joe Hunter	Steve Sholes	2:34
12.	"Fame And Fortune"	Fred Wise; Ben Weisman	Steve Sholes	2:29
13.	"Stuck on You"	Aaron Schroeder; J. Leslie McFarland	Steve Sholes	2:18
14.	"It's Now Or Never"	Wally Gold; Aaron Schroeder; Eduardo di Capua	Steve Sholes	3:14
15.	"A Mess of Blues" (New Sound Remastered) (with The Jordanaires)	Doc Pomus; Mort Shuman	Steve Sholes	2:40
16.	"Are You Lonesome Tonight?" (Remastered)	Lou Handman; Roy Turk	Steve Sholes; Chet Atkins	3:06
17.	"I Gotta Know"	Paul Evans; Matt Williams	Steve Sholes	2:15
18.	"Wooden Heart"	Fred Wise; Ben Weisman; Kay Twomey; Bert Kaempfert	Steve Sholes	2:02
19.	"Lonely Man"	Bennie Benjamin; Sol Marcus	Steve Sholes	2:44
20.	"Surrender"	Doc Pomus; Mort Shuman; Ernesto De Curtis	Steve Sholes	1:52
21.	"I Feel So Bad" (New Sound Remastered)	Chuck Willis	Steve Sholes	2:54
22.	"Wild In The Country"	Hugo Peretti; Luigi Creatore; George Weiss	Steve Sholes	1:52
23.	"(Marie's the Name) His Latest Flame"	Doc Pomus; Mort Shuman	Steve Sholes	2:06
24.	"Little Sister" (Remastered)	Doc Pomus; Mort Shuman	Steve Sholes	2:31
25.	"Rock-A-Hula Baby" (New Sound Remastered) (with The Jordanaires)	Ben Weisman; Fred Wise; Dolores Fuller	Steve Sholes	1:58
26.	"Can't Help Falling In Love"	Hugo Peretti; Luigi Creatore; George Weiss	Elvis Presley; Joseph Lilley	2:57

CD 3: King Of The Whole Wide World 1962 - 1967
No.	Title	Writer(s)	Producer(s)	Length
1.	"Good Luck Charm"	Aaron Schroeder; Wally Gold	Steve Sholes	2:05
2.	"Anything That's Part Of You"	Don Robertson	Steve Sholes	2:24
3.	"She's Not You" (Remastered)	Jerry Leiber; Mike Stoller; Doc Pomus	Steve Sholes; Chet Atkins	2:09
4.	"Just Tell Her Jim Said Hello"	Jerry Leiber and Mike Stoller	Steve Sholes	1:53
5.	"King Of The Whole Wide World"	Bob Roberts; Ruth Bachelor	Steve Sholes	2:41
6.	"Return To Sender"	Winfield Scott; Otis Blackwell	Steve Sholes; Chet Atkins	2:09
7.	"(You're The) Devil In Disguise"	Bill Giant; Bernie Baum; Florence Kaye	Steve Sholes	2:20
8.	"One Broken Heart For Sale"	Otis Blackwell; Winfield Scott	Leith Stevens	1:46
9.	"Bossa Nova Baby" (Remastered)	Jerry Leiber and Mike Stoller	Steve Sholes	2:06
10.	"Kiss Me Quick"	Doc Pomus; Mort Shuman	Steve Sholes	2:46
11.	"Viva Las Vegas" (Remastered)	Doc Pomus; Mort Shuman	George Stoll	2:26
12.	"Kissin' Cousins"	Fred Wise; Randy Starr	Steve Sholes	2:12
13.	"Such A Night"	Lincoln Chase	Steve Sholes; Chet Atkins	2:59
14.	"Ain't That Loving You Baby"	Clyde Otis; Ivory Joe Hunter	Steve Sholes	1:48
15.	"Blue Christmas"	Billy Hayes; Jay W. Johnson	Steve Sholes	2:07
16.	"Do The Clam"	Dolores Fuller; Sid Wayne; Ben Weisman	George Stoll	3:20
17.	"Crying In The Chapel"	Darrell Glenn	Steve Sholes	2:23
18.	"Big Boss Man"	Luther Dixon; Al Smith	Steve Sholes	2:51
19.	"(Such An) Easy Question"	Otis Blackwell; Winfield Scott	Steve Sholes	2:19
20.	"Frankie and Johnny"	Alex Gottlieb; Ben Weisman; Frederick Karger	Steve Sholes	2:33
21.	"Love Letters"	Edward Heyman; Victor Young	Steve Sholes	2:50

CD 4: Always On My Mind 1969-2003
No.	Title	Writer(s)	Producer(s)	Length
1.	"Guitar Man"	Jerry Reed	Steve Sholes	2:15
2.	"U.S. Male"	Jerry Reed	Steve Sholes	2:42
3.	"If I Can Dream" (Stereo Mix)	Walter Earl Brown	Steve Sholes	3:10
4.	"In the Ghetto"	Mac Davis	Chips Moman	2:56
5.	"Suspicious Minds"	Mark James	Chips Moman; Felton Jarvis	4:31
6.	"The Wonder Of You" (Live)	Baker Knight	Steve Sholes	2:26
7.	"You Don't Have to Say You Love Me" (Remastered)	Vicki Wickham; Simon Napier-Bell; Pino Donaggio; Vito Pallavicini	Felton Jarvis	2:30
8.	"I Just Can't Help Believing" (Live)	Barry Mann; Cynthia Weil	Felton Jarvis	4:34
9.	"I'm Leavin'"	Sonny Charles; ett	Steve Sholes	3:50
10.	"Until It's Time for You to Go" (Live)	Buffy Sainte-Marie	Steve Sholes	3:56
11.	"An American Trilogy" (New Sound Remastered)	Mickey Newbury	Steve Sholes	4:38
12.	"Burning Love"	Dennis Linde	Felton Jarvis	2:56
13.	"Always On My Mind" (Remastered)	Wayne Carson; Johnny Christopher; Mark James	Felton Jarvis	3:37
14.	"Promised Land" (New Sound Remastered)	Chuck Berry	Felton Jarvis	2:57
15.	"My Boy"	Phil Coulter; Bill Martin; Jean-Pierre Bourtayre; Claude François	Felton Jarvis	3:19
16.	"T-R-O-U-B-L-E"	Jerry Chesnut	Felton Jarvis	3:03
17.	"The Girl Of My Best Friend"	Beverly Ross; Sam Bobrick	Steve Sholes; Chet Atkins	2:21
18.	"Moody Blue"	Mark James	Felton Jarvis	2:48
19.	"She Thinks I Still Care"	Dickey Lee; Steve Duffy	Felton Jarvis	3:46
20.	"Suspicion"	Doc Pomus; Mort Shuman	Felton Jarvis	2:34
21.	"Way Down"	Layng Martine Jr.	Felton Jarvis	2:36
22.	"A Little Less Conversation" (JXL Remix Radio Edit)	Mac Davis; Billy Strange	JXL; Ad Bradley	3:31
23.	"Rubberneckin'" (Paul Oakenfold Remix Radio Edit)	Dory Jones; Bunny Warren	Paul Oakenfold	3:29
Total length:				4:55:00

=== South America digital download ===
CD 1: All Shook Up 1954-1956
No.	Title	Writer(s)	Producer(s)	Length
1.	"That's All Right" (Remastered)	Arthur Crudup	Sam Phillips	1:57
2.	"Heartbreak Hotel"	Mae Boren Axton; Thomas Durden; Elvis Presley	Steve Sholes	2:08
3.	"Blue Suede Shoes" (Remastered)	Carl Perkins	Steve Sholes	1:59
4.	"Money Honey"	Jesse Stone	Steve Sholes	2:35
5.	"I Want You, I Need You, I Love You" (Remastered)	Tom Hamilton (uncredited); Maurice Mysels; Ira Kosloff	Steve Sholes	2:39
6.	"My Baby Left Me"	Arthur Crudup	Steve Sholes	2:11
7.	"Don't Be Cruel"	Otis Blackwell; Elvis Presley	Steve Sholes	2:02
8.	"Hound Dog"	Jerry Leiber and Mike Stoller	Steve Sholes	2:13
9.	"Blue Moon"	Richard Rodgers; Lorenz Hart	Sam Phillips	2:39
10.	"I Don't Care If The Sun Don't Shine"	Mack David	Steve Sholes	2:27
11.	"Love Me Tender"	George R. Poulton; Ken Darby; Elvis Presley	Ernie Oehlrich; Thorne Norgar	2:42
12.	"Anyway You Want Me (That's How I Will Be)"	Cliff Owens; Aaron Schroeder	Steve Sholes	2:14
13.	"When My Blue Moon Turns to Gold Again"	Wiley Walker; Gene Sullivan	Steve Sholes	2:21
14.	"Love Me" (New Sound Remastered)	Jerry Leiber and Mike Stoller	Steve Sholes	2:43
15.	"Too Much"	Lee Rosenberg; Bernard Weinman	Steve Sholes	2:34
16.	"Paralyzed"	Otis Blackwell; Elvis Presley	Steve Sholes	2:23
17.	"Poor Boy"	Elvis Presley; Vera Matson	Steve Sholes	2:13
18.	"Old Shep"	Red Foley; Arthur Williamsen	Steve Sholes	4:10
19.	"Playing For Keeps"	Stan Kesler	Steve Sholes	2:50
20.	"All Shook Up"	Otis Blackwell; Elvis Presley	Steve Sholes	1:57
21.	"That's When Your Heartaches Begin"	Fred Fisher; William Raskin; Billy Hill	Steve Sholes	3:24

CD 2: Jailhouse Rock 1957-1958
No.	Title	Writer(s)	Producer(s)	Length
1.	"Mystery Train"	Junior Parker	Sam Phillips	2:25
2.	"Rip It Up"	Robert Blackwell; John Marascalco	Steve Sholes	1:53
3.	"(Let Me Be Your) Teddy Bear"	Kal Mann; Bernie Lowe	Walter Scharf	1:45
4.	"(There'll Be) Peace In The Valley (For Me)"	Thomas A. Dorsey	Steve Sholes	3:21
5.	"(Let's Have A) Party"	Jessie Mae Robinson	Ken Nelson	1:28
6.	"Got a Lot o' Livin' to Do!"	Aaron Schroeder; Ben Weisman	Steve Sholes	2:31
7.	"Loving You" (Remastered)	Jerry Leiber and Mike Stoller	Steve Sholes	2:14
8.	"Jailhouse Rock"	Jerry Leiber and Mike Stoller	Jerry Leiber and Mike Stoller	2:34
9.	"Trying To Get To You"	Rose Marie McCoy; Charles Singleton	Sam Phillips	2:32
10.	"Lawdy Miss Clawdy"	Lloyd Price	Steve Sholes	2:08
11.	"Santa Bring My Baby Back (To Me)"	Aaron Schroeder; Claude Demetrius	Steve Sholes	1:52
12.	"I'm Left, You're Right, She's Gone"	Stan Kesler; William Taylor	Steve Sholes	2:36
13.	"Treat Me Nice" (Remastered)	Jerry Leiber and Mike Stoller	Jerry Leiber and Mike Stoller	2:11
14.	"Don't" (with The Jordanaires)	Jerry Leiber and Mike Stoller	Jerry Leiber and Mike Stoller	2:48
15.	"Hard Headed Woman"	Claude Demetrius	Steve Sholes	1:54
16.	"I Beg of You"	Rose Marie McCoy	Steve Sholes	1:51
17.	"Wear My Ring Around Your Neck" (Remastered) (with The Jordanaires)	Bert Carroll; Russell Moody	Steve Sholes	2:15
18.	"Doncha' Think It's Time"	Luther Dixon; Clyde Otis	Steve Sholes	1:55
19.	"Trouble" (Remastered)	Jerry Leiber and Mike Stoller	Jerry Leiber and Mike Stoller	2:17
20.	"I Got Stung" (Remastered) (with The Jordanaires)	Aaron Schroeder; David Hill	Steve Sholes	1:49
21.	"One Night"	Dave Bartholomew; Pearl King; Anita Steinman	Steve Sholes	2:34

CD 3: Fame And Fortune 1958-1962
No.	Title	Writer(s)	Producer(s)	Length
1.	"King Creole" (with The Jordanaires)	Jerry Leiber and Mike Stoller	Felton Jarvis	2:09
2.	"(Now and Then There's) A Fool Such as I"	Bill Trader	Steve Sholes	2:38
3.	"I Need Your Love Tonight" (New Sound Remastered) (with The Jordanaires)	Sid Wayne; Bix Reichner	Steve Sholes	2:05
4.	"A Big Hunk O' Love"	Aaron Schroeder; Sidney Wyche	Steve Sholes	2:13
5.	"My Wish Came True"	Ivory Joe Hunter	Steve Sholes	2:34
6.	"Fame And Fortune"	Fred Wise; Ben Weisman	Steve Sholes	2:29
7.	"Stuck on You"	Aaron Schroeder; J. Leslie McFarland	Steve Sholes	2:18
8.	"It's Now Or Never"	Wally Gold; Aaron Schroeder; Eduardo di Capua	Steve Sholes	3:14
9.	"A Mess of Blues" (New Sound Remastered) (with The Jordanaires)	Doc Pomus; Mort Shuman	Steve Sholes	2:40
10.	"Are You Lonesome Tonight?" (Remastered)	Lou Handman; Roy Turk	Steve Sholes; Chet Atkins	3:06
11.	"I Gotta Know"	Paul Evans; Matt Williams	Steve Sholes	2:15
12.	"Wooden Heart"	Fred Wise; Ben Weisman; Kay Twomey; Bert Kaempfert	Steve Sholes	2:02
13.	"Lonely Man"	Bennie Benjamin; Sol Marcus	Steve Sholes	2:44
14.	"Surrender"	Doc Pomus; Mort Shuman; Ernesto De Curtis	Steve Sholes	1:52
15.	"Flaming Star"	Sid Wayne; Sherman Edwards	Steve Sholes	2:25
16.	"I Feel So Bad" (New Sound Remastered)	Chuck Willis	Steve Sholes	2:54
17.	"Wild In The Country"	Hugo Peretti; Luigi Creatore; George Weiss	Steve Sholes	1:52
18.	"(Marie's the Name) His Latest Flame"	Doc Pomus; Mort Shuman	Steve Sholes	2:06
19.	"Little Sister" (Remastered)	Doc Pomus; Mort Shuman	Steve Sholes	2:31
20.	"Rock-A-Hula Baby" (New Sound Remastered) (with The Jordanaires))	Ben Weisman; Fred Wise; Dolores Fuller	Steve Sholes	1:58
21.	"Can't Help Falling In Love"	Hugo Peretti; Luigi Creatore; George Weiss	Elvis Presley; Joseph Lilley	2:57
22.	"Anything That's Part Of You"	Don Robertson	Steve Sholes	2:24
23.	"Good Luck Charm"	Aaron Schroeder; Wally Gold	Steve Sholes	2:05
24.	"Follow That Dream"	Fred Wise; Ben Weisman	Steve Sholes	1:37
25.	"She's Not You" (Remastered)	Jerry Leiber; Mike Stoller; Doc Pomus	Steve Sholes; Chet Atkins	2:09
26.	"Just Tell Her Jim Said Hello"	Jerry Leiber and Mike Stoller	Steve Sholes	1:53
27.	"King Of The Whole Wide World"	Bob Roberts; Ruth Bachelor	Steve Sholes	2:41
28.	"Return To Sender"	Winfield Scott; Otis Blackwell	Steve Sholes; Chet Atkins	2:09

CD 4: Viva Las Vegas 1963-1968
No.	Title	Writer(s)	Producer(s)	Length
1.	"(You're The) Devil In Disguise"	Bill Giant; Bernie Baum; Florence Kaye	Steve Sholes	2:20
2.	"One Broken Heart For Sale"	Otis Blackwell; Winfield Scott	Leith Stevens	1:46
3.	"Bossa Nova Baby" (Remastered)	Jerry Leiber and Mike Stoller	Steve Sholes	2:06
4.	"Witchcraft"	Dave Bartholomew; Pearl King	Steve Sholes	2:22
5.	"They Remind Me Too Much Of You"	Don Robertson	Leith Stevens	2:30
6.	"Kiss Me Quick"	Doc Pomus; Mort Shuman	Steve Sholes	2:46
7.	"Viva Las Vegas" (Remastered)	Doc Pomus; Mort Shuman	George Stoll	2:26
8.	"Kissin' Cousins"	Fred Wise; Randy Starr	Steve Sholes	2:12
9.	"What'd I Say"	Ray Charles	George Stoll	3:02
10.	"Such A Night"	Lincoln Chase	Steve Sholes; Chet Atkins	2:59
11.	"Ain't That Loving You Baby"	Clyde Otis; Ivory Joe Hunter	Steve Sholes	1:48
12.	"Blue Christmas"	Billy Hayes; Jay W. Johnson	Steve Sholes	2:07
13.	"Do The Clam"	Dolores Fuller; Sid Wayne; Ben Weisman	George Stoll	3:20
14.	"Crying In The Chapel"	Darrell Glenn	Steve Sholes	2:23
15.	"Big Boss Man"	Luther Dixon; Al Smith	Steve Sholes	2:51
16.	"(Such An) Easy Question"	Otis Blackwell; Winfield Scott	Steve Sholes	2:19
17.	"Frankie and Johnny"	Alex Gottlieb; Ben Weisman; Frederick Karger	Steve Sholes	2:33
18.	"Love Letters"	Edward Heyman; Victor Young	Steve Sholes	2:50
19.	"Guitar Man"	Jerry Reed	Steve Sholes	2:15
20.	"U.S. Male"	Jerry Reed	Steve Sholes	2:42
21.	"You'll Never Walk Alone"	Rodgers and Hammerstein	Steve Sholes	2:42
22.	"If I Can Dream" (Stereo Mix)	Walter Earl Brown	Steve Sholes	3:10

CD 5: Always On My Mind 1969-2003
No.	Title	Writer(s)	Producer(s)	Length
1.	"In the Ghetto"	Mac Davis	Chips Moman	2:56
2.	"Suspicious Minds"	Mark James	Chips Moman; Felton Jarvis	4:31
3.	"The Wonder Of You" (Live)	Baker Knight	Steve Sholes	2:26
4.	"You Don't Have to Say You Love Me" (Remastered)	Vicki Wickham; Simon Napier-Bell; Pino Donaggio; Vito Pallavicini	Felton Jarvis	2:30
5.	"I Just Can't Help Believing" (Live)	Barry Mann; Cynthia Weil	Felton Jarvis	4:34
6.	"I'm Leavin'"	Sonny Charles; Michael Jarrett	Steve Sholes	3:50
7.	"Until It's Time for You to Go" (Live)	Buffy Sainte-Marie	Steve Sholes	3:56
8.	"An American Trilogy" (New Sound Remastered)	Mickey Newbury	Steve Sholes	4:38
9.	"Burning Love"	Dennis Linde	Felton Jarvis	2:56
10.	"Always On My Mind" (Remastered)	Wayne Carson; Johnny Christopher; Mark James	Felton Jarvis	3:37
11.	"Fool"	Carl Sigman; James Last	Steve Sholes	2:41
12.	"Promised Land" (New Sound Remastered)	Chuck Berry	Felton Jarvis	2:57
13.	"My Boy"	Phil Coulter; Bill Martin; Jean-Pierre Bourtayre; Claude François	Felton Jarvis	3:19
14.	"T-R-O-U-B-L-E"	Jerry Chesnut	Felton Jarvis	3:03
15.	"Hurt"	Jimmie Crane; Al Jacobs	Felton Jarvis	2:07
16.	"The Girl Of My Best Friend"	Beverly Ross; Sam Bobrick	Steve Sholes; Chet Atkins	2:21
17.	"Moody Blue"	Mark James	Felton Jarvis	2:48
18.	"She Thinks I Still Care"	Dickey Lee; Steve Duffy	Felton Jarvis	3:46
19.	"Suspicion"	Doc Pomus; Mort Shuman	Felton Jarvis	2:34
20.	"Way Down"	Layng Martine Jr.	Felton Jarvis	2:36
21.	"My Way" (Live)	Paul Anka; Claude François	Felton Jarvis	4:00
22.	"A Little Less Conversation" (JXL Remix Radio Edit)	Mac Davis; Billy Strange	JXL; Ad Bradley	3:31
23.	"Rubberneckin'" (Paul Oakenfold Remix Radio Edit)	Dory Jones; Bunny Warren	Paul Oakenfold	3:29
Total length:				4:55:00

== Formats ==
- CD Europe Standard edition – 5-disc edition containing 115 songs, including a 28-page booklet, containing 16 pictures of Elvis, and liner notes about Elvis' life.
- CD Germany Standard edition – 5-disc edition containing 115 songs, including a 28-page booklet, containing 14 pictures of Elvis, and liner notes about Elvis' life.
- CD Europe and Australia 2006 edition – 4-disc edition release, containing 93 songs, including a 24-page booklet, containing 16 pictures of Elvis, and liner notes about Elvis' life.
- Digital download Europe – European digital edition, containing the same 94 songs from the European and Australian CD edition, but with a different track order.
- Digital download South America – South American digital edition, containing the same 115 songs from the European 5-CD edition, but with a slightly different track order.

== Personnel ==
Credits adapted from the album's liner notes.

=== Production ===
- Compilation – Richard Dinnadge
- Compilation (With Thanks To) – Henri Heymans, Meir Malinsky, Roger Menz, Roger Semon, Stuart Rubin
- Repertoire Administration – Daniel Sankey

=== Design ===
- Design – Green Ink
- Liner Notes – Colin Escott
- Liner Notes Edited By – Richard Lutterloch
- Production and Print – Claudette Bramble
