= Hitstory =

Compilation album by Elvis Presley
- Released: October 11, 2005
- Recorded: July 5, 1954–October 29, 1976
- Genre: Rock and roll, pop, country, gospel
- Length: 3:27:00
- Label: RCA

Elvis Presley chronology
2nd to None (2003)	Hitstory (2005)	Elvis Inspirational (2006)

Professional ratings
Review scores
Source	Rating
Allmusic	4.5/5 stars

Hitstory is compilation album by American singer and musician Elvis Presley, which includes the two previous compilation album ELV1S and 2nd to None, in addition to a bonus disc, entitled The Story Continues. "My Way" in the European edition is an alternative 'live' 1977 version to the single. On March 8, 2018, the box set was certified Platinum by the RIAA for sales in excess of 333,333 units.

The tracks are not in any chronological order, but still derive from Presley's whole recording career.

== Track listing ==
=== Disc 1 ===
1. "Heartbreak Hotel"
2. "Don't Be Cruel"
3. "Hound Dog"
4. "Love Me Tender"
5. "Too Much"
6. "All Shook Up"
7. "(Let Me Be Your) Teddy Bear"
8. "Jailhouse Rock"
9. "Don't"
10. "Hard Headed Woman"
11. "One Night"
12. "(Now & Then There's) A Fool Such as I"
13. "A Big Hunk o' Love"
14. "Stuck On You"
15. "It's Now or Never"
16. "Are You Lonesome Tonight?"
17. "Wooden Heart"
18. "Surrender"
19. "(Marie's the Name) His Latest Flame"
20. "Can't Help Falling in Love"
21. "Good Luck Charm"
22. "She's Not You"
23. "Return to Sender"
24. "(You're the) Devil in Disguise"
25. "Crying in the Chapel"
26. "In the Ghetto"
27. "Suspicious Minds"
28. "The Wonder of You"
29. "Burning Love"
30. "Way Down"
31. "A Little Less Conversation (JXL Radio Edit Remix)"

=== Disc 2 ===
1. "That's All Right"
2. "I Forgot to Remember to Forget"
3. "Blue Suede Shoes"
4. "I Want You, I Need You, I Love You"
5. "Love Me"
6. "Mean Woman Blues"
7. "Loving You"
8. "Treat Me Nice"
9. "Wear My Ring Around Your Neck"
10. "King Creole"
11. "Trouble"
12. "I Got Stung"
13. "I Need Your Love Tonight"
14. "A Mess of Blues"
15. "I Feel So Bad"
16. "Little Sister"
17. "Rock-A-Hula Baby"
18. "Bossa Nova Baby"
19. "Viva Las Vegas"
20. "If I Can Dream"
21. "Memories"
22. "Don't Cry Daddy"
23. "Kentucky Rain"
24. "You Don't Have To Say You Love Me"
25. "An American Trilogy"
26. "Always on My Mind"
27. "Promised Land"
28. "Moody Blue"
29. "I'm a Roustabout" (previously unreleased bonus track)
30. "Rubberneckin'" (Paul Oakenfold Remix) (Radio Edit)

=== Disc 3 ===
==== US edition ====
1. "I Beg of You"
2. "My Wish Came True"
3. "Ain't That Lovin' You, Baby"
4. "Fame and Fortune"
5. "I Gotta Know"
6. "Flaming Star"
7. "Follow That Dream"
8. "One Broken Heart for Sale"
9. "Kissin' Cousins"
10. "Such a Night"
11. "Ask Me"
12. "(Such an) Easy Question"
13. "I'm Yours (Single Version)"
14. "Puppet on a String"
15. "Love Letters"
16. "Separate Ways"
17. "Steamroller Blues"
18. "If You Talk in Your Sleep"
19. "My Boy"

==== European edition ====
1. "Blue Moon"
2. "Mystery Train"
3. "Rip It Up"
4. "Got A Lot O' Livin' To Do"
5. "Trying to Get to You"
6. "Lawdy Miss Clawdy"
7. "Paralyzed"
8. "Party"
9. "I'm Left, You're Right, She's Gone"
10. "The Girl of My Best Friend"
11. "Wild in the Country"
12. "One Broken Heart For Sale"
13. "Kiss Me Quick"
14. "Kissin' Cousins"
15. "Such a Night"
16. "Ain't That Loving You Baby"
17. "Tell Me Why"
18. "Frankie And Johnny"
19. "All That I Am"
20. "Guitar Man"
21. "U.S. Male"
22. "I've Lost You"
23. "There Goes My Everything"
24. "Rags to Riches"
25. "I Just Can't Help Believing
26. "Until It's Time for You to Go"
27. "My Boy"
28. "Suspicion"
29. "My Way"
30. "Are You Lonesome Tonight?" (Laughing Version)

== Charts ==
=== Weekly charts ===
Weekly chart performance
Chart (2005–2007)	Peak position
Australian Albums (ARIA)	28
Irish Albums (IRMA)	21
Scottish Albums (Official Charts)	27
Swedish Albums (Sverigetopplistan)	22
UK Albums (Official Charts)	31
US Top Country Albums (Billboard)	47

=== Year-end charts ===
Year-end chart performance
Chart (2005)	Position
Swedish Albums (Sverigetopplistan)	79
UK Albums (OCC)	117

== Certifications ==
Certifications
Region	Certification	Certified units/sales
Australia (ARIA)	Gold	35,000^{^}
Ireland (IRMA)	Platinum	15,000^{^}
United Kingdom (BPI)	Gold	100,000^{^}
United States (RIAA)	Platinum	333,333^{‡}
^{^} Shipments figures based on certification alone.^{‡} Sales+streaming figures based on certification alone.
