= The All Time Greatest Hits =

Greatest hits album by Elvis Presley
- Released: August 1987
- Genre: Rock
- Length: 1:56:14
- Label: RCA

Elvis Presley chronology
His Songs of Faith and Inspiration (1987)	The All Time Greatest Hits (1987)	The Number One Hits (1987)

Singles from The All Time Greatest Hits
- 1. "Love Me Tender" Released: August 1987 (reissue); 2. "Stuck on You" Released: January 1988 (reissue)

The All Time Greatest Hits is a 1987 compilation by Elvis Presley, initially released in August 1987 exclusively in the United Kingdom, by RCA Records. It was released in the United States under the title The Top Ten Hits with a slightly altered track list.

== Critical reception ==
Professional ratings
Review scores
Source	Rating
AllMusic (US release)	5/5 stars
The Encyclopedia of Popular Music (US release)	4/5 stars
The Encyclopedia of Popular Music (1996 release)	4/5 stars
Tom Hull - On the Web (US release)	A

In a review for the US release, senior critic Stephen Thomas Erlewine notes that "Even though this double-disc set covers a lot of ground, there's a huge amount of terrific material that isn't included on the compilation", noting that "It's the perfect way to start an Elvis collection and, for many casual fans, the only set to own."

== Track listing ==
=== All countries except US ===
Disc one
No.	Title	Length
1.	"Heartbreak Hotel"	2:10
2.	"Blue Suede Shoes"	1:59
3.	"Hound Dog"	2:17
4.	"Love Me Tender"	2:40
5.	"Too Much"	2:30
6.	"All Shook Up"	1:59
7.	"(Let Me Be Your) Teddy Bear"	1:50
8.	"Paralyzed"	2:20
9.	"Party"	1:30
10.	"Jailhouse Rock"	2:26
11.	"Don't"	2:49
12.	"Wear My Ring Around Your Neck"	2:15
13.	"Hard Headed Woman"	1:55
14.	"King Creole"	2:09
15.	"One Night"	2:32
16.	"(Now and Then There's) A Fool Such as I"	2:29
17.	"A Big Hunk o' Love"	2:06
18.	"Stuck on You"	2:15
19.	"The Girl of My Best Friend"	2:21
20.	"It's Now or Never"	3:16
21.	"Are You Lonesome Tonight?"	3:07
22.	"Wooden Heart"	2:03
23.	"Surrender"	1:51
24.	"(Marie's the Name) His Latest Flame"	2:05
25.	"Can't Help Falling in Love"	3:00
26.	"Good Luck Charm"	2:23

Disc two
No.	Title	Length
1.	"She's Not You"	2:09
2.	"Return to Sender"	2:06
3.	"(You're the) Devil in Disguise"	2:20
4.	"Crying in the Chapel"	2:26
5.	"Love Letters (song)"	2:52
6.	"If I Can Dream"	3:13
7.	"In the Ghetto"	2:43
8.	"Suspicious Minds"	3:22
9.	"Don't Cry Daddy"	2:49
10.	"The Wonder of You"	2:34
11.	"I Just Can't Help Believin'"	4:45
12.	"An American Trilogy"	4;22
13.	"Burning Love"	2:50
14.	"Always on My Mind"	3:28
15.	"My Boy"	3:10
16.	"Suspicion"	2:31
17.	"Moody Blue"	2:55
18.	"Way Down"	2:37
19.	"It's Only Love"	2:45
Total length:		1:56:14

=== US release ===
Disc one
No.	Title	Length
1.	"Heartbreak Hotel"	2:08
2.	"I Want You, I Need You, I Love You"	2:37
3.	"Hound Dog"	2:14
4.	"Don't Be Cruel"	2:02
5.	"Love Me Tender"	2:44
6.	"Love Me"	2:42
7.	"Too Much"	2:31
8.	"All Shook Up"	1:57
9.	"(Let Me Be Your) Teddy Bear"	1:48
10.	"Jailhouse Rock"	2:28
11.	"Don't"	2:48
12.	"I Beg of You"	1:52
13.	"Wear My Ring Around Your Neck"	2:14
14.	"Hard Headed Woman"	1:53
15.	"One Night"	2:32
16.	"I Got Stung"	1:49
17.	"(Now and Then There's) A Fool Such as I"	2:29
18.	"I Need Your Love Tonight"	2:03
19.	"A Big Hunk O' Love"	2:16

Disc two
No.	Title	Length
1.	"Stuck on You"	2:16
2.	"It's Now or Never"	2:35
3.	"Are You Lonesome Tonight"	3:05
4.	"Surrender"	1:51
5.	"I Feel So Bad"	2:51
6.	"Little Sister"	2:31
7.	"(Marie's the Name) His Latest Flame"	2:15
8.	"Can't Help Falling in Love"	3:01
9.	"Good Luck Charm"	2:24
10.	"She's Not You"	2:08
11.	"Return to Sender"	2:09
12.	"(You're The) Devil in Disguise"	2:18
13.	"Bossa Nova Baby"	2:01
14.	"Crying in the Chapel"	2:23
15.	"In the Ghetto"	2:45
16.	"Suspicious Minds"	3:24
17.	"Don't Cry Daddy"	2:50
18.	"The Wonder of You"	2:37
19.	"Burning Love"	2:57
Total length:		1:32:16

== Charts ==
=== The All Time Greatest Hits ===
Chart (1987–1991)	Peak position
Australian Albums (ARIA)	7
New Zealand Albums (RMNZ)	12
UK Albums (Official Charts)	4

=== The Top Ten Hits ===
Chart (1987)	Peak position
US Billboard 200	117

== Certifications and sales ==
=== The All Time Greatest Hits ===
Region	Certification	Certified units/sales
Australia (ARIA)	2× Platinum	140,000^{^}
New Zealand (RMNZ)	Platinum	15,000^{^}
Spain (Promusicae)	Platinum	100,000^{^}
United Kingdom (BPI)	Gold	100,000^{^}
^{*} Sales figures based on certification alone.^{^} Shipments figures based on certification alone.

=== The Top Ten Hits ===
Region	Certification	Certified units/sales
United States (RIAA)	4× Platinum	4,000,000^{^}
^{*} Sales figures based on certification alone.^{^} Shipments figures based on certification alone.
