= Worldwide 50 Gold Award Hits Vol. 1 =

Compilation album by Elvis Presley
- Released: August 1970
- Genre: Rock
- Label: RCA Victor

Elvis Presley chronology
On Stage: February 1970 (1970)	Worldwide 50 Gold Award Hits Vol. 1 (1970)	Almost in Love (1970)

Worldwide 50 Gold Award Hits Vol. 1 is a compilation box set by American singer and musician Elvis Presley. The four-record set was released in August 1970, as his 38th album. The set peaked at number 45 on the Billboard Top LPs chart and number 25 on the country albums chart. It was certified Gold on February 13, 1973, Platinum on March 27, 1992, and 2× Platinum on June 17, 1992, by the Recording Industry Association of America. Of the 51 tracks featured, four make their album debut in this collection: "Viva Las Vegas", "Suspicious Minds", "Don't Cry Daddy", and "Kentucky Rain". Also included is an excerpt from the long out-of-print spoken-word EP, Elvis Sails.

All tracks in this box set are in mono.

== Track listing ==
Side one
No.	Title	Writer(s)	Recording date	Length
1.	"Heartbreak Hotel"	Mae Boren Axton, Tommy Durden, Elvis Presley	January 10, 1956	2:01
2.	"I Was the One"	Aaron Schroeder, Claude Demetrius, Hal Blair, Bill Peppers	January 11, 1956	2:33
3.	"I Want You I Need You I Love You"	Maurice Mysels, Ira Kosloff	April 14, 1956	2:39
4.	"Don't Be Cruel"	Otis Blackwell, Elvis Presley	July 2, 1956	2:03
5.	"Hound Dog"	Jerry Leiber, Mike Stoller	July 2, 1956	2:15
6.	"Love Me Tender" (from Love Me Tender)	Vera Matson, Elvis Presley	August 24, 1956	2:45

Side two
No.	Title	Writer(s)	Recording date	Length
1.	"Any Way You Want Me"	Aaron Schroeder, Cliff Owens	July 2, 1956	2:15
2.	"Too Much"	Lee Rosenberg, Bernard Weinman	September 2, 1956	2:32
3.	"Playing for Keeps"	Stanley Kesler	September 1, 1956	2:48
4.	"All Shook Up"	Otis Blackwell, Elvis Presley	January 12, 1957	1:58
5.	"That's When Your Heartaches Begin"	William Raskin, George Brown, Fred Fisher	January 13, 1957	3:25
6.	"Loving You" (from Loving You)	Jerry Leiber, Mike Stoller	February 24, 1957	2:15

Side three
No.	Title	Writer(s)	Recording date	Length
1.	"(Let Me Be Your) Teddy Bear" (from Loving You)	Kal Mann, Bernie Lowe	January 15–18, 1957	1:53
2.	"Jailhouse Rock" (from Jailhouse Rock)	Jerry Leiber, Mike Stoller	April 30, 1957	2:30
3.	"Treat Me Nice" (from Jailhouse Rock)	Jerry Leiber, Mike Stoller	September 5, 1957	2:12
4.	"I Beg of You"	Rose Marie McCoy, Kelly Owens	February 23, 1957	1:53
5.	"Don't"	Jerry Leiber, Mike Stoller	September 6, 1957	2:48
6.	"Wear My Ring Around Your Neck"	Bert Carroll, Russell Moody	February 1, 1958	2:15
7.	"Hard Headed Woman" (from King Creole)	Claude Demetrius	January 15, 1958	1:53

Side four
No.	Title	Writer(s)	Recording date	Length
1.	"I Got Stung"	Aaron Schroeder, David Hill	June 10, 1958	1:50
2.	"A Fool Such As I"	Bill Trader, Bob Miller	June 10, 1958	2:36
3.	"A Big Hunk o' Love"	Aaron Schroeder, Sid Wyche	June 10, 1958	2:12
4.	"Stuck on You"	Aaron Schroeder, J. Leslie McFarland	March 20, 1960	2:16
5.	"A Mess of Blues"	Doc Pomus, Mort Shuman	March 20, 1960	2:41
6.	"It's Now or Never"	Aaron Schroeder, Wally Gold	April 3, 1960	3:25

Side five
No.	Title	Writer(s)	Recording date	Length
1.	"I Gotta Know"	Paul Evans, Matt Williams	April 3, 1960	2:14
2.	"Are You Lonesome Tonight?"	Roy Turk, Lou Handman	April 3, 1960	3:05
3.	"Surrender"	Doc Pomus, Mort Shuman	October 30, 1960	1:51
4.	"I Feel So Bad"	Chuck Willis	March 12, 1961	2:54
5.	"Little Sister"	Doc Pomus, Mort Shuman	June 25, 1961	2:29
6.	"Can't Help Falling in Love" (from Blue Hawaii)	Hugo Peretti, Luigi Creatore, George Weiss	March 23, 1961	3:01

Side six
No.	Title	Writer(s)	Recording date	Length
1.	"Rock-A-Hula Baby" (from Blue Hawaii)	Fred Wise, Ben Weisman, Dolores Fuller	March 23, 1961	2:24
2.	"Anything That's Part of You"	Don Robertson	October 15, 1961	1:57
3.	"Good Luck Charm"	Aaron Schroeder, Wally Gold	October 15, 1961	2:24
4.	"She's Not You"	Doc Pomus, Mike Stoller, Jerry Leiber	March 19, 1962	2:03
5.	"Return to Sender" (from Girls! Girls! Girls!)	Otis Blackwell, Winfield Scott	March 27, 1962	2:05
6.	"Where Do You Come from" (from Girls! Girls! Girls!)	Ruth Batchelor, Bob Roberts	March 27, 1962	2:08
7.	"One Broken Heart for Sale" (from It Happened at the World's Fair)	Otis Blackwell, Winfield Scott	September 22, 1962	2:09

Side seven
No.	Title	Writer(s)	Recording date	Length
1.	"(You're the) Devil in Disguise"	Bill Giant, Bernie Baum, Florence Kaye	May 26, 1963	2:01
2.	"Bossa Nova Baby" (from Fun in Acapulco)	Jerry Leiber, Mike Stoller	January 22, 1963	1:35
3.	"Kissin' Cousins" (from Kissin' Cousins)	Fred Wise, Randy Starr	September 30-October 10, 1963	2:18
4.	"Viva Las Vegas" (from Viva Las Vegas)	Doc Pomus, Mort Shuman	July 9, 1963	2:11
5.	"Ain't That Loving You Baby"	Clyde Otis, Ivory Joe Hunter	June 10, 1958	2:22
6.	"Wooden Heart" (from G.I. Blues)	Fred Wise, Ben Weisman, Kay Twomey	April 28, 1960	2:02

Side eight
No.	Title	Writer(s)	Recording date	Length
1.	"Crying in the Chapel"	Artie Glenn	October 30, 1960	2:23
2.	"If I Can Dream"	Walter Earl Brown	June 23, 1968	2:12
3.	"In the Ghetto"	Mac Davis	January 20, 1969	2:48
4.	"Suspicious Minds"	Mark James	January 22, 1969	4:27
5.	"Don't Cry Daddy"	Mac Davis	January 15, 1969	3:09
6.	"Kentucky Rain"	Eddie Rabbitt, Dick Heard	February 20, 1969	3:15
7.	"'Elvis Sails" (excerpts)	—	September 22, 1958	2:44

== Charts ==
1970 chart performance for Worldwide 50 Gold Award Hits Vol. 1
Chart (1970)	Peak position
UK Albums (Official Charts)	49

2010 chart performance for Worldwide 50 Gold Award Hits Vol. 1
Chart (2010)	Peak position
US Billboard 200	45
US Top Country Albums (Billboard)	25

2022 chart performance for Worldwide 50 Gold Award Hits Vol. 1
Chart (2022)	Peak position
German Albums (Offizielle Top 100)	72

== Certifications ==
Region	Certification	Certified units/sales
United States (RIAA)	2× Platinum	2,000,000^{^}
^{^} Shipments figures based on certification alone.
