= 50,000,000 Elvis Fans Can't Be Wrong: Elvis' Gold Records, Volume 2 =

Elvis' Gold Records, Vol. 2

Greatest hits album by Elvis Presley
- Released: November 13, 1959
- Recorded: February 1957 – June 1958
- Genres: Rock and roll, pop
- Length: 22:00
- Label: RCA Victor
- Producer: Steve Sholes

Elvis Presley chronology
A Date with Elvis (1959)	Elvis' Gold Records, Vol. 2 (1959)	Elvis Is Back! (1960)

Singles from 50,000,000 Elvis Fans Can't Be Wrong: Elvis' Golden Records, Vol. 2
- 1. "Don't" Released: January 7, 1958; 2. "Wear My Ring Around Your Neck" Released: April 1, 1958; 3. "One Night" Released: October 21, 1958; 4. "(Now and Then There's) A Fool Such as I" Released: March 10, 1959; 5. "A Big Hunk o' Love" Released: June 23, 1959

Professional ratings
Review scores
Source	Rating
AllMusic	link
Encyclopedia of Popular Music	5/5 stars

50,000,000 Elvis Fans Can't Be Wrong: Elvis' Gold Records, Volume 2 (or simply known as Elvis' Gold Records, Volume 2) is the fourth compilation album by American singer and musician Elvis Presley, issued by RCA Victor in November 1959. It is a compilation of hit singles released in 1958 and 1959 by Presley, from recording sessions going back as far as February 1957.

Elvis' Gold Records, Vol. 2 peaked at number 31 on the Billboard Top Pop Albums chart. It was certified by the Recording Industry Association of America (RIAA) for a Gold Record Award (based on $1,000,000 in wholesale sales) on November 1, 1966. It was certified for a Platinum Record Award for sales of one million copies in the US on March 27, 1992.

== Title ==
There has long been confusion over the official title of this album. The title is shown on the original record's labels as Elvis' Gold Records, Vol. 2, with a comma and an abbreviation of "Volume", but on the jacket, it appears as Elvis' Gold Records – Volume 2. The phrase "50,000,000 Elvis Fans Can't Be Wrong" does not appear on the labels on any of the original records, and it is the title of the records on the labels—not the jacket—that is usually given preference when conflicting titles appear on albums. Therefore, the phrase was not part of the original title of the album. Beginning no later than 1962, RCA Victor added "50,000,000 Elvis Fans Can't Be Wrong" to the labels of a few mono records and to the then newly released "electronically reprocessed stereo" records. The boasting on the label appears nearly exclusive to records manufactured at RCA Victor's Hollywood pressing plant; copies pressed at the other plants tended to use the proper title only. The "50,000,000" phrase remained there for several years, but by 1968, it was removed from the new orange RCA Victor labels and was not found on any record labels for years afterward. The phrase was added again to the first compact disc releases of this album in 1984, where it has remained.

== Content ==
Elvis' Gold Records, Vol. 2 consists of both sides of five singles released during 1958 and 1959. Two sides made number 1 on the Billboard Hot 100, and six others reached the Top 10. In the 1950s, a Gold Record awarded to a single required certified sales of one million copies in the United States. This is different from the definition in use since the 1990s, when a Gold Record for a single was reduced to sales of 500,000 units.

== Reissues ==
RCA first reissued the original 10 track album on compact disc in 1984; this issue, in reprocessed (fake) stereo sound was quickly withdrawn and the disc was reissued in original monophonic. In 1997, RCA reissued the album again in a 20 track expanded CD edition, adding one A-side ("Hard Headed Woman") and one B-side ("Playing For Keeps"), along with tracks from top-selling EPs (e.g., "Peace In The Valley"). Several of those EP tracks were hit singles in other countries, notably the UK (i.e., "Santa Bring My Baby Back To Me"). The bonus tracks are interspersed within the original tracks, with the original running order of the album substantially altered. In 2005, RCA once again reissued the original 10 track album on CD with the correct running order.

The unified Billboard Hot 100 singles chart was not created until August, 1958. Chart positions for records (below) prior to this date were taken from the magazine's "Best Sellers in Stores" chart. In some cases, the early measurement of success of rock and roll records also came from the "Most Played on Jukeboxes" chart. Chart positions (below) for the bonus tracks on the CDs were taken from the peak position that the EP album achieved on Billboard's then extant EP chart (1957–60).

== Legacy ==
The famous cover photo, of multiple images of Elvis wearing the gold lamé suit designed by Nudie's of Hollywood, has been copied many times. Album covers so inspired include:

- Phil Ochs' Greatest Hits album of 1970; not a "greatest hits" album at all but consisting of new original material, subtitled on the back cover "50 Phil Ochs Fans Can't Be Wrong!"
- The 1983 album by Rod Stewart, Body Wishes;
- The Elvis Costello & The Attractions bootleg album of the same name from the 1980s.
- Blues Traveler's more modest 1,000,000 People Can't Be Wrong of 1994.
- Blumfeld's second studio album L'Etat Et Moi from 1995.
- The Fall's compilation 50,000 Fall Fans Can't Be Wrong from 2004.
- 100,000,000 Bon Jovi Fans Can't Be Wrong, also from 2004.
- 50,000,000 Soulwax Fans Can't Be Wrong from 2005.

The meme has also been adopted to other media, such as:

- The 1982 bootleg Elvis' Greatest Shit, a compilation of tracks and out-takes that the bootlegger considered among Presley's worst recordings, is subtitled "50,000,000 Elvis Fans Can Be Wrong".
- The second album by the group Dread Zeppelin, which is fronted by an Elvis impersonator, from 1991 is titled 5,000,000 in reference to this album; the footnote says "*Tortelvis Fans Can't Be Wrong." The cover more obviously parodies Led Zeppelin's fourth album.
- The title used verbatim in the lyrics to "The Thanksgiving Song", by Adam Sandler in 1993.
- The 1997 documentary by Joe Franklin 50,000,000 Joe Franklin Fans Can't Be Wrong.
- Marilyn Manson's 1998 book The Long Hard Road Out of Hell contains a chapter entitled "Fifty Million Screaming Christians Can't Be Wrong".
- Mindless Self Indulgence's song "You'll Rebel To Anything" from their 2005 album of the same name contains the lyrics, "you're telling me that 50,000,000 screaming fans are never wrong, I'm telling you that 50,000,000 screaming fans are fucking morons".
- Die! Die! Die!'s self-titled debut features a song named "Franz (17 Die! Die! Die! Fans Can't Be Wrong)" in 2006.
- Stephan Pastis, author of comic strip Pearls Before Swine, released a collection in 2010 titled "50,000,000 Pearls Fans Can't Be Wrong."
- In 2013, the band Supersuckers released a free digital EP entitled 50,000 Middle Fingers Can't Be Wrong.
- Doc Yewll references this album while talking with T'evgin in the Defiance 3rd-season episode, The Last Unicorns.
- The Caroline Says album of the same name from 2017.

== Title meanings ==
The blurb "50,000,000 Elvis Fans Can't Be Wrong" that became an on-and-off part of the album's title originated with a one-page article titled "Can Fifty Million Americans Be Wrong" by Les Brown that appeared in the September 19, 1956, issue of Down Beat magazine. The article was an unfavorable look at Elvis and his fans, with Brown bemoaning the lack of appreciation of the "fine talents" of Jeri Southern, Dick Haymes, and "other serious vocal artists." The article concludes, "The educational responsibility seems to fall mainly on the disc jockey, who still has the greatest proximity to, and the greatest influence over, the record-buying public. Fifty million Americans can easily be misled." The article was written in response to a statement from Steve Sholes, Elvis' producer, estimating that fifty million Elvis Presley records had been sold over the course of his career up to that point. Sholes said: "Every record Elvis has ever made for us has sold over a million. Since January, 1956, we've sold 50 million Elvis Presley records in this country alone, not counting foreign sales or albums."

The expression "Fifty Million Frenchmen Can't Be Wrong," originating in a 1927 song by Willie Raskin, Billy Rose, and Fred Fisher and performed by Sophie Tucker, predated its use in Brown's article. The song prompted the creation of a popular snowclone about fifty million people being wrong. Methodist pastor J. Resler Shultz of Harrisburg, PA, used "Can fifty million Americans be wrong" as the title of a sermon in 1931. Articles with similar titles have appeared somewhat frequently since that time—some being about food, politics, or religion.

== Track listing ==
Chart positions for LPs and EPs from Billboard Top Pop Albums chart; positions for singles from Billboard Pop Singles chart

=== Original release ===
Side one
No.	Song title	Writer(s)	Recorded	Catalogue	Release date	Chart peak	Time
1.	"I Need Your Love Tonight"	Bix Reichner and Sid Wayne	June 10, 1958	47-7506b	March 10, 1959	4	2:04
2.	"Don't"	Jerry Leiber and Mike Stoller	September 6, 1957	47-7150	January 7, 1958	1	2:48
3.	"Wear My Ring Around Your Neck"	Bert Carroll and Russell Moody	February 1, 1958	47-7240	April 1, 1958	3	2:13
4.	"My Wish Came True"	Ivory Joe Hunter	September 6, 1957	47-7600b	June 23, 1959	12	2:33
5.	"I Got Stung"	David Hill and Aaron Schroeder	June 11, 1958	47-7410b	October 21, 1958	8	1:49
Side two
No.	Song title	Writer(s)	Recorded	Catalogue	Release date	Chart peak	Time
1.	"One Night"	Dave Bartholomew, Pearl King, Anita Steiman	February 23, 1957	47-7410	October 21, 1958	4	2:29
2.	"A Big Hunk o' Love"	Aaron Schroeder and Sidney Wyche	June 10, 1958	47-7600	June 23, 1959	1	2:12
3.	"I Beg of You"	Rose Marie McCoy and Cliff Owens	February 23, 1957	47-7150b	January 7, 1958	8	1:50
4.	"(Now and Then There's) A Fool Such as I"	Bill Trader	June 10, 1958	47-7506	March 10, 1959	2	2:36
5.	"Doncha' Think It's Time"	Luther Dixon and Clyde Otis	February 1, 1958	47-7240b	April 1, 1958	21	1:54

=== 1997 reissue with bonus tracks ===
No.	Song title	Writer(s)	Recorded	Catalogue	Release date	Chart peak	Time
1.	"A Big Hunk o' Love"	Aaron Schroeder and Sidney Wyche	June 10, 1958	47-7600	June 23, 1959	1	2:12
2.	"My Wish Came True"	Ivory Joe Hunter	September 6, 1957	47-7600b	June 23, 1959	12	2:33
3.	"(Now and Then There's) A Fool Such as I"	Bill Trader	June 10, 1958	47-7506	March 10, 1959	2	2:36
4.	"I Need Your Love Tonight"	Bix Reichner and Sid Wayne	June 10, 1958	47-7506b	March 10, 1959	4	2:04
5.	"Don't"	Jerry Leiber and Mike Stoller	September 6, 1957	47-7150	January 7, 1958	1	2:48
6.	"I Beg of You"	Rose Marie McCoy and Kelly Owens	February 23, 1957	47-7150b	January 7, 1958	8	1:50
7.	"Santa Bring My Baby Back (To Me)"	Aaron Schroeder and Claude Demetrius	September 7, 1957	LOC 1035	October 15, 1957	~	1:54
8.	"Santa Claus Is Back in Town"	Jerry Leiber and Mike Stoller	September 7, 1957	LOC 1035	October 15, 1957	~	2:22
9.	"Party"	Jessie Mae Robinson	January 21, 1957	LPM 1515	July 1, 1957	~	1:26
10.	"Paralyzed"	Otis Blackwell and Elvis Presley	September 2, 1956	LPM 1382	October 19, 1956	59	2:23
11.	"One Night"	Dave Bartholomew, Pearl King	February 23, 1957	47-7410	October 21, 1958	4	2:29
12.	"I Got Stung"	David Hill and Aaron Schroeder	June 11, 1958	47-7410b	October 21, 1958	8	1:49
13.	"King Creole"	Jerry Leiber and Mike Stoller	January 23, 1958	LPM 1884	September 19, 1958	~	2:08
14.	"Wear My Ring Around Your Neck"	Bert Carroll and Moody Russell	February 1, 1958	47-7240	April 1, 1958	3	2:13
15.	"Don'cha Think It's Time"	Luther Dixon and Clyde Otis	February 1, 1958	47-7240b	April 1, 1958	21	1:54
16.	"Mean Woman Blues"	Claude Demetrius	January 13, 1957	LPM 1515	July 1, 1957	~	2:15
17.	"Playing for Keeps"	Stan Kesler	September 1, 1956	47-6800b	January 4, 1957	34	2:50
18.	"Hard Headed Woman"	Claude Demetrius	January 15, 1958	47-7280	June 10, 1958	2	1:53
19.	"Got a Lot o' Livin' to Do"	Aaron Schroeder and Ben Weisman	January 12, 1957	LPM 1515	July 1, 1957	~	2:31
20.	"(There'll Be) Peace In The Valley For Me"	Thomas A. Dorsey	January 13, 1957	EPA 4054	April 1, 1957	39	3:22

=== Follow That Dream re-issue ===
Disc 1

LP Masters:
No.	Title	Length
1.	"I Need Your Love Tonight"	2:04
2.	"Don't"	2:43
3.	"Wear My Ring Around Your Neck"	2:13
4.	"My Wish Came True"	2:33
5.	"I Got Stung"	1:49
6.	"One Night"	2:32
7.	"A Big Hunk O' Love" (splice 3/4)	2:12
8.	"I Beg Of You"	1:53
9.	"(Now And Then There's) A Fool Such As I"	2:36
10.	"Doncha' Think It's Time" (splice 40/39 – LP version)	1:54

Bonus Masters:
No.	Title	Length
11.	"Your Cheatin' Heart"	2:24
12.	"Ain't That Loving You Baby"	2:22
13.	"Doncha' Think It's Time" (splice 47/40/48 - original single master)	1:54

February 1958 Session:
No.	Title	Length
14.	"Wear My Ring Around Your Neck" (undubbed)	2:13
15.	"Your Cheatin' Heart" (alternate take 9)	2:24
16.	"Doncha' Think It's Time" (take 39)	1:54
17.	"Doncha' Think It's Time" (take 40)	1:57
18.	"Doncha' Think It's Time" (take 47)	1:55
19.	"Doncha' Think It's Time" (take 48)	1:54

June 1958 Sessions:
No.	Title	Length
20.	"A Big Hunk O' Love" (take 1, pb)
21.	"A Big Hunk O' Love" (take 2, pb)
22.	"A Big Hunk O' Love" (take 3, pb)
23.	"A Big Hunk O' Love" (take 4, pb)
24.	"Ain't That Loving You Baby" (take 1, pb)
25.	"Ain't That Loving You Baby" (take 2, lfs)
26.	"Ain't That Loving You Baby" (take 3, fs)
27.	"Ain't That Loving You Baby" (take 4, m)
28.	"Ain't That Loving You Baby" (take 5, fs)
29.	"Ain't That Loving You Baby" (take 6, lfs)
30.	"Ain't That Loving You Baby" (take 7, lfs)
31.	"Ain't That Loving You Baby" (take 8, lfs)
32.	"Ain't That Loving You Baby" (take 9, lfs)
33.	"Ain't That Loving You Baby" (take 10, lfs)
34.	"Ain't That Loving You Baby" (take 11, lfs)

Disc 2

June 1958 Sessions:
No.	Title	Length
1.	"I Need Your Love Tonight" (take 1, lfs, starts with part of demo)
2.	"I Need Your Love Tonight" (take 2, fs)
3.	"I Need Your Love Tonight" (take 3, fs)
4.	"I Need Your Love Tonight" (take 4, pb)
5.	"I Need Your Love Tonight" (take 5, pb)
6.	"I Need Your Love Tonight" (take 6, incomplete)
7.	"I Need Your Love Tonight" (take 7, pb)
8.	"I Need Your Love Tonight" (take 8, incomplete)
9.	"I Need Your Love Tonight" (take 9, pb)
10.	"I Need Your Love Tonight" (take 10a, pb)
11.	"I Need Your Love Tonight" (take 10b, incomplete)
12.	"I Need Your Love Tonight" (take 11, lfs)
13.	"I Need Your Love Tonight" (take 12, fs)
14.	"I Need Your Love Tonight" (take 13, pb)
15.	"I Need Your Love Tonight" (take 14, pb)
16.	"I Need Your Love Tonight" (take 15, pb)
17.	"I Need Your Love Tonight" (take 16, lfs)
18.	"I Need Your Love Tonight" (take 17, fs)
19.	"I Need Your Love Tonight" (take 18, m)
20.	"(Now And Then There's) A Fool Such As I" (take 1, fs)
21.	"(Now And Then There's) A Fool Such As I" (take 2, fs)
22.	"(Now And Then There's) A Fool Such As I" (take 3, pb)
23.	"(Now And Then There's) A Fool Such As I" (take 4, fs)
24.	"(Now And Then There's) A Fool Such As I" (take 5, pb)
25.	"(Now And Then There's) A Fool Such As I" (take 6, fs)
26.	"(Now And Then There's) A Fool Such As I" (take 7, fs)
27.	"(Now And Then There's) A Fool Such As I" (take 8, pb)
28.	"(Now And Then There's) A Fool Such As I" (take 9, m)
29.	"I Got Stung" (take 1, lfs)
30.	"I Got Stung" (take 2, fs)
31.	"I Got Stung" (take 3, lfs)
32.	"I Got Stung" (take 4, fs)
33.	"I Got Stung" (take 5, fs)
34.	"I Got Stung" (take 6, fs)
35.	"I Got Stung" (take 7, fs)
36.	"I Got Stung" (take 8, pb)
37.	"I Got Stung" (take 9, fs)
38.	"I Got Stung" (take 10, pb)
39.	"I Got Stung" (take 11, pb)
40.	"I Got Stung" (take 12, pb)
41.	"I Got Stung" (take 13 fs, fs)
42.	"I Got Stung" (take 14, pb)
43.	"I Got Stung" (take 15, lfs)
44.	"I Got Stung" (take 16, pb)
45.	"I Got Stung" (take 17, fs)
46.	"I Got Stung" (take 18, lfs)
47.	"I Got Stung" (take 20, pb)
48.	"I Got Stung" (take 21, fs)
49.	"I Got Stung" (take 22, pb)
50.	"I Got Stung" (take 23, lfs)
51.	"I Got Stung" (take 24, m)

Elvis Sails EP:
No.	Title	Length
52.	"Press Interview With Elvis Presley" (At Brooklyn Army Terminal)	5:26
53.	"Elvis Presley's Newsreel Interview"	2:20
54.	"Pat Hernon Interviews Elvis" (In the Library of the U.S.S. Randall at Sailing)	2:15

== Chart performance ==
Chart (1959)	Peak position
US Billboard 200	31
