= Elvis: 2nd to None =

Album by Elvis Presley

- Cover to the standard edition of the album

Greatest hits album by Elvis Presley
- Released: October 7, 2003
- Recorded: July 5, 1954 – February 4, 1976
- Genres: Rock and roll; rockabilly; country
- Length: 78:39
- Label: RCA
- Producers: Ernst Mikael Jørgensen; Ray Bardani

Elvis Presley chronology
| ELV1S: 30 #1 Hits (2002) | Elvis: 2nd to None (2003) | Hitstory (2005) |

Alternative cover

Professional ratings
Review scores
| Source | Rating |
|---|---|
| AllMusic | 4/5 stars |

2nd to None (also known as ELVIIS: 2nd to None) is a collection of songs by American rock and roll musician Elvis Presley. The album was released on October 7, 2003 by RCA Records as the sequel to the previous year's highly successful ELV1S: 30 #1 Hits.

The album included Presley's #1 singles that did not appear on the previous release, other notable recordings by the artist, one previously unreleased recording ("I'm a Roustabout") and a remix of "Rubberneckin'" by Paul Oakenfold.

Although not as successful as its predecessor, 2nd to None made the top 10 in at least nine countries and received certifications in several regions.

== Production, artwork and packaging ==
2nd to None was produced by Ernst Mikael Jørgensen and Ray Bardani, with Bardani also mixing many of the songs on the collection with the assistance of Matt Snedecor. The tape transferring and mastering on the recordings were handled by Andreas Meyer and Vic Anesini, respectively.

The release's primary artwork consists of a picture of Presley's head and the number 2 against a black background. The release's art direction and design was handled by Mike Jurkovac. The artwork and design for the European release of the album was different, being very similar to ELV1S and having the art direction and design by the same person, Thomas Vasquez.

== Track listing ==
| No. | Title | Writer(s) | Length |
|---|---|---|---|
| 1. | "That's All Right" | Arthur Crudup | 1:57 |
| 2. | "I Forgot to Remember to Forget" | Charlie Feathers, Stan Kesler | 2:29 |
| 3. | "Blue Suede Shoes" | Carl Perkins | 2:00 |
| 4. | "I Want You, I Need You, I Love You" | Maurice Mysels and Ira Kosloff | 2:40 |
| 5. | "Love Me" | Jerry Leiber and Mike Stoller | 2:44 |
| 6. | "Mean Woman Blues" | Claude Demetrius | 2:16 |
| 7. | "Loving You" | Jerry Leiber and Mike Stoller | 2:16 |
| 8. | "Treat Me Nice" | Jerry Leiber and Mike Stoller | 2:12 |
| 9. | "Wear My Ring Around Your Neck" | Bert Carroll, Russell Moody | 2:15 |
| 10. | "King Creole" | Jerry Leiber and Mike Stoller | 2:09 |
| 11. | "Trouble" | Jerry Leiber and Mike Stoller | 2:18 |
| 12. | "I Got Stung" | David Hill, Aaron Schroeder | 1:51 |
| 13. | "I Need Your Love Tonight" | Bix Reichner, Sid Wayne | 2:06 |
| 14. | "A Mess of Blues" | Doc Pomus, Mort Shuman | 2:41 |
| 15. | "I Feel So Bad" | Chuck Willis | 2:55 |
| 16. | "Little Sister" | Doc Pomus, Mort Shuman | 2:32 |
| 17. | "Rock-A-Hula Baby" | Dolores Fuller, Ben Weisman, Fred Wise | 2:00 |
| 18. | "Bossa Nova Baby" | Jerry Leiber and Mike Stoller | 2:07 |
| 19. | "Viva Las Vegas" | Doc Pomus, Mort Shuman | 2:25 |
| 20. | "If I Can Dream" | Walter Earl Brown | 3:10 |
| 21. | "Memories" | Mac Davis, Billy Strange | 3:07 |
| 22. | "Don't Cry Daddy" | Mac Davis | 2:47 |
| 23. | "Kentucky Rain" | Dick Heard, Eddie Rabbitt | 3:19 |
| 24. | "You Don't Have to Say You Love Me" | Pino Donaggio, Simon Napier-Bell, Vito Pallavicini, Vicki Wickham | 2:31 |
| 25. | "An American Trilogy" | Mickey Newbury | 4:39 |
| 26. | "Always on My Mind" | Johnny Christopher, Mark James, Wayne Carson Thompson | 3:38 |
| 27. | "Promised Land" | Chuck Berry | 2:58 |
| 28. | "Moody Blue" | Mark James | 2:49 |
| 29. | "I'm a Roustabout" (previously unreleased bonus track) | Otis Blackwell, Winfield Scott | 2:11 |
| 30. | "Rubberneckin'" (Paul Oakenfold Remix - Radio Edit) | Dory Jones, Bunny Warren | 3:29 |

== Charts and certifications ==
=== Weekly charts ===
| Chart (2003) | Peak position |
|---|---|
| Argentinian Albums (CAPIF) | 1 |
| Australian Albums (ARIA) | 4 |
| Austrian Albums (Ö3 Austria) | 5 |
| Belgian Albums (Ultratop Flanders) | 21 |
| Belgian Albums (Ultratop Wallonia) | 40 |
| Canadian Albums (Billboard) | 3 |
| Danish Albums (Hitlisten) | 11 |
| Dutch Albums (Album Top 100) | 22 |
| Finnish Albums (Suomen virallinen lista) | 9 |
| French Compilations (SNEP) | 21 |
| German Albums (Offizielle Top 100) | 13 |
| Irish Albums (IRMA) | 13 |
| New Zealand Albums (RMNZ) | 16 |
| Norwegian Albums (VG-lista) | 17 |
| Polish Albums (OLiS) | 9 |
| Scottish Albums (Official Charts) | 4 |
| Swedish Albums (Sverigetopplistan) | 2 |
| Swiss Albums (Schweizer Hitparade) | 7 |
| UK Albums (Official Charts) | 4 |
| US Billboard 200 | 3 |

=== Year-end charts ===
| Chart (2003) | Position |
|---|---|
| Australian Albums (ARIA) | 91 |
| Austrian Albums (Ö3 Austria) | 52 |
| Swedish Albums (Sverigetopplistan) | 40 |
| Swiss Albums (Schweizer Hitparade) | 83 |
| UK Albums (OCC) | 90 |
| US Billboard 200 | 169 |
| Worldwide Albums (IFPI) | 44 |

=== Certifications ===
| Region | Certification | Certified units/sales |
|---|---|---|
| Australia (ARIA) | Gold | 35,000^{^} |
| Austria (IFPI Austria) | Platinum | 30,000^{*} |
| Denmark (IFPI Danmark) | Gold | 20,000^{^} |
| Finland (Musiikkituottajat) | Gold | 17,716 |
| New Zealand (RMNZ) | Gold | 7,500^{^} |
| Sweden (GLF) | Gold | 30,000^{^} |
| Switzerland (IFPI Switzerland) | Gold | 20,000^{^} |
| United Kingdom (BPI) | Gold | 100,000^{^} |
| United States (RIAA) | Platinum | 1,000,000^{^} |
^{*} Sales figures based on certification alone.^{^} Shipments figures based on certification alone.

== Promotion ==
Before Anyone Did Anything, Elvis Did Everything

Greatest hits album by Elvis Presley
- Released: 2003
- Recorded: July 5, 1954-February 4, 1976
- Genre: Rock and Roll
- Length: 25:32
- Label: BMG
- Producer: Various

Elvis Presley chronology
| ELV1S: 30 #1 Hits (2002) | Before Anyone Did Anything, Elvis Did Everything (2003) | 2nd to None (2003) |

To promote the album in the United Kingdom, a compilation album titled Before Anyone Did Anything, Elvis Did Everything was released as a free covermount album in the British newspaper Daily Mail. The album has a blue cover quite similar to that of 30 #1 Hits and the European release of 2nd to None. It features ten songs from those two albums and other releases such as the Close Up box set.

=== Track listing ===
| No. | Title | Length |
|---|---|---|
| 1. | "Heartbreak Hotel" (live track from the box set 'Close Up'. An updated sound version features on the album '30 #1 Hits' (CD sleeve notes).) | 1:55 |
| 2. | "Love Me Tender" (live track from the box set 'Close Up'. An updated sound version features on the album '30 #1 Hits' (CD sleeve notes).) | 1:42 |
| 3. | "Can't Help Falling In Love" (live track from the box set 'Close Up'. An updated sound version features on the album '30 #1 Hits' (CD sleeve notes). Note that this and the above two play gaplessly, presumably because they were recorded at the same concert.) | 1:45 |
| 4. | "Suspicious Minds" (Taken from the album '30 #1 Hits' (CD sleeve notes).) | 4:32 |
| 5. | "Love Me" (live track from the box set 'Close Up'. An updated sound version features on the album '2nd To None' (CD sleeve notes).) | 1:49 |
| 6. | "Burning Love" (Taken from the album '30 #1 Hits' (CD sleeve notes).) | 2:56 |
| 7. | "Have I Told You Lately That I Love You" (This track is an alternate take from the box set 'Close Up' (CD sleeve notes).) | 2:34 |
| 8. | "Kentucky Rain" (An updated sound version features on the album '2nd To None' (CD sleeve notes).) | 3:14 |
| 9. | "Don't Cry Daddy" (An updated sound version features on the album '2nd To None' (CD sleeve notes).) | 2:47 |
| 10. | "I Want To Be Free" (This track is an alternate take from the box set 'Close Up' (CD sleeve notes).) | 2:16 |
