= Doncha' Think It's Time =

"Doncha' Think It's Time?"

Single by Elvis Presley
- A-side: "Wear My Ring Around Your Neck"
- Released: 1958
- Recorded: 1958
- Studio: Radio Recorders, Hollywood
- Genre: Rock and roll
- Length: 1:57
- Songwriters: Clyde Otis; Luther Dixon

Elvis Presley singles chronology
"Don't" / "I Beg of You" (1958)	"Doncha' Think It's Time?" / "Wear My Ring Around Your Neck" (1958)	"Hard Headed Woman" / "Don't Ask Me Why" (1958)

"Doncha' Think It's Time?" is a song written by Clyde Otis and Luther Dixon and originally recorded by Elvis Presley.

Released as a single in 1958, with "Wear My Ring Around Your Neck" on the opposite side, the song it into the top 10 of US Billboard's Most Played R&B by Jockeys and Best Selling Pop Singles in Stores charts.

== Recording ==
Elvis Presley recorded the song on February 1, 1958, at Radio Recorders in Hollywood. He was in the midst of filming King Creole, and that hovered over the recording process. The atmosphere in the studio was strained. "Doncha' Think It's Time", in particular, took forty-eight takes to record.

The recording released as a single features Elvis' regular sidemen Scotty Moore on guitar, Bill Black on bass, and D. J. Fontana on drums. Elvis Presley plays guitar as well as sings. Tiny Timbrell is also on guitar. Dudley Brooks is on piano. Additional vocals are provided by The Jordanaires.

According to Elvis Presley's official website, the singer had "a very public spat" with Scotty Moore and Bill Black in the last year's September, and "the difficulties of the session bore witness to [his] frayed musical partnership" with the two musicians "who had been with him from the start. Whether Elvis had outgrown their contributions or it was simply a matter of business friction, this was the last session in which Bill Black would participate, and Scotty would be relegated to a subsidiary musical role in future."

== Release ==
The single was released on April 1, 1958.

== Track listing ==
7" single (RCA Victor 47-7240)
No.	Title	Writer(s)	Length
1.	"Doncha' Think It's Time"	Clyde Otis, Willie Dixon	1:57
2.	"Wear My Ring Around Your Neck"	Bert Carroll, Russell Moody	2:15
