= Don't Ask Me Why =

Don't Ask Me Why may refer to:

- "Don't Ask Me Why" (Elvis Presley song), 1958
- "Don't Ask Me Why" (Billy Joel song), 1980
- "Don't Ask Me Why" (Eurythmics song), 1989
