= Elvis' Greatest Shit =

Compilation album (bootleg) by Elvis Presley
- Released: July 1982
- Recorded: Various
- Genre: Pop
- Labels: RCA Victim; Dog Vomit
- Producer: Various

Elvis' Greatest Shit is a bootleg recording of Elvis Presley, released in July 1982. It assembles a number of studio recordings (largely from Presley's film soundtracks), live recordings, and outtakes intended to represent the worst recordings that Presley made in his career.

== Contents ==
The disc was assembled by a bootlegger known simply as "Richard", who thought some fans were overenthusiastic to the point of deification, and wanted to show that Presley, like most other artists, could not produce exclusively critically acclaimed work throughout his lengthy career. The tracks are mostly recordings from film soundtracks, along with a few outtakes of well-known songs; one is an aborted take of "Can't Help Falling in Love," in which, at the breakdown of the take, Presley exclaimed, "Aw, shiiiiiiiit!".

This "poor taste" concept did not merely extend to the album's contents but continued on the cover, which contained a photo of Presley shortly after his death, lying in a coffin. The photograph was allegedly taken by Presley's cousin and subsequently sold to the National Enquirer. The subtitle, "50,000,000 Elvis Fans Can Be Wrong", parodied the compilation album 50,000,000 Elvis Fans Can't Be Wrong, and the packaging included a reproduction of a prescription from George Nichopoulos, one of Presley's doctors.

The album's putative label was not RCA Victor, for which Presley recorded for almost his entire career, but "Dog Vomit" or "RCA Victim", and featured a parody of Nipper, the dog in the RCA Victor "His Master's Voice" logo, vomiting into a gramophone, captioned "He Makes Me Sick".

Most of the tracks are diegetic music from the following films starring Presley: (Note: See 1960–1968: focus on films.)

- 1961: Blue Hawaii
- 1962: Girls! Girls! Girls!
- 1963: Fun in Acapulco
- 1964: Roustabout
- 1965: Girl Happy
- 1966: Double Trouble; Paradise Hawaiian Style
- 1967: Clambake; Easy Come, Easy Go
- 1968: Speedway; Stay Away, Joe
- 1969: The Trouble with Girls

Of the choice of tracks, Lee Cotten, author of several Presley books, said, "Elvis would probably have approved of the song selection. It is truly Elvis' greatest shit." One critic agrees that at least five of the songs are among Presley's worst. On the occasion of Presley's 75th birthday, another suggested that recording these songs should have made Presley self-destructive.

Presley himself was known to have disliked at least two of the songs on the album. He walked out of the recording studio upon learning that he would have to sing "Old MacDonald Had a Farm" for the movie Double Trouble. At the end of the recording session for "Dominic the Impotent Bull" from Stay Away, Joe, Elvis made his producer Felton Jarvis promise never to release the song outside the film; Jarvis kept his word, and it was not made available on any record while either of the two was alive. Elvis' Greatest Shit was released after both of their deaths, and was the first time that the song was on any record. The song's official title was thus unknown to Richard. It was first officially released in 1994 on the Kissin' Cousins/Clambake/Stay Away, Joe CD soundtrack compilation, where its official title was revealed as simply "Dominick."

There have been four pressings of the album; the album covers vary in detail, as do the disks—different color, design, and words, but the audio material is the same. One version has a white cover and the photo is relegated to the interior. The bootleg vinyl album has since been reissued as a CD. Whatever the format, "It is guaranteed that this CD probably gathers dust on collector's shelves instead of being played—the content definately [sic] makes a strong statement of the 'situation songs' that Elvis had to perform."

== Track listing ==
=== Side one ===
1. "Old MacDonald Had a Farm"
2. "Ito Eats"
3. "There's No Room to Rhumba in a Sports Car"
4. "Confidence"
5. "Yoga Is as Yoga Does"
6. "Song of the Shrimp"
7. "U.S. Male"
8. "Fort Lauderdale Chamber of Commerce"
9. "Signs of the Zodiac"
10. "The Bullfighter Was a Lady"
11. "Wolf Call"
12. "Can't Help Falling in Love" (Outtake)

=== Side two ===
1. "He's Your Uncle, Not Your Dad"
2. "Scratch My Back Then I'll Scratch Yours"
3. "The Walls Have Ears"
4. "Poison Ivy League"
5. "Beach Boy Blues"
6. "Dominic the Impotent Bull"
7. "Queenie Wahine's Papaya"
8. "Do the Clambake (Medley)"
9. "Datin'"
10. "Are You Lonesome Tonight? (Live)"
11. "Well, Well, That's All Folks"

== Other works ==
Elvis' Greatest Shit does not fully encompass the 1974 spoken word album Having Fun with Elvis on Stage, which "is still widely considered to be the worst record ever officially released by a major artist," although excerpts from it appear in between songs. It should be noted, however, that neither Elvis, nor RCA Records, sanctioned release of "Having Fun...". It was originally a creation of Tom Parker on his Boxcar Records label.

"Richard" followed up Elvis' Greatest Shit with The Beatles vs. the Third Reich, containing a selection of recordings of the group's December 1962 appearance at the Star Club in Hamburg, and The Dark Side of the Moo, a compilation of rare or unreleased tracks by Pink Floyd, before exiting the bootleg industry.
