= Caroline Says =

American singer-songwriter

- Born: Caroline Sallee; 1989 or 1990
- Genres: Dream pop, folk, indie folk, surf-pop, psych-folk
- Years active: 2014–present

Caroline Sallee (born 1989 or 1990), better known by the stage name Caroline Says, is an American singer-songwriter. She has released three albums: 50,000,000 Million Elvis Fans Can’t Be Wrong (2014), No Fool Like an Old Fool (2018), and The Lucky One (2024).

== Background ==
Originally from Huntsville, Alabama, Sallee moved to Austin, Texas in 2013. Caroline Says is named after the Lou Reed song of the same name, which appeared on his album Berlin. Her music has been compared to that of Alvvays, Beach House, Molly Burch, Lucy Dacus, The Drums, Grizzly Bear, Mazzy Star, Real Estate, Faye Webster and Yo La Tengo. She has cited Animal Collective, The Beach Boys, Bon Iver, Bruce Springsteen and Steely Dan as influences.

== 50,000,000 Million Elvis Fans Can't Be Wrong (2014) ==
Sallee's debut album 50,000,000 Million Elvis Fans Can't Be Wrong, named after Elvis Presley's compilation album 50,000,000 Elvis Fans Can't Be Wrong: Elvis' Gold Records, Volume 2 (1959), was released in 2014, shortly after she moved to Austin, and reissued in 2017.

Will Hermes, writing in Rolling Stone, noted the album's "lovelorn wistfulness" and described it as "a warm swarm of multi-tracked vocals and simple melodies". AllMusic's Tim Sendra described the album as "a fully realized and impressive debut that shows Sallee is both a songwriting and recording prodigy of sorts, but also a very inventive vocalist." Writing for Pitchfork, Philip Cosores noted that "Sallee packs numerous songwriting and recording styles into the collection" and identified "Lost Feeling" as "the record’s best and most Lou Reed-sounding song".

== No Fool Like an Old Fool (2018) ==
No Fool Like an Old Fool, Sallee's second album, was released in 2018.

Jillian Mapes of Pitchfork described No Fool Like an Old Fool as "an album that sounds familiar but feels new in its specific way of manifesting dread" and praised "Sweet Home Alabama" as a "perfectly balanced" standout. Austin Brown of Flood Magazine described the album as "less wistful and more jaded" than its predecessor and praised "I Tried" as the song in which "Caroline Says thrives best—thinking, even dreaming about the future, but bracing oneself for the reality that it never quite turns out like you hope it will." Andrew Gordon of The Skinny also compared it to 50,000,000 Million Elvis Fans Can't Be Wrong, noting that it "retreats further into the shadows, an even quieter and more withdrawn affair" than the earlier album, and wrote that "Sallee’s songs tend to expand outwards, the feeling established at the outset spreading itself thinner as the loops cover more area." The Line of Best Fit's Ian King identified "I Tried" as evidence that while "the assumption with hushed solo songwriters is often that their lyrical themes are dominated by introspection, ... Sallee makes a point to step outside of her own perspective from time to time and try to occupy a different mindset from her own" and noted that "modest means and humble ends shape the character of No Fool Like An Old Fool." Marcy Donelson of AllMusic wrote that "'No Fool Like an Old Fool curbs some of the brightest moments of [Sallee's] debut, inhabiting a warm breeze, daydreams, and lingering regret", and concluded that "the album is at once rich, restrained, and beguiling." Reviewing the album for The Austin Chronicle, Libby Webster wrote that Salle's vocals "never reach above a mumble, but a sleepy desperation quavers throughout her songs."

== Ohio River (2019) ==
The Ohio River EP was released in 2019. Reviewing the EP for Pitchfork, Abby Jones described it as a meditation on mortality and the transitory quality of life, and suggested that, "if [No Fool Like an Old Fool] was a starting point, then Ohio River lies somewhere along the journey to Sallee’s next destination."

In June 2020 Sallee released a cover of Spacemen 3's "So Hot (Wash Away All of My Tears)" as a fundraiser for the NAACP Legal Defense and Educational Fund.

== The Lucky One (2024) ==
Sallee's third album, The Lucky One, was released in October 2024. The singles "Faded and Golden", "Roses" and "Dust" were released before the album release. In a 2024 interview, Sallee had the album had been influenced by the experience of the COVID-19 pandemic and that her motivation had been "celebrating people who aren’t typically celebrated and treasuring what is usually discarded."

Kelly Scanlon of Far Out wrote that "The Lucky One ... lives up to all expectations, adorned with Sallee’s signature vulnerability but with the bonus of clarity", and identified the relationship between memory and emotion as the album's major theme. Praising the album in Clash, Narzra Ahmed described the album as an exploration of "life and death and everything in between," with a focus on "how our pasts can continue to affect us."
