= Don't Ask Me Why (Elvis Presley song) =

Single by Elvis Presley

from the album King Creole
- A-side: "Hard Headed Woman"
- Released: June 10, 1958
- Recorded: January 16, 1958
- Genre: Rock and roll
- Length: 2:07
- Label: RCA Victor
- Composer: Ben Weisman
- Lyricist: Fred Wise

Elvis Presley singles chronology
| "Wear My Ring Around Your Neck" / "Doncha' Think It's Time" (1958) | "Hard Headed Woman" / "Don't Ask Me Why'" (1958) | "One Night" (1958) |

"Don't Ask Me Why" is a song first recorded by Elvis Presley as part of the soundtrack for his 1958 motion picture King Creole.

It was written by Fred Wise (lyrics) and Ben Weisman (music).

In 1958 the song was released on a single as a flipside to "Hard Headed Woman", another song from the same movie. In the United States "Don't Ask Me Why" peaked at number 25 on the Billboard Hot 100, while "Hard Headed Woman" was number 1 for two weeks.

The single "Hard Headed Woman / Don't Ask Me Why" was among the most popular singles of the whole year 1958 in the United States: Billboard ranked it number 49 on the year-end Popular chart (a recapitulation of the Billboard's Pop Singles chart for the year) and number 17 on the year-end Country and Western chart (a recapitulation of the Billboard's C&W chart). The single was certified Planinum by the RIAA.

== Charts ==
| Chart (1958) | Peak position |
|---|---|
| US Billboard R&B | 9 |
| US Billboard Hot 100 | 34 |

=== Year-end charts (single "Heard Headed Woman / Don't Ask Me Why") ===
| Chart (1958) | Peak position |
|---|---|
| US Billboard Popular | 49 |
| US Billboard Country and Western | 17 |

== Cover versions ==
- Wanda Jackson covered this song on her 1962 album Wonderful Wanda.
