= Any Way You Want Me (Elvis Presley song) =

Single by Elvis Presley
- A-side: "Love Me Tender"
- Released: 1956
- Recorded: July 2, 1956
- Studio: RCA Studios, New York
- Length: 2:12
- Label: RCA Victor
- Songwriters: Aaron Schroeder; Clyde Otis

Elvis Presley singles chronology
| "Shake, Rattle and Roll" / "Lawdy Miss Clawdy" (1956) | "Love Me Tender" / "Any Way You Want Me" (1956) | "Too Much" / "Playing for Keeps" (1957) |

"Any Way You Want Me" (sometimes titled "Anyway You Want Me" and "Any Way You Want Me (That's How I Will Be)") is a song co-written for Elvis by Aaron Schroeder and songwriter and musician Clyde Otis. Presley's recording reached number one on the U.S. Billboard's Most Played in Jukeboxes chart (as a double A-side with "Love Me Tender").

== Composition ==
The song was written by Aaron Schroeder and Clyde Otis.

== Recording ==
Elvis Presley recorded the song on July 2, 1956, at RCA Studios in New York. According to the Elvis Presley official website, the recording features Elvis' regular sidemen Scotty Moore on guitar, Bill Black on bass, and D. J. Fontana on drums. Presley plays guitar as well as sings. Shorty Long is on piano. Additional vocals are provided by the Jordanaires.

== Track listing ==
7" single (RCA Victor 47-6643, 1956)
| No. | Title | Writer(s) | Length |
|---|---|---|---|
| 1. | "Love Me Tender" | Elvis Presley, Vera Matson |
| 2. | "Any Way You Want Me (That's How I Will Be)" | Aaron Schroeder, Cliff Owens | 2:12 |

EP (RCA Victor EPA-065; September 21, 1956)
| No. | Title | Writer(s) | Length |
|---|---|---|---|
| 1. | "Any Way You Want Me (That's How I Will Be)" | Aaron Schroeder, Cliff Owens |
| 2. | "I'm Left, You're Right, She's Gone" | Stan Kesler, Bill Taylor |
| 3. | "I Don't Care If The Sun Don't Shine" | Mack David |
| 4. | "Mystery Train" | Junior Parker, Sam Phillips |

== Charts ==
| Chart (1956) | Peak position |
|---|---|
| US Billboard Most Played in Jukeboxes | 1 |
