= (Marie's the Name) His Latest Flame =

Single by Elvis Presley
- B-side: "Little Sister"
- Released: August 8, 1961
- Recorded: June 25, 1961
- Studio: RCA Studio B, Nashville
- Genre: Rock
- Length: 2:07
- Label: RCA Victor
- Songwriters: Doc Pomus, Mort Shuman

Elvis Presley singles chronology
"Wild in the Country" / "I Feel So Bad" (1961)	"(Marie's the Name) His Latest Flame" / "Little Sister" (1961)	"Rock-A-Hula Baby" / "Can't Help Falling in Love" (1961)

Music video
- "(Marie's the Name) His Latest Flame" (audio) on YouTube

"(Marie's the Name) His Latest Flame" is a song recorded in a hit version by Elvis Presley and published by Elvis Presley Music in 1961. It was written by Doc Pomus and Mort Shuman and first recorded by Del Shannon on the album Runaway with Del Shannon, which was released in June 1961.

== Elvis Presley recording ==
The more successful recording is by Elvis Presley and was released in August 1961. The tune, featuring a Bo Diddley beat, performed well on both pop and easy listening stations, reaching No. 4 on the Billboard Hot 100, and No. 2 on the Easy Listening chart, based (at the time) on the Top 100. However, the single's Hot 100 chart run was atypical of a Top Ten hit. In the fall of 1961, it shot from 22 to 4, then dropped to 10, then 26, all within the space of four weeks. The single (a double A-side with "Little Sister", as in the States) spent four weeks at No. 1 on the UK Singles Chart – one of Presley's nine UK chart-toppers between 1960 and 1962.

== Other versions ==
The Smiths released a medley of the song with "Rusholme Ruffians" (from the album Meat Is Murder) as a live track on the 1988 album Rank, often seen as one of the highlights of the album. R. Stevie Moore also recorded the song in 1978.

== Personnel ==
Recorded in RCA Studio B, Nashville, Tennessee, June 26, 1961

- Scotty Moore, Neal Matthews Jr. – guitars
- Bob Moore – double bass
- Hank Garland – bass guitar
- D. J. Fontana, Buddy Harman – drums, percussion
- Floyd Cramer, Gordon Stoker – piano
- Boots Randolph – claves

== Certifications ==
Region	Certification	Certified units/sales
United Kingdom (BPI)	Silver	200,000^{‡}
^{‡} Sales+streaming figures based on certification alone.
