= I Got Stung =

Single by Elvis Presley
- A-side: "One Night"
- Released: October 21, 1958
- Recorded: June 11, 1958, RCA Studios, Nashville, Tennessee
- Genre: Rock and roll
- Length: 1:51
- Label: RCA
- Songwriter(s): Aaron Schroeder, David Hill
- Producer(s): Steve Sholes: 1. 8 (US Billboard Hot 100); 2. 1 (UK Single Chart)

Elvis Presley singles chronology
"Hard Headed Woman" (1958)	"I Got Stung" (1958)	"(Now And Then There's) A Fool As I" / "I Need Your Love Tonight" (1959)

"I Got Stung" is a 1958 song recorded by Elvis Presley and released as a single written by Aaron Schroeder and David Hill and published by Elvis Presley's company Gladys Music, Inc. It was a number one hit in the UK in 1959 and again in 2005 as a double A-side single.

== Background ==
Clocking in at under two minutes, an upbeat, bouncy rock and roll number, it features some of Elvis' most rapid-fire vocals alongside humorous and catchy lyrics. It was released as a double A-side with "One Night", reaching No. 1 in the UK where it stayed for three weeks.

Presley recorded this, his final song of the 1950s, on June 11, 1958, when he went to Nashville during his US Army stint, as he was preparing to set sail for Germany. In the US, "I Got Stung" peaked at No. 8 on the Hot 100.

It was one of a number of Elvis Presley songs to be re-released in the United Kingdom in 2005 and it went to No. 1 again, in another double A-side release with "One Night".

== Album appearances ==
The song appeared on the 1959 compilation 50,000,000 Elvis Fans Can't Be Wrong.
