= Got a Lot o' Livin' to Do! =

Single by Elvis Presley

from the album Loving You
- A-side: "Party"
- B-side: "Got a Lot o' Livin' to Do!"
- Released: 1957
- Label: RCA
- Songwriters: Aaron Schroeder; Ben Weisman

"Got a Lot o' Livin' to Do!" is a song first recorded by Elvis Presley as part of the soundtrack for his 1957 motion picture Loving You.

== History ==
The song was written by Aaron Schroeder and Ben Weisman. The latter, a songwriter from New York, came (according to the book Elvis Day by Day, "presumably in hopes of seeing that his song, "Got a Lot O' Livin' to Do," [would] be included in the soundtrack“) to the recording studio in Hollywood where Presley was working on the songs for the movie. Elvis Presley later recalled:

I looked at him, smiled, asked his name, and why he was in the studio. He said he was Ben Weisman, and he had composed the song "Got A Lot O' Livin' To Do". I hollered at the guys to come out and we started playing the song. After that day, Ben and I became really good friends and he would wind up writing fifty-seven songs for me. Funny how chance meetings end up!

No other songwriter wrote as many songs for Presley as Ben Weisman did.

== Reception ==
In Europe "Got a Lot o' Livin' to Do!" was released as a single with "Party" on the other side. Both songs appeared on the UK Singles Chart (as published by the Official Charts Company): "Party" charted 15 weeks, peaking at number 2 for the week of October 10, while "Got a Lot o' Livin' to Do!" charted 4 weeks, peaking at number 17 for the week of October 24.

== Musical style and lyrics ==
The song is a sprightly, speedy number. Its lyrics include the line: "There's a moon that's big and bright".

== Charts ==
Chart (1957)	Peak position
UK Singles Chart (Official Charts Company)	17
