= I Gotta Know =

Song by Cliff Richard
- Recorded: September 1959
- Genre: Doo-wop
- Composer(s): Paul Evans
- Lyricist(s): Matt Williams

"I Gotta Know" is a song recorded by Cliff Richard in September 1959 and Elvis Presley on 4 April 1960. The composer was Paul Evans; lyrics are by Matt Williams.

Originally released by Presley as the B-side of "Are You Lonesome Tonight?", it nevertheless reached number 20 on the US charts. It was engineered by Nashville sound pioneer Bill Porter. The single with "I Gotta Know" on the B-side went on to be one of the biggest-selling singles of 1960, peaking at number one on the Billboard pop chart from November 28 for six weeks and peaking at number three on the R&B charts.

"I Gotta Know" is a love song in G major, described as a "mild rocker". It is in the Doo-wop rhythm and blues style, progressing from G to C to D7.

Billboard published a list of the "RCA Victor chartmakers of 1960" in the 19 December 1960 edition, which included the hit with other successful recordings made at the famous RCA Victor Studios in Nashville that year.
