= A Big Hunk o' Love =

- Single cover art work for A Big Hunk O' Love by Elvis Presley

Single by Elvis Presley
- B-side: "My Wish Came True"
- Released: June 23, 1959
- Recorded: June 10, 1958
- Studio: RCA Studio B, Nashville
- Genre: Rock and roll; rockabilly
- Length: 2:12
- Label: RCA Victor
- Songwriters: Aaron Schroeder, Sidney Wyche
- Producer: Steve Sholes

Elvis Presley singles chronology
| "I Need Your Love Tonight" (1959) | "A Big Hunk o' Love" (1959) | "Stuck on You" (1960) |

Music video
- "A Big Hunk o' Love" (audio) on YouTube

"A Big Hunk o' Love" is a song originally recorded by Elvis Presley and released as a single on June 23, 1959 by RCA Victor, which topped the Billboard Hot 100 for two weeks.

The song was revived by Presley during his engagements at the Las Vegas Hilton in February 1972 and was used regularly in his live shows until mid-1973. It was performed live for the last time on January 26, 1974. The song is included in the 1972 documentary Elvis On Tour and his 1973 show broadcast via satellite, Aloha from Hawaii. During this time period, it was played by the Elvis' TCB Band, and featured Glen D. Hardin and James Burton.

The song was written by Aaron Schroeder and Sidney Wyche, under the name Sid Jaxon and published by Elvis Presley's company Gladys Music, Inc. Aaron Schroeder (along with Wally Gold), also wrote "It's Now or Never" and "Good Luck Charm", both of which, like "A Big Hunk o' Love", were originally recorded by American rock and roll icon Elvis Presley.

Syd Wyche is best known for writing the jazz standard "Alright, Okay, You Win", whereas Aaron Schroeder co-wrote many hits in the rock`n`roll area, from "Fools Hall of Fame" (Pat Boone) to "Because They're Young" (Duane Eddy). In an interview conducted by Jan-Erik Kjeseth, he also revealed that in fact he worked with his partner Wally Gold in order to improve a song submitted by another writer, and the result was "It's My Party", a big hit for Lesley Gore. Schroeder and Gold tossed a coin as to whose name should go on the record, and Gold "won".

The song appeared on the 1959 compilation 50,000,000 Elvis Fans Can't Be Wrong, the 2002 career retrospective ELV1S: 30#1 Hits, and the 2016 compilation The Wonder of You.

== Recording ==
"A Big Hunk o' Love", a hard, driving rocker, was recorded at Elvis' first and only session during his two years of Army service. The session took place on June 10, 1958, in Nashville, Tennessee. It was the first session that did not include guitarist Scotty Moore and bassist Bill Black, who had both worked with Elvis since his first recordings for Sam Phillips at the Memphis Recording Service, which later became known as Sun Studios.

The recording featured Elvis' drummer D.J. Fontana and backing vocalists the Jordanaires, who would continue to work with Elvis until Elvis' appearance at the Hilton in Las Vegas. The rest of the musicians were noted Nashville session men, such as guitarist Hank Garland on a Gibson Byrdland guitar, Floyd Cramer on piano, Bob Moore on double bass, and Buddy Harman and D.J. Fontana on drums. The song was recorded in four takes, the released version is actually spliced from takes three and four.

== Personnel ==
- Elvis Presley – lead vocals, rhythm guitar
- Chet Atkins – rhythm guitar
- Hank Garland – lead guitar
- Bob Moore – double bass
- D.J. Fontana, Buddy Harman – drums
- Floyd Cramer – piano
- Steve Sholes – producer
- Bob Ferris – engineer

== Release and chart performance ==
RCA Victor had paired "A Big Hunk o' Love" for release as a single with "My Wish Came True" as the B-side in both the United States and England. When the single was released on June 23, it was the third release to come from Elvis' army session after "I Got Stung" on October 21, 1958, and "I Need Your Love Tonight" b/w "(Now and Then There's) A Fool Such as I" on March 10, 1959.

The A-side spent two weeks at No. 1 on the Billboard Hot 100 while the B-side peaked at No. 12. The single was less successful on the Cashbox Top 100 with the A-side peaking at No. 2 and the B-side at No. 23. On the UK Singles Chart the A-side peaked at No. 4, while the B-side did not appear on the chart. The A-side also peaked at No. 10 on Billboard magazine's R&B Singles chart.

Presley's next single was another Aaron Schroeder co-composition, "Stuck on You". "A Big Hunk o' Love" was the first of four of Schroeder's songs that became No. 1 hits for Presley.

"A Big Hunk o' Love" b/w "My Wish Came True" was Presley's last commercially released Canadian 78 RPM. It was Elvis' first single to not receive a 78 RPM pressing in the United States.

== Single track listings ==
1959 7" 45 RPM
| No. | Title | Writer(s) | Length |
|---|---|---|---|
| 1. | "A Big Hunk o' Love" | Aaron Schroeder, Sid Jaxon | 2:12 |
| 2. | "My Wish Came True" | Ivory Joe Hunter | 2:32 |

2007 7" 45 RPM
| No. | Title | Writer(s) | Length |
|---|---|---|---|
| 1. | "A Big Hunk o' Love" | Schroeder, Sidney Wyche |
| 2. | "My Wish Came True" | Hunter |
| 3. | "A Big Hunk o' Love – Alt. Take 1" | Schroeder, Wyche |

== See also ==
- List of Billboard Hot 100 number-one singles of 1959
