= King Creole (song) =

Single by Elvis Presley

from the album King Creole
- B-side: "Dixieland Rock"
- Released: September 1958
- Recorded: January 23, 1958
- Studio: Radio Recorders, Hollywood, California
- Genre: Rock and roll
- Label: RCA
- Songwriter(s): Jerry Leiber and Mike Stoller
- Producer(s): Felton Jarvis

Elvis Presley singles chronology
"Hard Headed Woman" (1958)	"King Creole" (1958)	"One Night" (1958)

King Creole is a song written by Jerry Leiber and Mike Stoller. The song was performed by Elvis Presley and recorded in 1958, and laid foundations to a musical drama film, King Creole. The song is based on King Creole, a singer/guitar player from New Orleans who is proficient in all different styles of rock and roll.

The song was released as a single in the UK in 1958. It reached No. 2 in the UK Singles Chart. In 2007 the single was re-released and spent one week in the chart at No. 15.

== Content ==
The song is about a man of Creole descent who is a freelancing street performer in New Orleans. The man in the song, who goes by the nickname of King Creole, is known for his style of solo guitar playing. It is said in the song that he "holds his guitar like a Tommy gun", which gives the notion that "King Creole" used a grip on his guitar which involved keeping the body of the guitar close to his center of his chest, therefore holding the neck of the guitar in an extended arm, though no information is given which arm he used. It can be inferred from the song that King Creole used an electric guitar, since the song mentions string bending and rock-and-roll, a genre not usually played as lead on the acoustic guitar. The song also states that King Creole played from a well-rounded song repertoire, and would play light, dark, serious, and nonsense music.

== Viva Elvis version ==
In 2010, Sony Music released a remix version of the song in the album Viva Elvis, an album used for the Presley show of Cirque du Soleil. The song has a reggae rock feel, and a driving drum rhythm.
