= Paralyzed (Elvis Presley song) =

Song by Elvis Presley

from the album Elvis
- Released: October 19, 1956
- Recorded: September 1, 1956
- Genre: Rock and roll
- Length: 2:18
- Label: RCA Victor
- Songwriters: Otis Blackwell, Elvis Presley

"Paralyzed" is a 1956 song recorded by Elvis Presley for his album Elvis. The song was recorded on September 1, 1956, and has been well received by music critics. The song was written by Otis Blackwell, with Elvis receiving a songwriting credit.

== Chart history ==
1956 UK sheet music, Aberbach, London.

"Paralyzed" reached No. 59 on the Billboard pop singles chart in 1956. The song was off of the Elvis album. The song was released as an EP by RCA Victor in the U.S.: Elvis Volume 1, RCA EPA-992, which was released on October 19, 1956. The EP peaked on the Billboard EP Chart at #4.

In the UK, "Paralyzed" reached No. 8 after its release in August, 1957 in a 10-week chart run as an HMV single, 45-POP 378, backed with "When My Blue Moon Turns to Gold Again".

== Album appearances ==
Elvis Presley performed the song on the 1956 Million Dollar Quartet sessions and live in concert in 1956. A live version is featured on the 5-CD box set The Young Man with the Big Beat (2011). The song also appears on the 1990 BMG collection The Million Dollar Quartet and The Complete Million Dollar Quartet. The song is also on the box set The King of Rock and Roll: The Complete 1950s Masters by RCA/BMG. The song was also performed on the December 16, 1956, Louisiana Hayride.

== Personnel ==
The song was recorded at Radio Recorders, Hollywood, California, produced by Steve Sholes and engineered by Thorne Nogar.

Musicians:

- Guitar: Elvis Presley
- Guitar: Scotty Moore
- Bass: Bill Black
- Drums: D.J. Fontana
- Piano: Elvis Presley
- Backup Vocals: The Jordanaires: Gordon Stoker; Neal Matthews; Hoyt Hawkins; Hugh Jarrett

== Other recordings by notable artists ==
Dave Edmunds recorded the song in 1986 as part of his live album I Hear You Rockin'. Ronnie McDowell, Graham Parker, Johnny Earl and The Jordanaires, Alan Merrill and Billy Fury have also recorded the song.

== Sources ==
- Victor, Adam. The Elvis Encyclopedia. Overlook Duckworth; 2008. ISBN 1-58567-598-9.
- Wadey, Paul. "Jake Hess". The Independent. January 8, 2004 [cited December 28, 2009].
- Warwick, Neil; Kutner, Jon; Brown, Tony. The Complete Book of the British Charts: Singles & Albums. 3rd ed. Omnibus Press; 2004. ISBN 1-84449-058-0.
- Waters, Lindsay. "Come Softly, Darling, Hear What I Say: Listening in a State of Distraction—A Tribute to the Work of Walter Benjamin, Elvis Presley, and Robert Christgau". Boundary 2. Spring 2003.
- Whitburn, Joel. Billboard Top 1000 Singles 1955–1992. Billboard Books; 1993. ISBN 0-7935-2072-X.
- Whitburn, Joel. The Billboard Book of Top 40 Hits. 8th ed. Billboard Books; 2004. ISBN 0-8230-7499-4
