= Rock-A-Hula Baby =

- Original US picture sleeve

Single by Elvis Presley

from the album Blue Hawaii
- A-side: "Can't Help Falling in Love"
- Released: November 21, 1961
- Recorded: March 23, 1961, Radio Recorders, Hollywood, California
- Genre: Pop, rock and roll
- Length: 1:58
- Label: RCA Victor
- Songwriters: Ben Weisman; Fred Wise; Dolores Fuller
- Producer: Steve Sholes

Elvis Presley singles chronology
"Little Sister" (1961)	"Rock-A-Hula Baby" / "Can't Help Falling in Love" (1961)	"Good Luck Charm" / "Anything That's Part of You" (1962)

"Rock-A-Hula Baby ("Twist" Special)" is a 1961 song recorded by Elvis Presley and performed in the 1961 film Blue Hawaii. The song was also released as a single.

== Background ==
The song was recorded on March 23, 1961, at Radio Recorders in Hollywood, California. The RCA Victor 45 single was released on November 21, 1961, with "Can't Help Falling in Love" as the A-side. Steve Sholes produced the studio recording session. The Jordanaires provided the backing vocals. The song was published by Gladys Music, Inc., Elvis Presley's publishing company and was written by Ben Weisman, Fred Wise, and Dolores Fuller, it is a genre mix of Hawaiian folk and rock and roll. It was the first song published by Fuller, who would eventually co-write a dozen songs for Presley. The title song of the 1991 film Rock-a-Doodle, which featured Elvis Presley's original backing vocal group The Jordanaires, parodied "Rock-a-Hula Baby".

== Charts ==
"Rock-A-Hula Baby" peaked at No. 23 in the US on the Billboard pop singles chart, No. 1 in Australia, No. 4 in Canada, and No. 1 in the Philippines. In the United Kingdom (UK), where it was a double A-sided release with "Can't Help Falling in Love", it peaked at No. 1 in the UK Singles Chart in February 1962, and spent four weeks at the chart summit. When re-released in March 2005, it reached No. 3 in the UK in a four-week chart run.

== Other recordings ==
Paul Rich, Werner Müller and The London Festival Orchestra & Chorus, Tulsa McLean, Pop Will Eat Itself, Martin Fontaine, Stephen Collins, John Stamos, Terry Buchwald, Steven Pitman, and Junior Brown have also recorded the song.
