= I Want You, I Need You, I Love You =

Single by Elvis Presley
- B-side: "My Baby Left Me"
- Released: May 4, 1956
- Recorded: April 14, 1956
- Studio: RCA Victor, Nashville
- Genre: Rock and roll, ballad
- Length: 2:37
- Label: RCA Victor
- Songwriters: Maurice Mysels, Ira Kosloff
- Producer: Steve Sholes

Elvis Presley singles chronology
"Heartbreak Hotel" (1956)	"I Want You, I Need You, I Love You" (1956)	"Don't Be Cruel" / "Hound Dog" (1956)

"I Want You, I Need You, I Love You" is a song written by Maurice Mysels and Ira Kosloff. It is best known for being Elvis Presley's seventh single release on the RCA Victor label, produced by Steve Sholes. It was released in May 1956, becoming Presley's second number 1 single on the country music charts, and peaking at number 3 on the US Billboard Top 100 chart, a predecessor to the U.S. Billboard Hot 100. Before the establishment of the Billboard Hot 100 chart in 1958, there were a number of charts including Jukebox plays, Store charts, and Airplay charts; the song reached number 1 on the Billboard Top Sellers in Stores chart.

== Recording ==
During April 1956, Variety reported that Presley's sixth RCA Victor single, "Heartbreak Hotel", had sold one million copies. RCA Victor producer Steve Sholes wanted a strong single for the next release, aware that there was not much good material available. Due to Presley's busy touring schedule, Sholes needed to get him into the studio as soon as possible. Presley and his band chartered a small propeller airplane to Nashville for one day of recording between shows.

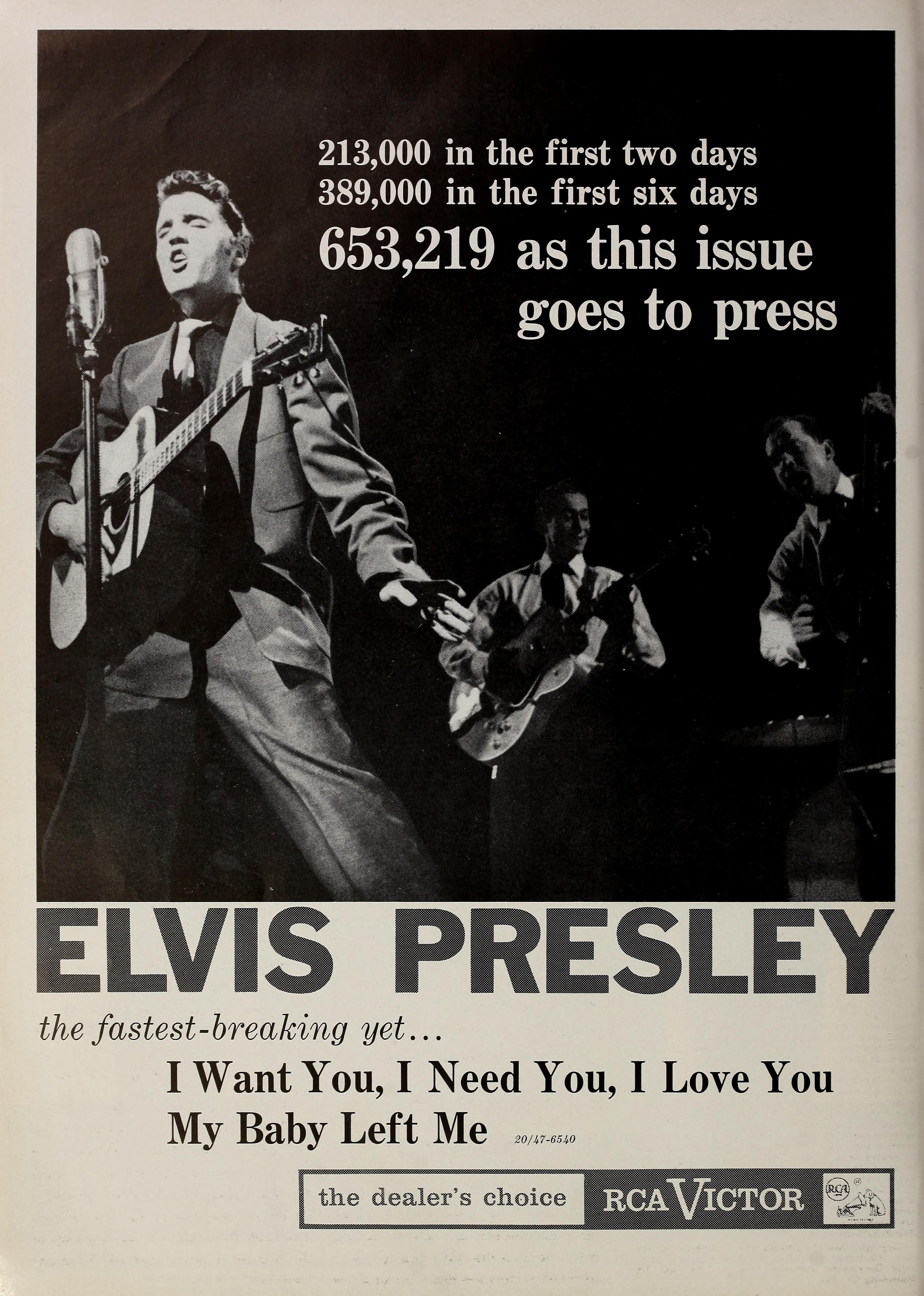
Advertisement featured in Cashbox magazine, 19 May 1956

En route from Amarillo, the airplane developed engine trouble and fell through the sky several times. Upon arrival in Nashville on the morning of April 14, all four were disconcerted. Presley arrived at the RCA Victor Studios without ideas for the recording session and therefore had no choice but to use Sholes' suggestions, one of which was "I Want You, I Need You, I Love You".

Being used to later working hours, coupled with his traumatic experience during his overnight flight, the recording session was bad. Take after take was ruined for one reason or another and the band was not relaxed. Presley, usually a very quick study with a song, could not get the lyrics right. After 17 takes in three hours, Sholes decided Presley and the band were not able to record properly and sent them home.

After the session, Sholes listened to the takes again. He was not happy with the results of what he considered to be an unprofessional and wasted session. It had cost $1,000 ($12,000 in 2025) to fly Presley and his band in by a private flight, and Sholes let Presley's manager, Colonel Tom Parker, know that he was unsatisfied with the work and required material urgently for a second album. He knew that with Presley's busy touring schedule it could be months before RCA Victor got him back into a studio. Performing what was a very rare and generally unsuccessful procedure for the 1950s, Sholes took parts of two takes he liked (takes 14 and 17), cut and spliced them together to create a take worthy of release. His cuts were so seamless, nobody at RCA Victor could tell it was not from a single take.

== Reception ==
"I Want You, I Need You, I Love You" was backed with "My Baby Left Me" and was released on May 4, 1956. Pre-orders of over 300,000 were the biggest ever in the history of the company. At the time of its release, Presley had three songs in the Top 20: "Heartbreak Hotel/I Was the One", "My Baby Left Me", and "I Want You, I Need You, I Love You". On June 5, 1956, Presley performed the song on The Milton Berle Show, as well as an early version of "Hound Dog" that resulted in both overwhelmingly favorable audience reaction and outrage. Despite the heated public controversy, the single was generally well-received, reaching No. 3 on the Billboard Top 100 chart, and scoring No. 1 on the country music chart. The song earned a second gold record for Presley, with sales in excess of 1.3 million.

== Cover versions ==
Robby Krieger performed an instrumental version of the song on his 1989 solo album, No Habla.

== In popular culture ==
John Lennon mentioned the song in the final interview he recorded on December 8, 1980, noting, "If I hear Elvis, I heard him singing "I Want You, I Need You, I Love You" the other day, I mean I was just in heaven. I mean, of course I was going back to my youth and remembering the dates, and what was going on when I heard that music.”

The song “Two Out of Three Ain't Bad” (1977) was inspired by the song's title, with the chorus lamenting, "I want you, I need you, but there ain't no way I'm ever gonna love you".
