= Don't (Elvis Presley song) =

Single by Elvis Presley
- B-side: "I Beg of You"
- Released: January 7, 1958
- Recorded: September 6, 1957
- Studio: Radio Recorders, Hollywood
- Length: 2:48
- Label: RCA Victor
- Songwriter: Jerry Leiber and Mike Stoller

Elvis Presley singles chronology
"Jailhouse Rock" (1957)	"Don't" (1958)	"Wear My Ring Around Your Neck" (1958)

Music video
- "Don't" (audio) on YouTube

"Don't" is a song recorded by Elvis Presley and released in 1958. Written and produced by Jerry Leiber and Mike Stoller, it was Presley's eleventh number-one hit in the United States. "Don't" also peaked at number four on the R&B charts. Billboard ranked the ballad as the No. 3 song for 1958.

The song was included in the musical revue Smokey Joe's Cafe, as a medley with "Love Me", and cleverly used in the key scene of the 1993 film Dave, right at the moment the President of the United States (played by Kevin Kline), suffers a stroke while having sex with a mistress, inside the White House.

== Personnel ==
- Elvis Presley – lead vocals
- Scotty Moore – electric guitar
- Bill Black – double bass
- D. J. Fontana – drums
- Dudley Brooks – piano
- The Jordanaires – backing vocals
- Thorne Nogar – engineer
- Steve Sholes – producer
- Jerry Leiber – songwriter

== Charts ==
Chart (1958)	Peak position
UK Singles Chart	2
US Billboard Hot 100	1
US Hot Country Singles (Billboard)	2
US Hot R&B Singles (Billboard)	4
