= I Beg of You =

Single by Elvis Presley
- A-side: "Don't"
- Released: January 7, 1958
- Recorded: February 23, 1957
- Studio: Radio Recorders Studios, Hollywood
- Genre: Pop rock
- Length: 1:50
- Label: RCA Victor
- Songwriters: Rose Marie McCoy, Kelly Owens

Elvis Presley singles chronology
"I Beg of You" / "Don't" (1958)	"Wear My Ring Around Your Neck" / "Doncha' Think It's Time" (1958)

I Beg of You is a song written by Rose Marie McCoy and Kelly Owens. It was recorded by Elvis Presley on February 23, 1957, at Radio Recorders, Hollywood and reached No. 8 on the Billboard Top 100 chart on February 1, 1958.

== Single track listing ==
1958 7" 45 RPM
No.	Title	Writer(s)	Length
1.	"Don't"	Jerry Leiber and Mike Stoller	2:49
2.	"I Beg Of You"	Rose Marie McCoy and Kelly Owens	1:50

== Chart performance ==
Chart (1958)	Peak position
U.S. Billboard Hot 100	8
U.S. Billboard Hot Country Singles	4
