= Love Me (Leiber/Stoller song) =

- 1956 sheet music cover

Song by Elvis Presley

from the album Elvis
- Released: October 19, 1956
- Recorded: September 1, 1956
- Studio: Radio Recorders, Hollywood, California
- Genre: Pop
- Length: 2:43
- Label: RCA Victor
- Songwriter: Jerry Leiber and Mike Stoller

"Love Me" is a ballad composed by Jerry Leiber and Mike Stoller and recorded and popularized by Elvis Presley in 1956.

== Background ==
The song was initially recorded by R&B duo, Willy & Ruth, in 1954 (Spark 105), garnering a review spotlight in Billboard on August 14. Willie Headen was the lead singer of a vocal group, the Honey Bears, and Ruth was the wife of another group member. That record was quickly followed the same year with cover versions by Georgia Gibbs, Connie Russell, Billy Eckstine, Kay Brown, the Four Escorts, the Billy Williams Quartet, the Woodside Sisters and the DeMarco Sisters, and in January 1955 by Jimmie Rodgers Snow. Most of these records were well reviewed in the trades, but none was a hit.

== Elvis Presley recording ==
Elvis Presley recorded the song on September 1, 1956, for his second album, Elvis (RCA Victor, LPM-1382), issued on October 19. It was also released on the EP, Elvis Vol. 1 (RCA Victor, EPA-992). It climbed to the number 2 position on the Billboard Top 100 in the United States, a first for a title not coming from a single. "Love Me" also peaked at number 7 on the R&B chart. "Love Me" was not released as a single to avoid confusion with Presley's "Love Me Tender". Presley sang "Love Me" on the October 28, 1956, Ed Sullivan Show. He included the song in the 1968 NBC Network Comeback Special and often performed it in concerts in the seventies, including his last tour in June 1977.
