= Too Much (Elvis Presley song) =

1957 single by Elvis Presley

Single by Elvis Presley
- B-side: "Playing for Keeps"
- Released: January 4, 1957
- Recorded: September 2, 1956
- Studio: Radio Recorders, Hollywood
- Genre: Rock and roll
- Length: 2:33
- Label: RCA Victor
- Songwriters: Lee Rosenberg, Bernard Weinman

Elvis Presley singles chronology
"Love Me Tender" (1956)	"Too Much" (1957)	"All Shook Up" (1957)

Music video
- "Too Much" (audio) on YouTube

"Too Much" is a #1 song most notably recorded in a hit version by Elvis Presley and published by Elvis Presley Music in 1956. It was written by Bernard Weinman and Lee Rosenberg. It was first released in 1955 by Bernard Hardison on Republic Records. Presley recorded the song in September 1956 and first performed it on January 6, 1957, on CBS-TV's The Ed Sullivan Show. Released as a single, Presley's "Too Much" reached number one on both the Cashbox and Billboard sales charts and went to number three on the R&B chart. The single peaked at number two on the then-named Top 100 chart, the main Billboard pop chart.

== Charts and certifications ==
Chart (1957)	Peak position
US Billboard Top 100	2
US Billboard Best Sellers in Stores	1
US Billboard Most Played by Jockeys	2
US Billboard Most Played in Jukeboxes	1
US Billboard Hot Country Singles	3
US Billboard Hot R&B Singles	3
