= I Need Your Love Tonight =

Single by Elvis Presley
- A-side: "A Fool Such as I"
- Released: March 10, 1959
- Recorded: June 10, 1958
- Studio: RCA Studio B, Nashville
- Genre: Rock and roll
- Length: 2:04
- Label: RCA Victor
- Songwriters: Sid Wayne, Bix Reichner

Elvis Presley singles chronology
"One Night" (1958)	"I Need Your Love Tonight" (1959)	"A Big Hunk o' Love" (1959)

"I Need Your Love Tonight" is a song recorded by Elvis Presley and released as a single written by Sid Wayne and Bix Reichner. It was published by Elvis Presley's company Gladys Music, Inc.

== Background ==
Elvis Presley recorded the song on June 10, 1958, in RCA Studios, Nashville, Tennessee. It was the second of multiple single releases recorded at a final session conducted just prior to him leaving the US for Germany to serve in the United States Army; he would not return to a recording studio until the spring of 1960.

The song reached number four on the Billboard pop singles chart in 1959. Released as a double A-side with "A Fool Such as I", the song reached No. 1 in the UK Singles Chart in May 1959 for five weeks.

"I Need Your Love Tonight" b/w "(Now And Then There's) A Fool Such As I" was Presley's first single to not receive a 78 RPM pressing in the United States.

== In popular culture ==
The song is featured in the 2005 film Lilo & Stitch 2: Stitch Has a Glitch.
