= Wear My Ring Around Your Neck =

1958 single by Elvis Presley

Single by Elvis Presley
- B-side: "Doncha' Think It's Time"
- Released: April 7, 1958
- Recorded: February 1, 1958
- Studio: Radio Recorders, Hollywood
- Genre: Rock and roll
- Length: 2:15
- Label: RCA Victor
- Songwriters: Bert Carroll, Russell Moody
- Producer: Steve Sholes

Elvis Presley singles chronology
"Don't" (1958)	"Wear My Ring Around Your Neck" (1958)	"Hard Headed Woman" (1958)

"Wear My Ring Around Your Neck" is a song written by Bert Carroll and Russell Moody, performed by Elvis Presley, which was released in 1958. It was particularly notable for breaking a string of ten consecutive number 1 hits for Presley achieved in just two years. Although it was Presley's sixth number-one hit in the American R&B charts, it only peaked at number 2 on the American pop charts.

== Personnel ==
- Elvis Presley – lead vocals, rhythm guitar, guitar percussion, piano
- Scotty Moore – lead guitar
- Bill Black – bass guitar
- D. J. Fontana – drums
- Dudley Brooks – piano
- The Jordanaires – backing vocals

== Chart performance ==
Chart (1958)	Peak position
UK Singles Chart	3
US Billboard Hot 100	3
U.S. Billboard Hot Country Singles	3
U.S. Billboard Hot R&B Singles	1

== Ricky Van Shelton version ==
American country music singer Ricky Van Shelton covered the song for the soundtrack of the 1992 movie Honeymoon in Vegas. Shelton's version, also included on his album Greatest Hits Plus, where it was released as the album's first single and it peaked at number 26 on the Billboard Hot Country Singles & Tracks chart.

=== Chart performance ===
Chart (1992)	Peak position
Canada Country Singles (RPM)	29
US Hot Country Songs (Billboard)	26
