= Hard Headed Woman =

1958 single by Elvis Presley

Single by Elvis Presley

from the album King Creole
- B-side: "Don't Ask Me Why"
- Released: June 10, 1958
- Recorded: January 15, 1958
- Studio: Radio Recorders, Hollywood
- Genre: Rock and roll
- Length: 1:54
- Label: RCA Victor
- Songwriter: Claude Demetrius

Elvis Presley singles chronology
"Wear My Ring Around Your Neck" (1958)	"Hard Headed Woman" (1958)	"One Night" (1958)

Music video
- "Hard Headed Woman" (audio) on YouTube

"Hard Headed Woman" is a rock and roll song recorded by Elvis Presley and published by Gladys Music, Presley's publishing company, in 1958. It is an American 12-bar blues written by African American songwriter Claude Demetrius. It was most notably recorded as a rock and roll song by Presley as part of the soundtrack for his 1958 motion picture King Creole, and was included on the record album of the same name. The song was also released as a single in both 78 RPM and 45 RPM formats. In 1958, it went to No. 1 July 21st on the Billboard charts and went to No. 2 for two weeks on the R&B chart. Notably, it became the first rock and roll single to earn the RIAA designation of Gold Record. When the song went to number one, Elvis was at Fort Hood, Texas, doing basic training.

It was later recorded by Wanda Jackson on the album Live at Town Hall Party 1958. "Hard Headed Woman" was also released as a 45 rpm and received substantial airplay in the late 1950s. The singing on the Jackson version incorporates an extreme use of vocal fry, making it difficult to tell if the singer is male or female.

== Lyrics ==
The song's lyrics center around the idea that "women have been trouble for men since the beginning of the world", a point illustrated through the examples of the biblical figures Adam and Eve, Samson and Delilah, and Jezebel.

== Charts ==
Chart (1958)	Peak position
Belgium (Ultratop 50 Flanders)	17
Belgium (Ultratop 50 Wallonia)	30
Canada (CHUM Hit Parade)	1
UK Singles Chart	2
US Billboard Best Sellers in Stores	1
US Billboard Hot Country Singles	2
US Billboard Hot R&B Singles	2
US Cash Box Top 100	3

Chart (2007)	Peak position
Netherlands (Single Top 100)	78

== Certifications ==
Certifications for "Hard Headed Woman"
Region	Certification	Certified units/sales
United States (RIAA)	Platinum	1,000,000^{^}
^{^} Shipments figures based on certification alone.
