= Stephen H. Sholes =

American record producer, music executive

Steve Sholes
- Born: Stephen Henry Sholes; February 12, 1911; Washington, D.C.
- Died: April 22, 1968 (aged 57) Nashville, Tennessee
- Genres: Rock and roll; country; pop
- Occupation: Record producer
- Instruments: Saxophone; clarinet
- Label: RCA Victor

Stephen Henry Sholes (February 12, 1911 – April 22, 1968) was an American recording executive with RCA Victor.

== Career ==
Sholes was born in Washington, D.C., and moved with his family to Merchantville, New Jersey, at the age of nine, near where his father worked in the Victor Talking Machine Company plant in Camden. Sholes started work at Victor as a messenger boy in 1929 and worked part-time for the firm while a student at Rutgers University.

For a time, Sholes worked in RCA Victor's radio division in Camden but his experience playing saxophone and clarinet in dance bands led him to the record division. During World War II, he worked in the Army's V-disc operation, which made records for radio broadcast and for personal use by army personnel.

In 1945, Sholes became head of the RCA Victor country division in Nashville, Tennessee and was responsible for bringing such talent as Chet Atkins, Eddy Arnold, The Browns, Hank Locklin, Homer and Jethro, Hank Snow, Jim Reeves, and Pee Wee King to the label. In 1955, he signed Elvis Presley to RCA Victor. After becoming a pop producer in 1957, Sholes appointed Chet Atkins to succeed him as head of RCA Victor's Nashville division. In 1957, Sholes convinced RCA Victor to build its own recording studio in Nashville on Seventeenth Avenue South; this would become known as RCA Victor Studio B. The same year, he became the company's pop singles manager, then pop singles and albums manager in 1958, and West Coast manager in 1961, the latter promotion taking him to Los Angeles, California. In 1963, Sholes became RCA Victor vice president for pop A&R and returned to New York.

Sholes served on the Country Music Association (CMA) and Country Music Foundation (CMF) boards of directors. Sholes was inducted into the Country Music Hall of Fame, which he had worked to create, in 1967.

In 1968, Sholes suffered a heart attack and died at age 57 while driving to Vanderbilt University where his longtime friends, Homer and Jethro were recording a live album for RCA Victor.

Sholes was portrayed by actor Bart Hansard in the CBS mini-series Elvis (2005).
