= Tickle Me (EP) =

EP (soundtrack) by Elvis Presley
- Released: June 15, 1965
- Genre: Pop
- Length: 10:31
- Label: RCA Victor

Elvis Presley chronology
| Girl Happy (1965) | Tickle Me (1965) | Elvis for Everyone! (1965) |

Tickle Me is an extended play by Elvis Presley containing songs from the motion picture of the same name. It was released by RCA Victor in 1965.

In the UK, there were not one but two accompanying soundtrack EPs released, Tickle Me Vol. 1 and Tickle Me Vol. 2.

== Content ==
For the first time in his career, the budget did not allow new songs to be commissioned for a Presley film. The soundtrack was assembled from previously released recordings, recycling nine songs in total with some dating back to recording sessions from 1960.

All songs were taken, as originally pressed, from previously released albums but a new vocal was recorded for "I Feel That I've Known You Forever", and a harmony vocal and narration was removed on "I'm Yours".

Four of the songs were released on singles, with the other five on an extended play single as the official soundtrack. "(Such an) Easy Question," by Otis Blackwell and Winfield Scott, was paired with "It Feels So Right" by Fred Wise and Ben Weisman. Released previously on Pot Luck with Elvis and Elvis Is Back! respectively, they were reissued as catalogue 47-8585 in June 1965, with the A-side "(Such an) Easy Question" going to No. 11 on the Billboard Hot 100 and the B-side peaking at No. 55 independently. A second pairing, "I'm Yours" by Don Robertson and Hal Blair also from Pot Luck with "(It's a) Long Lonely Highway" by Doc Pomus and Mort Shuman from Kissin' Cousins, were reissued as the A and b sides respectively of catalogue item 47-8657 in August 1965, "I'm Yours" also peaking on the chart at No. 11.

"I'm Yours" was released on 45 rpm as presented on film and the flip side was the movie opening number "(It's a) Long Lonely Highway", but in an alternate take.

The soundtrack EP was issued in June 1965 containing the other five songs. It only reached No. 70 on the singles chart, another indication of format's lack of appeal by the mid-1960s, although the fact its contents featured songs that were already available on various still-in-catalog albums may have also played a role. RCA would only issue one more extended play single for Presley in 1967.

In the UK, a Tickle Me Vol. 2 EP was issued containing the four tracks released on singles in the US.

In the 1960s, to obtain all nine songs in long-playing format, one would have to acquire Elvis Is Back!, Something for Everybody, Pot Luck, and the Fun in Acapulco and Kissin' Cousins soundtracks (which featured some of the songs as non-movie "bonus tracks"). In 2005, Sony Music issued a compact disc soundtrack of Tickle Me on their specialty Presley-oriented collectors label, Follow That Dream. It featured the film's nine songs along with five bonus tracks.

== Reissues ==
Tickle Me was reissued on the Follow That Dream label in 2005 in a deluxe 2-disc CD collection containing the original Extended Play along with numerous alternate takes from the original recording sessions.

== Personnel ==
- Elvis Presley – vocals; guitar (recordings prior to June 1961)
- The Jordanaires, Millie Kirkham – backing vocals
- Boots Randolph – saxophone
- Scotty Moore, Hank Garland, Harold Bradley, Grady Martin, Jerry Kennedy – electric guitar
- Floyd Cramer – piano
- Bob Moore – double bass
- D. J. Fontana, Buddy Harman – drums

== Track listing ==
=== Tickle Me, Vol. 1 ===
Side one
| No. | Title | Writer(s) | Recording date | Length |
|---|---|---|---|---|
| 1. | "I Feel That I've Known You Forever" (from Pot Luck with Elvis) | Doc Pomus; Alan Jeffreys | March 19, 1962 | 1:39 |
| 2. | "Slowly but Surely" (from Fun in Acapulco) | Ben Weisman; Sid Wayne | May 27, 1963 | 2:12 |

Side two
| No. | Title | Writer(s) | Recording date | Length |
|---|---|---|---|---|
| 1. | "Night Rider" (from Pot Luck with Elvis) | Doc Pomus; Mort Shuman | October 15, 1961 | 2:08 |
| 2. | "Put the Blame on Me" (from Something for Everybody) | Fred Wise; Kay Twomey; Norman Blagman | March 12, 1961 | 1:57 |
| 3. | "Dirty, Dirty Feeling" (from Elvis Is Back!) | Jerry Leiber and Mike Stoller | April 3, 1960 | 1:35 |

=== Tickle Me, Vol. 2 (UK only) ===
Side one
| No. | Title | Writer(s) | Recording date | Length |
|---|---|---|---|---|
| 1. | "I'm Yours" (from Pot Luck with Elvis) | Hal Blair; Don Robertson | June 25–26, 1961 | 2:20 |
| 2. | "(It's a) Long, Lonely Highway" (from Kissin' Cousins) | Doc Pomus; Mort Shuman | May 27–28, 1963 | 2:18 |

Side two
| No. | Title | Writer(s) | Recording date | Length |
|---|---|---|---|---|
| 1. | "It Feels So Right" (from Elvis is Back!) | Ben Weisman; Fred Wise | March 20–21, 1960 | 2:08 |
| 2. | "(Such an) Easy Question" (from Pot Luck with Elvis) | Otis Blackwell; Winfield Scott | March 18–19, 1962 | 2:19 |

== Charts ==
Tickle Me (EP)
| Chart (1965) | Peak position |
|---|---|
| U.S. Billboard Hot 100 | 70 |
