= List of songs written by Doc Pomus and Mort Shuman =

This is a list of songs written by Doc Pomus and Mort Shuman, either together as a songwriting partnership, with other writers, or individually.

== By Doc Pomus and Mort Shuman ==
Sortable table
Year	Song	Original artist	^{U.S. Pop}	^{U.S. R&B}	^{UK Singles Chart}	Other charting versions, and notes
1957	"Love Roller Coaster"	Joe Turner	–	12	–	
1958	"White Bucks and Saddle Shoes"	Bobby Pedrick, Jr.	74	–	–	
1959	"I'm a Man"	Fabian	31	–	–	
1959	"Plain Jane"	Bobby Darin	38	–	–	
1959	"Turn Me Loose"	Fabian	9	–	–	
1959	"A Teenager in Love"	Dion and the Belmonts	5	–	28	1959: Marty Wilde, #2 UK; 1959: Craig Douglas, #13 UK
1959	"Hushabye"	The Mystics	20	–	–	1969: Jay & the Americans, #62 pop 1972: Robert John, #99 pop
1959	"Angel Face"	Jimmy Darren	47	–	–	
1959	"Two Fools"	Frankie Avalon	54	–	–	
1959	"I Dig Girls"	Bobby Rydell	46	–	–	
1959	"(If You Cry) True Love, True Love"	The Drifters	33	5	–	
1959	"Hound Dog Man"	Fabian	9	–	–	
1959	"Go, Jimmy, Go"	Jimmy Clanton	5	19	–	
1960	"Too Good"	Little Tony	–	–	19	
1960	"This Magic Moment"	The Drifters	16	4	–	1968: Jay & the Americans, #6 pop 1976: Richard Roundtree, #90 R&B; 1989: Rick James, #74 R&B
1960	"Lonely Winds"	The Drifters	54	9	–	
1960	"A Mess of Blues"	Elvis Presley	32	–	2	1983: Status Quo, #15 UK
1960	"Save the Last Dance for Me"	The Drifters	1	1	2	1974: The DeFranco Family, #18 pop 1979: The Drifters, #69 UK (reissue); 1983: Dolly Parton, #45 pop, #3 country 1987: Ben E. King, #69 UK; 1989: Bruce Willis, #80 UK; 1994: General Saint & Don Campbell, #75 UK; 2006: Michael Bublé, #99 pop
1960	"Wait"	Jimmy Clanton	91	–	–	
1960	"I'll Save the Last Dance for You"	Damita Jo	22	16	–	
1960	"I Count the Tears"	The Drifters	17	6	28	
1960	"Your Other Love"	The Flamingos	54	–	–	
1960	"First Taste of Love"	Ben E. King	53	–	27	
1961	"No One"	Connie Francis	34	–	–	1963: Ray Charles, #21 pop, #9 R&B, #35 UK; 1965: Brenda Lee, #98 pop
1961	"Havin' Fun"	Dion	42	–	–	
1961	"A Texan and a Girl from Mexico"	Anita Bryant	85	–	–	
1961	"Surrender"	Elvis Presley	1	–	1	2005: Elvis Presley, #2 UK (reissue)
1961	"Little Sister"	Elvis Presley	5	–	1	1987: Dwight Yoakam, #7 country 2005: Elvis Presley, #3 UK (reissue)
1961	"(Marie's the Name) His Latest Flame"	Elvis Presley	4	–	1	2005: Elvis Presley, #3 UK (reissue)
1961	"Sweets for My Sweet"	The Drifters	16	10	–	1963: The Searchers, #1 UK; 1979: Dawn, #54 pop 1994: CJ Lewis, #3 UK
1961	"Here Comes the Night"	Ben E. King	81	–	–	
1961	"Suspicion"	Elvis Presley	–	–	–	1964: Terry Stafford, #3 pop, #31 UK; 1976: Elvis Presley, #9 UK
1961	"Room Full of Tears"	The Drifters	72	–	–	
1962	"Ecstasy"	Ben E. King	56	–	–	
1962	"Seven Day Weekend"	Gary U.S. Bonds	27	–	–	
1962	"Spanish Lace"	Gene McDaniels	31	–	–	
1963	"Can't Get Used to Losing You"	Andy Williams	2	7	2	1983: The Beat, #3 UK
1963	"It's Been Nice (Goodnight)"	The Everly Brothers	–	–	26	
1963	"It's a Lonely Town (Lonely Without You)"	Gene McDaniels	64	–	–	
1963	"Kiss Me Quick"	Elvis Presley	34	–	14	
1964	"Viva Las Vegas"	Elvis Presley	29	–	17	1992: ZZ Top, #10 UK
1964	"Wrong for Each Other"	Andy Williams	34	–	–	
1966	"Petticoat White (Summer Sky Blue)"	Bobby Vinton	81	–	–	
1966	"World of Broken Hearts"	Sissie Houston	–	–	–	1967: Amen Corner, #24 UK

== By Doc Pomus solo or with other writers ==
Sortable table
Year	Song	Original artist	U.S. Pop	U.S. R&B	UK Singles Chart	Other charting versions, and notes
1956	"My Happiness Forever"	LaVern Baker	–	13	–	Written by Doc Pomus
1956	"Lonely Avenue"	Ray Charles	–	6	–	Written by Pomus
1957	"Young Blood"	The Coasters	8	1	–	Written by Pomus, Jerry Leiber and Mike Stoller; 1976: Bad Company, #20 pop 1987: Bruce Willis, #68 pop
1962	"She's Not You"	Elvis Presley	5	13	1	Written by Pomus, Jerry Leiber and Mike Stoller; 2005: Elvis Presley, #3 UK (reissue)
1963	"Don't Try to Change Me"	The Crickets	–	–	37	Written by Pomus, Peter Anders and Vini Poncia
1963	"Hopeless"	Andy Williams	13	–	–	Written by Pomus and Alan Jeffreys
1965	"Girl Happy"	Elvis Presley	–	–	–	Written by Pomus and Norman Meade. From Girl Happy soundtrack.
1965	"Let's Do the Freddie"	Chubby Checker	40	–	–	Written by Pomus and Dave Appell
1965	"I Feel That I've Known You Forever"	Elvis Presley	70	–	–	Written by Pomus and Alan Jeffreys. From Tickle Me EP.
1981	"There Must Be a Better World Somewhere"	B. B. King	–	91	–	Written by Pomus and Dr. John

== By Mort Shuman with other writers ==
Sortable table
Year	Song	Original artist	U.S. Pop	U.S. R&B	UK Singles Chart	Other charting versions, and notes
1964	"Little Children"	Billy J. Kramer & the Dakotas	7	–	1	Written by Mort Shuman and J. Leslie McFarland
1964	"Here I Go Again"	The Hollies	–	–	4	Written by Shuman and Clive Westlake
1964	"What Am I to You"	Kenny Lynch	–	–	37	Written by Shuman, Clive Westlake, and Kenny Lynch
1965	"Follow Me"	The Drifters	91	–	–	Written by Shuman and Kenny Lynch
1965	"The River"	Ken Dodd	–	–	3	Written by Shuman and Renato Angiolini
1966	"Love Is Just a Broken Heart"	Cilla Black	–	–	5	Written by Shuman, Kenny Lynch and Michelle Vendome
1966	"Sha La La La Lee"	The Small Faces	–	–	3	Written by Shuman and Kenny Lynch; 1978: Plastic Bertrand, #39 UK
1966	"Look at Granny Run, Run"	Howard Tate	19	12	–	Written by Shuman and Jerry Ragovoy
1967	"Time, Time"	Ed Ames	61	–	–	Written by Shuman, Armand Canfora, Joss Baselli, and Michel Jourdan
1967	"What Good Am I?"	Cilla Black	–	–	24	Written by Shuman and Kenny Lynch
1967	"Daylight Savin' Time"	Keith	79	–	–	Written by Shuman and Jerry Ross
1967	"What's It Gonna Be?"	Dusty Springfield	49	–	52	Written by Shuman and Jerry Ragovoy
1967	"Jackie"	Scott Walker	–	–	22	Written by Shuman, Jacques Brel and Gérard Jouannest; 1991: Marc Almond, #17 UK
1968	"Stop"	Howard Tate	76	15	–	Written by Shuman and Jerry Ragovoy
1971	"Get It While You Can"	Janis Joplin	78	–	–	Written by Shuman and Jerry Ragovoy
1972	"If We Only Have Love"	Dionne Warwick	84	–	–	Written by Shuman, Jacques Brel and Eric Blau
