= Prieto =

Prieto is a surname of Spanish origin. Notable people with the surname include:

- Abelardo Escobar Prieto (1938–2019), Mexican government official
- Alfredo Prieto (1965–2015), Salvadoran-American serial killer
- Amy Prieto, Colombian-American chemist
- Antonio Prieto (1926–2011), Chilean actor
- Carlos Prieto (born 1937), Mexican cellist
- Chris Prieto (born 1972), American baseball player and coach
- Guillermo Prieto (1818–1897), Mexican writer and government official
- Indalecio Prieto (1883–1962), Spanish politician
- Isabel Prieto de Landázuri (1833–1876), Spanish-Mexican poet and dramatist
- José Joaquín Prieto (1786–1854), 4th president of Chile
- Juan António Prieto, Spanish paralympic runner
- Juan Carlos Prieto, Spanish paralympic high jumper
- Lorene Prieto, Chilean-New Zealand actor
- Manuel Bulnes Prieto (1799–1866), general and 5th president of Chile
- Manuel García-Prieto, 1st Marquis of Alhucemas (1859–1938), Spanish prime minister
- Margarita Prieto Yegros (1936–2017), Paraguayan writer and journalist
- María Isabel Prieto Serrano (born 1973), Spanish politician
- Óscar Vargas Prieto (1917–1989), Peruvian soldier
- Rafael Reyes Prieto (1849–1921), general and president of Colombia
- Rodrigo Prieto (born 1965), Mexican cinematographer
- Rosario Prieto (born 1942), actress from Dominican Republic
- Tessa Prieto-Valdes (born 1963), Filipino columnist and socialite
- Victorio Riego Prieto (1932–2009), Paraguayan chess master
- Wilfredo Prieto (born 1978), Cuban artist

== See also ==
- Juan Prieto (disambiguation)
