= Night Rider (Elvis Presley song) =

Single by Elvis Presley
- A-side: "Kiss Me Quick" "Night Rider"
- Released: 1963
- Recorded: October 15, 1961
- Studio: RCA's Studio B, Nashville
- Label: RCA
- Songwriters: Doc Pomus, Mort Shuman

Elvis Presley European singles chronology
"One Broken Heart for Sale" / "They Remind Me Too Much of You" (1963)	"Kiss Me Quick" / "Night Rider" (1963)	"(You're the) Devil in Disguise" / "Please Don't Drag That String Around" (1963)

"Night Rider" is a song written by Doc Pomus and Mort Shuman and originally recorded by Elvis Presley for his album Pot Luck with Elvis.

The song was released as a B-side to "Kiss Me Quick" in Europe in 1963. In francophone Belgium, "Night Rider" was listed as a double A-side with "Kiss Me Quick", reaching number 29.

Later, the song was used for the soundtrack for Presley's 1965 film Tickle Me and included on the accompanying soundtrack EP as well.

== Composition ==
The song was written by Doc Pomus and Mort Shuman.

== Recording ==
According to the Elvis Presley official website, most part of Presley's album Pot Luck was recorded during a two-night recording session on March 18–19, 1962 at RCA's Studio B in Nashville, one song on that album was recorded for the film Blue Hawaii on March 22, 1961, and three songs were recorded on June 25, but "Night Rider" was recorded much later, on October 15, 1961. The song's recording features Jerry Kennedy and Scotty Moore on guitar, Bob Moore on bass, Buddy Harman and D.J. Fontana on drums, Floyd Cramer on piano and organ, Boots Randolph on saxophone and clarinet, Gordon Stoker on accordion and Millie Kirkham and the Jordanaires on vocals.

According to a website called SecondHandSongs, The Jordanaires don't actually sing on "Night Rider", even though they are credited.

== Track listing ==
7" single (RCA Victor 47-9452, 1963, Germany)
No.	Title	Writer(s)	Artist	Length
1.	"Kiss Me Quick"	Doc Pomus, Mort Shuman	Elvis Presley with the Jordanaires	2:46
2.	"Night Rider"	Doc Pomus, Mort Shuman	Elvis Presley with the Jordanaires	2:07

== Charts ==
Chart (1963)	Peak position
Belgium (Ultratop 50 Wallonia)	29
