= Puppet on a String (Elvis Presley song) =

1965 song by Elvis Presley

Single by Elvis Presley

from the album Girl Happy
- B-side: "Wooden Heart"
- Released: October 20, 1965
- Recorded: June 10, 1964
- Studio: Radio Recorders, Hollywood
- Genre: Rock and roll, pop
- Length: 2:39
- Label: RCA Victor
- Songwriters: Roy C. Bennett, Sid Tepper

Elvis Presley singles chronology
"I'm Yours" / "(It's a) Long Lonely Highway" (1965)	"Puppet on a String" / "Wooden Heart" (1965)	"Santa Claus Is Back in Town" (1966)

"Puppet on a String" is a 1965 song originally recorded by Elvis Presley. It was written by Roy C. Bennett and Sid Tepper and recorded by Elvis Presley for the MGM film Girl Happy, which was released on April 14, 1965.

== Background ==
Elvis Presley recorded the vocals for "Puppet on a String" along with other tracks on June 16, 1964 (over a backing track that was recorded earlier), during a recording session at Radio Recorders in Culver City outside of Los Angeles. The song was published by Elvis Presley's publishing company Gladys Music, Inc.

Released in the United States in 1965 as a single with the 1960 recording from the film G.I. Blues, "Wooden Heart", on the B-side, "Puppet on a String" reached number 14 on the Billboard Hot 100 for the week of December 25, 1965, where it would stay for two weeks. (The other single from the same movie, "Do the Clam", was released earlier in the same year and reached number 21.)

On December 4, 1965. the song entered to many lists of Billboard Top Sellers in Top Markets. Some days later, the song reached the position No. 5 on the Billboard Top 40 Easy Listening staying in that list during 8 weeks.

In Canada, the single reached number 3 in a 10-week chart run, entering the chart in November 1965. The single was certified Gold in the U.S. by the RIAA in March 1992.

== Musical style and lyrics ==
"Puppet on a String" is an easy listening love song or a ballad.

== Charts ==
Chart (1965)	Peak position
US Billboard Hot 100	14
