= Miller & Tysen =

Miller & Tysen are an American musical theater songwriting team consisting of composer Chris Miller and lyricist Nathan Tysen. They started collaborating in 1999 at New York University’s Graduate Musical Theatre Writing Program. Together they have written the scores to Tuck Everlasting, The Burnt Part Boys, Fugitive Songs, and The Mysteries of Harris Burdick. They have written the book, music, and lyrics to Revival and Dreamland (or a musical riff on Shakespeare's Midsummer set during the declassification of Area 51). Their television work includes songs for Sesame Street, Elmo’s World, and The Electric Company.

== Works ==
- Revival (2019) In development. Based on the short story “Eric Hermannson’s Soul” by Willa Cather. Co-commission from Playwrights Horizons and Theatreworks Silicon Valley.
- Dreamland (or a musical riff on Shakespeare's Midsummer set during the declassification of Area 51) premiered as a staged reading at the International Thespian Festival in June of 2019. Its world premiere was at Salina South High School in January 2020 with direction by Kate Lindsay.
- Tuck Everlasting's world premiere was at the Alliance Theatre in Atlanta, Georgia in January 2015. It then transferred to Broadway at the Broadhurst Theatre in March 2016. The book was by Claudia Shear and Tim Federle with direction by Casey Nicholaw. Based on the young adult novel by Natalie Babbitt. DMI Records released the Original Broadway Cast Recording on May 3, 2016.
- The Burnt Part Boys world premiere was at Barrington Stage Company in 2006. It then premiered Off-Broadway as a co-production by Playwrights Horizons and Vineyard Theatre in 2010. The book was by Mariana Elder with direction by Joe Calarco. There were developmental Lab productions at the Vineyard Theater in May 2009 and at New York Stage & Film in July 2009, directed by Erica Schmidt. Yellow Sound Label released the original cast album in October 2011.
- Fugitive Songs premiered Off-Broadway at the 45th Street Theatre in March 2008. The direction was by Joe Calarco. The production was nominated for a Drama Desk Award for Outstanding Revue in 2008. In September 2012 a studio cast album was released featuring Matt Caplan, Gavin Creel, Joshua Henry, Karen Olivio, Alysha Umphress, and Barrett Wilbert Weed on Yellow Sound Label.
- The Mysteries of Harris Burdick had its world premiere at Barrington Stage Company in 2008, after a workshop production in 2007. The book and direction were by Joe Calarco.

== Awards and recognition ==
- Samuel French Next Step Award (2017)
- Outer Critics Award for Best Musical (2016) Tuck Everlasting
- Drama League Nomination for Best Musical Tuck Everlasting
- Fred Ebb Award (2014)
- Lucille Lortel Nomination for Best Musical (2010) The Burnt Part Boys
- Edgerton Foundation New American Play Award (2009) The Burnt Part Boys
- Berkshire Eagle “Best of the Decade” (2009) The Mysteries of Harris Burdick
- Drama Desk Nomination for Best New Revue (2008) Fugitive Songs
- Boston Globe “Top Ten Pick of 2008” The Mysteries of Harris Burdick
- NEA Grant (2008) The Burnt Part Boys
- Kitty Carlisle Hart Musical Theatre Award (2007)
- Richard Rodgers Award (2006) True Fans
- American Theatre Critics New Play Award Finalist (2006) The Burnt Part Boys
- Darryl Roth Creative Spirit Award (2004) True Fans
- Frederick Loewe Foundation Grant (2004) The Mysteries of Harris Burdick
- Jonathan Larson Performing Arts Foundation Grant (2003)

== Recordings ==
- DREAMLAND, Studio Cast Recording, Craft Recordings/Concord Theatricals, released 2021
- TUCK EVERLASTING, Original Broadway Cast Recording, DMI Soundtracks, Released 2016
- FUGITIVE SONGS, Studio Cast Recording, Yellow Sound Label, Released 2012
- STARS OF DAVID, World Premiere Recording, Yellow Sound Label, Released 2014
- THE BURNT PART BOYS, Off-Broadway Cast Recording, Yellow Sound Label, Released 2011
- NIGEL RICHARDS: A SHINING TRUTH, Symble Records, 2009
- NEO: A Celebration of Emerging Talent in Musical Theatre, Benefiting the York Theatre Company, Jay Records, Released 2005
