= Girl Happy (soundtrack) =

Soundtrack album by Elvis Presley
- Released: March 2, 1965
- Recorded: March 1962 and June 1964
- Studio: Radio Recorders (Hollywood)
- Genres: Rock, pop
- Length: 24:16
- Label: RCA Victor
- Producer: George Stoll

Elvis Presley chronology
Roustabout (1964)	Girl Happy (1965)	Tickle Me (1965)

Singles from Girl Happy
- 1. "Do the Clam" Released: February 9, 1965; 2. "Puppet on a String" Released: October 20, 1965

Professional ratings
Review scores
Source	Rating
Allmusic	2/5 stars
Record Mirror	4/5 stars

Girl Happy is the tenth soundtrack album by American singer and musician Elvis Presley, released on RCA Victor Records in mono and stereo, LPM/LSP 3338, in March 1965 – the March 1 date is disputed. It is the soundtrack to the 1965 film of the same name starring Presley. Recording sessions took place at Radio Recorders in Hollywood, California, on June 10, 11, 12, and vocal overdubs by Presley on June 15, 1964. It peaked at number eight on the Top LP's chart. It was certified Gold on July 15, 1999, by the Recording Industry Association of America.

== Content ==
Excluding the singles compilation Elvis' Golden Records Volume 3, this was the sixth original Presley album in a row that was a soundtrack to a feature film. Eleven songs were recorded and all were used, with "The Meanest Girl in Town" originally released as "Yeah, She's Evil!" by Bill Haley & His Comets and released on Decca Records in July 1964, though Haley actually recorded his version six days after Presley. An error in mastering resulted in Presley's voice being sped up on several of the recordings, most notably the title track. RCA finally released a corrected (though outtake) version of the title track in its 1991 compilation Collectors Gold from the Movie Years. Eventually, the proper speed version was issued.

"Do the Clam" was released approximately a month ahead of the album as a single, peaking at number 21 on the Billboard Hot 100 and remaining on the chart for eight weeks. Its B-side – an unused track called "You'll Be Gone", written by Presley with "Memphis Mafia" entourage members Red West and Charlie Hodge – was derived from the March 18, 1962, sessions for Pot Luck with Elvis. A variant on the Cole Porter standard, "Begin the Beguine" (after Porter had denied permission to alter the lyrics), the new song was drafted using the Porter tune and lyric as a template. Not appearing in the film, it was added to the Girl Happy soundtrack album.

At the end of 1965, RCA released Harum Scarum the soundtrack album for Elvis's third movie of the year. Due to the fact that none of the songs included in that album had any single potential, RCA chose "Puppet on a String" backed with the five-year-old "Wooden Heart" for the Christmas single. Although "Puppet on a String" had already been available on the Girl Happy soundtrack album for months, that song still managed to reach number 14 on the Billboard Hot 100.

== Reissues ==
In 2003 Girl Happy was reissued on the Follow That Dream label in a special edition that contained the original album tracks along with numerous alternate takes.

== Track listing ==
=== Original release (1965) ===
Side one
No.	Title	Writer(s)	Recording date	Length
1.	"Girl Happy"	Doc Pomus and Norman Meade	June 10, 1964	2:07
2.	"Spring Fever"	Bernie Baum, Bill Giant, Florence Kaye	June 11, 1964	1:52
3.	"Fort Lauderdale Chamber of Commerce"	Sid Tepper and Roy C. Bennett	June 11, 1964	1:32
4.	"Startin' Tonight"	Lenore Rosenblatt, Victor Millrose	June 12, 1964	1:19
5.	"Wolf Call"	Bernie Baum, Bill Giant, Florence Kaye	June 12, 1964	1:26
6.	"Do Not Disturb"	Bernie Baum, Bill Giant, Florence Kaye	June 11, 1964	1:52

Side two
No.	Title	Writer(s)	Recording date	Length
1.	"Cross My Heart and Hope to Die"	Ben Weisman and Sid Wayne	June 11, 1964	1:55
2.	"The Meanest Girl in Town"	Joy Byers	June 10, 1964	1:55
3.	"Do the Clam"	Ben Weisman, Dolores Fuller, Sid Wayne	June 12, 1964	3:20
4.	"Puppet on a String"	Sid Tepper and Roy C. Bennett	June 10, 1964	2:39
5.	"I've Got to Find My Baby"	Joy Byers	June 11, 1964	1:35
6.	"You'll Be Gone" (bonus Track)	Elvis Presley, Charlie Hodge, Red West	March 18, 1962	2:23

=== Follow That Dream reissue (2003) ===
Original album
No.	Title	Length
1.	"Girl Happy"	2:07
2.	"Spring Fever"	1:51
3.	"Fort Lauderdale Chamber of Commerce"	1:31
4.	"Startin Tonight"	1:28
5.	"Wolf Call"	1:57
6.	"Do Not Disturb"	1:57
7.	"Cross My Heart and Hope to Die"	1:52
8.	"The Meanest Girl in Town"	1:55
9.	"Do the Clam"	3:19
10.	"Puppet on a String"	2:39
11.	"I've Got to Find My Baby"	1:29
12.	"You'll Be Gone" (bonus track)	2:20

New bonus tracks
No.	Title	Length
13.	"Puppet on a String" (takes 5, 6, 7)	3:45
14.	"The Meanest Girl in Town" (takes 7, 8, 9)	3:52
15.	"Spring Fever" (take 4)	1:55
16.	"Do Not Disturb" (takes 24, 25, 26, 27)	6:05
17.	"Cross My Heart and Hope to Die" (take 6)	2:02
18.	"Girl Happy" (takes 1, 2, 3, 4)	7:03
19.	"Puppet on a String" (take 10)	2:47
20.	"Spring Fever" (takes 18, 19, 21)	3:47
21.	"The Meanest Girl in Town" (take 11)	2:24
22.	"Do Not Disturb" (take 35)	2:04
23.	"Cross My Heart and Hope to Die" (takes 9, 10, 11)	4:00
24.	"Girl Happy" (take 13 and take 4 of ending)	3:08
Total length:		42:52

== Personnel ==
- Elvis Presley – vocals
- The Jordanaires – backing vocals
- The Jubilee Four – backing vocals (on "Do the Clam" and "Wolf Call")
- The Carole Lombard Trio – backing vocals (on "Do the Clam" and "Wolf Call")
- Boots Randolph – saxophone
- Scotty Moore – electric rhythm guitar
- Tommy Tedesco – electric lead guitar

- Tiny Timbrell – acoustic guitar
- Floyd Cramer – piano
- Bob Moore – double bass
- D. J. Fontana – drums
- Buddy Harman – drums, percussion
- Frank Carlson – drums

== Charts ==
Year	Chart	Position
1965	Billboard Pop Albums	8

== Certifications ==
Region	Certification	Certified units/sales
United States (RIAA)	Gold	500,000^{^}
^{^} Shipments figures based on certification alone.
