= List of Billboard Easy Listening number ones of 1965 =

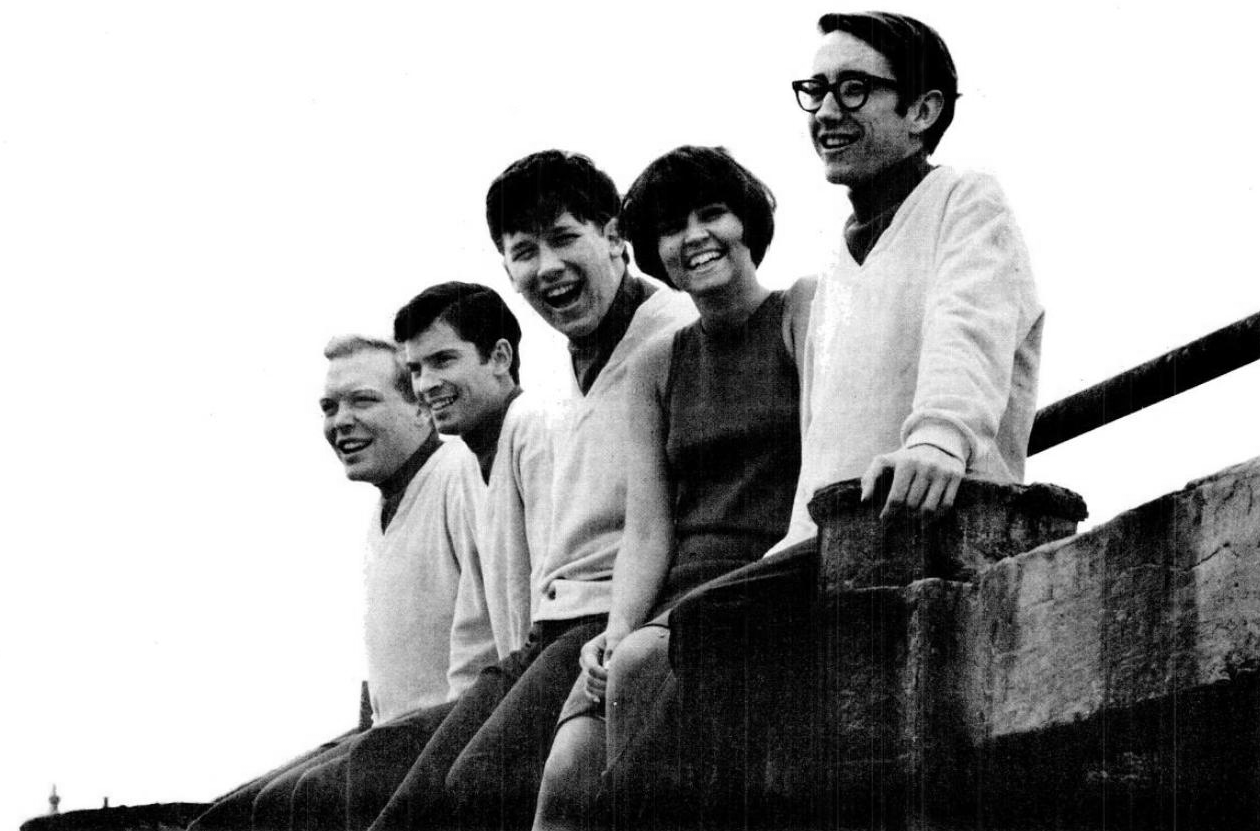
We Five spent five weeks at number one with their version of "You Were on My Mind".

In 1965, Billboard magazine published a chart ranking the top-performing songs in the United States which were considered to be "easy listening" or "middle of the road"; the chart underwent a significant change during the year. Since its first publication in 1961, the listing had been compiled by simply extracting from the magazine's pop music chart, the Hot 100, those songs which the magazine's staff deemed to be of an appropriate style and ranking them according to their placings on the Hot 100. At the start of 1965, the chart used this methodology and was published under the title Middle-Road Singles. The title changed to Pop-Standard Singles in the issue of Billboard dated May 1. With effect from the issue dated June 5, 1965, however, the magazine dropped the Pop-Standard listing and began compiling an Easy Listening top 40 wholly independent of the Hot 100, based on playlists submitted by easy listening radio stations and sales reports submitted by stores. At the time, Billboard promoted the revamped listing as a brand new chart, with each song in the June 5 issue shown as being in its first week on the chart, but the magazine now regards the charts before and after the methodology change as one unbroken lineage. The chart has undergone various name changes and since 1996 has been published under the title Adult Contemporary.

On the first chart of 1965, the number one song was "The Wedding" by the British singer Julie Rogers, which held the top spot for three weeks before being replaced by another British act, Chad & Jeremy, with their single "Willow Weep for Me". The longest unbroken run at number one during 1965 was ten weeks, achieved by Roger Miller with "King of the Road" between February and April. The highest total number of weeks achieved by an artist was the 12 weeks which Elvis Presley spent in the top spot between May and October with "Crying in the Chapel", "(Such an) Easy Question" and "I'm Yours". Presley was the only artist with more than one Easy Listening number one during the year, although all three of his chart-toppers were older songs which were not released as singles until 1965. "Crying in the Chapel", which had been recorded in 1960 but never previously released, held the number one position on the first chart compiled under the new methodology in June.

The final number one of the year was "Make the World Go Away" by Eddy Arnold. Like "King of the Road" earlier in the year, Arnold's song also reached the top position on Billboard's Hot Country Singles chart. None of 1965's Easy Listening number ones topped the Hot 100, which at the time was largely dominated by the rock and roll-influenced style of acts from the United Kingdom associated with the so-called British Invasion, such as the Beatles and the Rolling Stones. "You're Nobody till Somebody Loves You" by Dean Martin and "Have You Looked into Your Heart" by Jerry Vale, consecutive number ones on the Middle-Road Singles chart in January and February, both peaked outside the top 20 of the Hot 100.

== Chart history ==
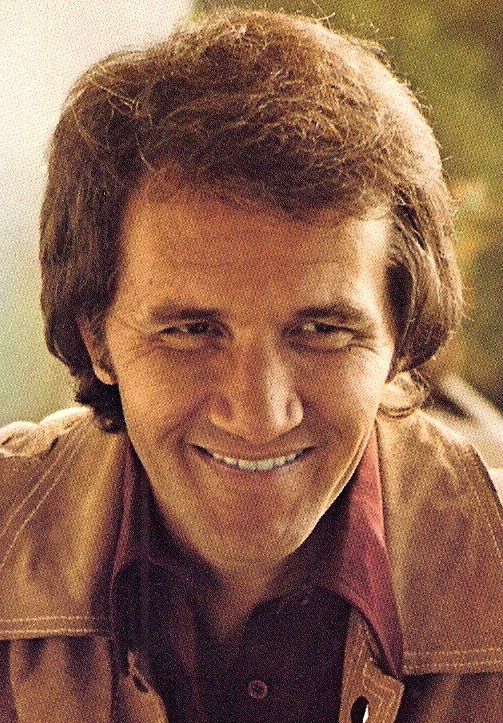
Roger Miller spent ten consecutive weeks at number one with "King of the Road".

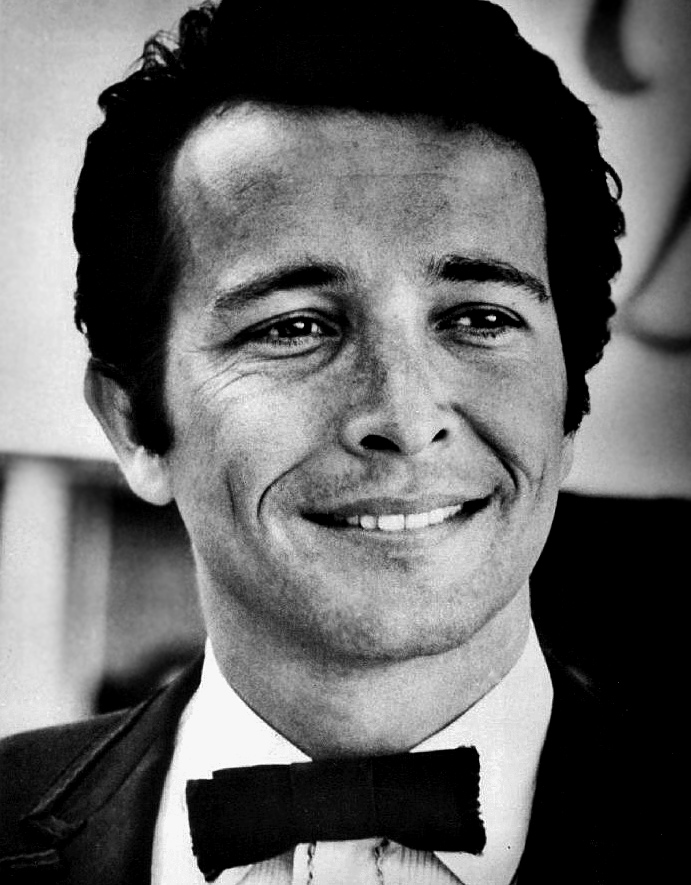
"A Taste of Honey" was a chart-topper for Herb Alpert.

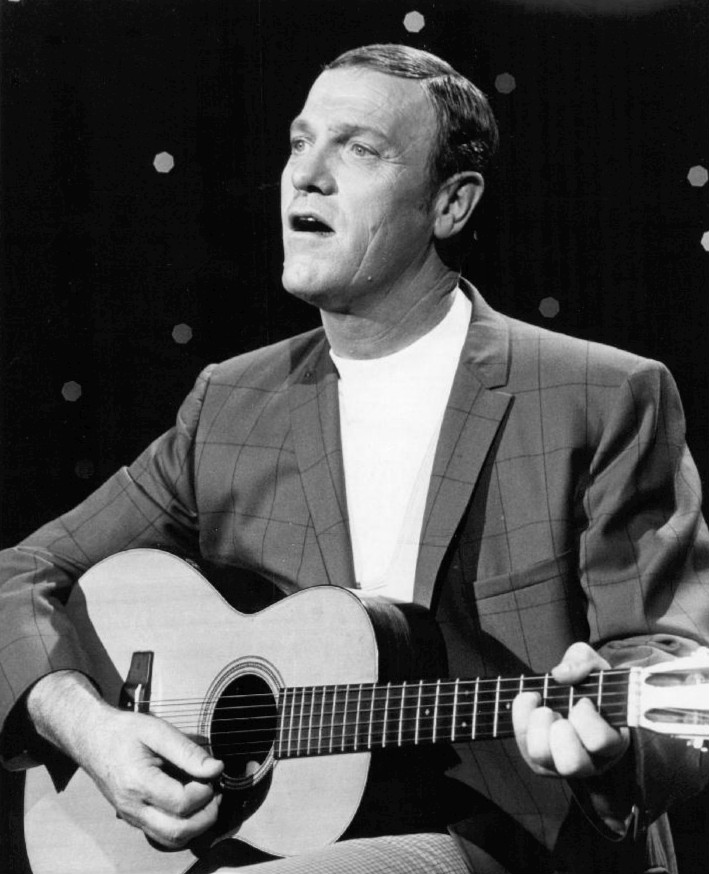
Eddy Arnold ended the year at number one.

Key
†	Indicates number one on Billboard's year-end easy listening chart for 1965

Chart history
Issue date	Title	Artist(s)	Ref.
January 2	"The Wedding"	Julie Rogers	
January 9	"The Wedding"	Julie Rogers	
January 16	"The Wedding"	Julie Rogers	
January 23	"Willow Weep for Me"	Chad & Jeremy	
January 30	"You're Nobody till Somebody Loves You"	Dean Martin	
February 6	"Have You Looked into Your Heart"	Jerry Vale	
February 13	"King of the Road"	Roger Miller	
February 20	"King of the Road"	Roger Miller	
February 27	"King of the Road"	Roger Miller	
March 6	"King of the Road"	Roger Miller	
March 13	"King of the Road"	Roger Miller	
March 20	"King of the Road"	Roger Miller	
March 27	"King of the Road"	Roger Miller	
April 3	"King of the Road"	Roger Miller	
April 10	"King of the Road"	Roger Miller	
April 17	"King of the Road"	Roger Miller	
April 24	"The Race Is On"	Jack Jones	
May 1	"Cast Your Fate to the Wind"	Sounds Orchestral	
May 8	"Cast Your Fate to the Wind"	Sounds Orchestral	
May 15	"Cast Your Fate to the Wind"	Sounds Orchestral	
May 22	"Crying in the Chapel"	Elvis Presley	
May 29	"Crying in the Chapel"	Elvis Presley	
June 5	"Crying in the Chapel"	Elvis Presley	
June 12	"Crying in the Chapel"	Elvis Presley	
June 19	"Crying in the Chapel"	Elvis Presley	
June 26	"Crying in the Chapel"	Elvis Presley	
July 3	"Crying in the Chapel"	Elvis Presley	
July 10	"A Walk in the Black Forest"	Horst Jankowski	
July 17	"A Walk in the Black Forest"	Horst Jankowski	
July 24	"(Such an) Easy Question"	Elvis Presley	
July 31	"(Such an) Easy Question"	Elvis Presley	
August 7	"Save Your Heart for Me"	Gary Lewis & the Playboys	
August 14	"Save Your Heart for Me"	Gary Lewis & the Playboys	
August 21	"Save Your Heart for Me"	Gary Lewis & the Playboys	
August 28	"Hold Me, Thrill Me, Kiss Me"	Mel Carter	
September 4	"You Were on My Mind" †	We Five	
September 11	"You Were on My Mind" †	We Five	
September 18	"You Were on My Mind" †	We Five	
September 25	"You Were on My Mind" †	We Five	
October 2	"You Were on My Mind" †	We Five	
October 9	"I'm Yours"	Elvis Presley	
October 16	"I'm Yours"	Elvis Presley	
October 23	"I'm Yours"	Elvis Presley	
October 30	"A Taste of Honey"	Herb Alpert & the Tijuana Brass	
November 6	"A Taste of Honey"	Herb Alpert & the Tijuana Brass	
November 13	"A Taste of Honey"	Herb Alpert & the Tijuana Brass	
November 20	"A Taste of Honey"	Herb Alpert & the Tijuana Brass	
November 27	"A Taste of Honey"	Herb Alpert & the Tijuana Brass	
December 4	"Make the World Go Away"	Eddy Arnold	
December 11	"Make the World Go Away"	Eddy Arnold	
December 18	"Make the World Go Away"	Eddy Arnold	
December 25	"Make the World Go Away"	Eddy Arnold	

== See also ==
- 1965 in music
- List of artists who reached number one on the U.S. Adult Contemporary chart
