= Juan Prieto =

Juan Prieto may refer to:

- Juan Antonio Espinoza Prieto, (1926-2011), Chilean actor
- Juan António Prieto (fl. 1992–2000), Spanish paralympic runner
- Juan Carlos Prieto (fl. 1992), Spanish paralympic high jumper

== See also ==
- Antonio Prieto (disambiguation)
