= Steppin' Out of Line =

Song by Elvis Presley

from the album Pot Luck
- Genre: Rock and roll
- Length: 1:54
- Songwriter(s): Fred Wise, Ben Weisman, Dolores Fuller

Steppin' Out of Line is a song by Elvis Presley. It was recorded for Presley's 1961 film "Blue Hawaii". However, the song was cut from the finished film and did not appear on the film's soundtrack. Instead, "Steppin' Out of Line" was used as track 5 on Presley's Pot Luck album. In 1997, the “Blue Hawaii” soundtrack was re-released with several bonus tracks, including "Steppin' Out of Line".
