= Antonio Prieto =

Antonio Prieto may refer to:

- Antonio Prieto (artist) (1912–1967), California ceramic artist
- Antonio Prieto (Chilean singer) (1926-–2011), Chilean actor and singer
- Antonio Prieto (runner) (born 1958), Spanish long-distance runner
- Antonio Prieto (Spanish actor) (1905–1965), Spanish actor
- Antonio Prieto (tennis) (born 1973), Brazilian tennis player

== See also ==
- Juan António Prieto, Spanish Paralympic athlete
