= The Miami Showband =

Irish showband

- Origin: Dublin, Ireland
- Genres: Pop; country; glam rock; pop rock; Irish showband
- Years active: 1962–1975; 1976–1982; Intermittent later reunions until 2015
- Labels: Piccadilly; Pye; Mint
- Past members: Jimmy Harte; Dickie Rock; Fran O'Toole; Tony Geraghty; Brian McCoy; Martin Phelan; Murty Quinn; Clem Quinn; Denis Murray; Paul Ashford; Des McAlea; Pat McCarthy; Danny Ellis; Martin Branigan; Billy Mac; Mick Roche; Dave Monks; Johnny Brown; Frankie Simon; Johnny Simon; Dave Monks; Tony Geraghty; Stephen Travers; Des Flaherty; Noel Ryan
- Website: themiamishowband.com

The Miami Showband were an Irish showband in the 1960s and 1970s led firstly in 1962 by singer Jimmy Harte, followed by Dickie Rock and later by Fran O'Toole. They had seven number-one records on the Irish singles chart.

The band's career was interrupted at the height of their fame when three members – Fran O'Toole, Tony Geraghty, and Brian McCoy – were murdered in 1975 by loyalist terrorists, in a botched attack initially intended to convince the British government that the band had been involved in smuggling explosives across the Irish border.

The band reformed in 1976 but disbanded in 1982, later reuniting and reforming. The Miami Showband played their final gig in 2015.

== Career ==
The band was established in Dublin in 1962 by impresario Tom Doherty. He recruited an existing group, the Downbeats Quartet, comprising Joe Tyrell (piano), Tony Bogan (drums), Clem Quinn (guitar), and Martin Phelan (saxophone), and augmented them with singer Jimmy Harte who at the time was a member of The Ambassadors Showband in Dublin, joined trumpeter Tommy O'Rourke, trombonist and vocalist Murty Quinn, and bass player Denis Murray. The group's first engagement was at the Palm Beach Ballroom in Portmarnock, and as the town of Palm Beach in Florida is near to Miami, they were named the Miami Showband. They rapidly became one of the top showbands in the country. For family reasons, and to finish his education in early 1963 Jimmy left the Miami, by now a very successful band, and a replacement, Dickie Rock (at the time, a member of another group, the Melochords) was found. In December 1963 the Miami had their first single, a version of the Elvis Presley album track "There's Always Me" reached number one in the Irish charts They had four further number one hits over the next two years: "I'm Yours" and "From the Candy Store on the Corner" (both 1964), and "Every Step of the Way" and "Wishing It Was You" (both 1965). (Note: "Every Step of the Way" was the first song by an Irish artist to go straight in as a number-one single in the Irish charts.)

In 1966, the band were chosen to sing Ireland's entry in the Eurovision Song Contest, and their song "Come Back to Stay" also reached the top of the charts. They also appeared on British TV, on Sunday Night at the London Palladium and Thank Your Lucky Stars.

In 1967, four members of the band—Murty Quinn, Tommy O'Rourke, Denis Murray and Martin Phelan—split away to form their own group, The Sands. They were replaced by songwriter and singer Fran O'Toole, Paul Ashford, Pat McCarthy, Des Lee (born Des McAlea) and Brian McCoy. The group's final number one came with "Simon Says" (a version of the 1910 Fruitgum Company song) in 1968. McCarthy and Tony Bogan later left and were replaced by Danny Ellis and Martin Brannigan. The group released an album, The Wind Will Change Tomorrow, in 1970, and in the early 1970s played a residency in Las Vegas and performed at Carnegie Hall.

=== The Troubles ===
Popular with both Catholics and Protestants, the Miami Showband regularly played to audiences on both sides of the Irish border throughout the Troubles and were known to some as the "Irish Beatles". The band's saxophonist, Des Lee, would later recollect: "We entertained everybody. Didn't matter what colour, what creed, or where we were playing, whether it was north or south at that terrible time in Northern Ireland. We looked upon it as giving two hours of fun to people to get away from the Troubles."

In 1972, the group had another major change, when Dickie Rock left to front his own band. He was initially replaced in the Miami Showband at first by brothers Frankie and Johnny Simon and then, briefly, by Billy Mac (born Billy MacDonald). Following the sacking of Mick Roche (Billy Mac's replacement) in 1974, Fran O'Toole fronted the band, the group often being billed as "Fran O'Toole and the Miami". The album Miami Country was released in 1973. Line-up changes continued, and by 1975 the last remaining member of the original line-up, Clem Quinn, had left. The group then comprised Des Lee, Brian McCoy, Tony Geraghty, Fran O'Toole, Steve Travers and Ray Millar. Four of the band hailed from Northern Ireland: two of whom were Catholic; and two Protestant.

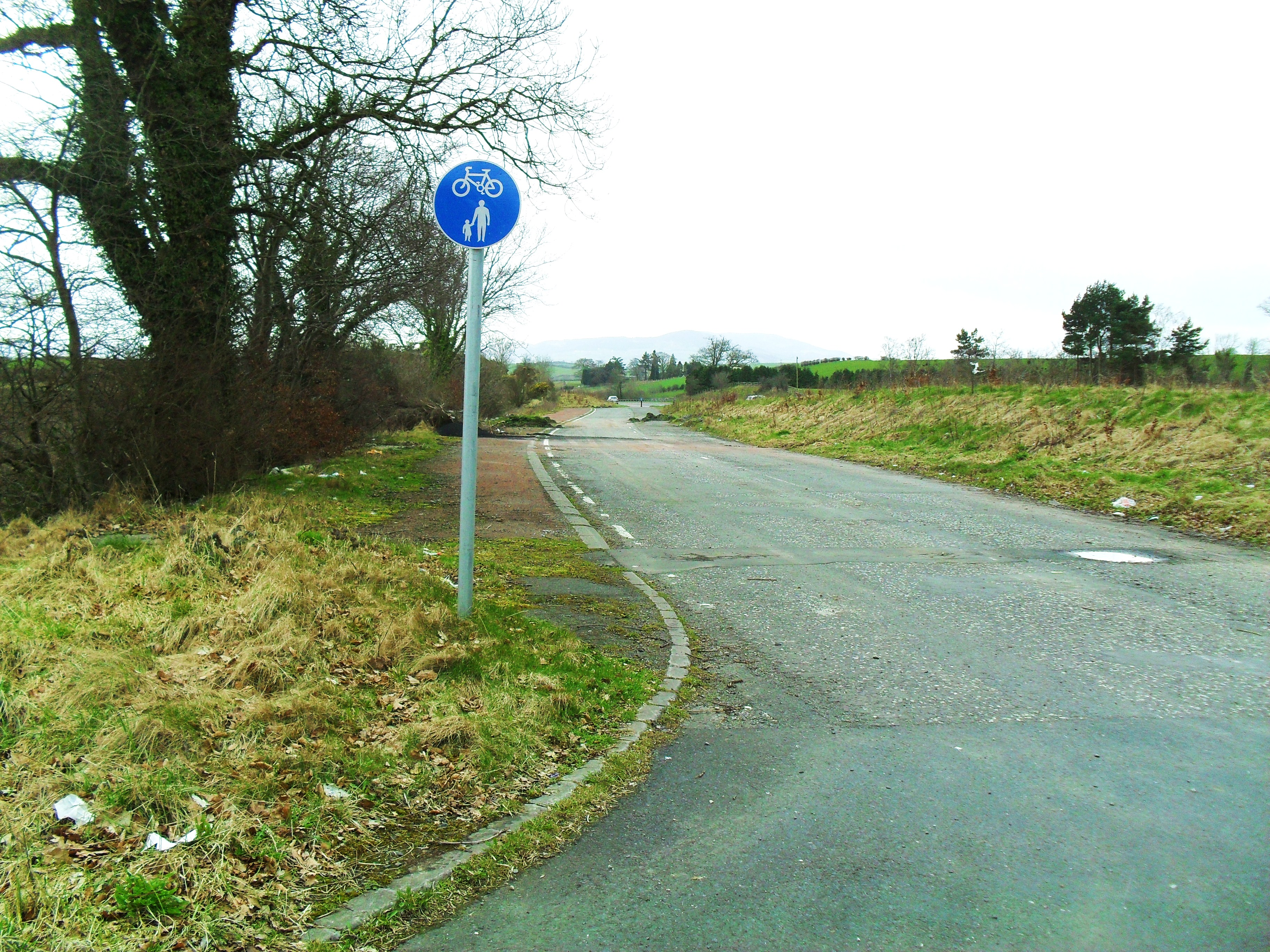
The lay-by in the townland of Buskhill where the Miami Showband were ordered to stop by members of the Ulster Volunteer Force.

On 30 July 1975, the Miami Showband performed a gig at the Castle Ballroom in Banbridge, County Down, Northern Ireland. The band played live for an estimated 450 people before drummer Ray Millar left to spend the evening with his parents in Antrim. The remaining five members of the band travelled south by minibus back to Dublin.

== Massacre ==
At approximately 2:30 a.m. on 31 July 1975, the band were stopped at a bogus military checkpoint by gunmen dressed in British Army uniform in the townland of Buskhill, outside of Newry. All were ordered to exit the vehicle and line up by the roadside, facing away from the vehicle with their hands on their heads as individuals they initially believed were members of the Ulster Defence Regiment searched their van for explosives or weaponry. In efforts to allay any fears or suspicions, one of these individuals jokingly asked the band members, "Which one of you is Dickie Rock?" Upon hearing this, one of the Protestant band members, Brian McCoy, nudged bassist Stephen Travers' elbow with his own, reassuring him all was well and of his belief the individuals were members of the British Army.

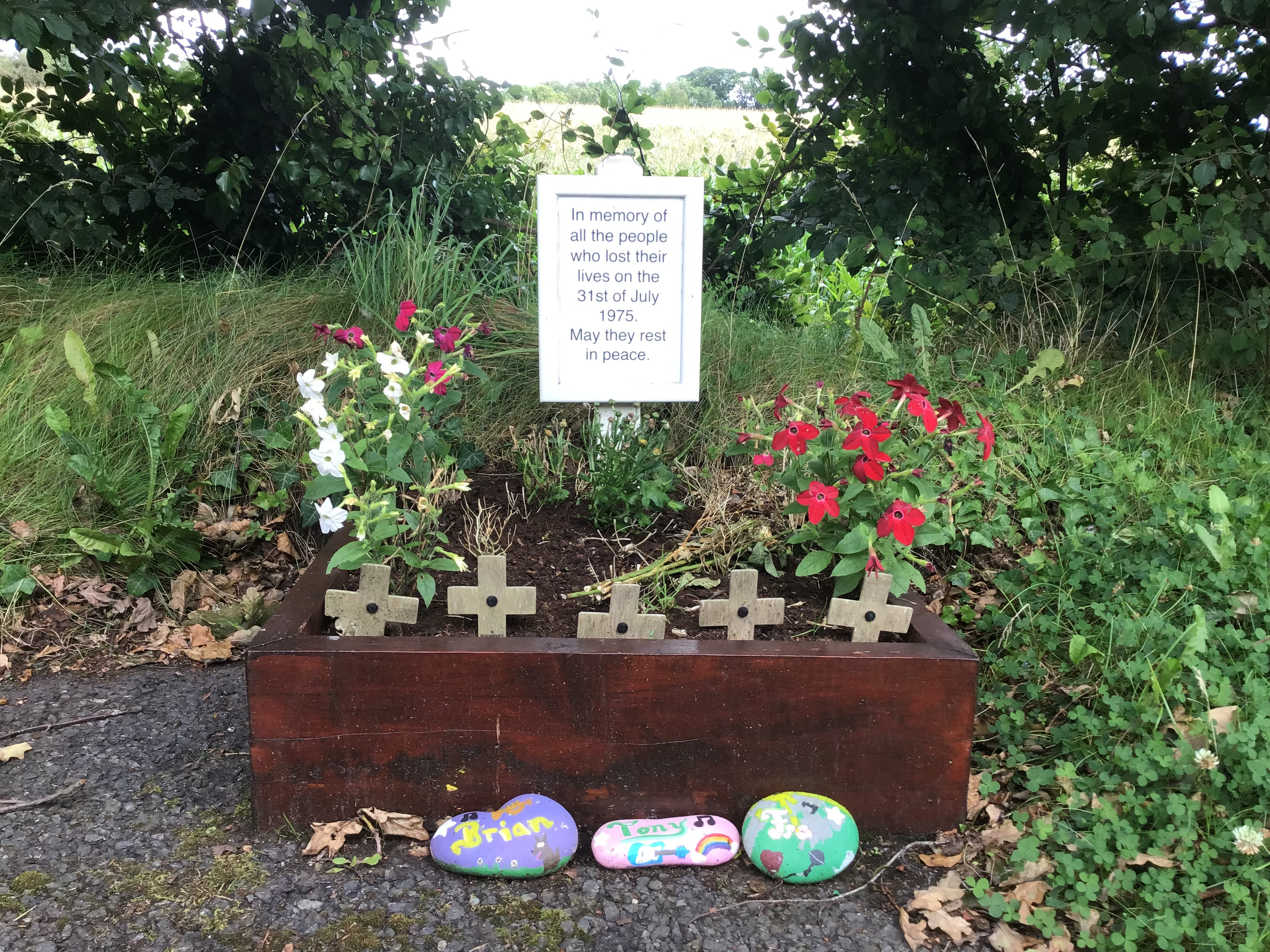
The small memorial at the scene of the murders.

Unbeknownst to the band members, the individuals were actually members of a loyalist paramilitary group, the Ulster Volunteer Force (UVF). Two gunmen, Harris Boyle and Wesley Somerville, attempted to hide a time bomb on the minibus, with the intention for the device to explode upon the band's reaching the Republic of Ireland. However, the device exploded prematurely, killing both Boyle and Somerville and hurling the band's saxophonist, Des Lee, into a ditch.

The remaining gunmen then opened fire on the band members, killing O'Toole (age 29), McCoy (age 32), and Geraghty (age 24), and wounding Travers. Lee escaped any further injury by feigning death. Two serving Ulster Defence Regiment soldiers and one former UDR soldier later received life sentences after having been found guilty of murder.

== Reformation ==
The year after the killings, the Miami Showband regrouped and continued to perform. Des Lee fronted the band until leaving in 1978, later moving to South Africa. The group remained active until 1982, led by Charlie Chapman. They then split up and their management formed a new band, The New Miami, fronted by Caroline Allen. Another new band using the Miami name was formed in 1996, featuring Gerry Brown, brother of the singer Dana.

In August 2005, Lee, Travers and Millar reunited on stage at a Miami Showband Memorial Concert in Dublin. Following that, a tour was organised in 2008 with the trio being augmented by Gerry Brown, Johnny Fean (formerly of the band Horslips), and Barry Woods.

The Miami Showband played their final concert on 21 August 2015. The venue for this concert was a location in Banbridge, close to the Castle Ballroom, where the band had played on the evening prior to the UVF ambush.

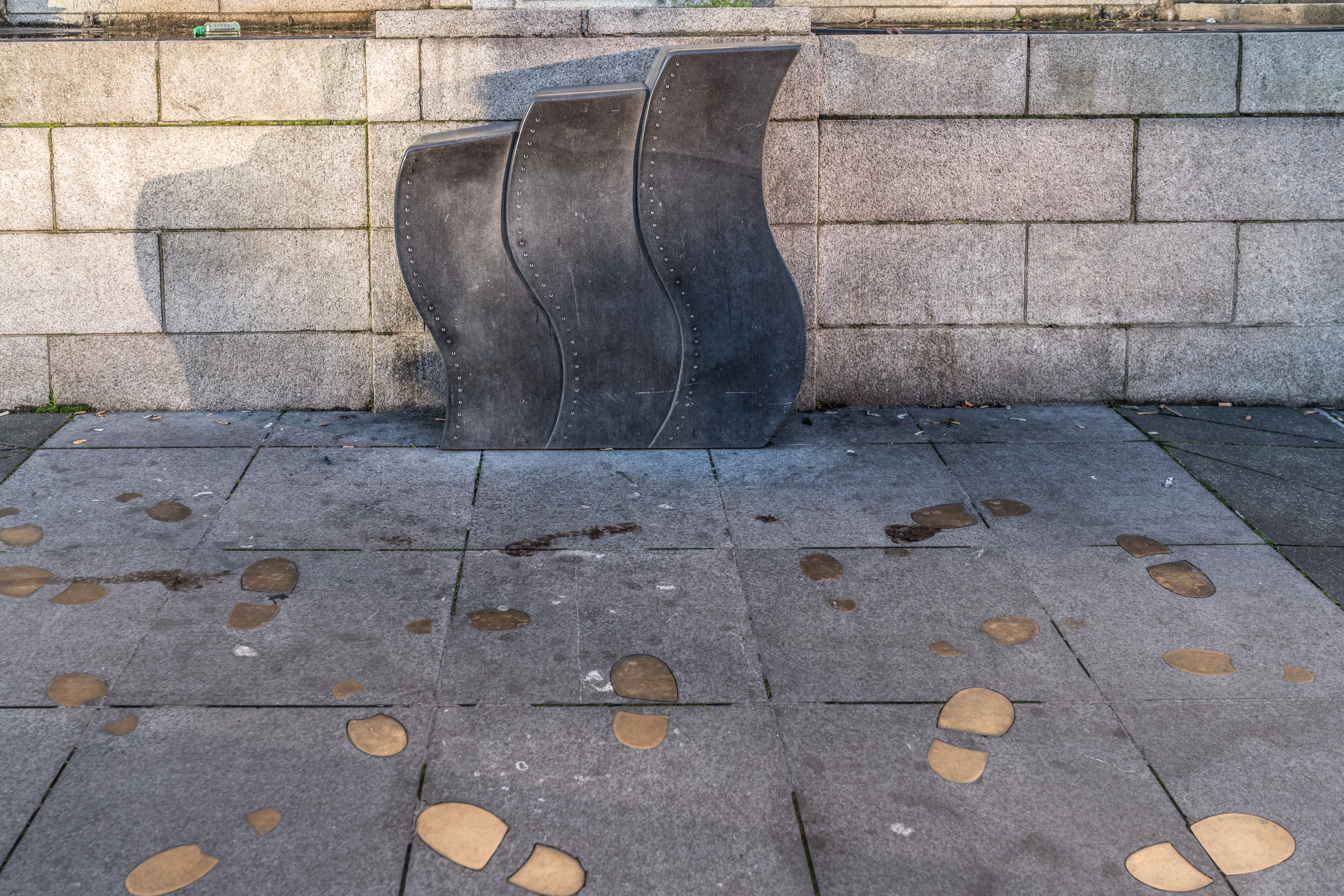
Memorial to the three dead band members at Parnell Square, Dublin

In an interview granted to the press prior to this gig, saxophonist Des Lea stated: "It will be a very fitting close in Banbridge; it's going to be a very emotional evening as we're back in the town where the massacre occurred. It's emotional and heart-wrenching, but I know Fran, Brian and Tony would be very proud."

== Aftermath ==
A monument at Parnell Square North, Dublin, dedicated to the dead Miami Showband members, was unveiled at a ceremony on 10 December 2007 attended by Lee and Travers. The Taoiseach, Bertie Ahern, said of O'Toole, McCoy and Geraghty:

Their murder was an atrocity which had such a profound impact on everyone on this island. It is remembered with sadness to this very day.... We remember the affection in which they were held by people the length and breadth of Ireland. Their popularity crossed all boundaries and all traditions. They simply wanted to entertain everyone who had a love of music. At a dark time, they were a shining light for so many.

Tom Doherty died on 21 April 2009. Former band members Martin Phelan and Paul Ashford (born 1950, Bray, County Wicklow) died in 2010 and 2011 respectively.

A stamp was issued on 22 September 2010 by An Post commemorating the Miami Showband. This was one of a series of four stamps issued in Ireland to celebrate the "golden age" of the Irish showband scene from the 1950s to the 1970s. The 55-cent stamp was designed with a 1967 publicity photograph of the band, fronted by Dickie Rock. Two of the band members killed in the massacre at Bushkill, Fran O'Toole and Brian McCoy, are also featured.

== Singles discography (partial list) ==
- Nov-1963^{a} – "There's Always Me" / "Boys" (No. 1)
- Mar-1964^{a} – "I'm Yours" / "Please Don't Drag That String Around" (No. 1)
- Oct-1964^{a} – "From the Candy Store on the Corner" / "Twenty Flight Rock" (No. 1)
- Dec-1964^{a} – "Just for Old Time's Sake" / "Me Not You" (No. 2)
- Jan-1965^{a} – "Round and Round" / "Shake a Little Baby" (No. 2)
- May-1965^{a} – "Every Step of the Way" / "Rock and Roll Music" (No. 1)
- Aug-1965^{a} – "(I Left My Heart) In San Francisco" / "One By One" (No. 4)
- Oct-1965^{a} – "Wishing It Was You" / "Georgie Porgie" (No. 1)
- Dec-1965^{b} – "Buck's Polka" / "O Sole Mio" (No. 8)
- Jan-1966^{c} – "One Kiss (For Old Time's Sake)" / "Someone Told Me" (No. 3)
- Feb-1966^{a} – "Come Back To Stay" / "Can't Make Up My Mind" (No. 1)
- Nov-1966^{a} – "Darling I Love You" / "Suspicion" (No. 4)
- Jan-1967^{a} – "When You Cry" / "To Whom It Concerns" (No. 7)
- Apr-1967^{c} – "There Goes My Everything" / "Make Believe" (No. 17)
- May-1967^{a} – "Baby I'm Your Man" / "Mairzy Doats And Dozy Doats" (No. 13)
- Jun-1968^{a} – "Simon Says" / "Somebody Else Is Taking My Place" (No. 1)
- Nov-1968^{a} – "Christmas Time and You" / "The Little Boy Santa Forgot" (No. 10)
- Apr-1969^{a} – "Emily" / "Waterfall" (No. 12)
- May-1969^{d} – "Goody Goody Gumdrops" / "Then I'll Count Again"
- Jul -1969^{a} – "The Wanderer" / "Uncle Tristian's Moonship"
- Nov-1969^{d} – "Jack and Jill" / "Rectify"
- Jul-1970^{a} – "When My Train Comes In" / "Day by Day" (No. 15)
- -1970^{a} – "Burning Bridges" / "Run to the Clown"
- May-1971^{a} – "My Heart Keeps Telling Me (I Love Melanie So)" / "We Did It Together" (No. 7)
- Oct-1971^{a} – "Cathedral in the Pines" / "Go" (No. 15)
- Nov-1971^{e} – "Shake a Hand" / "My Pledge of Love"
- Jan-1972^{a} – "Mini Monster E.P.", (No. 9) ("Till" / "Just for Old Times Sake" / "Georgie Porgie" / "From the Candy Store on the Corner")
- Jul-1972^{a} – "Lot 109" / "Teardrop on Teardrop"
- Jul-1972^{e} – "Loco Porti (Crazy for You)" / "The Writing on the Wall" (No. 19)
- Dec-1972^{a} – "Lollipops Lace and Lipstick" / "When You Cry"
- Mar-1973^{e} – "Captain Zero" / "Bye-Bye"
- Jul-1974^{f} – "There Won't Be Anymore" / "It Never Rains in Southern California"
- Sep-1974^{e} – "Clap Your Hands And Stomp Your Feet" / "Drift Away" (No. 8)
- Sep-1975^{e} – "Love Is" / "Tell Me Again" (No. 3)
- Oct-1976^{d} – "Hold on to Love" / "Angel of Love" (No. 1)
- Jun-1977^{e} – "Out There Singing" / "Can't You Understand" (No. 7)
- -1978 – "Don't Put the Boy Down"
- Aug-1978 – "I Like It Like That" / "My Life Is Rock and Roll"
- May-1979 – "Too Much Is Going On" / "Miami Melody"
- -1979 – "Reelin' and Rockin' with Susie" / "Clap Your Hands, Stomp Your Feet"
- -1980 – "Words and Music" / "Save the Last Dance for Me"

^{a} = Features Dickie Rock ^{b} – Features Clem Quinn ^{c} – Features Murty Quinn ^{d} – Features Des Lee ^{e} – Features Fran O'Toole ^{f} – Features Brian McCoy

== See also ==
- Irish showband
- Music of Ireland
- The Troubles

== Cited works and further reading ==
- McLaughlin, Noel; McLoone, Martin (2012). Rock and Popular Music in Ireland Before and After U2. Newbridge, County Kildare: Irish Academic Press. ISBN 978-0-716-53076-3.
- Travers, Stephen; Fetherstonhaugh, Neil (2008). The Miami Showband Massacre: A Survivor's Search for the Truth. Dublin: Hachette Publishing Ireland. ISBN 978-0-340-93794-5.
