= The Meanest Girl in Town =

Song by Elvis Presley
- Songwriter: Joy Byers

" The Meanest Girl in Town", also known as "Yeah, She's Evil!" is a rock and roll song written by Joy Byers, which was recorded in June 1964 by both Elvis Presley, as "The Meanest Girl in Town" for the soundtrack to the 1965 film release Girl Happy, and by Bill Haley & His Comets as "Yeah, She's Evil!" for a Decca Records single release.

Haley's recording was released during the summer of 1964, predating Presley's release (on the soundtrack to Girl Happy), although Presley actually recorded his version several days before Haley: on June 10, 1964, for Presley, versus June 16, 1964 for Bill Haley & His Comets.

Haley's recording (as the B-side to a version of Jim Lowe's "Green Door") was a one-off attempt at reestablishing his relationship with Decca, with whom his previous contract had ended in the fall of 1959. The single did not, however, make the U.S. charts. Presley's rendition was not released in the U.S. on a single, but the Girl Happy soundtrack album was a Top 10 Billboard hit in the U.S.

== Releases ==
As The Meanest Girl in Town

- Elvis Presley, Girl Happy (soundtrack album), RCA Victor LSP/LPM 3338, March 1965.

As Yeah, She's Evil!

- Bill Haley & His Comets, single The Green Door/Yeah, She's Evil!, Decca Records 31650, July 27, 1964
