= You'll Be Gone =

- 1965 U.S. RCA Victor 45 picture sleeve, 47-8500

Single by Elvis Presley

from the album Girl Happy
- A-side: "Do the Clam"
- Released: February 9, 1965
- Recorded: March 18, 1962
- Genre: Pop; rock and roll
- Length: 2:20
- Label: RCA Victor
- Songwriters: Elvis Presley; Red West; Charlie Hodge

Elvis Presley singles chronology
"Blue Christmas" (1965)	"Do the Clam" / "You'll Be Gone" (1965)	"Crying in the Chapel" (1965)

"You'll Be Gone" is a song recorded by Elvis Presley and published by Elvis Presley Music and released in 1965 on the Girl Happy soundtrack album and as a 45 single. The song was recorded in 1962 and was one of very few which Presley was involved in writing; his co-writers were his bodyguard Red West and Charlie Hodge. The other song that Elvis Presley composed was "That's Someone You Never Forget" in 1961 with Red West, which was on the Pot Luck LP released in 1962. The song was recorded on Sunday, March 18, 1962, at RCA Studio B in Nashville, Tennessee.

== Composition history ==
Red West recounted that "You'll Be Gone" was written after a suggestion or idea made by Elvis to write new lyrics for Cole Porter's 1935 classic song "Begin the Beguine", from the musical Jubilee: "Elvis recorded 'It's Now Or Never' and he wanted to take another old standard that was a great song and change the lyrics. ... He said 'I like the song "Begin the Beguine". I like the melody but I'd like to put new lyrics on it.'" The beguine had been a dance popular in Martinique and Guadeloupe in the 1930s. When Cole Porter denied permission to alter the lyrics, Elvis, West, and Charlie Hodge worked on creating new lyrics and new music for a song that would be entitled "You'll Be Gone". The song was replete with Latin rhythms and classical guitar passages.

In the liner notes to the CD Elvis by the Presleys (2005) Ernst Jorgensen wrote: "When Priscilla came to visit Elvis in the U.S. in the spring of 1962, Elvis proudly played her the new recordings he had just made in Nashville. One of these was 'You'll Be Gone,' a song that he had written himself with his good friends Red West and Charlie Hodge. To his deep frustration, Priscilla remarked that she liked his rock 'n' roll recordings better. Elvis had a fit, Priscilla was devastated, and Elvis never tried to write a song again."

Elvis Presley's wife Priscilla noted in the liner notes to the CD Elvis by the Presleys (2005): "The reason we've included it is because it's the last time Elvis ever wrote a song."

1965 U.S. RCA Victor 45 single release, 47–8500.

== Chart history ==
"You'll Be Gone" was released as an RCA Victor 45 picture sleeve single on February 9, 1965, as the B side of "Do the Clam", as RCA Victor 47–8500. The Jordanaires provided the background vocals. "You'll Be Gone" charted at no. 121 on Billboard. In Canada, "You'll Be Gone" reached no. 16 on the singles chart as a double A side with "Do the Clam" in February, 1965 in a six-week chart run. The A side "Do the Clam" reached no. 21 on Billboard Hot 100 singles chart and remained on the chart for 8 weeks. The song was also released as a 7-inch 45 single by RCA (Teldec), 47–9686, in Germany in 1965 backed with "Blue River".

The single was also released in the UK, Australia, New Zealand, France, Japan, Greece, Egypt, South Africa, Peru, the Philippines, Turkey, and Israel. In France, the single was released as a picture sleeve 45 as RCA Victor 49801 in 1971.

== Appearances on albums ==
The song appeared on the following albums:

- as a bonus track on the 1965 Girl Happy soundtrack album
- the RCA 1999 CD reissue of the 1962 Pot Luck album as a bonus track
- the 1992 From Nashville to Memphis: The Essential 60s Masters album
- the 2003 FTD reissue of the Girl Happy soundtrack album
- the 2007 Pot Luck with Elvis, 2 CD FTD Special Edition collection
- the 2010 FTD/BMG Nashville Outtakes: 1961-1964 collection, Take 1
- the 2005 Elvis by the Presleys soundtrack album as alternate take 2.
- The Complete Elvis Presley Masters, Legacy/RCA, 2010
- Original Album Classics, RCA/Sony Music, 2012
- The Perfect Elvis Presley Collection, Sony Music, 2012
- The Movie Soundtracks: 20 Original Albums, RCA, 2014
- Girl Happy FTD LP Set, FTD, 2025, takes 1 and 4

== Personnel ==
- Elvis Presley – vocals
- Scotty Moore – guitar
- Harold Bradley – guitar
- Grady Martin – guitar, vibes
- Bob Moore – bass
- D.J. Fontana – drums
- Buddy Harman – drums
- Floyd Cramer – piano
- Boots Randolph – saxophone, vibes
- Millie Kirkham – vocals
- The Jordanaires – vocals

1965 sheet music cover. Elvis Presley Music.

== Cover versions ==
English singer Morrissey released a live version of the song as the B-side to his 2017 single "Jacky's Only Happy When She's Up on the Stage". It was later included on the 2018 deluxe edition of the album Low in High School.

== Sources ==
- Jorgensen, Ernst. Elvis Presley, A Life In Music. New York: St. Martin's Press, 1998; ISBN 0-312-18572-3
- Jorgensen, Ernst. Elvis by the Presleys. Liner Notes. BMG Heritage, 2005.
- Presley, Priscilla. Elvis by the Presleys. Liner Notes. BMG Heritage, 2005.
- Hopkins, Jerry. Elvis: A Biography. NY: Simon and Schuster, 1971.
- Victor, Adam. The Elvis Encyclopedia. Overlook Hardcover, 2008.
