= Robert Beadell =

American composer (1925–1994)

Robert Beadell (June 18, 1925 – June 11, 1994) was an American composer.

== Life ==
After military service as a bandsman with the United States Marines during the Second World War, Beadell enrolled in the music program at Northwestern University in Evanston, Illinois, where his clarinet teacher, Dominick DiCaprio, encouraged him to study composition. At Northwestern his composition teachers were Robert Delaney and Anthony Donato, and he later studied with Leo Sowerby at the American Conservatory in Chicago, and with Darius Milhaud at Mills College. He first taught music theory and woodwinds at the Swinney Conservatory of Central Methodist College in Fayette, Missouri from 1950 to 1952, then joined the music faculty at the University of Nebraska in Lincoln, where he taught from 1954 to 1991. He died in 1994 aged 68.

== Works ==
Beadell is best known for his choral compositions and arrangements, and music for jazz ensemble. He also wrote two symphonies, five film scores, song cycles, piano pieces, chamber music, and five stage works: an operetta, The Kingdom of Caraway (1957), a musical, Out to the Wind (1979, based on Willa Cather's short story "Eric Hermannson's Soul"), and three operas, The Sweetwater Affair (1960, produced 1961), The Number of Fools (1965–66, rev. 1976), and Napoleon (1972, produced 1973). In 1967, he was commissioned by the Lincoln Symphony Orchestra Association for Mirage Flates, for chorus and orchestra, using texts by Mari Sandoz. It was premiered on November 21, 1967, by the Lincoln Symphony Orchestra and Chorus, conducted by Leo Kopp, in a concert of American music to mark the beginning of Kopp's 22nd year as conductor of the orchestra.

== Sources ==
- Feldman, Mary Ann. 1973. "Reports: US: Lincoln (Neb.)" [Review of the world premiere of Napoleon, February 2, 1973]. Opera News 37, no. 20 (March 24): 33–34.
- Kennedy, Margaret. 1995. "Vocal and Stage Works by Robert Beadell (1925–1994): Great Plains Composer". Paper presented at the 1995 Annual Conference of the Great Plains Regional Chapter of the College Music Society.
- Root, Scott L. 2004. An Examination of Robert Beadell’s (1925–1994) Four Major Works for the Lyric Stage. Studies in Theatre Arts 25. Ceredigion (UK) and Lewiston, NY: The Edwin Mellen Press. ISBN 0-7734-6531-6.
- Smith, Charles M. 2006. "'Eric Hermannson's Soul': Comparing and Contrasting Two Musical Adaptations of the Willa Cather Short Story (Robert Beadell, Libby Larsen)". Ph.D. Thesis. Lincoln: University of Nebraska.
