= I'm Yours (Elvis Presley song) =

1961 song by Elvis Presley

Single by Elvis Presley

from the album Pot Luck
- B-side: "(It's a) Long Lonely Highway"
- Released: August 10, 1965
- Recorded: June 25, 1961
- Studio: RCA Studio B, Nashville
- Genre: Rock and roll; pop
- Length: 2:21
- Label: RCA Victor
- Songwriters: Don Robertson; Hal Blair

Elvis Presley singles chronology
"(Such an) Easy Question" / "It Feels So Right" (1965)	"I'm Yours" / "(It's a) Long Lonely Highway" (1965)	"Puppet on a String" / "Wooden Heart" (1965)

"I'm Yours" is 1961 song recorded by Elvis Presley which appeared on the Pot Luck with Elvis album. The recording was released as a single in 1965. It was written by Don Robertson and Hal Blair.

== Background ==
The song was recorded by Elvis Presley on June 26, 1961, at RCA's Nashville, Tennessee studios, and released on the album Pot Luck with Elvis on June 5, 1962. It was published by Elvis Presley's publishing company Gladys Music, Inc. The single was also released in Canada, France, and New Zealand. The single was certified Gold in the U.S. by the RIAA in March 1992.

It was not released as a single until three years later when it was featured in Presley's film Tickle Me (1965). "I'm Yours" peaked at number 11 on the U.S. Billboard Hot 100 in October 1965. "I'm Yours" reached the top of the Billboard Easy Listening chart to become Presley's third consecutive number-one single on the chart.

== Weekly charts ==
Chart (1965)	Peak position
US Billboard Hot 100	11
US Adult Contemporary (Billboard)	1

== Dickie Rock cover ==
"I'm Yours"

Single by Dickie Rock and the Miamis
- Language: Spanish and English
- B-side: "Please Don't Drag That String Around"
- Released: April 1964
- Recorded: April 1964
- Genre: Country; showband
- Length: 3:45
- Label: Piccadilly
- Songwriters: Don Robertson; Hal Blair

Dickie Rock and the Miamis singles chronology
"There's Always Me" (1964)	"I'm Yours" (1964)	"From the Candy Store on the Corner" (1965)

A cover version was recorded by Dickie Rock and the Miamis in 1964.

The song reached Number 1 in the Irish Singles Chart on 29 May 1964, equal with Eileen Reid's "Fallen Star". It was one of three Irish number ones that Rock achieved in 1964.

== See also ==
- List of number-one adult contemporary singles of 1965 (U.S.)
- List of number-one singles of 1964 (Ireland)
