= List of number-one singles of 1964 (Ireland) =

This is a list of singles which reached number-one on the Irish Singles Chart in 1964.

Issue date	Song	Artist	Ref.
3 January	"There's Always Me"	Dickie Rock	
10 January	"There's Always Me"	Dickie Rock	
17 January	"There's Always Me"	Dickie Rock	
24 January	"There's Always Me"	Dickie Rock	
31 January	"Glad All Over"	The Dave Clark Five	
7 February	"Glad All Over"	The Dave Clark Five	
14 February	"Needles and Pins"	The Searchers	
21 February	"Needles and Pins"	The Searchers	
28 February	"Needles and Pins"	The Searchers	
6 March	"Needles and Pins"	The Searchers	
13 March	"Bits and Pieces"	The Dave Clark Five	
20 March	"Anyone Who Had a Heart"	Cilla Black	
27 March	"I Love You Because"	Jim Reeves	
3 April	"Can't Buy Me Love"	The Beatles	(Note: According to The Irish Charts, "Can't Buy Me Love" took the No. 1 spot on 30 March 1964.)
10 April	"Can't Buy Me Love"	The Beatles	
17 April	"Can't Buy Me Love"	The Beatles	
24 April	"Can't Buy Me Love"	The Beatles	
1 May	"Can't Buy Me Love"	The Beatles	
8 May	"A World Without Love"	Peter & Gordon	
15 May	"A World Without Love"	Peter & Gordon	
22 May	"Don't Throw Your Love Away"	The Searchers	
29 May (joint No. 1)	"Fallen Star"	Eileen Reid	
29 May (joint No. 1)	"I'm Yours"	Dickie Rock	
5 June	"My Boy Lollipop"	Millie	
12 June	"It's Over"	Roy Orbison	
19 June	"My Boy Lollipop"	Millie	
26 June	"It's Over"	Roy Orbison	
3 July	"Bless You"	Brendan Bowyer	
10 July	"Bless You"	Brendan Bowyer	
17 July	"It's Over"	Roy Orbison	
24 July	"I Won't Forget You"	Jim Reeves	
31 July	"I Won't Forget You"	Jim Reeves	
7 August	"A Hard Day's Night"	The Beatles	
14 August	"A Hard Day's Night"	The Beatles	
21 August	"A Hard Day's Night"	The Beatles	
28 August	"I Won't Forget You"	Jim Reeves	
4 September	"I Won't Forget You"	Jim Reeves	
11 September	"I Won't Forget You"	Jim Reeves	
18 September	"I Won't Forget You"	Jim Reeves	
25 September	"I Won't Forget You"	Jim Reeves	
2 October	"I Won't Forget You"	Jim Reeves	
9 October	"I Wouldn't Trade You for the World"	The Bachelors	
16 October	"I'm into Something Good"	Herman's Hermits	
23 October	"Oh, Pretty Woman"	Roy Orbison	
30 October	"From the Candy Store on the Corner to the Chapel on the Hill"	Dickie Rock	
6 November	"From the Candy Store on the Corner to the Chapel on the Hill"	Dickie Rock	
13 November	"From the Candy Store on the Corner to the Chapel on the Hill"	Dickie Rock	
20 November	"From the Candy Store on the Corner to the Chapel on the Hill"	Dickie Rock	
27 November	"From the Candy Store on the Corner to the Chapel on the Hill"	Dickie Rock	
4 December	"From the Candy Store on the Corner to the Chapel on the Hill"	Dickie Rock	
11 December	"Down Came The Rain"	Butch Moore	
18 December	"I Feel Fine"	The Beatles	
25 December	"I Feel Fine"	The Beatles	

== See also ==
- 1964 in music
- Irish Singles Chart
- List of artists who reached number one in Ireland
