= La novia =

Popular song by Joaquín Prieto recorded by Antonio Prieto

Single by Antonio Prieto

from the album A la novia
- B-side: "El milagro"
- Released: 1961
- Recorded: 1961
- Genre: Pop
- Length: 2:44
- Label: RCA Victor
- Songwriter: Joaquín Prieto

Antonio Prieto singles chronology
| "El reloj" (1959) | "La novia" (1961) | "El secreto" (1961) |

"La novia" (The bride) is a popular song by Chilean songwriter Joaquín Prieto, first recorded by his brother Antonio Prieto. Recorded in Mexico, it became an instant hit in that country and the brothers' native Chile.

After popularizing both in South America and Europe in its original form, it was recorded by British singer Julie Rogers in 1964 as "The Wedding" (sometimes credited as "The Wedding (La Novia)". The song was included on Rogers' extended play from 1964, which was also titled The Wedding, and has appeared on various compilation albums in the years since its release.

== Background, original release and international success ==
Joaquín Prieto, a Chilean musician, wrote a song in Spanish in 1960 that he called "La novia" ("The bride"). It was inspired by an experience lived by his brother Antonio Prieto. In 1982, Antonio told Ecuadorian magazine Hogar "I was the boyfriend of a Chilean girl and I had to leave my country to make some money. When I returned, she was getting married". While Joaquín Prieto composed the song in Chile, Antonio recorded it in Mexico in 1961. It was distributed by RCA Victor, first in South America and later in Spain, Italy and other countries, where it became an instant hit.

Soon later, in 1961, an Argentinian film based on the song, titled La novia was produced, with Elsa Daniel as the main role. Antonio Prieto was part of the cast. The Prieto brothers visited Spain in 1962 and were received enthusiastically by the local press and fans. By the next year, Joaquín was living between Italy and Spain, having signed a contract with RCA Victor as a songwriter. Antonio's "La novia" reached number-one in the Spanish charts in the July 3 and 10, 1961 weeks, while the original version of Prieto and cover versions by Domenico Modugno and Tony Dallara were the number one hit in Italy between the weeks of September 9 and December 16 (except the week of October 7).

Both the original Spanish version, recorded by Joaquín Prieto's brother, Antonio in Argentina, and an English translation by Fred Jay soon became well known in Europe and the United States, and numerous artists recorded versions of the song during the early 1960s. Among artists who recorded versions of "The Wedding" during this time were Anita Bryant and Malcolm Vaughan. The song was also a major hit in Japan in a Japanese version by Peggy Hayama, under the original title of "La Novia." Irish singer Dickie Rock recorded a version of the song in 1988. The Daffodil Junior Australians children's choir recorded a version titled "The Wedding Song" on Troubadour Records in 1972.

Despite the enormous success of the song, songwriter Joaquín Prieto told Las Últimas Noticias in 1963 "I have to confess La novia is a song I do not like at all. [...] There is an impressive amount of [cover] versions I cannot see. The song is intrinsically a song for the populace, but it could be worse...". Chilean Radio Minería chose, in 1966, La novia as "the most popular song in the last twenty years".

== Julie Rogers version ==
"The Wedding"

Single by Julie Rogers

from the album The Wedding
- B-side: "The Love of a Boy"
- Released: 1964
- Recorded: 1964
- Genre: Pop
- Length: 2:28
- Label: Mercury 72332
- Songwriters: Joaquín Prieto (music and original Spanish lyrics); Fred Jay (English lyrics)

Julie Rogers singles chronology
| "It's Magic" (1964) | "The Wedding" (1964) | "Like a Child" (1965) |

Julie Rogers heard the song while working in Spain in the early 1960s, and by 1964 she was the featured singer with British bandleader Teddy Foster. After recording a version of the song "It's Magic", and releasing the latter as her debut single, Rogers suggested "The Wedding" as its follow-up, since it was a song she remembered fondly from her time in Spain. The single was released in the UK in August 1964 and marked her first appearance on the UK Singles Chart, steadily climbing the chart until it spent two weeks at number three in October and November of that year. Around this time Rogers' recording was released in the U.S., and "The Wedding" reached number ten on the Billboard Hot 100 chart and logged three weeks atop the Billboard Middle-Road Singles (adult contemporary) chart in January 1965. The song also reached the top of the Australian Kent Music Report and was a hit in other countries as well, reaching number 2 on Canada's CHUM Chart for 3 weeks and number 8 on the RPM charts. In the mid-1970s, it was estimated that over seven million copies of the song had been sold, and for many years after its release, it was a popular selection at wedding ceremonies around the world.

== Charts and sales ==
Antonio Prieto's version

| Chart (1961) | Peak position |
|---|---|
| Chile (Billboard) | 1 |
| Italy (FIMI) | 1 |
| Spain (PROMUSICAE) | 1 |

Domenico Modugno's version

| Chart (1961) | Peak position |
|---|---|
| Italy (FIMI) | 1 |

Tony Dallara's version

| Chart (1961–62) | Peak position |
|---|---|
| Belgium (Ultratop 50 Flanders) | 1 |
| Belgium (Ultratop 50 Wallonia) | 10 |
| Italy (Musica e dischi) | 1 |
| Netherlands (Single Top 100) | 8 |

Julie Rogers' version

| Chart (1964–65) | Peak position |
|---|---|
| Australia (Go-Set) | 1 |
| Austria (Ö3 Austria Top 40) | 10 |
| Canada (CHUM) Top Singles | 2 |
| Canada (RPM) Top Singles | 8 |
| Netherlands (Single Top 100) | 2 |
| New Zealand Lever Hit Parade | 5 |
| UK Singles (OCC) | 3 |
| US Billboard Hot 100 | 10 |
| US Adult Contemporary (Billboard) | 1 |
| West Germany (GfK) | 16 |

=== Sales ===
| Region | Certification | Certified units/sales |
|---|---|---|
| Argentina Antonio Prieto version | — | 300,000 |

== See also ==
- List of number-one singles in Australia during the 1960s
- List of number-one adult contemporary singles of 1965 (U.S.)
- List of best-selling Latin singles
