= It Feels So Right =

Single by Elvis Presley

from the album Elvis Is Back
- A-side: "(Such an) Easy Question"
- Released: 1965
- Recorded: March 20, 1960
- Studio: RCA Studio B, Nashville
- Length: 2:08
- Songwriters: Ben Weisman; Fred Wise

Elvis Presley singles chronology
| "Crying in the Chapel" (1965) | "(Such an) Easy Question" / "It Feels So Right" (1965) | "I'm Yours" / "(It's a) Long Lonely Highway" (1965) |

"It Feels So Right" is a song written by Ben Weisman and Fred Wise and originally recorded by Elvis Presley with backing vocals provided by the Jordanaires for his 1960 album Elvis Is Back. In 1965, a song titled "(Such an) Easy Question", used for that year's Presley movie Tickle Me, was coupled with "It Feels So Right" for a single release. "(Such an) Easy Question" peaked at number 11 on the Billboard Hot 100, and "It Feels So Right" peaked at number 55.

== Composition ==
The song was written by Ben Weisman and Fred Wise.

== Recording ==
Elvis Presley recorded the song on March 20, 1960, at RCA Studio B in Nashville, Tennessee. It was his second post-army recording session. The session featured Scotty Moore on guitar, Bob Moore on bass, Hank Garland on electric bass, D. J. Fontana and Buddy Harman on drums, Floyd Cramer on piano. Elvis Presley played guitar as well as sang. Backing vocals were provided by the Jordanaires.

== Track listing ==
7" single (RCA Victor 47-8585, )
| No. | Title | Writer(s) | Artist | Length |
|---|---|---|---|---|
| 1. | "(Such an) Easy Question" | Otis Blackwell, Winfield Scott | Elvis Presley with the Jordanaires | 2:19 |
| 2. | "It Feels So Right" | Ben Weisman, Fred Wise | Elvis Presley with the Jordanaires | 2:08 |

== Charts ==
| Chart (1965) | Peak position |
|---|---|
| US Billboard Hot 100 | 55 |
