= Margarita Prieto Yegros =

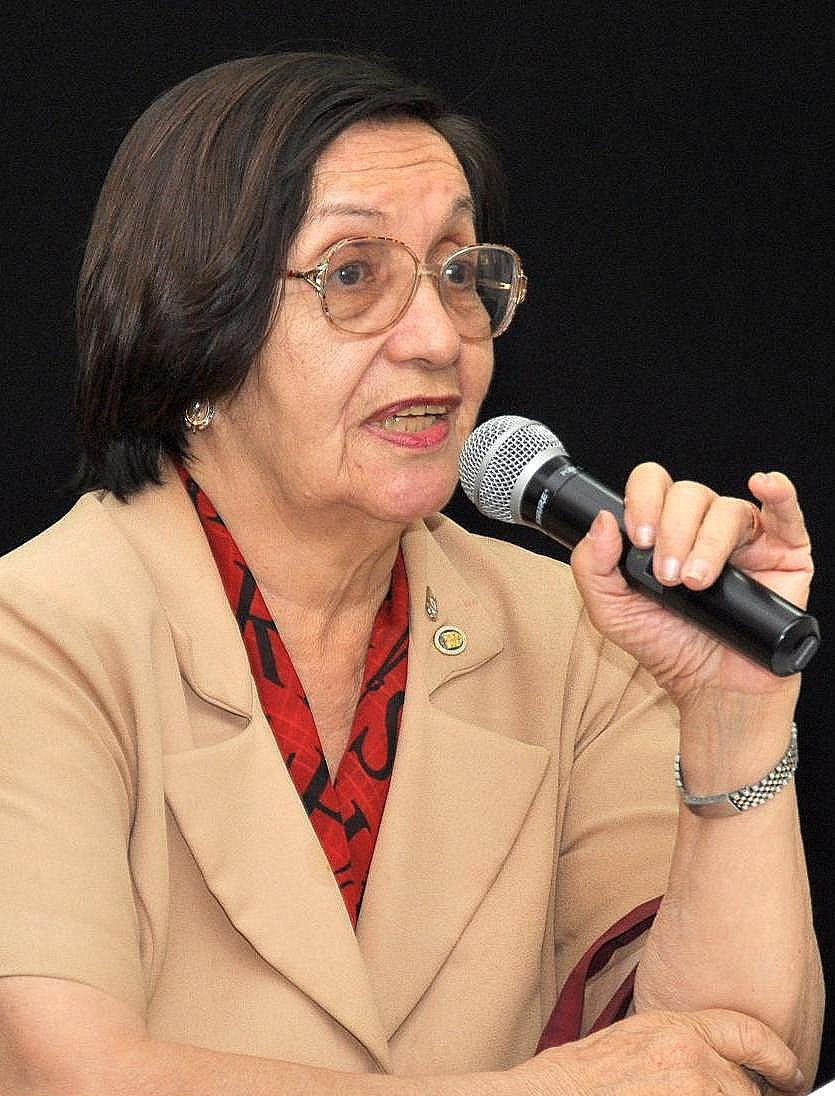
Margarita Prieto Yegros in 2009

Margarita Prieto Yegros (18 November 1936 – 10 October 2017) was a Paraguayan writer, historian, and journalist. She was a recipient of the Honor al Mérito Juana María de Lara.

== Biography ==
Margarita Prieto Yegros was born in Asunción, Paraguay, on 18 November 1936. She received a doctorate in history at the University of Asunción and a master's degree in political science in 1993. She was a member of the Society of Paraguayan Writers and of the PEN Club of Paraguay. A regular contributor to Tupasy Ñe'e, a women's magazine, she was a columnist in numerous newspapers in the capital and from 1986 she was part of a short story workshop which was directed by Professor Hugo Rodríguez-Alcalá.

In 1995 she published Verdad y fantasía (1995), and in 1998 she published a book of short stories, entitled En Tiempo de Chivatos. In 2001 she published Cuentos de la Guerra Grande. Other notable works include Consultorio sentimental (2006), Nuevos cuentos de la Guerra Grande (2006) and El Tratado de Tordesillas. She also authored ten ecological stories, urging protection of the Alto Paraná Atlantic Forest. In her later years she was a pedagogical coordinator at the Universidad del Norte.

== Awards ==
In 2011, she was a recipient of the Honor al Mérito Juana María de Lara.
