= Pot Luck (Elvis Presley album) =

Pot Luck with Elvis

Studio album by Elvis Presley
- Released: May 18, 1962
- Recorded: March 22, 1961 – March 20, 1962
- Studios: Radio Recorders (Hollywood); RCA Studio B (Nashville)
- Genres: Pop; rock and roll
- Length: 28:11
- Label: RCA Victor
- Producers: Steve Sholes (except “Steppin’ Out of Line”, Joseph Lilley)

Elvis Presley chronology
Follow That Dream (1962)	Pot Luck with Elvis (1962)	Kid Galahad (1962)

Singles from Pot Luck
- 1. "Kiss Me Quick / Suspicion" Released: April 14, 1964

Professional ratings
Review scores
Source	Rating
AllMusic	3/5 stars
MusicHound	3/5 stars
New Record Mirror	5/5 stars
Rough Guides (1999 reissue)	3/5 stars

Pot Luck with Elvis is the seventh studio album by American singer and musician Elvis Presley, released on RCA Victor in mono and stereo, LPM/LSP 2523, on May 18, 1962. Recording sessions took place on March 22, 1961, at Radio Recorders in Hollywood, and on June 25 and October 15, 1961, and March 18 and March 19, 1962, at RCA Studio B in Nashville, Tennessee. It peaked at number 4 on the Billboard Top LP's chart.

== Content ==
The album is dominated by the songwriting team of Doc Pomus and Mort Shuman, who had written the chart-topping "Surrender" and the double-sided hit single "(Marie's the Name) His Latest Flame" backed with "Little Sister". The tracks "Kiss Me Quick" and "Suspicion" would be pulled off for a Top 40 single almost two years later in April 1964, following a hit cover version of the latter song by Terry Stafford (an Elvis sound alike). The rest of the tracks originated from regular Presley contributors such as Don Robertson, Otis Blackwell, and Paul Evans, with Blackwell's "(Such an) Easy Question" also being used as a single release in June 1965 and climbing to No. 1 and No. 11 on, respectively, the Billboard Adult Contemporary and Hot 100 charts, during a time when Presley was involved mostly in feature film and soundtrack work.

"That's Someone You Never Forget", with concept and title by Presley, was written in conjunction with Red West and possibly in memory of Elvis' deceased mother, Gladys Presley. The song would later go to number 92 on the Billboard Hot 100 in May 1967 as the B-side to the single "Long Legged Girl (With the Short Dress On)". Another song from these sessions, "You'll Be Gone", written by Presley and West, this time with fellow "Memphis Mafia" cohort Charlie Hodge, would appear as the B-side to "Do the Clam". The song "Steppin' Out of Line" is an unused track from the sessions for Blue Hawaii.

Although like its predecessors in 1960 and 1961 – Elvis Is Back! and Something For Everybody, – Pot Luck easily made the top ten on the album chart, all three had been vastly outsold by the soundtrack albums G.I. Blues and Blue Hawaii, a pattern that would continue to hold for Presley through the mid-1960s. The soundtracks had the advantage of the films as a promotional tool and Colonel Tom Parker went against standard practice in the American record industry by refusing to include hit singles on albums, which would have likely increased sales. As a result, Presley would concentrate on his movie career, and not make another non-soundtrack, non-gospel studio album for another seven years, until From Elvis in Memphis.

== Reissues ==
RCA first reissued the original 12 track album on compact disc in 1988. The July 13, 1999, CD reissue altered the running order of the album, and included five bonus tracks in two sides of one single, one B-side, and two tracks from the 1965 compilation album LSP 3450, Elvis for Everyone. The three single sides had been recorded at the sessions that yielded the balance of the album on March 18 and 19, 1962. One single had both sides written by Jerry Leiber and Mike Stoller, while "You'll Be Gone" had been issued as a B-side in 1965. Given the nature of the Elvis for Everyone LP, compiled from sessions spanning a ten-year stretch, RCA opted not to include it as part of its reissue program, appending its songs as bonus tracks to other albums as appropriate. The bonus tracks were all recorded at Studio B in Nashville.

Pot Luck was reissued on the Follow That Dream label in 2007 in a deluxe 2-disc CD collection containing the original album along with numerous alternate takes from the original recording sessions.

== Track listing ==
=== Original release ===
Side one
No.	Title	Writer(s)	Recording date	Length
1.	"Kiss Me Quick"	Doc Pomus, Mort Shuman	June 25, 1961	2:46
2.	"Just for Old Time Sake"	Roy C. Bennett, Sid Tepper	March 18, 1962	2:08
3.	"Gonna Get Back Home Somehow"	Doc Pomus, Mort Shuman	March 18, 1962	2:27
4.	"(Such an) Easy Question"	Otis Blackwell, Winfield Scott	March 18, 1962	2:18
5.	"Steppin' Out of Line"	Fred Wise, Ben Weisman, Dolores Fuller	March 22, 1961	1:54
6.	"I'm Yours"	Hal Blair, Don Robertson	June 25, 1961	2:21

Side two
No.	Title	Writer(s)	Recording date	Length
1.	"Something Blue"	Paul Evans, Al Byron	March 18, 1962	2:57
2.	"Suspicion"	Doc Pomus, Mort Shuman	March 19, 1962	2:34
3.	"I Feel That I've Known You Forever"	Doc Pomus, Alan Jeffreys	March 19, 1962	1:39
4.	"Night Rider"	Doc Pomus, Mort Shuman	March 18, 1962	2:08
5.	"Fountain of Love"	Bill Giant, Jeff Lewis	March 18, 1962	2:12
6.	"That's Someone You Never Forget"	Elvis Presley, Red West	June 25, 1961	2:47

=== 1999 reissue with bonus tracks ===
Chart position for albums from Billboard's Top Pop Albums chart; positions for singles from Billboard Pop Singles chart.
No.	Title	Writer(s)	Recording date	Length
1.	"Kiss Me Quick"	Doc Pomus, Mort Shuman	June 25, 1961	2:46
2.	"Just for Old Time Sake"	Roy C. Bennett, Sid Tepper	March 18, 1962	2:08
3.	"Gonna Get Back Home Somehow"	Doc Pomus, Mort Shuman	March 18, 1962	2:27
4.	"I Met Her Today" (released on Elvis for Everyone, LSP 3450, August 10, 1965, #10)	Hal Blair, Don Robertson	October 15, 1961	2:42
5.	"(Such an) Easy Question"	Otis Blackwell, Winfield Scott	March 18, 1962	2:18
6.	"She's Not You" (released as a single, 47-8041, July 17, 1962, #5)	Doc Pomus, Jerry Leiber, Mike Stoller	March 19, 1962	2:08
7.	"I'm Yours"	Hal Blair, Don Robertson	June 25, 1961	2:21
8.	"You'll Be Gone" (released as a single, 47-8500b, February 9, 1965)	Elvis Presley, Red West, Charlie Hodge	March 18, 1962	2:23
9.	"Something Blue"	Paul Evans, Al Byron	March 18, 1962	2:57
10.	"Suspicion"	Doc Pomus, Mort Shuman	March 19, 1962	2:34
11.	"I Feel That I've Known You Forever"	Doc Pomus, Alan Jeffreys	March 19, 1962	1:39
12.	"Night Rider"	Doc Pomus, Mort Shuman	October 15, 1961	2:08
13.	"For the Millionth and the Last Time" (released on Elvis for Everyone, LSP 3450, August 10, 1965, #10)	Roy C. Bennett, Sid Tepper	October 15, 1961	2:05
14.	"Just Tell Her Jim Said Hello" (released as a single, 47-8041b, July 7, 1962, #55)	Jerry Leiber, Mike Stoller	March 19, 1962	1:51
15.	"Fountain of Love"	Bill Giant, Jeff Lewis	March 18, 1962	2:12
16.	"That's Someone You Never Forget"	Elvis Presley, Red West	June 25, 1961	2:47
17.	"Steppin' Out of Line"	Fred Wise, Ben Weisman, Dolores Fuller	March 22, 1961	1:54

=== 2007 Follow That Dream CD reissue ===
Original Album
No.	Title	Length
1.	"Kiss Me Quick"	2:49
2.	"Just For Old Time Sake"	2:11
3.	"Gonna Get Back Somehow"	2:31
4.	"(Such An) Easy Question"	2:22
5.	"Steppin' Out Of Line"	1:56
6.	"I’m Yours"	2:22
7.	"Something Blue"	3:01
8.	"Suspicion"	2:36
9.	"I Feel That I've Known You Forever"	1:42
10.	"Night Rider"	2:11
11.	"Fountain of Love"	2:16
12.	"That's Someone You Never Forget"	2:52

Singles
No.	Title	Length
13.	"She's Not You"	2:11
14.	"Just Tell Her Jim Said Hello"	2:00
15.	"You'll Be Gone"	2:26

Bonus Songs
No.	Title	Length
16.	"For The Millionth And Last Time"	2:08
17.	"I Met Her Today"	2:45

First Takes
No.	Title	Length
18.	"Kiss Me Quick" (take 1)	3:03
19.	"Just For Old Time Sake" (take 1)	2:12
20.	"Gonna Get Back Somehow" (take 1)	2:39
21.	"(Such An) Easy Question" (take 2)	1:53
22.	"I’m Yours" (take 1)	2:21
23.	"Something Blue" (take 1*)	3:27
24.	"Suspicion" (take 1*)	2:42
25.	"I Feel That I've Known You Forever" (take 1)	1:47
26.	"Night Rider" (take 1)	2:22
27.	"Fountain of Love" (takes 1, 2)	2:52
28.	"That's Someone You Never Forget" (take 1)	2:53
29.	"She's Not You" (take 1)	1:34
30.	"Just Tell Her Jim Said Hello" (take 1)	1:54
31.	"You'll Be Gone" (take 1)	2:35
32.	"For The Millionth And Last Time" (take 1)	2:08
33.	"I Met Her Today" (take 1)	2:51

March 1962 Session
No.	Title	Length
1.	"Something Blue" (take 2)	3:11
2.	"Something Blue" (takes 3, 4)	3:30
3.	"Gonna Get Back Somehow" (take 2)	2:44
4.	"Gonna Get Back Somehow" (takes 3*, 5)	3:02
5.	"(Such An) Easy Question" (takes 1, 3)	3:34
6.	"Fountain of Love" (takes 4*, 9*)	3:00
7.	"Just For Old Time Sake" (takes 2*, 3, 4)	3:28
8.	"Night Rider" (takes 2, 3)	2:59
9.	"Night Rider" (take 5)	2:28
10.	"You'll Be Gone" (take 2)	2:30
11.	"You'll Be Gone" (take 4)	3:19
12.	"I Feel That I've Known You Forever" (takes 4*, 3)	2:29
13.	"Just Tell Her Jim Said Hello" (take 2)	1:57
14.	"Just Tell Her Jim Said Hello" (take 4)	2:07
15.	"Just Tell Her Jim Said Hello" (take 5)	1:49
16.	"Suspicion" (takes 3*, 2)	3:17
17.	"She's Not You" (take 2*, WP take 4)	3:45

October 1961 Session
No.	Title	Length
18.	"For The Millionth And Last Time" (takes 10*, 7*)	2:46
19.	"I Met Her Today" (take 4)	2:45
20.	"I Met Her Today" (takes 8, 9)	3:07
21.	"I Met Her Today" (take 16)	2:47
22.	"Night Rider" (takes 1-FS, 2)	2:31

June 1961 Session
No.	Title	Length
23.	"Kiss Me Quick" (take 4)	3:00
24.	"I’m Yours" (take 2)	2:46
25.	"I’m Yours" (take 4)	2:26
26.	"I’m Yours" (take 5)	2:17
27.	"That's Someone You Never Forget" (take 5)	2:54
28.	"That's Someone You Never Forget" (take 7)	3:01

Note

- *previously unreleased

== Personnel ==
- Elvis Presley – lead vocals
- Scotty Moore – rhythm guitar
- Jerry Kennedy – lead guitar on "Night Rider"
- Hank Garland – lead guitar on "Kiss Me Quick", "Steppin' Out of Line", "I'm Yours", and "That's Someone You Never Forget"
- Tiny Timbrell – rhythm guitar on "Steppin' Out of Line"
- Harold Bradley – guitar
- Grady Martin – guitar, vibes
- Floyd Cramer – piano, organ
- Gordon Stoker – piano
- Bob Moore – double bass
- D. J. Fontana – drums
- Buddy Harman – drums
- Millie Kirkham – backing vocals
- The Jordanaires – backing vocals
- Boots Randolph – saxophone

== Charts ==
Year	Chart	Peak position
1962	UK Albums Chart	1
