= Suspicion (Terry Stafford song) =

1962 song by Terry Stafford

Single by Terry Stafford

from the album Suspicion!
- B-side: "Judy"
- Released: February 1964
- Recorded: May 2, 1962 ("Suspicion"); late 1963 ("Judy")
- Genre: Pop, rock and roll
- Length: 2:27
- Label: Crusader C 101
- Songwriters: Doc Pomus, Mort Shuman
- Producer: John Fisher

Terry Stafford singles chronology
"You Left Me Here To Cry (Come On Home)" (1963)	"Suspicion" (1964)	"I'll Touch a Star" (1964)

"Suspicion"

Single by Elvis Presley

from the album Pot Luck
- A-side: (United States) "Kiss Me Quick" (Europe) Suspicion
- B-side: (United States) Suspicion (Europe) "It Hurts Me"
- Released: (United States) April 16, 1964 (Europe) May 1964
- Recorded: March 19, 1962
- Genre: Pop
- Length: 2:35
- Label: RCA Victor (United States) 447-0639 (Europe) 47-9533
- Songwriters: Doc Pomus, Mort Shuman

Elvis Presley singles chronology
" (United States) "Kissin' Cousins" (Europe) "Viva Las Vegas"" (1964)	"Suspicion" (1964)	" (United States) "What'd I Say" (Europe) "Kissin' Cousins"" (1964)

"Suspicion"

Single by Elvis Presley

from the album Pot Luck
- A-side: "Kiss Me Quick"/ "Suspicion"
- B-side: "Sentimental Me"/ "I Want You With Me"
- Released: May 1964
- Recorded: March 19, 1962
- Genre: Pop
- Length: 2:35
- Label: RCA Victor 20277
- Songwriters: Doc Pomus, Mort Shuman

Elvis Presley singles chronology
" (Australia) "C'mon Everybody" EP" (1964)	"Suspicion" (1964)	" (Australia) "Such a Night"" (1964)

"Suspicion"

Single by Elvis Presley

from the album Elvis in Demand (United Kingdom)
- B-side: "It's a Long Lonely Highway"
- Released: November 26, 1976
- Recorded: March 9, 1962
- Genre: Pop
- Length: 2:35 Spanish
- Label: RCA Victor 2768
- Songwriters: Doc Pomus, Mort Shuman

Elvis Presley singles chronology
" (United Kingdom) "The Girl of My Best Friend"" (1976)	"Suspicion" (1976)	" (United Kingdom) "Moody Blue"" (1977)

"Suspicion" is a 1962 song originally recorded by Elvis Presley and written by Doc Pomus and Mort Shuman. It became a major hit in 1964 for Terry Stafford, an Elvis Presley sound-alike.

== Elvis Presley version ==
One of 25 songs written by Pomus and Shuman for Elvis Presley, "Suspicion" was recorded by Presley on March 19, 1962, in Studio B of RCA's Nashville studio and issued on Presley's album Pot Luck (released on June 15, 1962). By the time the Terry Stafford single reached the top ten of the Billboard Hot 100 in April 1964, the Presley original was given a US single release with "Kiss Me Quick" as the flip. However, it was "Kiss Me Quick" that became the favored side, reaching No. 34 nationally. Presley's "Suspicion" peaked at No. 103 and was published by Elvis Presley Music, Inc.

In Australia, "Kiss Me Quick" and "Suspicion" appeared on the chart as a double A-side hit with a No. 56 peak. The actual format for this Australian release was a four-track EP entitled Elvis Sings Kiss Me Quick, which featured "Kiss Me Quick" and "Suspicion" as A-side tracks with a B-side composed of "Sentimental Me" and "I Want You With Me". "Suspicion" was also issued as a single in several European countries to vie with the Terry Stafford version. It peaked at No. 5 on the New Zealand Lever Hit Parade chart. The Presley version charted in the Netherlands and Dutch-speaking Belgium, with respective peaks of No. 9 and No. 6. In Norway, the chart peak was No. 9, and in Denmark No. 3; in its European single release, "Suspicion" featured "It Hurts Me" as the B-side. More than a decade later, "Suspicion" would afford Presley a Top Ten hit in the UK, where its December 1976 single release rose to a peak of No. 9 on the chart dated February 5, 1977.

== Terry Stafford version ==
After an unsuccessful affiliation with A&M Records, Terry Stafford cut a demo of "Suspicion" at the Los Angeles studio of Bob Summers. Summers, best known as the producer of the 1959 Larry Hall hit "Sandy", played all the instruments on the demo. Stafford and Stafford's manager pitched the demo to record companies in the Los Angeles area and also to local radio stations, including KFWB, where disc jockey Gene Weed was impressed enough to take it next door to the headquarters of the newly formed Crusader Records. John Fisher, the president of Crusader, spent several hours remastering the demo, with the resultant track becoming the second single released on Crusader. The arrangement included rhythmic backing accompaniment with an Ondioline, an idiosyncratic French-built electronic keyboard.

After breaking out in San Bernardino, California in January 1964, "Suspicion" made its top-tier market breakthrough in Los Angeles in February 1964. The following month, it peaked at respectively number 2 and number 4 on the hit parades of radio stations KRLA and KFWB and then quickly spread east, hitting number 1 on WLS in Chicago for most of April. Nationally "Suspicion" rose from No. 7 to No. 6 on the Billboard Hot 100 dated April 4, 1964, when the chart's top five hits were all by the Beatles. "Suspicion" broke the Beatles' monopoly on the top five spots on the chart by rising to No. 3, its peak position, the next week. Stafford's "Suspicion" reached No. 31 in the UK Singles Chart, and also No. 3 in Canada.

== Cover versions ==
In 1964, Hong Kong singer Rebecca Pan covered '"Suspicion" on her LP album I Love You, released by Diamond Records.

A humorous, even maniacal spoof version of the song was recorded by Vivian Stanshall and Gargantuan Chums, produced by Keith Moon and with Jon Entwistle in 1970.

"Suspicion" first became a C&W chart hit in 1971 via a remake by Bobby G. Rice which reached No. 33 C&W, with the track being included on Rice's debut album Hit After Hit.

In 1988 "Suspicion" charted for Ronnie McDowell whose version, taken from McDowell's I'm Still Missing You album, reached No. 27 C&W.

In 2005, Bahamian singer-composer Diana Hamilton covered '"Suspicion" on her LP album A Bahamian in Paris, in collaboration with Eric Henri-Gréard, songwriter Florian Lacour, and produced by Patrick Rouchon.

"Suspicion" has also been covered by Jimmy London, Millicent Martin, Larry Marshall and Delroy Wilson.

== Phil Spector composition claim ==
In a 2002 interview with journalist Mick Brown, record producer Phil Spector claimed he wrote and/or produced "Suspicion", but did not receive credit: "I made 'Suspicion' for Terry Stafford -- I didn't get any credit or any money. I didn't care. I just loved making records."

== See also ==
- List of 1960s one-hit wonders in the United States
