= (Such an) Easy Question =

1962 song by Elvis Presley

Single by Elvis Presley

from the album Pot Luck
- B-side: "It Feels So Right"
- Released: 1962 (on Pot Luck); June 8, 1965 (as single)
- Recorded: March 18, 1962
- Studio: RCA Studio B, Nashville
- Genre: Rock and Roll, pop
- Label: RCA Victor
- Songwriters: Otis Blackwell; Winfield Scott

Elvis Presley singles chronology
"Crying in the Chapel" (1965)	"(Such an) Easy Question" / "It Feels So Right" (1962)	"I'm Yours" / "(It's a) Long Lonely Highway" (1965)

"(Such an) Easy Question" is a song recorded by Elvis Presley in 1962 for the Pot Luck with Elvis album. It was released as a single in 1965.

== Background ==
The song was recorded on March 18, 1962, at RCA Studio B in Nashville, Tennessee. The song was published by Elvis Presley Music, Inc. It was written by Otis Blackwell and Winfield Scott. It was first released on the Pot Luck album in 1962 and again in 1965 as a single due to its inclusion in the Elvis Presley movie Tickle Me. The B-side was "It Feels So Right". The Jordanaires provided the background vocals.

The single release was the follow-up to "Crying in the Chapel" and peaked at number 11 on the US Billboard Hot 100. As with "Crying in the Chapel", "(Such an) Easy Question" reached the top of the Billboard Easy Listening chart, spending two weeks at number one in July 1965. The single was also released in Germany, Chile, New Zealand, and Trinidad and Tobago.

== See also ==
- List of Billboard Easy Listening number ones of 1965
