= (It's a) Long Lonely Highway =

Single by Elvis Presley
- A-side: "(It's a) Long Lonely Highway" "I'm Yours"
- Released: August 10, 1965
- Recorded: May 27, 1963
- Studio: RCA's Studio B, Nashville
- Length: 2:18
- Songwriters: Doc Pomus; Mort Shuman

Elvis Presley singles chronology
"(Such an) Easy Question" / "It Feels So Right" (1965)	"(It's a) Long Lonely Highway" / "I'm Yours" (1965)	"Puppet on a String" / "Wooden Heart" (1965)

"(It's a) Long Lonely Highway" is a song written by Doc Pomus and Mort Shuman and originally recorded by Elvis Presley. It reached number 44 in francophone Belgium in 1965.

== Composition ==
The song was written by Doc Pomus and Mort Shuman.

== Recording and release ==
Elvis Presley recorded the song on May 27, 1963, at RCA Studio B, Nashville, Tennessee. The recording session featured Grady Martin, Harold Bradley, Jerry Kennedy and Scotty Moore on guitar, Bob Moore on bass, and D. J. Fontana and Buddy Harman on drums, Floyd Cramer on piano, and Boots Randolph on saxophone, vibes and shakers. Additional vocals were provided by Millie Kirkham and the Jordanaires.

This song was intended for a 1963 studio album, but the album was abandoned. So the song was eventually included as a bonus on the Kissin' Cousins soundtrack album released in April 1964, becoming its highlight and helping it sell 300,000 copies. On August 10, 1965, an alternate take (recorded on the same day as the album version) was released as the B-side to "I'm Yours".

== Track listing ==
7" single (RCA Victor 47-8657, 1965)
No.	Title	Writer(s)	Length
1.	"(It's a) Long Lonely Highway"	Doc Pomus, Mort Shuman	2:18
2.	"I'm Yours"	Don Robertson, Hal Blair	2:20

== Charts ==
Chart (1965)	Peak position
Belgium (Ultratop 50 Wallonia)	44
