= Girl Happy (song) =

Song by Elvis Presley

from the album Girl Happy
- Released: 1965
- Recorded: June 10, 1964
- Length: 2:07
- Label: RCA Victor
- Songwriter(s): Doc Pomus; Norman Meade
- Producer(s): Steve Sholes

"Girl Happy" is a song first recorded by Elvis Presley as part of the soundtrack for his 1965 motion picture Girl Happy.

Its first release was on the soundtrack LP Girl Happy in April 1965.

== Writing and recording ==
The song was written by Doc Pomus and Norman Meade (real name Jordan "Jerry" Ragovoy).

There was also a first attempt at writing a title song for the movie. The first song was penned by Doc Pomus with his long-time collaborator Mort Shuman, but was rejected. (The Pomus-Shuman collaboration started to disintegrate back in 1961 and since then Doc Pomus was encouraged to work with other songwriters.)

Presley recorded the song on June 10, 1964, at the June 10–12 and 15 soundtrack sessions for the M.G.M. movie Girl Happy at the Radio Recorders studio in Hollywood, California.
