= Eric Hermannson's Soul =

1900 short story by Willa Cather

- Short story by Willa Cather
- Country: United States
- Language: English
- Genre: Short story

Publication
- Published in: Cosmopolitan
- Publication type: Women's magazine
- Publication date: April 1900

"Eric Hermannson's Soul" is a short story by Willa Cather. It was first published in Cosmopolitan in April 1900.

== Plot summary ==
In rural Nebraska, Eric Hermannson gives up on girls after seeing a rattlesnake whilst on a date with Lena, and stops playing the violin shortly after; he becomes a good Free Gospeller as his mother wants him to be. Later, Wyllis comes back with his sister Margaret. She sings to Eric, thus reawakening his passion for music. Later, she is riding a mustang from St. Anne back to her village with Eric. She asks him to go to a dance and he agrees, although this would breach his Church's covenant. The horses go wild, and he saves her from injury. Back in her house, she receives a letter from her fiancé from the East Coast. Later at the ball, Margaret and Eric dance together, then go out and up a hill. She tells him she is soon to leave and never come back again. After she has left, Eric talks to his pastor and confesses to dancing.

== Characters ==
- Asa Skinner, a guru of the Free Gospel.
- Eric Hermannson, a Norwegian. He likes to play the violin. He is taciturn.
- Mrs Hermannson, Eric's mother.
- Genereau, a saloon-keeper.
- Lena Hanson, a local girl Eric goes on a date with.
- Wyllis Elliot
- Margaret Elliot, Wyllis' sister. She is twenty-four years old and about to marry a man from the East coast.
- Jerry Lockhart, a local man.
- Mrs Lockhart, Jerry's mother. She organises the ball.
- Olaf Oleson, an accordion player.
- Jack Courtwell, someone Margaret's husband mentions in his letter.
- Miss Harrison, someone Margaret's husband mentions in his letter.
- Gerard, someone Margaret's fiancé mentions in his letter.
- Constant, someone Margaret's fiancé mentions in his letter.

== Allusions to other works ==
- Literature is mentioned with The Bible (especially Saul and Lazarus), Paul Bourget, Alfred Tennyson, 1st Baron Tennyson, William Shakespeare's As You Like It, and Thor.
- Sculptures are alluded to with Doryphoros.
- Music is mentioned with Pietro Mascagni's Cavalleria rusticana, Stefano Rossetto, Franz Schubert, and Edvard Grieg.

== Allusions to actual history ==
- Nero is mentioned in passing.

== Adaptations ==
Several stage adaptations of the story exist; among these are the 1979 musical Out to the Wind by Robert Beadell and two operas, both sharing the title of the story; one by Jonathan Chenette dating to 1993, and another by Libby Larsen dating to 1998.
