= Julie Rogers =

English pop singer (born 1943)

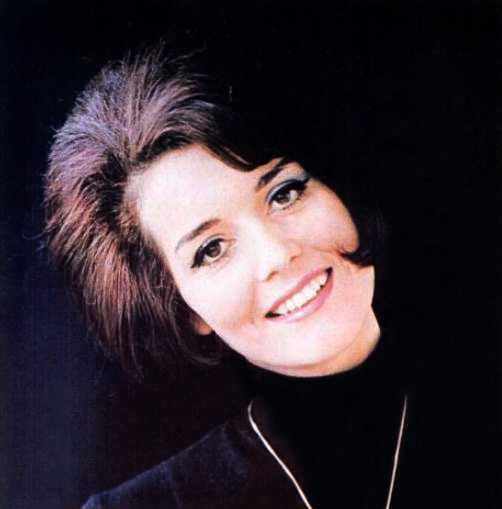
- Julie Rogers in 1964
- Born: Julia Rolls; 6 April 1943 (age 83); Bermondsey, London, England
- Known for: " The Wedding"
- Musical career
- Genres: Easy listening Traditional popular music
- Occupation: Singer
- Instrument: Vocals
- Years active: 1963–present
- Labels: Philips Records, Mercury Records, Ember Records, Pye Records
- Website: Official website

Julie Rogers (born Julia Rolls; 6 April 1943) is an English pop singer. She is best known for her 1964 multi-million selling single "The Wedding".

== Career ==
Bermondsey-born Rogers, the youngest of five children, had piano lessons and started her career after leaving Kingsbury County Grammar School. She worked as a dancer in Spain, as a secretary in Britain and as a stewardess on a Union-Castle Line ship, before singing with the Teddy Foster Orchestra, with which she toured the UK and America. A&R man Johnny Franz signed her to a recording contract with Philips Records in 1964, and released her debut single, "It's Magic". The song had originally been a hit for Doris Day in 1948.

Her 1964 hit "The Wedding" went to No. 3 in the UK Singles Chart, No. 1 in Australia and peaked at No. 10 in January 1965 in the US, in addition to topping the US Adult Contemporary chart. In 1961 "The Wedding" had been successful for Anita Bryant and Malcolm Vaughan, but Rogers' recording outsold them both. At the time of the release of "The Wedding", Rogers told the NME that she wanted to become an international artist. "The Wedding" was estimated by 1972 to have sold over seven million copies.

She had further UK hits with "Like a Child" (UK No. 20, US No. 67) and "Hawaiian Wedding Song" (UK No. 31), both in 1965.

She also recorded a demo of "You Only Live Twice", which appeared on the 1992 limited edition version of the album, The Best of Bond... James Bond. The song's writers, composer John Barry and lyricist Leslie Bricusse, later wrote a completely different title song of the same name and it was Nancy Sinatra's subsequent recording of this that was used in the film of the same name.

Rogers continued to tour the world on the strength of her 1960s hits for several decades. Her most recent release was the 2003 album Sing Another Song.

== Personal life ==
In 1968, she married Teddy Foster, and they remained a couple until Foster's death in 1984 from kidney failure. In 1987, she married show business agent Michael Black, the brother of lyricist Don Black. Until his death in November 2018, he acted as her manager.

== Discography ==
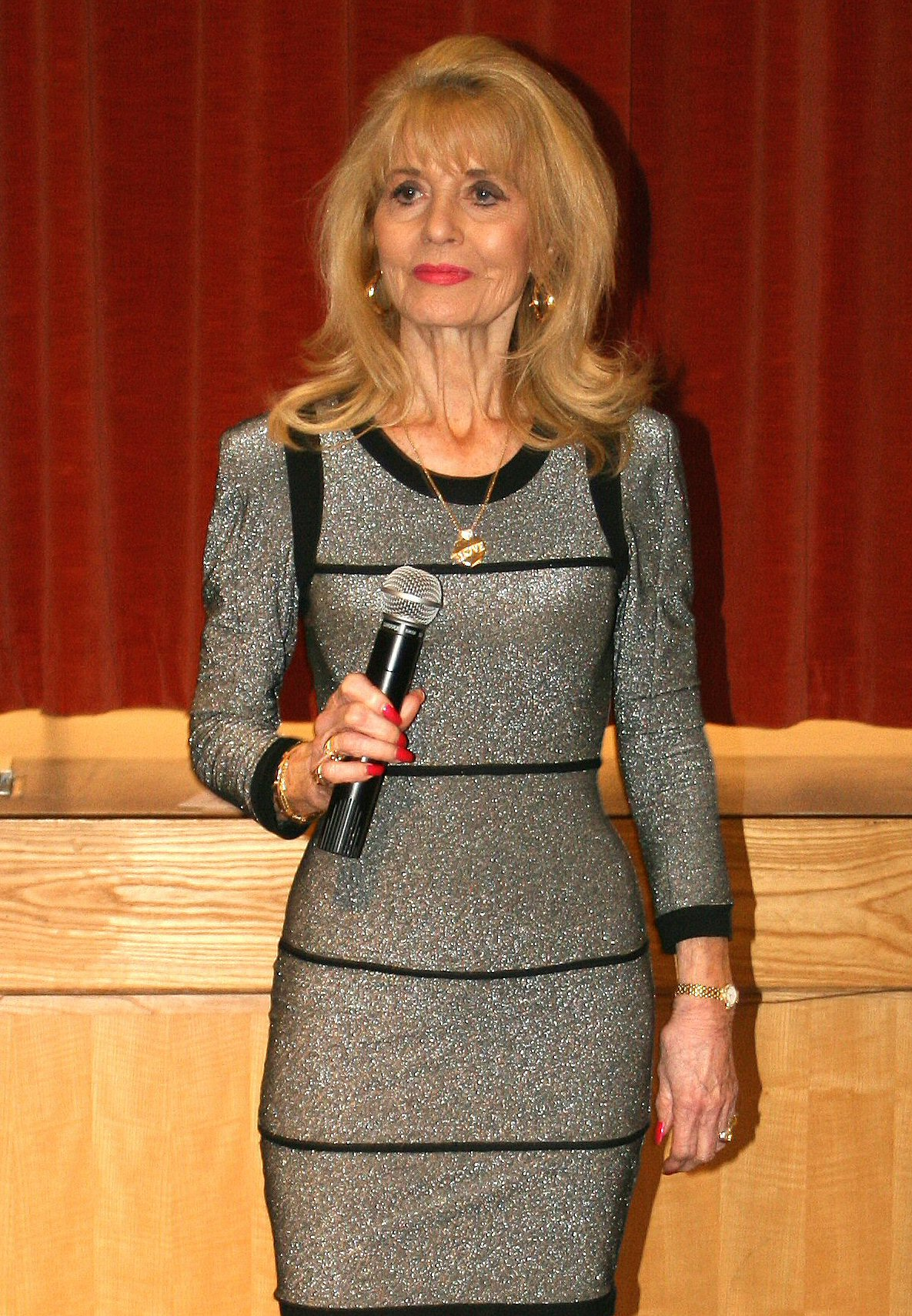
Julie Rogers, Nightingale House, February 2010

=== Singles ===
- "It's Magic" (1964)
- "The Wedding" (1964) – UK Singles Chart UK No. 3; US No. 10; CAN No. 8;
- "Like a Child" (1964) – UK No. 20; US No. 67
- "Hawaiian Wedding Song" (1965) – UK No. 31
- "Sudden Love" (1965)
- "Day By Day" (1965)
- "Another Year, Another Love, Another Heartache" (1965)
- "In My Room" (1965)
- "I Love Him" (1965)
- "While The Angelus Was Ringing" (1965)
- "These Gentle Hands" (1966)
- "Bless You" (1966)
- "You Never Told Me" (Mercury 154 277 MCF – Italy – 1966)
- "Go on home" (1967)
- "Let Me Belong To You" (1968)
- "Don't Speak of Love" (1968)
- "Almost Close to You" (1969)
- "Which Way to Nowhere" (1969)
- "Long After Tonight is All Over" (1974)

† – Billed as Julie Rogers with Johnny Arthey and his Orchestra and Chorus

=== Albums ===
- Julie Rogers (1964)
- The Sound of Julie (1965)
- Contrasts (1966)
- Songs of Inspiration (1967)
- Once More with Feeling (1970)
- My Name is Julie (1976)
- Sing Another Song (2003)

== See also ==
- List of 1960s one-hit wonders in the United States
