= Kiss Me Quick (Elvis Presley song) =

1961 song by Elvis Presley

Single by Elvis Presley

from the album Pot Luck
- A-side: "Kiss Me Quick"
- B-side: "Suspicion"
- Released: April 14, 1964
- Recorded: June 25, 1961
- Genre: Rock and roll, pop
- Length: 2:49
- Label: RCA Records
- Songwriters: Doc Pomus, Mort Shuman

Elvis Presley singles chronology
"Kissin' Cousins" / "It Hurts Me" (1964)	"Kiss Me Quick" / "Suspicion" (1964)	"Viva Las Vegas" / "What'd I Say" (1964)

"Kiss Me Quick" is a 1961 song recorded by Elvis Presley which was first released on the album Pot Luck with Elvis. It was released as a single in the UK in 1963 and the U.S. in 1964.

== Background ==
Elvis Presley recorded the song on June 25, 1961, and released it on June 5, 1962, on RCA on the album Pot Luck. The song was released in 1963 as a single, backed by "Something Blue", in the United Kingdom and Europe by Elvis Presley with The Jordanaires in December on RCA Victor. It was listed as a number-one single for eight weeks, from June until July 1963, in Europe. In 1964, the song was released as a single in the U.S. with "Suspicion" as the flip side. It was also released as a single in South Africa, Brazil, and Japan that year.

The song was published by Elvis Presley Music, Inc. It was written by Doc Pomus and Mort Shuman. A 4-track extended play of the same name was released in 1964 in the Netherlands. It features "Kiss Me Quick" and "Night Rider" on side one, and "Joshua Fit the Battle" and "Judy" on side two. The song is also featured on many of Elvis Presley's compilation and other or various artists' albums.

On December 7, 1963, the Beatles appeared as panelists on the BBC-TV program Juke Box Jury on which they reviewed "Kiss Me Quick" negatively, though John Lennon thought it would be a hit because of Elvis' fame. The single would peak at No. 34 on the Billboard singles chart in 1964, No. 29 in Record World, No. 14 in the UK in 1964, and No. 3 in Canada and Germany.

== Other recordings ==
The song was covered by Austrian popular singer and composer, Udo Jürgens, who released his cover of the song many times and in many formats from 1963 on, by Japanese rock band, Sheena & The Rokkets, on the band's 1980 album Channel Good. Terry Stafford recorded the song in 1964 on the Crusader label. "Kiss Me Quick" was also in the repertoires of German tenor, Peter Hofmann, who had a successful performance career within the fields of opera, rock, pop, and musical theatre, and of Swedish Elvis impersonator, Eilert Pilarm.

== Releases and appearances ==
Extended plays and singles releases of "Kiss Me Quick".

Year	Title
1962	"Kiss Me Quick" / "Something Blue" by Elvis Presley and The Jordanaires Type: Single; Format: 7" Vinyl; Released: December 1962; Label: RCA Victor RCA 1375 Country: UK, Europe
1963	"Kiss Me Quick" / "Night Rider" by Elvis Presley Type: Single; Format: 7" Vinyl; Released: December 1963; Label: RCA Records 47-9452 Country: Germany
1964	"Suspicion" / "Kiss Me Quick" by Elvis Presley Type: Single; Format: 7" Vinyl; Released: 1964; Label: RCA Victor 45.562 S Country: France
1964	"Kiss Me Quick" / "No More" by Elvis Presley Type: Single; Format: 7" Vinyl; Released: 1964; Label: RCA Victor 47-1085 Country: Denmark
1964	"Kiss Me Quick" / "Suspicion" by Elvis Presley Type: Single; Format: 7" Vinyl; Released: April 14, 1964; Label: RCA Victor 447-0639 Country: United States
1964	Kiss Me Quick by Elvis Presley Type: Extended play Format: 7" Vinyl; Released: 1964; Label: RCA Victor EP RCA 1375; Country: Netherlands Side A: 1. "Kiss Me Quick"; 2. "Night Rider"; Side B: 1. "Joshua Fit the Battle"; 2. "Judy"
1968	"The Night Rider" / "Kiss Me Quick" by Elvis Presley with the Jordanaires Type: Single; Format: 7" Vinyl; Released: 1968; Label: RCA Victor 47-9452 Country: Germany
1976	"Suspicion" / "Kiss Me Quick" by Elvis Presley with the Jordanaires by Elvis Presley; Format: 7" Vinyl; Released: 1977; Label: RCA Victor 447-0639 Country: Canada
1977	"Suspicion" / "Kiss Me Quick" by Elvis Presley Type: Single; Format: 7" Vinyl; Released: 1977; Label: RCA Victor PB 9058 Country: Belgium

Albums containing "Kiss Me Quick".

- 1962 Pot Luck (Vinyl RCA PL42737)
- 1973 A Portrait In Music (Vinyl RCA Victor SRS558)
- 1977 Disco De Ouro (Vinyl RCA 1094001)
- 1977 Record Covers (Vinyl RCA 4711000)
- 1978 Elvis (Vinyl AMIGA 855630)
- 1980 Elvis Forever Vol. 2 (Vinyl RCA CL42853)
- 1985 Sweet Songs (various artists compilation) (CD Ariola Express 970320)
- 1987 His 32 (Vinyl RCA Special Products SPLP010787)
- 1988 Pot Luck (CD reissue RCA ND89098)
- 1988 Remembering Elvis (CD Pair PDC-2-1037)
- 1989 Love Me Tender (CD Ariola Express 295052)
- 1989 Elvis Presley (Vinyl, Box Set RCA Victor 1150005AB-CD-EF)
- 1990 The Definite Love Album (CD RCA 868050, Aris 886805)
- 1991 Elvis: The King – Die Hits der Deutschen Charts (CD BMG International PD90583)
- 1992 Elvis Forever II (CD RCA PD90680)
- 1993 From Nashville to Memphis: The Essential 60's Masters (CS RCA 66160–4, CD RCA 66160-2/74321154302, 2005 reissue CD BMG 37027, 2010 reissue CD Sony Music UK 88697787832)
- 1995 Elvis Gold - The Very Best Of The King (CD BMG 74321249742)
- 1996 The Original Elvis Presley Collection (CD, Box Set RCA, BMG Nederland BV)
- 1997 The 100 Top-Hits Collection (CD RCA 3642933)
- 1998 The Elvis Presley Collection: The Romantic (CD Time/Life Music 80607)
- 1999 Pot Luck (CD reissue RCA 07863677392)
- 2000 Elvis 2000 (CS Media TV-O 74321737484, CD BMG International 73748)
- 2000 Elvis Chante Mort Shuman & Doc Pomus (CD BMG 74321745962/745962)
- 2000 Elvis Lovin' (CD BMG International 76520/74321765202)
- 2000 Lovin' & Rockin' (CD BMG 74321785322)
- 2001 Blue Suede Shoes Collection (CD RCA 69372)
- 2001 Devil In Disguise (Gold) (Zounds Music 2700022011)
- 2001 Swedish Hit Collection (BMG International 79163)
- 2003 Elvis: Close Up (BMG Heritage 82876505372, CS-CD RCA 50537)
- 2005 Hitstory (Box Set, CD Sony BMG Music Entertainment 82876739352/73176)
- 2007 The Dutch Collection (CD Sony BMG Music Entertainment (Netherlands)/RCA 88697118062)
- 2008 Elvis in Deutschland (CD Sbm Records 88697370662/88697394922/88697394932)
- 2009 50s Jukebox Hits (CD Dance Street 41192, TIP Records BOX 41192)
- 2009 Elvis 75 (Sony Music Entertainment 61948, 2010 CD RCA 88697619482)
- 2010 The Complete Elvis Presley Masters (Box Set, CD RCA 11826)
