= Do the Clam =

- 1965 U.S. RCA Victor 45 picture sleeve, 47-8500

Single by Elvis Presley

from the album Girl Happy
- B-side: "You'll Be Gone"
- Released: February 9, 1965
- Recorded: June 12, 1964
- Studio: Radio Recorders, Hollywood
- Genre: Pop; rock and roll
- Length: 3:17
- Label: RCA Victor
- Songwriters: Sid Wayne; Ben Weisman; Dolores Fuller

Elvis Presley singles chronology
"Blue Christmas" (1965)	"Do the Clam" / "You'll Be Gone" (1965)	"Crying in the Chapel" (1965)

"Do the Clam" is a song recorded by Elvis Presley for his 1965 feature film Girl Happy. It was written by Sid Wayne, Ben Weisman, and Dolores Fuller.

== Background ==
The song's co-writer Dolores Fuller was a songwriter and actress who had played the role as the title character's girlfriend in Ed Wood's 1953 surrealist film, Glen or Glenda. The song was copyrighted on February 4, 1965, and published by Gladys Music, Inc., Elvis Presley's publishing company The B-side of the 1965 single release was "You'll Be Gone", written by Red West, Elvis Presley, and Charlie Hodge in 1962. The B-side reached No. 121 on Billboard and No. 35 on the Canadian charts. Both songs were on the Girl Happy soundtrack album. "You'll Be Gone" was an attempt to create the same kind of song as Begin the Beguine after Elvis Presley's Management Team failed to obtain the rights to cover the song. "You'll Be Gone" is one of the songs for which Elvis Presley got a co-writer credit. (Another Elvis Presley composition is "That's Someone You Never Forget", written with Red West in 1961.)

== Chart history ==
“Do the Clam” was released worldwide as a single by RCA Victor, reaching No. 21 on Billboard in the United States, No. 15 on the Record World chart, No. 16 in Canada and the American Cashbox charts, and No. 19 in the United Kingdom. It was very successful in Australia, where it reached No. 4 on the charts. It has appeared on six compilation albums of Elvis Presley's recordings.

== Cover versions ==
The song was featured on the 1965 album Teen Beat Discotheque by the Living Guitars. The Cramps covered the song in their 1987 album Rockin n Reelin in Auckland New Zealand. In 1991, the song was spoofed by Dread Zeppelin in their song "Do The Claw".

== Sources ==
- Jorgensen, Ernst. Elvis Presley, A Life In Music. New York: St. Martin's Press, 1998; ISBN 0-312-18572-3
- Jorgensen, Ernst. Elvis by the Presleys. Liner Notes. BMG Heritage, 2005.
- Presley, Priscilla. Elvis by the Presleys. Liner Notes. BMG Heritage, 2005.
- Hopkins, Jerry. Elvis: A Biography. NY: Simon and Schuster, 1971.
- Victor, Adam. The Elvis Encyclopedia. Overlook Hardcover, 2008.
