= Antonio Prieto (Chilean singer) =

Chilean actor

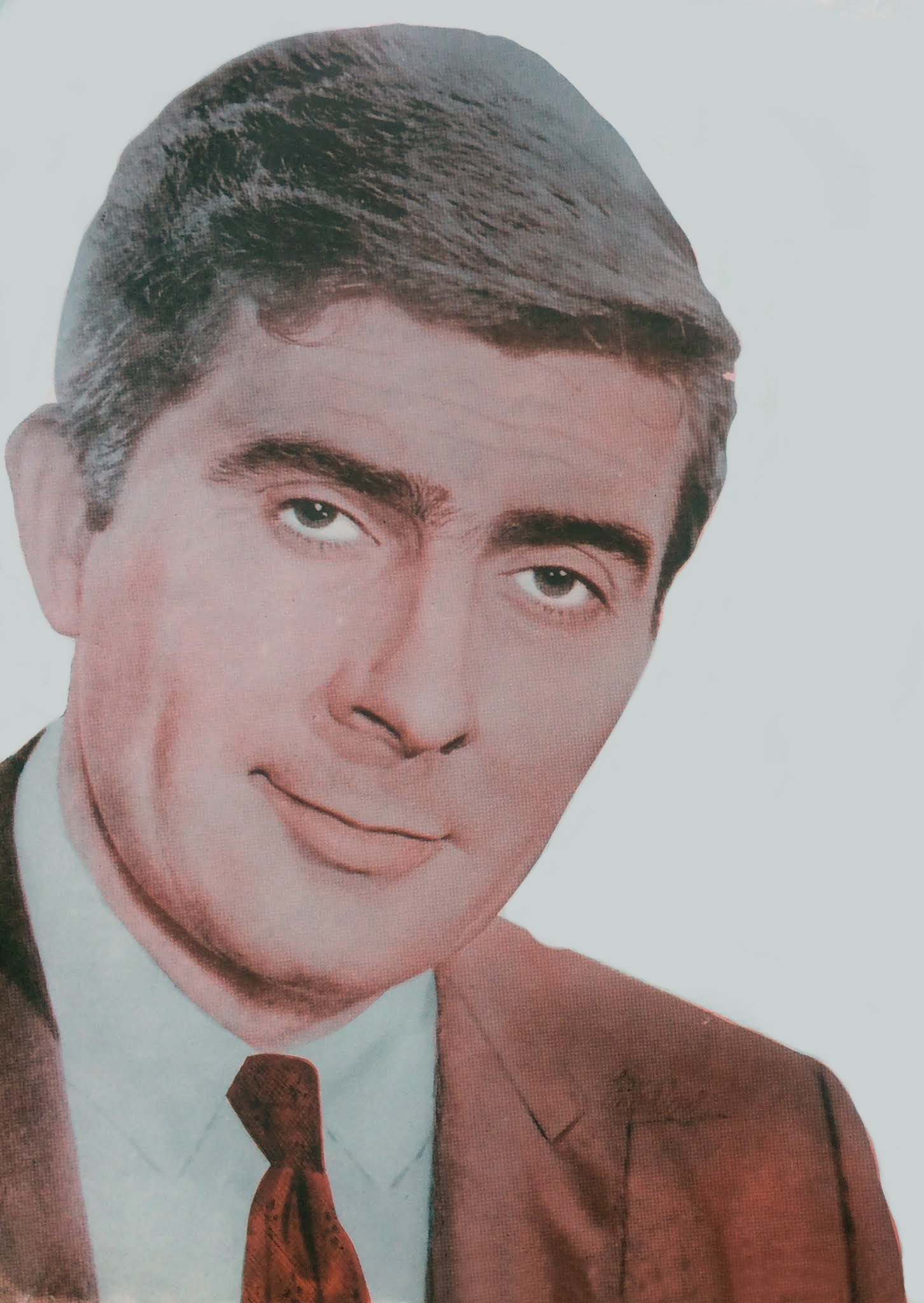
- Born: Juan Antonio Espinoza Prieto; 26 May 1926; Iquique, Chile
- Died: 14 July 2011 (aged 85); Santiago, Chile
- Occupations: Actor, singer
- Years active: 1954–68

Juan Antonio Espinoza Prieto (26 May 1926 – 14 July 2011) was a Chilean singer and actor.

Also a popular singer, he scored an international 1961 hit with "La novia", mostly known in English-speaking countries as "The Wedding". In 1995 a 20 Greatest Hits CD was released, which included such hits as "La novia" and "El milagro". He also made a very popular Spanish version of a song from the Italian singer Domenico Modugno.

Prieto also sang a popular ballad, "Juan Bobo", in homage to the popular Juan Bobo of Puerto Rican folklore.

== Partial filmography ==
- Juan Mondiola (1950)
- The Two Little Rascals (1961)
- La novia (1961)
- La boda (1964)
- El tímido (1965)
- La industria del matrimonio (1965) - (segment "Romántico")
- De profesión, sospechosos (1966) - Joaquin Frias
- Eroe vagabondo (1966)

== See also ==
- Nino Bravo
- Lucho Gatica
