= Tickle Me =

1965 film by Norman Taurog, starring Elvis Presley

- Theatrical release poster
- Directed by: Norman Taurog
- Written by: Elwood Ullman; Edward Bernds
- Produced by: Ben Schwalb
- Starring: Elvis Presley; Julie Adams; Jocelyn Lane; Jack Mullaney; Merry Anders; Bill Williams
- Cinematography: Loyal Griggs
- Edited by: Archie Marshek
- Music by: Walter Scharf
- Production company: Allied Artists Pictures
- Distributed by: Allied Artists Pictures
- Release date: June 3, 1965 (Atlanta)
- Running time: 91 minutes
- Country: United States
- Language: English
- Budget: $1.5 million
- Box office: $3.4 million (US/ Canada rentals) $5 million (worldwide)

Tickle Me is a 1965 American musical comedy Western film directed by Norman Taurog, written by Elwood Ullman and Edward Bernds, and starring Elvis Presley as a champion rodeo bull rider and bronco buster, with Julie Adams and Jocelyn Lane in supporting roles.

Presley won a 1966 Golden Laurel Award as best male actor in a musical film. It is the only Presley film released by Allied Artists Pictures, and it saved the studio from financial collapse and bankruptcy. The film made $5 million at the box office.

For the first and only time in a Presley film, the soundtrack had no new material, utilizing album cuts dating back as early as 1960. Some of these tracks were overdubbed for the film. In one case, a different take was used ("I Feel That I've Known You Forever", featuring what appears to be a vocal done on the soundstage). In another, a song was presented without the harmony vocal and narration of the original release ("I'm Yours"). The cost-cutting experiment of recycling older recordings would not be repeated by Presley. However, another song from its recycled soundtrack, "(Such an) Easy Question", peaked at #11 on the Billboard Hot 100 and #1 on the Billboard Easy Listening chart in July 1965.

== Plot ==
Lonnie Beale, an out-of-work rodeo star with a heart of gold, is trying to make ends meet until the season starts up again. He comes to the fictional Western town of Zuni Wells because a friend said that Lonnie could get a job on a ranch, but the friend cannot be found.

Having no other option, Lonnie begins singing in a local club, but he gets fired after a fight with one of the customers. Vera Radford sees his performance and offers him a job taking care of the horses at a ranch that she runs called the Circle-Z. However, the ranch is not what Lonnie had expected; it is a fitness salon referred to as Yogurt Gulch where actresses and models go to lose weight and get in shape.

After upsetting the staff a few times by disrupting activities with his singing, Lonnie follows Pam Meritt to the nearby ghost town of Silverado, where he learns that one of her relatives has hidden a treasure. They share a comical vision of what the town must have been like when it was still populated.

There is a brief interlude parodying Western films in which Lonnie becomes the Panhandle Kid, a milk-drinking cowboy, with Pam and ranch hand Stanley in costume as characters in the saloon.

Back at the ranch, people try to abduct Pam to find the location of the treasure, and they want a letter that Pam possesses. Lonnie defends Pam, and they begin a relationship, but matters are complicated when Vera throws herself at Lonnie and Pam walks in on them.

When rodeo season starts, Lonnie goes on the circuit. But because things were left unresolved with Pam, he is unable to do his job well. Every time he tries to call, she hangs up on him, and when he writes to her, she sends his letters back marked "Return to Sender" (an homage to a 1962 Presley hit). Eventually, Stanley finds Lonnie on the circuit and talks him into confronting Pam.

When the two reach the Circle-Z, Pam is on her way to Silverado, so they follow her. A fierce storm begins, so the trio spends the night in a hotel that seems to be haunted, as strange things happen to Pam and Stanley whenever Lonnie is not around. Eventually it is revealed that the ghosts and goblins in the hotel are actually masked men trying to capture Pam's treasure.

The men are unmasked, and the hiding place of the treasure is discovered. Lonnie and Pam get married, with a big reception at the Circle-Z. Stanley gets tangled up in the decorations behind their car. Lonnie sings to Pam as they drive off toward their honeymoon, dragging Stanley in a metal tub behind them.

== Cast ==
- Elvis Presley as Lonnie Beale / Panhandle Kid
- Julie Adams as Vera Radford
- Jocelyn Lane as Pamela Meritt
- Jack Mullaney as Stanley Potter
- Merry Anders as Estelle Penfield
- Connie Gilchrist as Hilda
- Barbara Werle as Barbara
- Edward Faulkner as Brad Bentley
- Allison Hayes as Mabel
- Bill Williams as Deputy Sturdivant
- Red West (uncredited) as Mabel's Boyfriend
- Diane Bond
- Francine York as Mildred
- Grady Sutton as Mr. Dabney
- Richard Reeves as Jim the bartender

== Production ==
By mid-1964, Allied Artists was a studio in financial trouble. Presley's management knew that Allied head Steve Broidy hoped that the profits from a new Presley vehicle would keep the studio solvent. On the suggestion of Colonel Parker, instead of recording a new soundtrack, previously issued LP tracks were used instead to save costs; this had not been done on any of Presley's earlier films.

The film was originally called Isle of Paradise. It was written by Edward Bernds and Elwood Ullman, who had written for The Three Stooges and the Bowery Boys.

Presley was paid $600,000 plus $150,000 in expenses and was allocated 50% of the profits. The below-the-line costs were estimated at $399,750; it went $6,650 over budget and finished at $406,400. This made Tickle Me the cheapest of Presley's films to date.

Although produced by Allied Artists, the film was actually made at Paramount Pictures Studios, which Allied hired for the duration of the shoot. It was shot over 23 days in October–November 1964, plus two days of second-unit photography.

== Reception ==
Howard Thompson of The New York Times called the film "the silliest, feeblest and dullest vehicle for the Memphis Wonder in a long time. And both Elvis and his sponsors, the time Allied Artists, should know better." Variety noted that the screenplay was "wispy thin" but allowed Presley to "rock over nine numbers from past albums to good effect." Kevin Thomas of the Los Angeles Times wrote that the film had "lousy color, cheap sets, hunks of stock footage, painted scenery and unconvincing process work. But who's to quibble when the movie is so much fun?" The Monthly Film Bulletin called it an "Exceptionally routine Presley vehicle" with "uninspired songs."

The film was popular at the box office, making over $3 million in the US and $5 million worldwide. It became the third highest-grossing film in the history of Allied Artists and saved the studio from bankruptcy.

== Awards ==
Presley won a 1966 Golden Laurel Award for best male performance in a musical film. This was the only acting award that he received during his film career.

== Home media ==
The film was first released in the VHS format in the early 1980s in a limited version from Allied Artists Home Video. The film was released on videocassette by Key Video in February 1985 as part of the release of 11 videos to mark the 50th anniversary of Presley's birth. It was issued again by CBS/Fox Video in 1987 and 1992, and by Warner Home Video in 1997. In 2007, Tickle Me was released for the first time on DVD, in widescreen letterbox format.

== See also ==
- List of American films of 1965
- Elvis Presley on film and television
