= From Nashville to Memphis: The Essential '60s Masters =

Box set by Elvis Presley
- Released: September 28, 1993
- Recorded: March 1960 – February 1969
- Genre: Rock
- Length: 5:44:14
- Label: RCA Records
- Producers: Ernst Mikael Jorgensen; Roger Semon

Elvis Presley chronology
The King of Rock 'n' Roll: The Complete 50's Masters (1992)	From Nashville to Memphis: The Essential '60s Masters (1993)	Amazing Grace: His Greatest Sacred Performances (1994)

Professional ratings
Review scores
Source	Rating
AllMusic	5/5 stars
Encyclopedia of Popular Music	5/5 stars
MusicHound	5/5 stars
The Rolling Stone Album Guide	5/5 stars
Rough Guides	4/5 stars

From Nashville to Memphis: The Essential '60s Masters is a five-disc box set compilation of studio master recordings by American singer and musician Elvis Presley during the decade of the 1960s; it was released in 1993 on RCA Records, catalogue number 66160-2. In its initial long-box release, it included a set of collectable stamps duplicating the record jackets of every Presley LP on RCA Victor, and those of the singles pertinent to this box set. The set also includes a booklet with an extensive session list and discography, as well as a lengthy essay by Peter Guralnick. It was certified Gold by the RIAA on November 30, 1993, and Platinum on January 6, 2004. This set followed an exhaustive box set of Presley's 1950s output and was followed by a collection of his soundtrack work and a more selective box set of his work in the 1970s.

== Contents ==
The box comprises every master recording made by Presley during the decade and released in his lifetime, with the exception of those made at sessions for movie soundtracks or for television broadcasts, with one exception in the latter case. The set also excludes Presley's gospel recordings and live performances, but does include songs that had been recorded at non-soundtrack sessions, but which were released on soundtrack albums in order to bring the album running-time to an acceptable length, such as the sessions of May 26 and May 27, 1963. As a result of these criteria, only two of Presely's 1960s original albums are represented in their entirety in the set: Elvis Is Back! and From Elvis in Memphis; all other Presley albums of the decade, with the exception of two gospel albums, included at least one film-derived recording, or in the case of From Memphis to Vegas/From Vegas to Memphis, live recordings.

The first four discs and the first nine tracks of the fifth disc present the studio masters in chronological session order, with the above noted exceptions. The opening eighteen tracks of the first disc contain Elvis Is Back! and its three attendant chart-topping singles, "Stuck on You", "It's Now or Never", and "Are You Lonesome Tonight?", along with their B-sides. The remainder of disc one and discs two and three include the highlights "Surrender", "His Latest Flame", "Little Sister", "Suspicion", "She's Not You", his cover of Bob Dylan's "Tomorrow Is a Long Time", and "U.S. Male". Disc three includes two previously unreleased recordings, an unreleased alternate take, and three unedited masters including a long version of the "Guitar Man" single that segues into "What'd I Say".

Disc four and the first nine tracks of disc five cover the entire released output of the Memphis sessions at American Sound Studio, yielding the albums From Elvis in Memphis and the studio disk of the double album From Memphis to Vegas/From Vegas to Memphis, along with various hit singles including his latter-day signature song, "Suspicious Minds". The remainder of disc five contains nine previously unreleased alternate takes, a version of Chuck Berry's "Memphis Tennessee" from an earlier session, an unreleased recording from the Memphis sessions, an undubbed version of his 1960 #1 hit single "It's Now or Never", and the duet medley of "Love Me Tender" and "Witchcraft" between Presley and Frank Sinatra, broadcast on Sinatra's ABC television special to welcome Elvis home after his service in the army ended by the spring of 1960.

RCA issued two similarly configured companions, a box set for the 1950s and another one for the 1970s. A separate two-disc set surveys highlights from the 1960s soundtracks. The two non-soundtrack studio albums from the 1960s whose contents do not appear on this box, His Hand in Mine and How Great Thou Art, were released in a similar two-disc set for the gospel recordings in 1994, Amazing Grace: His Greatest Sacred Performances.

The Sinatra/Presley duet was recorded at the Fontainebleau Hotel in Miami, Florida. All other recordings were made in Tennessee at either RCA Studio B in Nashville, or at American Studio in Memphis. Original recordings produced by Steve Sholes, Chet Atkins, Felton Jarvis, and Chips Moman.

== Track listing ==
Chart positions for LPs from Billboard Top Pop Albums chart; positions for singles from Billboard Pop Singles chart. Certain tracks listed as unreleased on the insert card of the jewel cases are unedited masters of issued tracks; those are indicated with an asterisk and listed with the original issue information for the released master. By late 1968, Billboard discontinued charting B-sides.

=== Disc one ===
Track	Song title	Writer(s)	Time	Recorded	Release date	Catalogue	Original LP Issue	Chart peak
1.	Make Me Know It	Otis Blackwell	2:31	1960-03-20	1960-04-08	LSP 2231	Elvis Is Back!	#2
2.	Soldier Boy	David Jones and Theodore Williams Jr.	1:55	1960-03-20	1960-04-08	LSP 2231	Elvis Is Back!	#2
3.	Stuck on You	Aaron Schroeder and J. Leslie McFarland	2:18	1960-03-20	1960-03-23	47-7740		#1
4.	Fame and Fortune	Fred Wise and Ben Weisman	2:30	1960-03-20	1960-03-23	47-7740b		#17
5.	A Mess of Blues	Doc Pomus and Mort Shuman	2:39	1960-03-20	1960-07-05	47-7777b		#32
6.	It Feels So Right	Fred Wise and Ben Weisman	2:31	1960-03-20	1960-04-08	LSP 2231	Elvis Is Back!	#2
7.	Fever	Otis Blackwell (as John Davenport), Eddie Cooley	2:58	1960-04-03	1960-04-08	LSP 2231	Elvis Is Back!	#2
8.	Like a Baby	Jesse Stone	2:24	1960-04-03	1960-04-08	LSP 2231	Elvis Is Back!	#2
9.	It's Now or Never	Eduardo di Capua, Aaron Schroeder, Wally Gold	3:15	1960-04-03	1960-07-05	47-7777		#1
10.	The Girl of My Best Friend	Beverly Ross and Sam Bobrick	2:21	1960-04-03	1960-04-08	LSP 2231	Elvis Is Back!	#2
11.	Dirty, Dirty Feeling	Jerry Leiber and Mike Stoller	2:12	1960-04-03	1960-04-08	LSP 2231	Elvis Is Back!	#2
12.	Thrill of Your Love	Stan Kesler	2:38	1960-04-03	1960-04-08	LSP 2231	Elvis Is Back!	#2
13.	I Gotta Know	Paul Evans and Matt Williams	2:15	1960-04-03	1960-11-01	47-7810b		#20
14.	Such a Night	Lincoln Chase	2:15	1960-04-03	1960-04-08	LSP 2231	Elvis Is Back!	#2
15.	Are You Lonesome Tonight?	Lou Handman and Roy Turk	3:05	1960-04-03	1960-11-01	47-7810		#1
16.	Girl Next Door Went A-Walking	Bill Rice and Thomas Wayne	2:24	1960-04-03	1960-04-08	LSP 2231	Elvis Is Back!	#2
17.	I Will Be Home Again	Bennie Benjamin, Raymond Leveen, Lou Singer	2:28	1960-04-03	1960-04-08	LSP 2231	Elvis Is Back!	#2
18.	Reconsider Baby	Lowell Fulson	3:39	1960-04-03	1960-04-08	LSP 2231	Elvis Is Back!	#2
19.	Surrender	Doc Pomus and Mort Shuman	1:51	1960-10-30	1961-02-07	47-7850		#1
20.	I'm Comin' Home	Charlie Rich	2:20	1961-03-12	1961-06-17	LSP 2370	Something for Everybody	#1
21.	Gently	Murray Wisell and Edward Lisbona	2:15	1961-03-12	1961-06-17	LSP 2370	Something for Everybody	#1
22.	In Your Arms	Aaron Schroeder and Wally Gold	1:50	1961-03-12	1961-06-17	LSP 2370	Something for Everybody	#1
23.	Give Me the Right	Fred Wise and Norman Blagman	2:32	1961-03-12	1961-06-17	LSP 2370	Something for Everybody	#1
24.	I Feel So Bad	Chuck Willis	2:53	1961-03-12	1961-05-02	47-7880		#5
25.	It's a Sin	Fred Rose and Zeb Turner	2:39	1961-03-12	1961-06-17	LSP 2370	Something for Everybody	#1
26.	I Want You With Me	Woody Harris	2:13	1961-03-12	1961-06-17	LSP 2370	Something for Everybody	#1
27.	There's Always Me	Don Robertson	2:16	1961-03-12	1961-06-17	LSP 2370	Something for Everybody	#1

=== Disc two ===
Track	Song title	Writer(s)	Time	Recorded	Release date	Catalogue	Original LP Issue	Chart peak
1.	Starting Today	Don Robertson	2:03	1961-03-12	1961-06-17	LSP 2370	Something for Everybody	#1
2.	Sentimental Me	James T. Morehead, James Cassin	2:31	1961-03-12	1961-06-17	LSP 2370	Something for Everybody	#1
3.	Judy	Teddy Redell	2:10	1961-03-12	1961-06-17	LSP 2370	Something for Everybody	#1
4.	Put the Blame on Me	Fred Wise, Kay Twomey and Norman Blagman	1:57	1961-03-12	1961-06-17	LSP 2370	Something for Everybody	#1
5.	Kiss Me Quick	Doc Pomus and Mort Shuman	2:46	1961-06-25	1962-06-05	LSP 2523	Pot Luck with Elvis	#4
6.	That's Someone You Never Forget	Red West and Elvis Presley	2:47	1961-06-25	1962-06-05	LSP 2523	Pot Luck with Elvis	#4
7.	I'm Yours	Hal Blair and Don Robertson	2:21	1961-06-25	1962-06-05	LSP 2523	Pot Luck with Elvis	#4
8.	(Marie's the Name) His Latest Flame	Doc Pomus and Mort Shuman	2:07	1961-06-25	1961-08-08	47-7908		#4
9.	Little Sister	Doc Pomus and Mort Shuman	2:30	1961-06-25	1961-08-08	47-7908b		#5
10.	For the Millionth and the Last Time	Roy C. Bennett and Sid Tepper	2:05	1961-10-15	1965-08-10	LSP 3450	Elvis for Everyone	#10
11.	Good Luck Charm	Aaron Schroeder and Wally Gold	2:23	1961-10-15	1962-02-27	47-7992		#1
12.	Anything That's Part of You	Don Robertson	2:04	1961-10-15	1962-02-27	47-7992b		#31
13.	I Met Her Today	Hal Blair and Don Robertson	2:42	1961-10-15	1965-08-10	LSP 3450	Elvis for Everyone	#10
14.	Night Rider	Doc Pomus and Mort Shuman	2:08	1961-10-15	1962-06-05	LSP 2523	Pot Luck with Elvis	#4
15.	Something Blue	Paul Evans and Al Byron	2:57	1962-03-18	1962-06-05	LSP 2523	Pot Luck with Elvis	#4
16.	Gonna Get Back Home Somehow	Doc Pomus and Mort Shuman	2:27	1962-03-18	1962-06-05	LSP 2523	Pot Luck with Elvis	#4
17.	(Such an) Easy Question	Otis Blackwell and Winfield Scott	2:18	1962-03-18	1962-06-05	LSP 2523	Pot Luck with Elvis	#4
18.	Fountain of Love	Bill Giant and Jeff Lewis	2:12	1962-03-18	1962-06-05	LSP 2523	Pot Luck with Elvis	#4
19.	Just for Old Time Sake	Roy C. Bennett and Sid Tepper	2:08	1962-03-18	1962-06-05	LSP 2523	Pot Luck with Elvis	#4
20.	You'll Be Gone	Red West, Charlie Hodge, Elvis Presley	2:23	1962-03-18	1965-02-09	47-8500b		
21.	I Feel That I've Known You Forever	Doc Pomus, Alan Jeffreys	1:39	1962-03-19	1962-06-05	LSP 2523	Pot Luck with Elvis	#4
22.	Just Tell Her Jim Said Hello	Jerry Leiber and Mike Stoller	1:51	1962-03-19	1962-07-17	47-8041b		#55
23.	Suspicion	Doc Pomus and Mort Shuman	2:34	1962-03-19	1962-06-05	LSP 2523	Pot Luck with Elvis	#4
24.	She's Not You	Doc Pomus, Jerry Leiber, Mike Stoller	2:08	1962-03-19	1962-07-17	47-8041		#5
25.	Echoes of Love	Bob Roberts and Paddy McMains	2:38	1963-05-26	1964-04-02	LSP 2894	Kissin' Cousins	#6
26.	Please Don't Drag That String Around	Otis Blackwell and Winfield Scott	1:53	1963-05-26	1963-06-18	47-8188b		
27.	(You're the) Devil in Disguise	Bernie Baum, Bill Giant and Florence Kaye	2:20	1963-05-26	1963-06-18	47-8188		#3
28.	Never Ending	Buddy Kaye and Philip Springer	1:57	1963-05-26	1964-07-14	47-8400b		
29.	What Now, What Next, Where To	Hal Blair and Don Robertson	1:56	1963-05-26	1967-06-01	LSP 3787	Double Trouble	#3
30.	Witchcraft	Dave Bartholomew and Pearl King	2:17	1963-05-26	1963-10-01	47-8243b		#32
31.	Finders Keepers, Losers Weepers	Dory Jones and Ollie Jones	1:47	1963-05-26	1965-08-10	LSP 3450	Elvis for Everyone	#10
32.	Love Me Tonight	Don Robertson	2:00	1963-05-26	1963-11-01	LSP 2756	Fun in Acapulco	#3

=== Disc three ===
Track	Song title	Writer(s)	Time	Recorded	Release date	Catalogue	Original LP Issue	Chart peak
1.	(It's a) Long Lonely Highway	Doc Pomus and Mort Shuman	2:20	1963-05-27	1964-04-02	LSP 2894	Kissin' Cousins	#6
2.	Western Union	Roy C. Bennett and Sid Tepper	2:09	1963-05-27	1968-05-01	LSP 3989	Speedway	#82
3.	Slowly but Surely	Sid Wayne and Ben Weisman	2:13	1963-05-27	1963-11-01	LSP 2756	Fun in Acapulco	#3
4.	Blue River	Paul Evans and Fred Tobias	1:32	1963-05-27	1965-12-03	47-8740b		#95
5.	Memphis, Tennessee	Chuck Berry	2:08	1964-01-12	1965-08-10	LSP 3450	Elvis for Everyone	#10
6.	Ask Me	Domenico Modugno, Bernie Baum, Florence Kaye, Bill Giant	2:05	1964-01-12	1964-09-22	47-8840		#12
7.	It Hurts Me	Joy Byers and Charlie Daniels	2:27	1964-01-12	1964-02-10	47-8307b		#29
8.	Down in the Alley	Jesse Stone	2:48	1966-05-25	1966-10-31	LSP 3702	Spinout	#18
9.	Tomorrow Is a Long Time	Bob Dylan	5:20	1966-05-25	1966-10-31	LSP 3702	Spinout	#18
10.	Love Letters	Edward Heyman and Victor Young	2:50	1966-05-26	1966-06-08	47-8870		#19
11.	Beyond the Reef	Jack Pitman	3:03	1966-05-26			previously unreleased	
12.	Come What May	Frank Tableporter	1:58	1966-05-28			unreleased alternate take	
13.	Fools Fall in Love	Jerry Leiber and Mike Stoller	2:04	1966-05-28	1967-01-10	47-9056b		
14.	Indescribably Blue	Darrell Glenn	2:47	1966-06-10	1967-01-10	47-9056		#33
15.	I'll Remember You*	Kui Lee	4:05	1966-06-10	1966-10-31	LSP 3702	Spinout	#18
16.	If Every Day Was Like Christmas	Red West	2:42	1966-06-10	1966-11-15	47-8950		
17.	Suppose	Sylvia Dee and George Goehring	3:01	1967-03-20			previously unreleased	
18.	Guitar Man / What'd I Say*	Jerry Reed / Ray Charles	2:57	1967-09-10	1968-01-09	47-9425		#43
19.	Big Boss Man	Luther Dixon and Al Smith	2:50	1967-09-10	1967-09-26	47-9341		#38
20.	Mine	Roy C. Bennett and Sid Tepper	2:35	1967-09-10	1968-05-01	LSP 3989	Speedway	#82
21.	Just Call Me Lonesome	Rex Griffin	2:05	1967-09-10	1967-10-10	LSP 3893	Clambake	#40
22.	Hi-Heel Sneakers*	Robert Higginbotham	4:46	1967-09-11	1968-01-09	47-9425b		
23.	You Don't Know Me	Cindy Walker and Eddy Arnold	2:27	1967-09-11	1967-09-26	47-9341b		#44
24.	Singing Tree	A. L. Owens and A.C. Solberg	2:17	1967-09-11	1967-10-10	LSP 3893	Clambake	#40
25.	Too Much Monkey Business	Chuck Berry	2:29	1968-01-15	1968-10	PRS 279	Elvis Sings Flaming Star	
26.	U.S. Male	Jerry Reed	2:42	1968-01-16	1968-02-28	47-9465		#28

=== Disc four ===
Track	Song title	Writer(s)	Time	Recorded	Release date	Catalogue	Original LP Issue	Chart peak
1.	Long Black Limousine	Bobby George, Vern Stovall	3:37	1969-01-13	1969-06-17	LSP 4155	From Elvis in Memphis	#13
2.	This Is the Story	Calvin Arnold, David Martin, Geoff Morrow	2:28	1969-01-13	1969-11	LSP 6020	From Memphis to Vegas / From Vegas to Memphis	#12
3.	Wearin' That Loved-On Look	A. L. Owens, Dallas Frazier	2:44	1969-01-13	1969-06-17	LSP 4155	From Elvis in Memphis	#13
4.	You'll Think of Me	Mort Shuman	3:58	1969-01-14	1969-08-26	47-9764b		
5.	A Little Bit of Green	Calvin Arnold, David Martin, Geoff Morrow	3:21	1969-01-14	1969-11	LSP 6020	From Memphis to Vegas / From Vegas to Memphis	#12
6.	Gentle on My Mind	John Hartford	3:20	1969-01-14	1969-06-17	LSP 4155	From Elvis in Memphis	#13
7.	I'm Moving On	Hank Snow	2:52	1969-01-14	1969-06-17	LSP 4155	From Elvis in Memphis	#13
8.	Don't Cry Daddy	Mac Davis	2:46	1969-01-15	1969-11-11	47-9768		#6
9.	Inherit the Wind	Eddie Rabbitt	2:56	1969-01-15	1969-11	LSP 6020	From Memphis to Vegas / From Vegas to Memphis	#12
10.	Mama Liked the Roses	Johnny Christopher	2:47	1969-01-15	1970-04-20	47-9835b		
11.	My Little Friend	Shirl Milete	2:43	1969-01-16	1970-01-29	47-9791b		
12.	In the Ghetto	Mac Davis	2:45	1969-01-20	1969-04-14	47-9741	From Elvis in Memphis	#3
13.	Rubberneckin'	Dory Jones, Bunny Warren	2:09	1969-01-20	1969-11-11	47-9768b		
14.	From a Jack to a King	Ned Miller	2:23	1969-01-21	1969-11	LSP 6020	From Memphis to Vegas / From Vegas to Memphis	#12
15.	Hey Jude	John Lennon and Paul McCartney	4:29	1969-01-21	1972-02-20	LSP 4671	Elvis Now	#43
16.	Without Love (There Is Nothing)	Danny Small	2:51	1969-01-22	1969-11	LSP 6020	From Memphis to Vegas / From Vegas to Memphis	#12
17.	I'll Hold You in My Heart (Till I Can Hold You in My Arms)	Eddy Arnold, Hal Horton, Thomas Dilbeck	4:32	1969-01-22	1969-06-17	LSP 4155	From Elvis in Memphis	#13
18.	I'll Be There	Bobby Darin	2:21	1969-01-22	1970-04	CAS 2408	Let's Be Friends	#105
19.	Suspicious Minds	Mark James	4:30	1969-01-22	1969-08-26	47-9764		#1
20.	True Love Travels on a Gravel Road	Dallas Frazier and A. L. Owens	2:37	1969-02-17	1969-06-17	LSP 4155	From Elvis in Memphis	#13
21.	Stranger in My Own Home Town	Percy Mayfield	4:23	1969-02-17	1969-11	LSP 6020	From Memphis to Vegas / From Vegas to Memphis	#12
22.	And the Grass Won't Pay No Mind	Neil Diamond	3:08	1969-02-17	1969-11	LSP 6020	From Memphis to Vegas / From Vegas to Memphis	#12
23.	Power of My Love	Bernie Baum, Bill Giant, Florence Kaye	2:34	1969-02-18	1969-06-17	LSP 4155	From Elvis in Memphis	#13

=== Disc five ===
Track	Song title	Writer(s)	Time	Recorded	Release date	Catalogue	Original LP Issue	Chart peak
1.	After Loving You	Johnny Lantz, Eddie Miller	3:05	1969-02-18	1969-06-17	LSP 4155	From Elvis in Memphis	#13
2.	Do You Know Who I Am?	Bobby Russell	2:47	1969-02-18	1969-11	LSP 6020	From Memphis to Vegas / From Vegas to Memphis	#12
3.	Kentucky Rain	Eddie Rabbitt, Dick Heard	3:14	1969-02-19	1970-01-29	47-9791		#16
4.	Only the Strong Survive	Jerry Butler, Leon Huff, Kenny Gamble	2:40	1969-02-19	1969-06-17	LSP 4155	From Elvis in Memphis	#13
5.	It Keeps Right On a-Hurtin'	Johnny Tillotson	2:36	1969-02-20	1969-06-17	LSP 4155	From Elvis in Memphis	#13
6.	Any Day Now	Burt Bacharach and Bob Hilliard	2:58	1969-02-20	1969-04-14	47-9741b	From Elvis in Memphis	
7.	If I'm a Fool (For Loving You)	Stan Kesler	2:43	1969-02-20	1970-04	CAS 2408	Let's Be Friends	#105
8.	The Fair Is Moving On	Guy Fletcher, Doug Flett	3:07	1969-02-21	1969-06-17	47-9747b	From Memphis to Vegas / From Vegas to Memphis	
9.	Who Am I?	Charles Rusty Goodman	2:07	1969-02-22	1971-03-22	CALX 2472	You'll Never Walk Alone	#69
10.	This Time / I Can't Stop Loving You	Chips Moman / Don Gibson	3:50	1969-02-17			previously unreleased	
11.	In the Ghetto	Mac Davis	2:46	1969-01-20			previously unreleased take	
12.	Suspicious Minds	Mark James	3:14	1969-01-22			previously unreleased take	
13.	Kentucky Rain	Eddie Rabbitt, Dick Heard	3:10	1969-02-19			previously unreleased take	
14.	Big Boss Man	Luther Dixon, Al Smith	3:36	1967-09-10			previously unreleased take	
15.	Down in the Alley	Jesse Stone	3:11	1966-05-25			previously unreleased take	
16.	Memphis, Tennessee	Chuck Berry	2:12	1963-05-27			previously unreleased	
17.	I'm Yours	Hal Blair, Don Robertson	2:17	1961-06-25			previously unreleased take	
18.	(Marie's the Name) His Latest Flame	Doc Pomus, Mort Shuman	2:00	1961-06-25			previously unreleased take	
19.	That's Someone You Never Forget	Red West, Elvis Presley	2:38	1961-06-25			previously unreleased take	
20.	Surrender	Doc Pomus, Mort Shuman	1:50	1960-10-30			previously unreleased take	
21.	It's Now or Never	Aaron Schroeder and Wally Gold	3:14	1960-04-03			previously unreleased version	
22.	Love Me Tender / Witchcraft	Vera Matson and Elvis Presley / Cy Coleman and Carolyn Leigh	1:42	1960-03-26			previously unreleased	

== Personnel ==
- Elvis Presley – vocals, guitar, piano
- Scotty Moore – guitar
- Hank Garland - guitar, bass
- Chip Young - guitar
- Neal Matthews - guitar
- Harold Bradley - guitar
- Grady Martin - guitar, vibes
- Jerry Reed - guitar
- Jerry Kennedy - guitar
- Charlie McCoy - guitar, harmonica, organ, trumpet
- Reggie Young - guitar
- Pete Drake - steel guitar
- Floyd Cramer - piano, organ
- David Briggs - piano, organ
- Gordon Stoker - piano
- Henry Slaughter - piano, organ
- Bobby Wood - piano
- Hoyt Hawkins - organ
- Bobby Emmons - organ
- Bob Moore - bass
- Henry Strzelecki - bass
- Tommy Cogbill - bass
- Mike Leech - bass
- D. J. Fontana - drums
- Buddy Harman – drums, timpani
- Gene Chrisman - drums
- Boots Randolph - saxophone, vibes, shakers
- Rufus Long - saxophone
- Ray Stevens - trumpet
- Ed Kollis - harmonica
- The Jordanaires - backing vocals
- The Imperials - backing vocals
- Millie Kirkham - backing vocals
- Dolores Edgin - backing vocals
- June Page - backing vocals
- Joe Babcock - backing vocals
- Mary Greene - backing vocals
- Charlie Hodge - backing vocals
- Ginger Holladay - backing vocals
- Mary Holladay - backing vocals
- Susan Pilkington - backing vocals
- Sandy Posey - backing vocals
- Donna Thatcher - backing vocals
- Hurschel Wiginton - backing vocals
