= Elvis Is Back! =

Studio album by Elvis Presley
- Released: April 8, 1960
- Recorded: March 20–April 4, 1960
- Studio: RCA Victor Studio B (Nashville)
- Genres: Rock and roll; pop; R&B; blues; rock
- Length: 31:54
- Label: RCA Victor
- Producers: Steve Sholes, Chet Atkins

Elvis Presley chronology
Elvis' Gold Records Volume 2 (1959)	Elvis Is Back! (1960)	G.I. Blues (1960)

Singles from Elvis Is Back!
- 1. "Such a Night" Released: July 14, 1964; 2. "The Girl of My Best Friend" Released: August 20, 1976

Elvis Is Back! is the fourth studio album by American singer Elvis Presley, released on April 8, 1960, by RCA Victor. It was Presley's first album of new material since 1958's King Creole soundtrack as well as his first to be recorded and released in stereophonic sound. The album marked Presley's return to music after his discharge from the U.S. Army.

During Presley's two-year military service in Germany, RCA Victor and Paramount Pictures progressively released material he had completed prior to enlistment. During his last months in the Army, Presley began preparing material and working on improving his performance for his first session in Nashville, scheduled to take place upon his return. Upon returning to the United States in March 1960, the singer reunited with guitarist Scotty Moore and drummer D.J. Fontana from his original band, the Blue Moon Boys, for two blocks of sessions in late March and early April. The material on the album has some influences from the rock and roll of Presley's early work, but it also offers a mix of sophisticated pop, blues, R&B and the "Nashville sound" production values associated with Chet Atkins, who co-produced the recording sessions with Steve Sholes.

With public anticipation high, RCA rushed Elvis Is Back! and the standalone single "Stuck on You" into release mere days after Presley finished recording. The LP topped the UK Albums Chart and reached number two in Billboard's Top LP's. Initially, the release received mixed reviews, but over subsequent years its critical reception became more positive, with critics generally praising its stylistic variety, production quality and mature sound. Elvis is Back! was certified Gold on July 15, 1999, by the Recording Industry Association of America.

== Background and Army years ==
Following his third and last appearance on the Ed Sullivan Show, Presley received a notice from the Memphis draft board on January 8, 1957. The board announced his 1A classification and his possible draft before the end of the year. During the first half of 1957, Presley had three number one hits with "Too Much", "All Shook Up", and "(Let Me Be Your) Teddy Bear". His second film, Loving You, opened on July 30 to box office success. His Christmas album was released on October 15, and his third film, Jailhouse Rock, opened on October 17.

On December 20, Presley received his draft notice. He was granted a deferment so he could finish the forthcoming film King Creole, which had already received an investment of $350,000 from Paramount Pictures and producer Hal Wallis. At the beginning of 1958, Presley's single "Don't" topped the charts.

Presley was inducted into the Army on March 24, 1958. Soon after starting basic training at Fort Hood, Texas, he received a visit from Eddie Fadal, a businessman he had met on tour in January 1956. According to Fadal, Presley "firmly believed" his career was finished. After completing training, he joined the 3rd Armored Division in Friedberg, Germany, on October 1.

Media reports echoed Presley's concerns about his career, but RCA Victor producer Steve Sholes and Freddy Bienstock of Hill and Range had carefully prepared for his two-year absence. Using unreleased material, they kept up a stream of regular, successful releases. Between his induction and discharge, Presley had ten top 40 hits, including "Wear My Ring Around Your Neck", the best-selling "Hard Headed Woman", and "One Night" in 1958, and "(Now and Then There's) A Fool Such as I" and the number one hit "A Big Hunk o' Love" in 1959. RCA Victor released four albums compiling old material during this period, most successfully Elvis' Golden Records (1958) (which rose to third position on the LP chart) and 50,000,000 Elvis Fans Can't Be Wrong.

== Return to music ==
During his final months in the Army, Presley started to experiment with new material and thinking ahead to his anticipated return to recording. For his first scheduled recording session, Presley considered The Four Fellows' "Soldier Boy", the Golden Gate Quartet's "I Will Be Home Again", The Drifters' "Such a Night" and Jesse Stone's "Like a Baby". His friend Charlie Hodge taught Presley techniques to improve his breathing and expand his range. For inspiration, Presley used Roy Hamilton's "I Believe" and his version of "Unchained Melody", the traditional Irish song "Danny Boy", and Tony Martin's "There's No Tomorrow" (an English adaptation of "'O sole mio"). Presley also studied the phrasing and notes of records by The Inkspots and the Mills Brothers. By the end of his time in Germany, Presley had added a full octave to his vocal range.

Presley returned to the United States on March 2, 1960, and was honorably discharged with the rank of sergeant on March 5. While Presley was in Germany, manager Colonel Tom Parker negotiated new terms with RCA Victor for Presley to fulfill his contractual obligations with film soundtracks. Parker also obtained an increase in Presley's salary and a profit share from producer Wallis and negotiated an appearance on The Frank Sinatra Show. Meanwhile, to assure publishing royalties, Bienstock commissioned new lyrics for "O Sole Mio" since the tune was already in the public domain.

== Recording ==
On March 20, Parker sent a chartered Greyhound bus to transport Presley and his entourage from Memphis, Tennessee to Nashville. The session personnel consisted of guitarist Scotty Moore, drummer D.J. Fontana, pianist Floyd Cramer, guitarist Hank Garland, bassist Bob Moore, percussionist Buddy Harman and the backing group the Jordanaires. Presley's original bassist Bill Black declined to join the sessions as he was enjoying success with the Bill Black Combo. To prevent possible disruption by fans, the musicians were initially told they were going to play on a Jim Reeves session. RCA executives Sholes and Bill Bullock were joined in the control booth by Parker, his assistant Tom Diskin, A&R head Chet Atkins, engineer Bill Porter and Hill and Range's Bienstock.

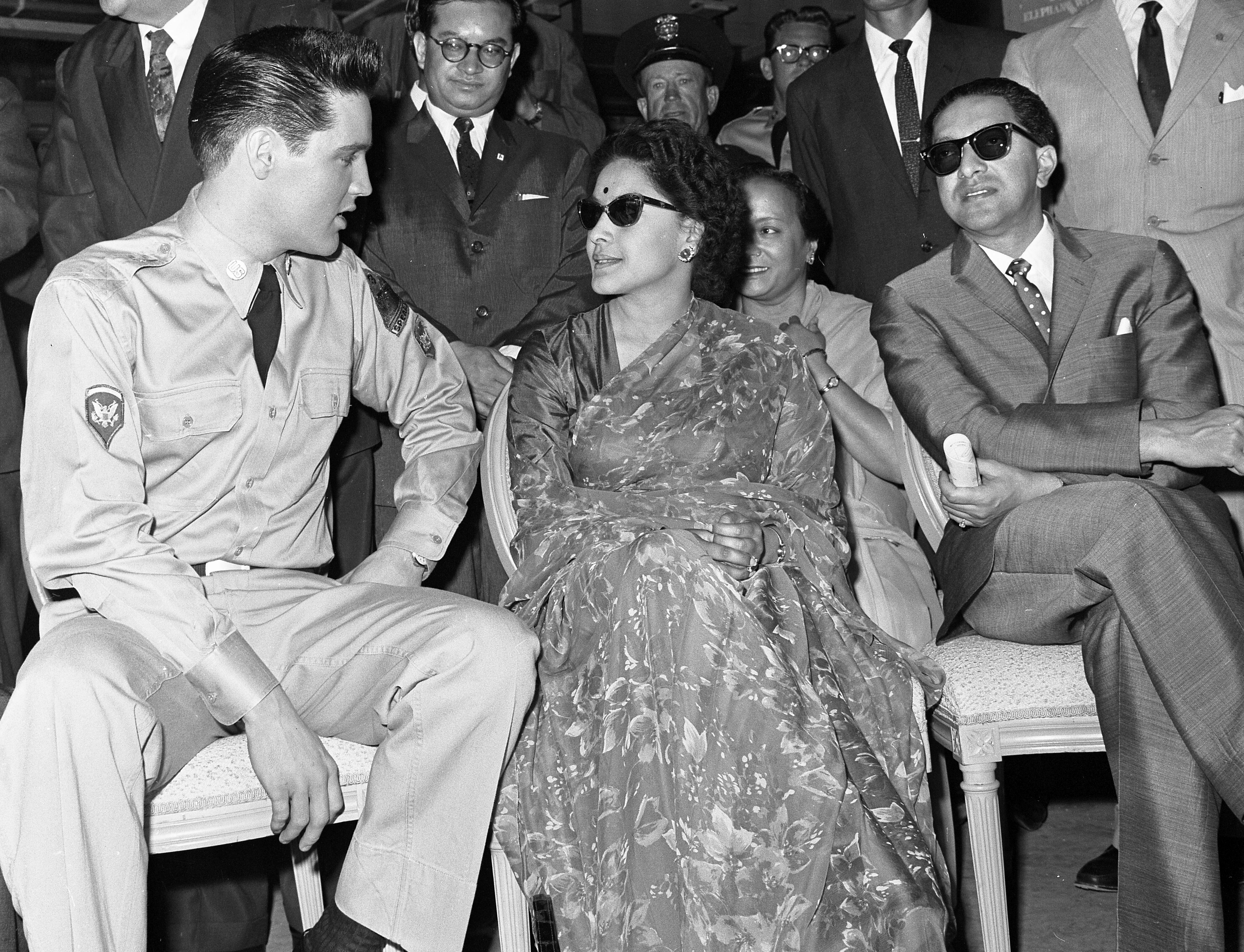
Presley in May 1960 with Queen Ratna of Nepal and King Mahendra of Nepal

RCA Victor's Studio B had recently been equipped with a new three-track recorder. To further improve the recording of Presley's voice, Porter had Telefunken U-47 microphones placed in the studio. The U-47 was the first condenser microphone that could switch between omnidirectional and cardioid patterns. The microphone could be used for vocals, instruments and full area coverage. The first song recorded was Otis Blackwell's "Make Me Know It", which was mastered in nineteen takes. "Soldier Boy" was later recorded in fifteen takes, followed by the non-album cuts "Stuck on You" and "Fame and Fortune". The last song recorded during the March session was a non-album cut, "A Mess of Blues". A new session was arranged for April. Presley then left for Miami, Florida, where he taped The Frank Sinatra Timex Show: Welcome Home Elvis.

The original musicians returned to the studio on the evening of April 3; they were joined by saxophonist Boots Randolph. Presley started the session with "Fever", accompanied only by the bass and drums. He followed with the reworded version of "O Sole Mio", now titled "It's Now or Never". After Presley failed several times to achieve the full voice ending of the song, Porter offered to splice it for him. Presley refused and tried the song until he achieved the desired ending. "Girl Next Door Went A-Walking", was recorded in ten takes, followed by "Thrill of Your Love". The non-album cut "Are You Lonesome Tonight?" was followed by "I Will Be Home Again"—a duet with Hodge. For the last song of the session, Lowell Fulson's "Reconsider Baby", Presley played the lead using his Gibson Super 400 guitar.

== Content ==
Elvis Is Back! represented a new sound for Presley; it moved him further toward pop music, a direction he continued to take over much of the decade. The album features a mixture of genres, including rock, rhythm and blues and pop ballads. Critics generally agreed that Presley had acquired a "deeper, harder voice quality", and said his interpretations were "increasingly sophisticated". The album includes a variety of material; Presley and the session musicians, known as "The Nashville A-Team", had the benefit of recording equipment that was state-of-the-art for its time. (Note: "Elvis had never been heard like this before, except perhaps by himself in his own head. There was new depth to his voice; his interpretations were increasingly sophisticated; the group was probably the best studio band in the business; the song selection was imaginative and varied, the technical quality excellent. Most surprising of all, the new album pointed in no one's musical direction".) Elvis Is Back! was the first Presley album to be released in stereo. The album's front cover shows Presley standing in front of a blue stage curtain, dressed in an Army trench coat and smiling as he glances to his left. The back cover features an image of Presley grinning; he is dressed in an Army regulation fatigue jacket and cap. The inside of the gatefold cover features fifteen photographs of Presley taken at various times during his Army service.

"Fever"
The second track of the album presents Presley closely following Peggy Lee's version of the song

"Reconsider Baby"
Closing the album, Presley covers Lowell Fulson's song

The album contains twelve tracks; it opens with "Make Me Know It". The second track is a cover of "Fever", which Presley based on Peggy Lee's version, although his recording incorporates finger-snapping and the sounds of the two percussionists are divided between the two channels of the stereo mix. On "The Girl of My Best Friend", Presley is supported with doo-wop backing vocals by The Jordanaires. The fourth track is "I Will Be Home Again", a slow ballad performed as a duet with Charlie Hodge. The fifth track is "Dirty, Dirty Feeling", a song characterized by its "raunchy rock sound" and satirical humor; it was written by Leiber and Stoller, and had been previously discarded from the soundtrack of King Creole. The final track on side one is "Thrill of Your Love", on which Presley is accompanied by Cramer on the piano.

The second side opens with "Soldier Boy", which features a change of key in the chorus. This is followed by "Such a Night", which has saxophone accompaniment by Randolph. The next track is the blues number "It Feels So Right", which features lead guitar and heavy use of percussion. The following track is "Girl Next Door Went A-Walking", which was brought in by Moore. The album closes with the rhythm and blues songs "Like a Baby" and "Reconsider Baby". Presley played the lead guitar on both tracks, the latter of which features long saxophone and piano solos.

== Release and reception ==
The first single from Elvis Is Back!, "Stuck on You", was released two days after its recording with "Fame and Fortune" on the B-side, attracting 1.4 million advanced orders. The pre-printed single sleeve said, "Elvis' 1st New Recording For His 50,000,000 Fans All Over The World". It was the first Presley single to be released in stereo.

Elvis Is Back! was released on April 8, 1960, in stereo and monaural versions. The album reached number two on Billboard's Top LP's and topped the UK Albums Chart. Despite this, its commercial performance was a disappointment, with fewer than 300,000 copies sold in the United States. The album was later certified Gold by the RIAA.

=== Initial reviews ===
Billboard magazine said, "Elvis is back and singing better than ever in the rock and roll style he made famous". The New York Times called the record "drab and lackluster". Referencing Presley's change of style, High Fidelity magazine said: "Presley obviously finds it hard to record his old gusto ... Perhaps [the recordings] are the first attempts to master new styles". HiFi/Stereo Review magazine also remarked on the change in Presley's style, calling the album "musically schizoid" despite deeming the overall recording "good". The review said Presley's ballads were "the worst he's ever made" but lauded "his former vitality" in the "commercial rockabilly romps".

=== Retrospective reviews ===
Professional ratings
Review scores
Source	Rating
AllMusic	4.5/5 stars
Daily Express	4/5 stars
Encyclopedia of Popular Music	4/5 stars
MusicHound	4/5
Music Story	4.5/5 stars
PopMatters	7/10 stars
Record Collector	4/5 stars
Rolling Stone	4.5/5 stars
The Rolling Stone Record Guide	4/5 stars
Rough Guides	5/5 stars

In his review for AllMusic, Bruce Eder wrote that the album "shows a mature Elvis Presley [who] displayed the rich, deep vocalizing that would challenge critics' expectations of Elvis Presley playing rhythm guitar throughout". Eder concluded that on Elvis Is Back!, Presley "comes off better than on any of his other albums since arriving at RCA". Will Hermes of Rolling Stone praised its "wildly varied material, revelatory singing, impeccable stereo sound". Writing for Rough Guides in 2004, Paul Simpson commented: "Among the 1800 or so records in Elvis's collection at Graceland is a copy of Elvis Is Back!, almost white from the number of times it was played. You can understand why this would be his favourite album." Simpson admired Presley's blues singing on "Like a Baby" and "Reconsider Baby", and added, "it's hard to believe that this commitment and exhilaration was to be heard only fitfully for most of the 1960s, often on songs buried on B-sides or as bonuses on dodgy soundtrack albums."

PopMatters's Steve Horowitz said the album helped Presley grow from "teen idol" to "adult entertainer". Horowitz continued: "Presley's voice was still strong and clear. He could belt out the blues one minute ... and then sound sophisticated the next ... without changing character." The Seattle Post-Intelligencer also gave a favorable review, saying, "Elvis Is Back! finds [Presley] demonstrating both versatility and an affinity for handling a range of song styles".

Writing in The Daily Telegraph in January 2015, Neil McCormick included Elvis Is Back! among the artist's essential works. McCormick wrote: "It is almost universally accepted that Elvis, who never saw active service, 'died' in the army. Yet Elvis Is Back ... is arguably Presley's masterpiece, in which he tackles ballads, blues, rock, pop and gospel with a quality of control that somehow makes his innate sensuality even more potent." Simon Gage of Britain's Daily Express described the album as "[Presley's] finest".

== Legacy ==
Critic Robert Dimery included the album in his book 1001 Albums You Must Hear Before You Die.

== Reissues ==
RCA first reissued the original 12 track album on compact disc in 1990, and again in 1999 with bonus tracks. In 1997, DCC Compact Classics released a limited edition CD of the album remastered from the original tapes. In 2005, Elvis is Back! was reissued on the Follow That Dream label in a 2 CD collection. This edition contains previously unreleased outtakes of the studio album and combines all previously issued versions of the masters and outtakes. Legacy Recordings released a remastered version of the album together with Something for Everybody in 2011.

== Track listing ==
=== Original release ===
Side one
No.	Title	Writer(s)	Recording date	Length
1.	"Make Me Know It"	Otis Blackwell	March 20, 1960	1:58
2.	"Fever"	John Davenport, Eddie Cooley	April 3, 1960	3:31
3.	"The Girl of My Best Friend"	Beverly Ross, Sam Bobrick	April 4, 1960	2:21
4.	"I Will Be Home Again"	Bennie Benjamin, Raymond Leveen, Louis C. Singer	April 4, 1960	2:33
5.	"Dirty, Dirty Feeling"	Jerry Leiber, Mike Stoller	April 4, 1960	1:35
6.	"Thrill of Your Love"	Stan Kesler	April 4, 1960	2:59

Side two
No.	Title	Writer(s)	Recording date	Length
1.	"Soldier Boy"	David Jones, Theodore Williams, Jr.	March 20, 1960	3:04
2.	"Such a Night"	Lincoln Chase	April 4, 1960	2:58
3.	"It Feels So Right"	Fred Wise, Ben Weisman	March 21, 1960	2:09
4.	"Girl Next Door Went A-Walking"	Bill Rice, Thomas Wayne	April 4, 1960	2:12
5.	"Like a Baby"	Jesse Stone	April 3, 1960	2:38
6.	"Reconsider Baby"	Lowell Fulson	April 4, 1960	3:39

=== 1999 reissue bonus tracks ===
Tracks 1–12 are from the original album
No.	Title	Writer(s)	Recording date	Length
13.	"Stuck on You" (originally issued as 47-7740, March 23, 1960, #1)	Aaron Schroeder, S. Leslie McFarland	March 21, 1960	2:18
14.	"Fame and Fortune" (originally issued as 47-7740b, March 23, 1960, #17)	Fred Wise, Ben Weisman	March 21, 1960	2:29
15.	"Are You Lonesome Tonight?" (originally issued as 47-7810, November 1, 1960, #1)	Lou Handman, Roy Turk	April 4, 1960	3:05
16.	"I Gotta Know" (originally issued as 47-7810b, November 1, 1960, #20)	Paul Evans, Matt Williams	April 4, 1960	2:15
17.	"A Mess of Blues" (originally issued as 47-7777b, July 5, 1960, #32)	Doc Pomus, Mort Shuman	March 21, 1960	2:39
18.	"It's Now or Never" (originally issued as 47-7777, July 5, 1960, #1)	Eduardo di Capua, Aaron Schroeder, Wally Gold	April 3, 1960	3:14

=== 2005 Follow That Dream reissue ===
Disc 1

From the original album release:
No.	Title	Length
1.	"Make Me Know It"
2.	"Fever"
3.	"The Girl Of My Best Friend"
4.	"I Will Be Home Again"
5.	"Dirty, Dirty Feeling"
6.	"The Thrill Of Your Love"
7.	"Soldier Boy"
8.	"Such A Night"
9.	"It Feels So Right"
10.	"Girl Next Door Went A'Walking"
11.	"Like A Baby"
12.	"Reconsider Baby"

The original singles released from the sessions:
No.	Title	Length
13.	"Stuck On You"
14.	"Fame And Fortune"
15.	"It's Now Or Never"
16.	"A Mess Of Blues"
17.	"Are You Lonesome Tonight?"
18.	"I Gotta Know" (including take 1*)

Alternate Takes:
No.	Title	Length
19.	"Make Me Know It" (take 1)
20.	"Fever" (take 1)
21.	"The Girl Of My Best Friend" (take 3)
22.	"Soldier Boy" (take 1)
23.	"Such a Night" (take 1)
24.	"It Feels So Right" (take 1)
25.	"Stuck on You" (take 1)
26.	"Fame And Fortune" (take 2)
27.	"It's Now Or Never" (take 1)
28.	"Are You Lonesome Tonight" (takes 1,2)

Disc 2

The March session:
No.	Title	Length
1.	"Make Me Know It" (take 3)
2.	"Make Me Know It" (takes 9*,10*,11)
3.	"Make Me Know It" (takes 17,18)
4.	"Soldier Boy" (takes 2*,3*,7)
5.	"Soldier Boy" (takes 9*,10)
6.	"Stuck On You" (takes 1-FS, 2)
7.	"Fame And Fortune" (takes 4*,5)
8.	"A Mess Of Blues" (take 1)
9.	"A Mess Of Blues" (takes 2*,3*)
10.	"It Feels So Right" (take 2)
11.	"It Feels So Right" (takes 4*,3)

The April Session:
No.	Title	Length
12.	"Fever" (takes 2*,3*-'f---' at end taken out)
13.	"Like A Baby" (take 1-FS/BD*)
14.	"Like A Baby" (take 2)
15.	"Like A Baby" (takes 3,4*)
16.	"It's Now Or Never" (take 2)
17.	"It's Now or Never" (takes 3,4*)
18.	"Girl Of My Best Friend" (takes 2*,4*,5*,6)
19.	"Girl Of My Best Friend" (take 9)
20.	"Dirty, Dirty Feeling" (take 1)
21.	"Dirty, Dirty Feeling" (takes 2*,3*-sp last chord from 4/m)
22.	"Thrill Of Your Love" (takes 1,2*,1-PB)
23.	"Such A Night" (takes 2,3,4*/5-sp)
24.	"Girl Next Door Went A'Walking" (takes 1,2,3)
25.	"Are You Lonesome Tonight" (takes 4*-FS,3*, wp 1/2-sp*)

*previously unreleased take

=== 2011 Legacy edition reissue ===
Disc one - Elvis is Back!
No.	Title	Writer(s)	Length
1.	"Make Me Know It"	Otis Blackwell	1:58
2.	"Fever"	John Davenport, Eddie Cooley	3:31
3.	"The Girl of My Best Friend"	Beverly Ross, Sam Bobrick	2:21
4.	"I Will Be Home Again"	Bennie Benjamin, Raymond Leveen, Lou Singer	2:33
5.	"Dirty Dirty Feeling"	Jerry Leiber, Mike Stoller	1:35
6.	"Thrill of Your Love"	Stan Kesler	2:59
7.	"Soldier Boy"	David Jones, Theodore Williams Jr.	3:04
8.	"Such A Night"	Lincoln Chase	2:58
9.	"It Feels So Right"	Fred Wise, Ben Weisman	2:09
10.	"Girl Next Door Went a-Walking"	Bill Rice, Thomas Wayne	2:12
11.	"Like A Baby"	Jesse Stone	2:38
12.	"Reconsider Baby"	Lowell Fulson	3:39
13.	"Stuck on You"	Aaron Schroeder, S. Leslie McFarland	2:18
14.	"Fame and Fortune"	Fred Wise, Ben Weisman	2:29
15.	"It's Now or Never"	Eduardo di Capua, Aaron Schroeder, Wally Gold	3:14
16.	"A Mess of Blues"	Doc Pomus and Mort Shuman	2:49
17.	"Are You Lonesome Tonight?"	Lou Handman, Roy Turk	3:05
18.	"I Gotta Know"	Paul Evans, Matt Williams	2:15
19.	"Surrender"	Doc Pomus, Mort Shuman	1:51

Disc two - Something for Everybody
No.	Title	Writer(s)	Length
1.	"There's Always Me"	Don Robertson	2:16
2.	"Give Me the Right"	Fred Wise, Norman Blagman	2:32
3.	"It's A Sin"	Fred Rose, Zeb Turner	2:39
4.	"Sentimental Me"	James T. Morehead, James Cassin	2:31
5.	"Starting Today"	Don Robertson	2:03
6.	"Gently"	Murray Wisell and Edward Lisbona	2:15
7.	"I'm Comin' Home"	Charlie Rich	2:20
8.	"In Your Arms"	Aaron Schroeder, Wally Gold	1:50
9.	"Put the Blame on Me"	Fred Wise, Kay Twomey, Norman Blagman	1:57
10.	"Judy"	Teddy Redell	2:10
11.	"I Want You with Me"	Woody Harris	2:13
12.	"I Slipped, I Stumbled, I Fell"	Fred Wise, Ben Weisman	1:35
13.	"I Feel So Bad"	Chuck Willis	2:53
14.	"(Marie's the Name of) His Latest Flame"	Doc Pomus, Mort Shuman	2:07
15.	"Little Sister"	Doc Pomus, Mort Shuman	2:30
16.	"Good Luck Charm"	Aaron Schroeder, Wally Gold	2:23
17.	"Anything That's Part of You"	Don Robertson	2:04

== Personnel ==
- Elvis Presley – lead vocals, acoustic guitar
- Scotty Moore – electric guitar
- Hank Garland – electric guitar, electric bass
- Bob Moore – double bass
- Floyd Cramer – piano
- D. J. Fontana – drums, percussion
- Buddy Harman – drums, percussion
- The Jordanaires – backing vocals
- Boots Randolph – saxophone
- Charlie Hodge – harmony and backing vocals (on "I Will Be Home Again")

== Charts ==
Weekly chart performance of Elvis is Back!
Chart (1960)	Peak position
UK Albums Chart	1
US Billboard Top Selling LP's	2

== Certifications ==
Region	Certification	Certified units/sales
United States (RIAA)	Gold	500,000^{^}
^{^} Shipments figures based on certification alone.
