= The 50 Greatest Love Songs =

Greatest hits album by Elvis Presley
- Released: September 11, 2001(UK); November 12, 2001 (USA and EUR)
- Recorded: January 11, 1956 – April 24, 1977
- Genre: Rock and roll; rockabilly; country; pop
- Length: 2:25:17
- Label: BMG; RCA
- Producer: Ernst Mikael Jorgensen; Roger Semon

The 50 Greatest Love Songs is a greatest hits collection by American rock and roll singer and musician Elvis Presley released on September 11, 2001.

The album is a double compilation release, featuring 50 of the greatest love songs recorded by Elvis. The first disc encompasses some of Elvis's greatest hits, whereas the second features more from Elvis' earlier period, including 10 Gold singles. All releases' covers are red, except for the British version, which is blue. The CD is notable for having printing and pressing information mistakes, as well as tracks duration incorrectly listed.

The 50 Greatest Love Songs was first released in UK, on September 11, 2001, and later released in Europe and USA, on November 12, 2001. That same year, the compilation was released in Asia, and Australia, where it put Elvis back into Top 30 for the first time in 20 years.

== Track listing ==
The 50 Greatest Love Songs – Disc one
No.	Title	Writer(s)	Producer(s)	Length
1.	"Always On My Mind"	Wayne Carson; Johnny Christopher; Mark James	Felton Jarvis	3:39
2.	"And I Love You So" (Alternate Take 1)	Don McLean	Felton Jarvis	3:50
3.	"Suspicious Minds"	Mark James	Chips Moman; Felton Jarvis	4:30
4.	"Don't Cry Daddy"	Mac Davis	Chips Moman	2:48
5.	"Are You Lonesome Tonight?"	Lou Handman; Roy Turk	Steve Sholes; Chet Atkins	3:07
6.	"Surrender"	Doc Pomus; Mort Shuman; Ernesto De Curtis	Steve Sholes	1:52
7.	"It's Now Or Never"	Wally Gold; Aaron Schroeder; Eduardo di Capua	Steve Sholes	3:15
8.	"The Wonder Of You"	Baker Knight	Steve Sholes	2:35
9.	"You've Lost That Loving Feeling"	Phil Spector; Barry Mann; Cynthia Weil	Nick Patrick	4:23
10.	"It's Impossible"	Armando Manzanero; Sid Wayne	Felton Jarvis	2:52
11.	"Until It's Time for You to Go"	Buffy Sainte-Marie	Steve Sholes	3:59
12.	"You Don't Have to Say You Love Me"	Vicki Wickham; Simon Napier-Bell; Pino Donaggio; Vito Pallavicini	Felton Jarvis	2:31
13.	"For The Good Times"	Kris Kristofferson	Felton Jarvis	3:12
14.	"Spanish Eyes"	Bert Kaempfert; Charles Singleton; Eddie Snyder	Felton Jarvis	2:23
15.	"There Goes My Everything"	Dallas Frazier	Felton Jarvis	2:59
16.	"Make the World Go Away"	Hank Cochran	Felton Jarvis	3:36
17.	"She Wears My Ring"	Felice Bryant; Boudleaux Bryant	Felton Jarvis	3:22
18.	"Unchained Melody"	Alex North; Hy Zaret	Felton Jarvis	2:31
19.	"It's Only Love"	Mark James; Steve Tyrell	Felton Jarvis	2:42
20.	"I Just Can't Help Believing"	Barry Mann; Cynthia Weil	Felton Jarvis	4:35
21.	"Let It Be Me"	Gilbert Bécaud; Manny Curtis; Pierre Delanoë	Felton Jarvis	3:26
22.	"Rags to Riches"	Richard Adler; Jerry Ross	Felton Jarvis	1:54
23.	"I've Lost You"	Ken Howard; Alan Blaikley	Felton Jarvis	3:30

The 50 Greatest Love Songs – Disc two
No.	Title	Writer(s)	Producer(s)	Length
1.	"Can't Help Falling In Love"	Hugo Peretti; Luigi Creatore; George David Weiss	Elvis Presley; Joseph Lilley	3:01
2.	"Hawaiian Wedding Song"	Charles E. King; Al Hoffman; Dick Manning	Steve Sholes	2:49
3.	"Fame And Fortune"	Fred Wise; Ben Weisman	Steve Sholes	2:31
4.	"Good Luck Charm"	Aaron Schroeder; Wally Gold	Steve Sholes	2:25
5.	"She's Not You" (Remastered)	Jerry Leiber; Mike Stoller; Doc Pomus	Steve Sholes; Chet Atkins	2:10
6.	"Suspicion"	Doc Pomus; Mort Shuman	Felton Jarvis	2:36
7.	"The Girl Of My Best Friend"	Beverly Ross; Sam Bobrick	Steve Sholes; Chet Atkins	2:22
8.	"The Thrill of Your Love"	Stan Kesler	Steve Sholes; Chet Atkins	3:00
9.	"Pocketful of Rainbows"	Fred Wise; Ben Weisman	Joseph Lilley	2:34
10.	"There's Always Me"	Don Robertson	Steve Sholes; Urban Thielmann	2:18
11.	"Love Letters"	Edward Heyman; Victor Young	Steve Sholes	2:51
12.	"I'll Remember You"	Kui Lee	Steve Sholes; Chet Atkins	4:07
13.	"It Hurts Me"	Joy Byers; Charles E. Daniels	Chet Atkins	2:29
14.	"You Don't Know Me"	Eddy Arnold; Cindy Walker	Jeff Alexander; Felton Jarvis	2:29
15.	"Love Me Tender"	George R. Poulton; Ken Darby; Elvis Presley	Ernie Oehlrich; Thorne Norgar	2:44
16.	"True Love"	Cole Porter	Steve Sholes	2:06
17.	"I Was The One"	Aaron Schroeder; Bill Peppers; Claude Demetrius; Hal Blair	Steve Sholes	2:35
18.	"I Want You, I Need You, I Love You"	Tom Hamilton (uncredited); Maurice Mysels; Ira Kosloff	Steve Sholes	2:41
19.	"Loving You"	Jerry Leiber and Mike Stoller	Steve Sholes	2:13
20.	"Love Me"	Jerry Leiber and Mike Stoller	Steve Sholes	2:45
21.	"Old Shep"	Red Foley; Arthur Williamsen	Steve Sholes	4:11
22.	"That's When Your Heartaches Begin"	Fred Fisher; William Raskin; Billy Hill	Steve Sholes	3:23
23.	"Young and Beautiful"	Aaron Schroeder; Abner Silver	Jeffrey Alexander	2:03
24.	"Don't Ask Me Why"	Fred Wise; Ben Weisman	Walter Scharf; Phil Khagan	2:07
25.	"As Long As I Have You"	Fred Wise; Ben Weisman	Walter Scharf; Phil Khagan	1:51
26.	"Don't"	Jerry Leiber and Mike Stoller	Jerry Leiber and Mike Stoller	2:50
27.	"(Now and Then There's) A Fool Such as I"	Bill Trader	Steve Sholes	2:36
Total length:				2:25:17

== Formats ==
- US cassette edition – 2-tape edition containing 50 songs.
- CD UK edition – 2-disc edition containing 50 songs, blue cover.
- CD Europe and US edition – 2-disc edition containing 50 songs, red cover.
- Digital download – Digital edition, containing the same 50 songs from the cassette and CD edition.

== Personnel ==
Credits adapted from the album's liner notes.

=== Production ===
- Project Director – Victoria Sarro
- Compilation – Ernst Mikael Jorgensen Roger Semon
- Digital Engineer – Dennis Farrante

=== Design ===
- Photography – Joseph A. Tunzi

=== Companies ===
- Licensed From – Sony BMG Music Entertainment, RCA

== Charts ==
=== Weekly charts ===
Chart (2001)	Peak position
Australian Albums (ARIA)	23
Finnish Albums (Suomen virallinen lista)	26
German Albums (Offizielle Top 100)	70
Irish Albums (IRMA)	28
Scottish Albums (Official Charts)	22
Swedish Albums (Sverigetopplistan)	18
UK Albums (Official Charts)	21
US Billboard 200	150

=== Year-end charts ===
Chart (2001)	Position
Swedish Albums (Sverigetopplistan)	76

== Certifications ==
Region	Certification	Certified units/sales
Australia (ARIA)	Gold	35,000^{^}
Sweden (GLF)	Gold	40,000^{^}
United Kingdom (BPI)	Gold	100,000^{*}
United States (RIAA)	Gold	500,000^{^}
^{*} Sales figures based on certification alone.^{^} Shipments figures based on certification alone.
