= Something for Everybody =

Studio album by Elvis Presley
- Released: May 19, 1961
- Recorded: November 8, 1960; March 12–13, 1961
- Studio: Radio Recorders (Hollywood); RCA Studio B (Nashville)
- Genre: Pop, rock and roll
- Length: 26:01
- Label: RCA Victor
- Producer: Steve Sholes (except "I Slipped, I Stumbled, I Fell," Urban Thielmann)

Elvis Presley chronology
Elvis by Request (1961)	Something for Everybody (1961)	Blue Hawaii (1961)

Professional ratings
Review scores
Source	Rating
AllMusic	3/5 stars
MusicHound	2.5/5 stars
New Record Mirror	5/5
Rough Guides (1999 reissue)	4/5 stars

Something for Everybody is the sixth studio album by American singer and musician Elvis Presley, released on RCA Victor in mono and stereo, LPM/LSP 2370, in May 1961. Recording sessions took place on November 8, 1960, at Radio Recorders in Hollywood, and on March 12, 1961 at RCA Studio B in Nashville, Tennessee. In the United States, it peaked at number 1 on Billboard's Top Pop LPs chart. It was certified Gold on July 15, 1999 by the Recording Industry Association of America. The album remained at #1 for three weeks.

== Background ==
After his military discharge from the army in March 1960, any doubts about Presley's ability to recapture the momentum of his career in the 1950s were laid to rest. During that year his three singles all topped the charts, and his first album, Elvis Is Back!, went to number 2 on the albums chart. His musical film G.I. Blues was wildly successful, its soundtrack album also going to number 1.

== Content ==
Side one of the record contains slow, sentimental love ballads, while side two features uptempo rock and roll and R&B, hence the album's title.

Presley entered the familiar Studio B in Nashville on March 12, 1961 and recorded eleven of the tracks for this album in one twelve-hour session, in addition to the single "I Feel So Bad". The single was initially scheduled to be the twelfth track for the album, but Presley chose, after RCA executive Bill Bullock overruled the Colonel who wanted "Wild In The Country" paired with "I Slipped, I Stumbled, I Fell" as the single, it to accompany the title track to the film Wild in the Country as the promotional 45 for the film. Another track that had appeared in the film but not released commercially on records, "I Slipped, I Stumbled, I Fell", became the final track for the album.

== Reissues ==
RCA first reissued the original 12 track album on compact disc in 1989. The July 13, 1999 CD reissue included six bonus tracks, four singles and two b-sides recorded over the span of a year and issued in 1961 and 1962, and altered the album's running order. All of the sides made the Top 40 at a time when Billboard charted B-sides as well, and two of the singles, "Surrender" and "Good Luck Charm", topped the singles chart. "Surrender" had been recorded at the sessions for Presley's gospel album of 1960, His Hand in Mine, and the sides for 47-7908 and 47-7992 at sessions specifically to produce singles. The entirety of the 1999 reissue appeared on the Legacy Edition reissue of Elvis Is Back! released in 2011. Bonus tracks were all recorded at Studio B in Nashville.

In 2006 Something for Everybody was reissued on the Follow That Dream label as a special 2-disc CD collection containing the original tracks along with numerous alternate takes.

== Track listing ==
=== Original release ===
Side one: 'The Ballad Side'
No.	Title	Writer(s)	Recording date	Length
1.	"There's Always Me"	Don Robertson	March 12, 1961	2:16
2.	"Give Me the Right"	Fred Wise, Norman Blagman	March 12, 1961	2:32
3.	"It's a Sin"	Fred Rose and Zeb Turner	March 12, 1961	2:39
4.	"Sentimental Me"	James T. Morehead, James Cassin	March 13, 1961	2:31
5.	"Starting Today"	Don Robertson	March 13, 1961	2:03
6.	"Gently"	Murray Wisell, Edward Lisbona	March 12, 1961	2:15

Side two: 'The Rhythm Side'
No.	Title	Writer(s)	Recording date	Length
1.	"I'm Comin' Home"	Charlie Rich	March 12, 1961	2:20
2.	"In Your Arms"	Aaron Schroeder, Wally Gold	March 12, 1961	1:50
3.	"Put the Blame On Me"	Fred Wise, Kay Twomey, Norman Blagman	March 13, 1961	1:57
4.	"Judy"	Teddy Redell	March 13, 1961	2:10
5.	"I Want You with Me"	Woody Harris	March 12, 1961	2:13
6.	"I Slipped, I Stumbled, I Fell"	Fred Wise, Ben Weisman	November 8, 1960	1:35

=== 1999 reissue with bonus tracks ===
Positions for single releases are from Billboard's Pop Singles chart.
No.	Title	Writer(s)	Recording date	Length
1.	"Surrender" (released February 7, 1961, RCA 47-7850, #1)	Doc Pomus and Mort Shuman	October 30, 1960	1:51
2.	"There's Always Me"	Don Robertson	March 12, 1961	2:16
3.	"Give Me the Right"	Fred Wise and Norman Blagman	March 12, 1961	2:32
4.	"It's a Sin"	Fred Rose and Zeb Turner	March 12, 1961	2:39
5.	"Sentimental Me"	James T. Morehead and James Cassin	March 13, 1961	2:31
6.	"Starting Today"	Don Robertson	March 13, 1961	2:03
7.	"Gently"	Murray Wisell and Edward Lisbona	March 12, 1961	2:15
8.	"I'm Coming Home"	Charlie Rich	March 12, 1961	2:20
9.	"In Your Arms"	Aaron Schroeder and Wally Gold	March 12, 1961	1:50
10.	"Put the Blame On Me"	Fred Wise, Kay Twomey, Norman Blagman	March 13, 1961	1:57
11.	"Judy"	Teddy Redell	March 13, 1961	2:10
12.	"I Want You With Me"	Woody Harris	March 12, 1961	2:13
13.	"I Feel So Bad" (May 2, 1961, RCA 47-7880, #5)	Chuck Willis	March 12, 1961	2:53
14.	"(Marie's the Name) His Latest Flame" (August 8, 1961, RCA 47-7908, #4)	Doc Pomus and Mort Shuman	June 25, 1961	2:07
15.	"Little Sister" (August 8, 1961, RCA 47-7908b, #5)	Doc Pomus and Mort Shuman	June 25, 1961	2:30
16.	"Good Luck Charm" (February 27, 1962, RCA 47-7992, #1)	Aaron Schroeder and Wally Gold	October 15, 1961	2:23
17.	"Anything That's Part of You" (February 27, 1962, RCA 47-7992b, #31)	Don Robertson	October 15, 1961	2:04
18.	"I Slipped, I Stumbled, I Fell"	Fred Wise and Ben Weisman	November 8, 1960	1:35

=== 2006 Follow That Dream CD reissue ===
The Album
No.	Title	Length
1.	"There's Always Me"	2:19
2.	"Give Me The Right"	2:36
3.	"It's a Sin"	2:44
4.	"Sentimenal Me"	2:34
5.	"Starting Today"	2:06
6.	"Gently"	2:18
7.	"I'm Comin' Home"	2:24
8.	"In Your Arms"	1:52
9.	"Put The Blame On Me"	2:00
10.	"Judy"	2:14
11.	"I Want You With Me"	2:15
12.	"I Slipped, I Stumbled, I Fell"	1:39

The Singles
No.	Title	Length
13.	"I Feel So Bad"	2:55
14.	"Little Sister"	2:33
15.	"(Marie's The Name Of) His Latest Flame"	2:09
16.	"Good Luck Charm"	2:26
17.	"Anything That's Part Of You"	2:07

First Takes
No.	Title	Length
18.	"There's Always Me" (take 1*)	2:27
19.	"Give Me The Right" (take 1)	3:00
20.	"It's a Sin" (takes 1*, 2)	3:58
21.	"Sentimental Me" (Take 1)	2:42
22.	"Starting Today" (take 1)	2:11
23.	"Gently" (takes 1, 2)	2:46
24.	"I'm Comin' Home" (take 2)	2:42
25.	"In Your Arms" (take 1)	2:13
26.	"Put The Blame On Me" (takes 1, 2)	2:52
27.	"Judy" (take 1)	3:16
28.	"I Want You With Me" (take 1)	2:26
29.	"Little Sister" (take 3)	2:55
30.	"(Marie's The Name Of) His Latest Flame" (take 2)	2:26
31.	"Anything That's Part Of You" (take 1)	2:17

Album Session Outtakes
No.	Title	Length
1.	"I'm Coming Home" (takes 1*, 3)	3:24
2.	"I'm Coming Home" (takes 5*, 4)	4:40
3.	"Gently" (take 3)	2:33
4.	"Gently" (take 4*)	2:25
5.	"Give Me The Right" (takes 3*, 2)	3:14
6.	"I Feel So Bad" (take 1)	3:00
7.	"There's Always Me" (take 2)	2:34
8.	"There's Always Me" (take 4)	2:49
9.	"Starting Today" (take 2)	2:12
10.	"Judy" (takes 2*, 3)	2:42
11.	"Judy" (take 4)	2:00

Singles Sessions Outtakes
No.	Title	Length
12.	"(Marie's The Name Of) His Latest Flame" (take 1)	2:44
13.	"(Marie's The Name Of) His Latest Flame" (takes 3, 4)	2:27
14.	"(Marie's The Name Of) His Latest Flame" (takes 5, 6)	4:03
15.	"Little Sister" (takes 1, 2, 4, 5)	2:03
16.	"Little Sister" (take 6)	2:36
17.	"Good Luck Charm" (take 1)	2:48
18.	"Good Luck Charm" (takes 2*, 3*)	1:50
19.	"Anything That's Part Of You" (take 2)	2:14
20.	"Anything That's Part Of You" (takes 4, 5)	2:35
21.	"Anything That's Part Of You" (take 8)	2:27

Last Takes
No.	Title	Length
22.	"There's Always Me" (takes 5*, 6*, 7*, 8*, 9)	4:17
23.	"Judy" (takes 5, 6*, 7*)	4:24
24.	"(Marie's The Name Of) His Latest Flame" (takes 10*, 11*, 12)	3:42
25.	"Little Sister" (takes 7*, 8*, 9)	4:17
26.	"Anything That's Part Of You" (take 9*)	2:15

Note

- * signifies previously unreleased

== Personnel ==
On March 12–13, 1961

- Elvis Presley – vocals, acoustic rhythm guitar
- Millie Kirkham – backing vocals
- The Jordanaires (Gordon Stoker, Hoyt Hawkins, Neal Matthews, Ray Walker) – backing vocals
- Boots Randolph – saxophone
- Scotty Moore – electric guitar
- Hank Garland – electric guitar, electric bass
- Floyd Cramer – piano
- Bob Moore – double bass
- D.J. Fontana – drums
- Buddy Harman – drums

On November 8, 1960

- Elvis Presley – vocals, acoustic rhythm guitar
- The Jordanaires (Gordon Stoker, Hoyt Hawkins, Neal Matthews, Ray Walker) – backing vocals
- Scotty Moore – electric rhythm guitar
- Tiny Timbrell – lead guitar
- Dudley Brooks – piano
- Meyer Rubin – double bass
- D.J. Fontana – drums

== Charts ==
Year	Chart	Position
1961	Billboard Pop Albums (Billboard 200) (mono)	1

== See also ==
- The Nashville A-Team
