= Flaming Star (disambiguation) =

Flaming Star may refer to:

- Flaming Star, a 1960 western film starring Elvis Presley
  - "Flaming Star" (song), a song by Elvis Presley, the title song from the above-mentioned film
  - Flaming Star (EP), an EP by Elvis Presley, containing two songs from the above-mentioned film

== Other ==
- Flaming Star, a novel by Clair Huffaker
- Flaming Star, a 2001 album by Sally Oldfield
- "Flaming Star", a 1983 song by Edward Reekers

== See also ==
- Elvis Sings Flaming Star, a 1968 album by Elvis Presley
