= Something for Everybody (disambiguation) =

Something for Everybody is a 1961 album by Elvis Presley

Something for Everybody may also refer to:

- Something for Everybody (Baz Luhrmann album), 1998
- Something for Everybody (Devo album), 2010

== See also ==
- Something for Everyone, a 1970 film starring Angela Lansbury
