= Starting Today =

Starting Today may refer to:

- "Starting Today" (Elvis Presley song), 1961
- "Starting Today" (Nina Sky song), 2009
- "Starting Today", song by Ronnie Milsap from his 1989 album Stranger Things Have Happened
- "Starting Today", song by Natalie Imbruglia from 2005 album Counting Down The Days
