= There's No Room in My Heart for the Blues =

Single by Hank Williams
- B-side: "I Wish I Had a Nickel"
- Released: 1956
- Recorded: August 1948–May 1949, Shreveport
- Genre: Country, gospel
- Length: 2:17
- Label: MGM
- Songwriter(s): Fred Rose, Zeb Turner

"There's No Room in My Heart for the Blues" is a song by Hank Williams. It was released as a posthumous single in 1956 by MGM Records. The song was written by Williams' producer Fred Rose and guitarist Zeb Turner, who played on several of Hank's recordings. The release was drawn from a Williams performance on KWKH in Shreveport, Louisiana as part of the Johnny Fair Syrup radio show. Lyrically, the song expresses the desire on the narrator's part for an amicable breakup, if one should ever occur, but Williams gentle delivery infuses the song with a sense of foreboding and sad inevitability.
