= Elvis by Request: Flaming Star and 3 Other Great Songs =

Elvis By Request

EP by Elvis Presley
- Released: April 21, 1961
- Recorded: April 3 – October 7, 1960
- Studio: Radio Recorders (Hollywood)
- Length: 11:02
- Label: RCA Victor
- Producer: Urban Thielmann

Elvis Presley chronology
| His Hand in Mine (1960) | Elvis By Request (1961) | Something for Everybody (1961) |

Elvis by Request: Flaming Star and 3 Other Great Songs is an EP by American singer Elvis Presley, containing two songs from the motion picture Flaming Star ("Flaming Star" and "Summer Kisses Winter Tears", the latter cut from the final print) and two of his earlier hits on the reverse side.

== Recording and releases ==
Recording sessions took place on August 8 and October 7, 1960, at Radio Recorders in Hollywood. Initially, four songs were composed for the movie, but "Britches" and "Summer Kisses Winter Tears" were dropped. The soundtrack music in the film consists of only two songs, "Flaming Star" and "A Cane and a High Starched Collar." An early version of "Flaming Star," using the film's working title "Black Star," was recorded by Presley and later released in the 1990s. The lyrics of the "Black Star" version were seen by some commentators as part of the reference of David Bowie's Blackstar. Both Presley and Bowie share the same birthday (January 8).

Two months after the film's premiere, RCA released the extended play single Elvis By Request – Flaming Star, catalogue LPC 128, which peaked at No. 14 on the Billboard Hot 100. It contained the title track and one of the rejected songs, "Summer Kisses, Winter Tears," along with two of Presley's chart-topping 1960 singles, "Are You Lonesome Tonight?" and "It's Now or Never." "Summer Kisses" would appear on the anniversary compilation album Elvis for Everyone five years later, and "A Cane and a High Starched Collar" would be released on Elvis: A Legendary Performer Volume 2. Finally, "Britches" saw release on Elvis: A Legendary Performer Volume 3 in 1979.

The song "Flaming Star" would be the title track of Elvis Sings Flaming Star, available at first only through select retail stores featuring products by the Singer sewing machine company as a promotional tie-in with Presley's 1968 Christmas television special, which Singer had sponsored. This album would begin the series of Presley budget releases on the RCA Camden subsidiary label.

Elvis by Request is the only Presley EP to play at 33 1/3 rpm. All of his other EPs were 45 rpm.

== Track listing ==
Side one
| No. | Title | Writer(s) | Recording date | Length |
|---|---|---|---|---|
| 1. | "Flaming Star" (from the film Flaming Star) | Sherman Edwards and Sid Wayne | October 7, 1960 | 2:25 |
| 2. | "Summer Kisses Winter Tears" (unused song from the film Flaming Star) | Ben Weisman, Fred Wise, Jack Lloyd | August 8, 1960 | 2:17 |

Side two
| No. | Title | Writer(s) | Recording date | Length |
|---|---|---|---|---|
| 1. | "Are You Lonesome Tonight?" | Lou Handman and Roy Turk | April 4, 1960 | 3:05 |
| 2. | "It's Now or Never" | Eduardo di Capua, Aaron Schroeder, Wally Gold | April 3, 1960 | 3:15 |

== Personnel ==
Credits for “Flaming Star” and “Summer Kisses, Winter Tears” only.

- Elvis Presley – vocals
- The Jordanaires – background vocals
- Howard Roberts – electric guitars
- Tiny Timbrell – acoustic guitars
- Jimmie Haskell – accordion
- Dudley Brooks – piano
- Myer Rubin – double bass
- Bernie Mattinson – drums
