= That's Someone You Never Forget =

- 1967 U.S. RCA Victor 45 picture sleeve, 47-9115, "Elvis sings That's Someone You Never Forget"

Single by Elvis Presley

from the album Pot Luck
- A-side: "Long Legged Girl (with the Short Dress On)"
- Released: April 28, 1967
- Recorded: June 25, 1961
- Genre: Pop; rock and roll
- Length: 2:48
- Label: RCA Victor
- Songwriters: Elvis Presley; Red West
- Producers: Steve Sholes, Joseph Lilley

Elvis Presley singles chronology
"You Gotta Stop" / "The Love Machine" (1967)	"That's Someone You Never Forget" / "Long Legged Girl (with the Short Dress On)" (1967)	"There's Always Me" / "Judy" (1967)

"That's Someone You Never Forget" is a song co-written by Elvis Presley in 1961 and published by Elvis Presley Music, which appeared as the closing track on his 1962 album Pot Luck and was released as a single in 1967.

== Song information ==
The song was written by Elvis Presley with his bodyguard Red West and based upon an idea and title by Presley himself. Red West recalled the songwriting collaboration with Elvis: "'That's Someone You Never Forget' was a title that came from Elvis. He said, 'How about coming up with a song with the title of "That's Someone You Never Forget"?'" Elvis and West agreed that Elvis would receive a co-writing credit because of his contributions to the creation of the song. The song was copyrighted on May 15, 1962, with words and music by Elvis Presley and Red West and published by Elvis Presley Music, Inc. It is surmised that Elvis wrote the song about his mother Gladys Love Presley, who had died in 1958.

Elvis also co-wrote the song "You'll Be Gone" with Red West and Charlie Hodge in 1961. These two songs were Elvis' rare song compositions. At the time, Elvis was trying his hand at songwriting. His input was mostly in providing ideas about creating new songs and choosing how they should sound. In his landmark, best-selling biography of Elvis, Elvis: A Biography (1971), Jerry Hopkins discussed this songwriting period in Elvis' career.

The song was recorded on June 25, 1961, at RCA Studios in Nashville and was released as the B-Side to the 1967 single "Long Legged Girl (with the Short Dress On)" on April 28, issued as RCA 47-9115, reaching number 92 on the Billboard Hot 100. The single was also released in the UK, Canada, Australia, Germany, France, and Italy. The song has appeared on several of Elvis Presley's compilations including the Artist of the Century career retrospective collection in 1999. The song is notable because it was co-written by Elvis Presley.

The single was re-released as a red label 45 as part of the RCA Gold Standard Series as 447-0660 on July 15, 1969.

1967 45 single release on RCA Victor.

Elvis Presley Music, Inc., released sheet music for the song featuring Elvis on the cover in 1962 noting that it was "Recorded on RCA Victor" with "Words and Music by Elvis Presley and Red West".

== Critical reception ==
Review of the RCA CD reissue of the expanded Pot Luck album in 1999:

"The 1999 remastering benefits from superior sound and a 17-song lineup, reaching back to March 1961 for its songs, including ... the haunting, gospel-like "That's Someone You Never Forget," which was co-authored by Presley and is one of his best non-hit songs of this era". --- Bruce Eder & Neal Umphred for Allmusic.

== Single release ==
- (1967) "Long Legged Girl (with the Short Dress On)"/"That's Someone You Never Forget", RCA 47–9115, #92, Billboard Hot 100. RCA Victor also released the song on an EP picture sleeve 45 in 1967, 86574, containing the following songs: "Double Trouble"/"I Love Only One Girl"/"Long-Legged Girl"/"That's Someone You Never Forget."

== Personnel ==
1962 sheet music cover, Elvis Presley Music, Inc.

- Elvis Presley – vocals, guitar
- Scotty Moore – guitar
- Hank Garland – guitar
- Neal Mathews – guitar
- Floyd Cramer – piano, organ
- Gordon Stroker – piano
- Bob Moore – bass
- D.J. Fontana – drums
- Murrey "Buddy" Harman – drums
- Homer "Boots" Randolph – claves
- The Jordanaires – background vocals

== Appearances on albums and compilations ==
- Pot Luck (1962, reached #4 on the Billboard Album Chart)
- Pot Luck (RCA CD Reissue, 1999)
- Artist of the Century (1999)
- Blue Suede Shoes Collection
- Elvis: Close Up
- From Nashville to Memphis: The Essential 60's Masters (Released version and alternate take)
- Hit Collection, Sony BMG, 2008
- Love Songs, BMG, 1997
- Elvis Presley Collection: Love Songs
- Studio B
- Pot Luck with Elvis, 2 CD FTD Special Edition (2007)
- Nashville Outtakes: 1961-1964 (2010) on FTD/BMG, Take 5
- The Complete Elvis Presley Masters, Legacy/RCA, 2010
- Original Album Classics, RCA/Sony Music, 2012
- The Perfect Elvis Presley Collection, Sony Music, 2012
- The Copmplete Pot Luck Sessions, 5-CD Box Set, FTD, 2021, takes 1–8

== Sources ==
- Bogdanov, Vladimir, Chris Woodstra, Stephen Thomas Erlewine. All Music Guide to Rock: The Definitive Guide to Rock, Pop, and Soul. Backbeat Books, 2002: "'That's Someone You Never Forget' which was co-authored by Presley."
- Desborough, Jenny. "Elvis Presley song meaning: How Elvis wrote That's Someone You Never Forget for his mother." Express, April 27, 2021. Assessed on March 10, 2022.
- Jorgensen, Ernst. Elvis Presley, A Life In Music. New York: St. Martin's Press, 1998; ISBN 0-312-18572-3
- Jorgensen, Ernst. Elvis by the Presleys. Liner Notes. BMG Heritage, 2005.
- Presley, Priscilla. Elvis by the Presleys. Liner Notes. BMG Heritage, 2005.
- Hopkins, Jerry. Elvis: A Biography. NY: Simon and Schuster, 1971.
- Victor, Adam. The Elvis Encyclopedia. Overlook Hardcover, 2008
