= I Wish I Had a Nickel =

Single by Hank Williams
- A-side: "There's No Room in My Heart for the Blues"
- Released: 1956
- Recorded: August 1948–May 1949, Shreveport
- Genre: Country, gospel
- Length: 1:46
- Label: MGM
- Songwriter(s): W.S. Barnhart, Tommy Sutton

"I Wish I Had a Nickel" is a song composed by W.S. Barnhart and Tommy Sutton. The song was a hit for country singer Jimmy Wakely but is mostly associated with Hank Williams, who performed it on KWKH in Shreveport, Louisiana as part of the Johnny Fair Syrup radio show along with Wakely's other hit, "Someday You'll Call My Name." MGM obtained the right to these recordings and released "I Wish I Had a Nickel" as the B-side to "There's No Room in My Heart for the Blues" in 1956 as a posthumous single. Country music historian Colin Escott states that the Johnny Fair transcriptions "rank alongside Hank's most affecting work" and singles out the Wakely covers for particular praise: "The songs were trite and affectless in Wakely's hands, but Hank filled them with vengeance and unrequited longing."
