= Wild in the Country (song) =

Single by Elvis Presley
- A-side: "I Feel So Bad"
- Released: 1961
- Genre: Folk
- Length: 1:52
- Label: RCA Victor
- Songwriters: Hugo Peretti; Luigi Creatore; George Weiss

Elvis Presley singles chronology
"Surrender" / "Lonely Man" (1961)	"Wild in the Country" / "I Feel So Bad'" (1961)	"(Marie's the Name) His Latest Flame" / "Little Sister" (1961)

"Wild in the Country" is a song first recorded by Elvis Presley as part of the soundtrack for his 1961 motion picture Wild in the Country.

== Background ==
It was written by Hugo Peretti, Luigi Creatore, and George Weiss, who also wrote "Can't Help Falling in Love". In 1961 the song was released on a single with "I Feel So Bad" on the opposite side. In the United States "Wild in the Country" peaked at number 26 on the Billboard Hot 100, while "I Feel So Bad" peaked at number 5. Also, "Wild in the Country" charted #4 in the UK and entered the top 10 in Flamish Belgium (Flanders) and Hong Kong.

== Reception ==
As of August 2017, the single "Wild in the Country" / "I Feel So Bad" is Presley's 38th most selling single in the UK.

== Charts ==
Chart (1961)	Peak position
US Billboard Hot 100	26
