= My Wish Came True =

Single by Elvis Presley
- A-side: "A Big Hunk o' Love"
- Released: 1959
- Genre: Pop
- Length: 2:32
- Label: RCA Victor
- Songwriter: Ivory Joe Hunter

Elvis Presley singles chronology
"I Need Your Love Tonight"" / "A Fool Such as I" (1959)	"A Big Hunk o' Love" / "My Wish Came True" (1959)	"Stuck on You" / "Fame and Fortune" (1960)

"My Wish Came True" is a song written by Ivory Joe Hunter and originally recorded by Elvis Presley with backing vocals provided by the Jordanaires and soprano Millie Kirkham. It reached number 12 on the Billboard Hot 100 in 1959.

== Track listing ==
7" single (RCA Victor 47-7600, 1959)
No.	Title	Writer(s)	Artist	Length
1.	"A Big Hunk o' Love"	Aaron Schroeder, Sid Wyche	Elvis Presley with The Jordanaires	2:12
2.	"My Wish Came True"	Ivory Joe Hunter	Elvis Presley with The Jordanaires	2:32

== Charts ==
Chart (1959)	Peak position
US Billboard Hot 100	12
US Hot R&B/Hip-Hop Songs (Billboard)	15
