= All I Needed Was the Rain =

Song by Elvis Presley

from the album Elvis Sings Flaming Star
- Recorded: October 2, 1967
- Genre: Country
- Songwriter(s): Sid Wayne and Ben Weisman

All I Needed Was the Rain is a song by Elvis Presley. It was written by Sid Wayne and Ben Weisman. It was recorded on October 2, 1967, at RCA's Nashville Studios. It featured in his 1968 film Stay Away, Joe. In the film version Elvis talks at the end and dogs howl in the background. Gerry McLafferty describes the song as "being bluesy, a welcome addition to the film".

In 2018, an album of demos, recorded by Glen Campbell between 1964 and 1968, of Wayne/Weisman songs for Elvis to consider was released and included this track.
