= Rag Mop =

Song recorded by Ames Brothers in 1950

Single by Johnnie Lee Wills and His Boys
- B-side: "Near Me"
- Released: 1949
- Genre: 12-bar blues, novelty
- Length: 2:47
- Label: Bullet
- Songwriters: Johnnie Lee Wills; Deacon Anderson

"Rag Mop" was a popular American song of the late 1940s–early 1950s.

This 12-bar blues song, written by Tulsa western swing bandleader Johnnie Lee Wills and steel guitarist Deacon Anderson, was published in 1949. Considered a novelty song, the lyrics consisted mostly of spelling out the title of the song; because of the spelling used in the song ("R-A-G-G-M-O-P-P") it is sometimes referred to as "Ragg Mopp". The Wills-Anderson song was adapted from a 1946 release by Henry "Red" Allen, "Get the Mop".

While Johnnie Lee Wills and his band recorded it for Bullet Records in 1950, the most popular version of this song was recorded by The Ames Brothers, and released by Coral Records in 1950 as catalog number 60140. The song was part of a double-sided hit; the flip side was "Sentimental Me". The record first reached the Billboard magazine charts on January 6, 1950, and lasted 14 weeks on the chart, peaking at number one. It sold over one million copies. The song was re-released in 1951 by Coral as catalog No. 60397, with the flip side "Hoop-Dee-Doo". The group re-recorded the song several times. The 1950 recording is considered an example of proto-rock and roll as it contained elements that would later go into the defining of the genre.

== Parodies ==
Lou Monte recorded an Italian-flavored version soon after the Ames Brothers' original, and, in 1963, Allan Sherman recorded "Rat Fink".

== Covers ==
The song was featured as a musical number in Bob Clampett's original 1950s children's television puppet show Time for Beany, and in the later color animated program Beany and Cecil (in the 1962 episode "D.J. the DJ").

The song also appears in the first season episode of The Muppet Show with guest star Lena Horne, where a vocal group of rag mops sing it with Jim Henson as the lead singer, the only one whose handle is not seen.

Sharon, Lois & Bram recorded and performed the song in 1986 on the Season 2 episode "Clean Up" of their television series Sharon, Lois & Bram's Elephant Show.

Preceded by "I Can Dream, Can't I?" by The Andrews Sisters	U.S. Billboard Best Sellers in Stores number-one single February 11, 1950	Succeeded by "Chattanoogie Shoe Shine Boy" by Red Foley
