= Johnnie Lee Wills =

American singer-songwriter

Johnnie Lee Wills (September 2, 1912 – October 25, 1984) was an American Western swing fiddler popular in the 1930s and 1940s.

== Biography ==
Wills was born in Jewett, Texas, United States, and was the younger brother of Bob Wills. He played banjo with Bob as a member of the Texas Playboys starting in 1934, the year the ensemble began playing on KVOO in Tulsa, Oklahoma. In 1939, he founded his own group, the Rhythmairs, but returned to the Playboys in 1940 when Bob split the ensemble into two groups, and named Johnnie Lee leader of one of them. Following Bob's move to California in 1940, Johnnie Lee renamed his group Johnnie Lee Wills & All The Boys, remaining in Oklahoma. Johnnie Lee switched from banjo to fiddle in this group. In 1940, both brothers appeared the film, Take Me Back to Oklahoma, starring Tex Ritter.

In 1941, he signed with Decca Records, and recorded again with Bullet Records in 1949, where he saw his greatest success with songs such as "Rag Mop" and "Peter Cotton Tail". In 1952, he signed with RCA Victor, where he was less successful, though he was still a popular draw in Oklahoma, and he remained a fixture on KVOO until 1958.

He continued to record through the early 1960s, but his ensemble dissolved in 1964, after which he was only intermittently active in music. He opened a clothing store in Tulsa, and recorded for Flying Fish Records and Delta Records in the 1970s; after Bear Family Records and Rounder Records reissued some of his old material.

Wills died from heart failure on October 25, 1984 in Tulsa.

On September 14, 1996, Tulsa honored Wills with a street named after him. Johnnie Lee Wills Lane is directly in front of the Expo Square Pavilion at the Tulsa State Fairgrounds. At the official dedication in 1996, his son John T. Wills said, "...although Dad was born a Texan, when you think about it, he lived and died a Tulsan."

== Discography ==
- At the Tulsa Stampede (Sims 108, 1963)
- The Best of Johnnie Lee Wills (Crown CST-565, 1968)
- Reunion (Flying Fish FF-069, 1978)
- Tulsa Swing (Rounder 1027, 1978)
- The Band's A-Rockin' (1941–1951) (Krazy Kat KK CD-18, 1996)
