= Lonely Man (Elvis Presley song) =

Single by Elvis Presley
- A-side: "Surrender"
- Released: 27 February 1961
- Recorded: November 7–8, 1960
- Studio: Radio Recorders, Hollywood
- Genre: Folk
- Length: 2:42
- Label: RCA Victor
- Songwriters: Bennie Benjamin; Sol Marcus

Elvis Presley singles chronology
"Are You Lonesome Tonight?" (1960)	"Lonely Man" / "Surrender" (1961)	"I Feel So Bad" (1961)

UK singles chronology
"Wooden Heart" (1961)	"Lonely Man" (1961)	"Wild in the Country" (1961)

"Lonely Man" is a song first recorded by Elvis Presley as part of the soundtrack for his 1961 motion picture Wild in the Country, but eventually dropped from the movie.

The movie was originally titled "Lonely Man", and an excerpt of Elvis singing the song could be seen in its original trailer, but the song was cut before release and the movie's title changed. The background vocals are provided by the Jordanaires.

In 1961 "Lonely Man" was released as the flip side to the single "Surrender". In the United States, "Lonely Man" peaked at number 32 on the Billboard Hot 100, while "Surrender" reached number 1. Both were certified Platinum by the RIAA, and also separately entered the top 3 in Hong Kong. Later the song "Lonely Man" was included on Presley's 1968 greatest hits album Elvis' Gold Records Volume 4.

== Writing and release history ==
The song was written by Bennie Benjamin and Sol Marcus and published by Gladys Music, Inc. It was recorded by Elvis Presley during the soundtrack sessions for 20th Century Fox's motion picture Wild in the Country, held November 7–8, 1960, at the Radio Recorders Studio in Hollywood.

== Charts ==
Chart (1961)	Peak position
US Billboard Hot 100	32
US Cash Box Top 100	82
