= Long Legged Girl (with the Short Dress On) =

Single by Elvis Presley with the Jordanaires

from the album Double Trouble
- B-side: "That's Someone You Never Forget"
- Released: April 28, 1967
- Genre: Rock and roll
- Length: 1:29
- Label: RCA Victor
- Songwriters: J. Leslie McFarland; Winfield Scott

Elvis Presley with the Jordanaires singles chronology
"You Gotta Stop" / "The Love Machine" (1967)	"Long Legged Girl (with the Short Dress On)" / "That's Someone You Never Forget" (1967)	"There's Always Me" / "Judy" (1967)

Professional ratings
Review scores
Source	Rating
Billboard	Favorable

"Long Legged Girl (with the Short Dress On)" is a song first recorded by Elvis Presley as part of the soundtrack for his 1967 MGM motion picture Double Trouble.

== Background ==
The song was written by J. Leslie McFarland and Winfield Scott and published by Elvis Presley Music, Inc.

Released in 1967 as a single, with "That's Someone You Never Forget" (from the 1962 album Pot Luck) as the B-side, it spent 6 weeks on the Billboard Hot 100, peaking at No. 63 on the week ending June 10. The single reached No. 24 in Canada, No. 36 in Australia on the Go-Set chart, and No. 49 in the UK.

== Critical response ==
Billboard reviewed the single in its May 6, 1967 issue. The magazine predicted "Long Legged Girl (with the Short Dress On)" to reach the top 60 of the Hot 100 chart and characterized it as "a strong rhythm entry with traces of his earlier hit sounds" such as "Blue Suede Shoes".

The 2014 book The Elvis Movies called "Long Legged Girl (with the Short Dress On)" "probably the best song in the movie" Double Trouble.

The 2013 book Elvis Music FAQ concluded: "Long Legged Girl (with the Short Dress On)" is tolerable faux hard rock. "The guitar is dirty, but the lick is humdrum, and Elvis sounds detached. It wasn't a good single choice, but it has a pulpy cheese thing going."

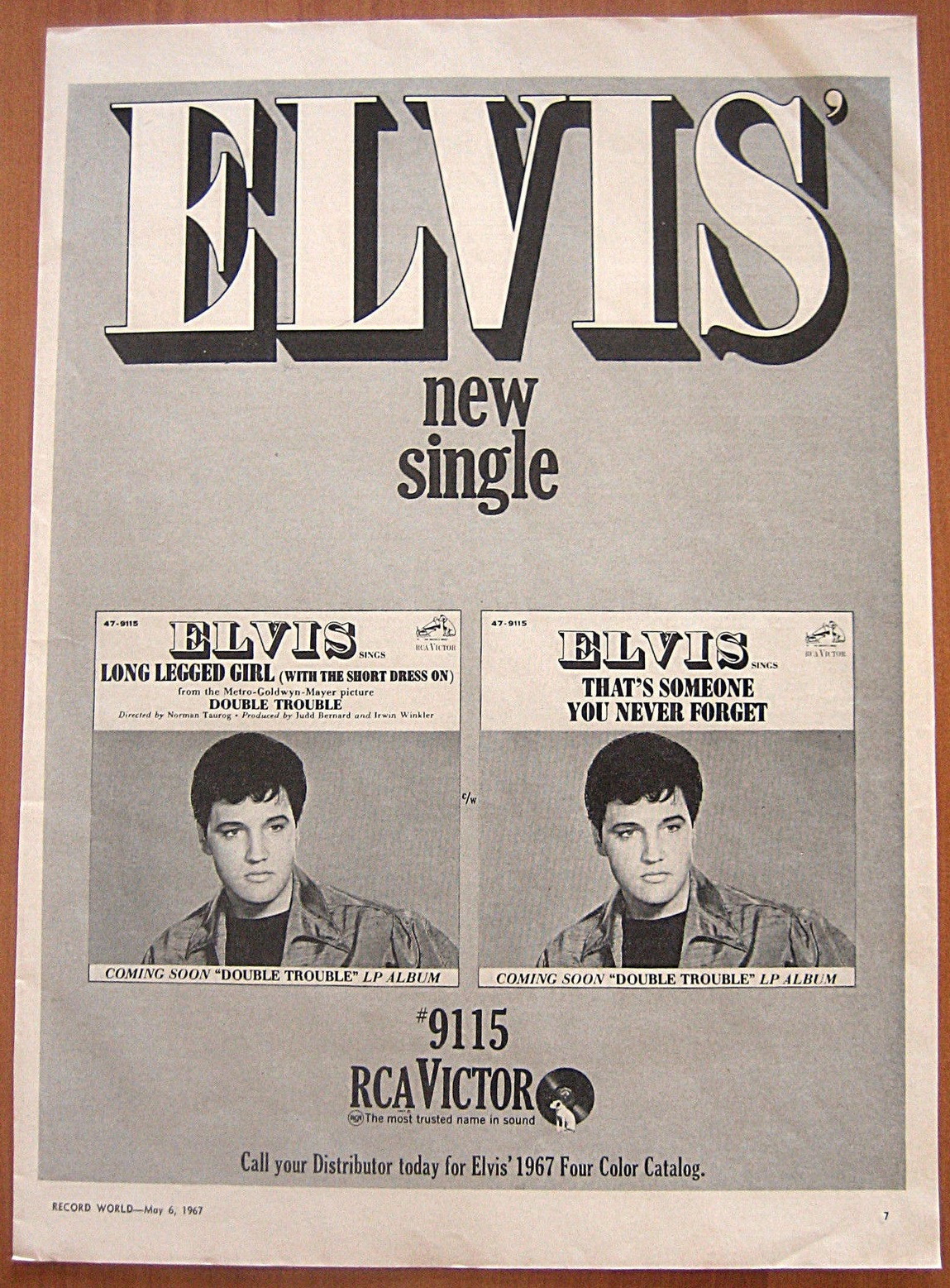
1967 RCA Victor promo ad for the 45 single release of the song.

== Charts ==
Chart (1967)	Peak position
US Billboard Hot 100	63
