= I Will Be Home Again =

Song by Elvis Presley

from the album Elvis Is Back!
- Released: April 8, 1960
- Recorded: April 4, 1960
- Genre: Pop; doo-wop
- Length: 2:33
- Songwriters: Bennie Benjamin, Raymond Leveen and Lou Singer
- Producers: Steve Sholes, Chet Atkins

"I Will Be Home Again" is a song written by Bennie Benjamin, Raymond Leveen, and Lou Singer, in 1944.

The Golden Gate Quartet recorded the song on March 16, 1945. This version was released on Okeh Records #6741.

Elvis Presley also recorded this song. It was released on the album Elvis Is Back!. It was the first song that Elvis' army buddy, Charlie Hodge, sang harmony with Elvis.
