= Millie Kirkham =

American singer (1923 - 2014)

Millie Kirkham (born Mildred Eakes; June 24, 1923 – December 14, 2014) was an American singer who was featured on many classic hit recordings from the mid-1950s through the 1980s.

== Early life ==
Kirkham was born Mildred Eakes in Hermitage, Tennessee. She performed in high school bands in the early 1940s before graduating to session work.

Kirkham was known as the "Nashville soprano" on numerous hit records and became affectionately known as the fifth member of the Jordanaires. She worked with Patsy Cline, Roy Orbison, Brenda Lee, Eddy Arnold, Elvis Presley, George Jones, and others.

Kirkham first became noticed in 1957 on Ferlin Husky's #1 country and #4 cross-over hit recording of "Gone", in which she sang the angelic background harmony. Elvis Presley asked the Jordanaires, "Who is that lady that sang on 'Gone'?", to which the Jordanaires replied, "That's Millie, Millie Kirkham." They called her and she accepted.

It was Presley's 1957 recording of "Blue Christmas" that catapulted Kirkham to icon status. She was six months pregnant, which was unknown to Presley, and immediately upon her arrival he said: "Someone please get that lady a chair". Their relationship, which included a mutual friendship and love of music, continued for a period of fifteen years and was showcased as part of the highly acclaimed 1970 documentary Elvis: That's the Way It Is. When Kirkham left, she was replaced by Kathy Westmoreland.

Kirkham's soprano was heard on many of Presley's recordings such as "My Wish Came True", "Don't", "Surrender", "(You're the) Devil in Disguise", "How Great Thou Art", "Suspicious Minds", "The Wonder of You", "See See Rider", "Polk Salad Annie", "Bridge Over Troubled Water", "Just Pretend", and many others. She also sang with Presley on many of his film soundtracks and performed with him on stage in Elvis: That's the Way It Is in Las Vegas.

Along with Sonny James' vocal group, The Southern Gentlemen, Kirkham was a staple on his recordings. James had an unprecedented string of 16 #1 singles in a row and Kirkham was on a good number of them. She particularly stood out on his hit recordings of "Running Bear", "Take Good Care of Her", "Heaven Says Hello" and "It's Just a Matter of Time".

A longtime fixture in the music community, Kirkham's credits include numerous radio and television appearances, collaborations with the Jordanaires and the Anita Kerr Singers along with her countless recording sessions in Los Angeles, New York City, Las Vegas and Nashville.

In February 2008, Kirkham appeared in "Nashville celebrates Elvis at the Ryman" alongside George Klein (emcee), Pat Boone, David Briggs, Vince Gill, Amy Grant, Wanda Jackson, Wynonna Judd, Ray Walker of the Jordanaires, Ronnie McDowell, T.G. Sheppard, B.J. Thomas, and former members of J.D. Sumner & the Stamps.

== Personal life and death ==
Kirkham married drummer Doug Kirkham. He died in 1986. She died on December 14, 2014, at the age of 91 in Nashville, Tennessee, following a stroke earlier in the week.

== Partial discography ==
Year	Song	Artist
1956	Gone	Ferlin Husky
1957	Blue Christmas	Elvis Presley
1957	My Wish Came True	Elvis Presley
1958	Anna Marie	Jim Reeves
1960	I'm Sorry	Brenda Lee
1960	Poetry in Motion	Johnny Tillotson
1962	Back In Baby's Arms	Patsy Cline
1964	Oh, Pretty Woman	Roy Orbison
1967	Scars (album cut)	Sonny James
1969	Running Bear	Sonny James
1969	Suspicious Minds	Elvis Presley
1980	He Stopped Loving Her Today	George Jones
