= Blue Christmas =

Blue Christmas may refer to:

== Film and television ==
- Blue Christmas (film), a 1978 Japanese science fiction film
- Blue Christmas, a 2017 short film by Charlotte Wells
- "Blue Christmas" (NCIS: New Orleans), a 2015 TV episode

== Music ==
- "Blue Christmas" (song), a 1948 song written by Billy Hayes and Jay W. Johnson; covered by Elvis Presley (1964) and many others
- Blue Christmas (Elvis Presley album), 1992
- Blue Christmas (Ernest Tubb album), 1964
- Blue Christmas (Jimmy Barnes album), 2022
- Blue Christmas (Ricky Van Shelton album), 2000
- "Blue Xmas (To Whom It May Concern)", a song by Miles Davis from Jingle Bell Jazz, 1962

== Other uses ==
- Blue Christmas (holiday), a Christian observance in the Advent season
- Blue Christmas, a 2006 novel by Mary Kay Andrews
