= Elvis Sings Flaming Star =

Album by Elvis Presley

Singer Presents Elvis Sings Flaming Star and Others

Compilation album by Elvis Presley
- Released: October 1, 1968
- Recorded: 1 October 1960, 9–10 July 1963, 29 September 1966, 1 October 1967, 15 January 1968, 27 June 1968
- Genres: Rock, country
- Length: 20:30
- Label: RCA Victor

Elvis Presley chronology
Speedway (1968)	Singer Presents Elvis Sings Flaming Star and Others (1968)	Elvis (1968)

April 1969 Camden release

Professional ratings
Review scores
Source	Rating
Allmusic	3/5 stars

Elvis Sings Flaming Star (Camden cover)

Compilation album by Elvis Presley
- Released: March 28, 1969
- Label: RCA Records (Camden)

Singer Presents Elvis Singing Flaming Star and Others is a compilation album by American singer and musician Elvis Presley, released by RCA Records on October 1, 1968. It spent five months available only at select retail stores featuring products by the Singer Sewing Machine Company as a promotional tie-in with Presley's upcoming Christmas television special on the NBC network, which Singer had sponsored. It was reissued for normal retail channels as Elvis Sings Flaming Star in March 1969, becoming the first Elvis Presley budget album on the RCA Camden label, catalogue CAS 2304. The 1969 release peaked at number 96 on the Billboard 200 album chart. It was certified Gold on July 15, 1999, and Platinum on January 6, 2004, by the Recording Industry Association of America.

Due to the chart success of this album upon reissue in 1969, RCA Records elected to release more Presley titles on the Camden label through 1972. These budget LPs were shorter than the standard running time, featuring some unused soundtrack recordings and previously released items.

== Content ==
All tracks were compiled from sessions for Presley film soundtracks, with the exception of "Tiger Man" from the Singer Christmas Special. The cover of Chuck Berry's "Too Much Monkey Business" was a warm-up at a session for film songs to Stay Away, Joe. Excepting "Flaming Star," the title song from Presley's 1960 movie of the same title which had been released on the Elvis by Request: Flaming Star and 3 Other Great Songs extended play single in February 1961, all tracks were previously unreleased.

The "Texas" medley and "All I Needed Was the Rain" appeared in Viva Las Vegas (1964) and Stay Away, Joe (1968), respectively, while "Wonderful World" appeared over the opening credits to Live a Little, Love a Little (1968). "Flaming Star" had been one of only two songs performed in that film. The live performance of "Tiger Man" was held off the initial broadcast of the NBC television special, but replaced the segment with "Blue Christmas" for the repeat broadcast of the special in the summer of 1969. This track has the distinction of being the first live recording by Elvis ever commercially released. The remaining songs were not actually used in their respective films.

== Reissues ==
Flaming Star was reissued in 1975 by Pickwick Records, and again on compact disc by Sony/RCA in 2006.

== Track listing ==
Side one
No.	Title	Writer(s)	Recording date	Length
1.	"Flaming Star" (from the film Flaming Star)	Sid Wayne and Sherman Edwards	October 7, 1960	2:25
2.	"Wonderful World" (from the film Live A Little, Love A Little)	Guy Fletcher and Doug Flett	March 7, 1968	2:14
3.	"Night Life" (from the film Viva Las Vegas sessions; not used in the film)	Bernie Baum, Bill Giant, Florence Kaye	July 9, 1963	1:53
4.	"All I Needed Was the Rain" (from the film Stay Away, Joe)	Sid Wayne and Ben Weisman	October 1, 1967	1:49
5.	"Too Much Monkey Business"	Chuck Berry	January 15, 1968	2:25

Side two
No.	Title	Writer(s)	Recording date	Length
1.	"Yellow Rose of Texas" / "Eyes of Texas" (from the film Viva Las Vegas)	Traditional / Fred Wise, Randy Starr	July 10, 1963	2:58
2.	"She's a Machine" (from the film Easy Come, Easy Go sessions; not used in the film)	Joy Byers	September 29, 1966	1:39
3.	"Do the Vega" (from the film Viva Las Vegas sessions; not used in the film)	Bernie Baum, Bill Giant, Florence Kaye	July 10, 1963	2:26
4.	"Tiger Man" (from Singer NBC-TV Special)	Joe Hill Louis, Sam Phillips (as Sam Burns)	June 27, 1968	2:41

Note

- RCA originally released the song "Flaming Star" on the extended play single Elvis by Request: Flaming Star and 3 Other Great Songs (RCA LPC 128), which peaked at number 14 on the Billboard Hot 100 chart.

== Charts ==
=== Album ===
Chart (1969)	Peak position
Dutch Albums Chart	1
Norway Albums Top 40 Chart	11
UK Albums Chart	2

=== Certifications and sales ===
Region	Certification	Sales/shipments
United States (RIAA)	Platinum	1,000,000

== See also ==
- Elvis for Everyone 1965 album
- Let's Be Friends 1970 album
