= There's Always Me =

Single by Elvis Presley

from the album Something for Everybody
- B-side: "Judy"
- Released: August 8, 1967
- Recorded: March 12, 1961
- Genre: Pop
- Length: 2:15
- Label: RCA Victor
- Songwriter: Don Robertson
- Producer: Steve Sholes

Elvis Presley singles chronology
"Long Legged Girl (with the Short Dress On)" / "That's Someone You Never Forget" (1967)	"There's Always Me" / "Judy" (1967)	"Big Boss Man" / "You Don't Know Me" (1967)

"There's Always Me" is a 1961 song by Elvis Presley originally on the album Something for Everybody. The song was also released as a single in 1967.

== Background ==
The song was included on an Elvis Presley recording session held March 12, 1961. "There's Always Me" is a ballad featured on the studio album Something for Everybody released on May 19, 1961. The backing vocals were by the Jordanaires.

The song was published by Elvis Presley's publishing company, Gladys Music, Inc. The writer was pianist and songwriter Don Robertson. Presley was enthusiastic whilst recording it, relishing the challenge of the tenor ending. Robertson recalled the conversation: "Just before the recording reached the end, he said to me: 'Listen to this ending'. He was very proud of his semi-operatic delivery of the title line at the end, as well he should have been."

The song was recorded at RCA Studio B in Nashville, Tennessee.

== Release history ==
On August 8, 1967, the recording (Matrix # 0574) was released as an A side picture sleeve 45 single on RCA Victor, 47–9287, backed with "Judy", as part of the "By Popular Demand" series as a "Summer Vacation Special". The picture sleeve had the song "Judy" (Matrix # 0577) on the cover as the A side. The single peaked at no. 56 on the Billboard pop singles chart. The single reached No. 7 on the Australian Go-Set chart in October, 1967 in a 17-week chart run. The single was also released in the UK, Canada, West Germany, France, Spain, Australia, New Zealand, and Japan.

The recording appears on the 1993 RCA compilation album From Nashville to Memphis: The Essential '60s Masters.

It was included on the 2001 BMG/RCA Elvis Presley compilation album The 50 Greatest Love Songs.

An alternate take 2 appeared on the 2002 RCA compilation Today, Tomorrow, and Forever.

The song is featured in the 2004 jukebox musical All Shook Up.

The song was featured on the 2015 Sony Music album If I Can Dream: Elvis Presley with the Royal Philharmonic Orchestra.

== In popular culture ==
The song was featured in a 2018 iPhone television commercial, featuring Elvis impersonators from around the world.

== Other recordings ==
Country music icons Jim Reeves, Eddy Arnold, and Ray Price have covered the song. Dickie Rock and The Miami Showband, who reached No. 1 on the Irish charts in 1963, The Honeycombs, Emile Ford, Rupert, Maarten Jansen, Michael Rainwater, Claudio Araya, Tom Green, Ronnie McDowell, and Peter Williams have also recorded the song.
