= The Frank Sinatra Timex Show: Welcome Home Elvis =

1960 television special

Welcome Home Elvis is a 1960 television special on the ABC Television Network starring Frank Sinatra and featuring Elvis Presley in his first televised appearance following his military service in West Germany. The special, commonly known as Welcome Home Elvis, was officially titled It's Nice to Go Traveling, a reference to the Sinatra song "It's Nice to Go Trav'ling". This was Presley's first TV appearance in three years. This was also Frank Sinatra's fourth and final Timex sponsored outing for the 1959–60 television season.

The special also featured Sammy Davis Jr., Joey Bishop, Peter Lawford, and Nancy Sinatra, who later starred with Elvis in his 1968 film Speedway.

Elvis performed "Stuck on You" and "Fame and Fortune", the A and B sides of his first post-army RCA Victor single release. He also performed a duet with Sinatra. Elvis sang Sinatra's 1957 Cy Coleman chart hit "Witchcraft" with Frank performing the 1956 Elvis classic "Love Me Tender". None of these performances were released on record until the 1980s. Presley also sang a verse during the opening production number, "It's Nice to Go Trav'ling", which has yet to be commercially released. The remainder of the special consisted of performances by the additional guest stars.

Peter Lawford and Sammy Davis Jr. sing a duet together in this show: "Shall We Dance?", after Davis did some impersonations. Davis also sang "There's A Boat Dat's Leaving Soon For New York" earlier that show. The show was a great success grabbing 41.5 percent of the ratings. Excerpts from this show appear in Warner Bros.' 1981 documentary film This Is Elvis.

== Background ==
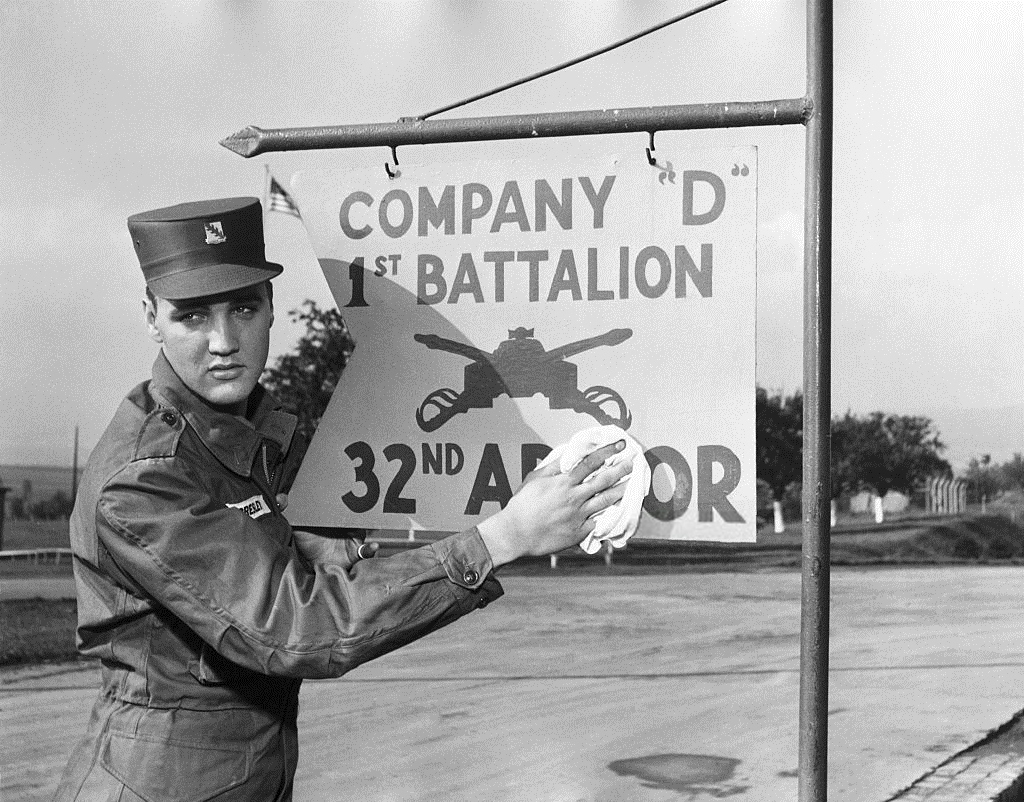
Elvis in the Army, serving with the 32nd Armored Regiment

On July 15, 1959 it was announced that Presley, upon his release from the US Army, would be making his first television appearance on Frank Sinatra's fourth and final Timex-sponsored variety show. For the special, originally titled Frank Sinatra's Welcome Home Party for Elvis Presley, he would receive $125,000, an unheard of sum at the time for a single television appearance. Sinatra was not pleased with Presley's fee, knowing full well this exceeded his compensation for hosting the entire program. He accepted, aware that a Presley appearance would attract huge ratings for the hour, something that his three previous specials had failed to do. Presley's manager, Colonel Tom Parker, also made it very clear that this sum was for only two songs, approximately 6–8 minutes. Parker had hoped that showcasing Presley on Sinatra's show would re-introduce him to an older audience, a more mature target market less likely to dismiss him in favor of the next teen idol. The television special would bring together two of the music world's biggest stars, each with their own legendary titles; Sinatra was known as the Voice and Presley was known as the King. Realizing the publicity from such a media event, Parker was intent on seeing this opportunity run as smooth as possible for his client.

On March 3, 1960 Presley, aged 25, returned to the United States from West Germany. Sinatra had arranged for his daughter, Nancy, to be part of the welcoming party, presenting Presley with a box of dress shirts on behalf of her father. When asked who his current favorite singers were, Presley mentioned Sinatra along with Dean Martin, Patti Page, and Kitty Kallen. Two days later, two years after he'd been drafted into the US Army, Presley was honorably discharged. Two weeks later he was in Nashville, Tennessee, to lay down some new material for an eagerly anticipated single release and an album. Two songs he recorded on March 21, "Stuck On You" and "Fame And Fortune", were chosen as the two sides of his first post-army single, and he would perform both songs live on the Sinatra Timex television special. On March 21, after completing two additional songs for the album, Presley boarded a train from Nashville to Miami, Florida. Arriving in Miami the following day, Presley checked into the Fontainebleau Hotel, the venue where the show would be taped. He spent the remainder of the week rehearsing for the show, which was scheduled to be recorded on March 26, and met with Sinatra to promote the show in a carefully staged meeting that was photographed for press release.

The meeting between the two was eagerly monitored by the media. Sinatra and Presley had been musical rivals since the 1950s, and on occasion they had each been asked their opinions on the other. Sinatra had written an article in a French magazine, Western World, in 1957, describing rock and roll music as "sung, played and written for the most part by cretinous goons and by means of its almost imbecilic reiterations and sly, lewd—in plain fact, dirty—lyrics, and as I said before, it manages to be the martial music of every sideburned delinquent on the face of the earth … this rancid-smelling aphrodisiac I deplore." When asked his reaction to hearing this, Presley responded “He has a right to his opinion, but I can’t see him knocking it for no good reason. I admire him as a performer and an actor but I think he’s badly mistaken about this. If I remember correctly, he was also part of a trend. I don’t see how he can call the youth of today immoral and delinquent." The press, either known or unknown to Sinatra and Presley, was attempting to cause a rift between the pair. They, however, had nothing but good things to say about each other when asked specifically how they felt. Sinatra, when specifically asked about Presley's singing style, responded “Only time will tell. They said I was a freak when I first hit, but I’m still around. Presley has no training at all. When he goes into something serious, a bigger kind of singing, we’ll find out if he is a singer. He has a natural, animalistic talent.” For his part, when asked again about Sinatra's previous comments regarding rock and roll, Presley was just as kind about Sinatra; "I admire the man... He is a great success and a fine actor".

Before the taping of the show, Sinatra was questioned about whether or not he had changed his mind about rock and roll music. He suggested he hadn't by simply responding "The kid's been away two years, and I get the feeling he really believes in what he's doing."

== Taping ==
On March 26, at 6:15pm, taping for the show took place at the Fontainebleau Hotel. It was Presley's first appearance on television in over three years, and his first serious performance since 1957, making Presley nervous about how he would be received. Colonel Parker, perhaps due to nerves of his own, had arranged for as many Presley fans as possible to fill the audience, although at least half of it was still made up of Sinatra fans. For the occasion, to fit in with Sinatra's "rat pack" persona, Presley wore a tuxedo.

Presley's first, very brief appearance on the show was at the beginning. Entering in his army uniform, Presley joined the other guests on the show, including Sinatra's daughter Nancy, to sing a part of "It's Nice To Go Trav'ling". His other two songs, "Stuck On You" and "Fame And Fortune", had been released only days before the taping of the special. Presley also performed with Sinatra, each singing a song the other had made famous, taking turns to sing a verse each; Presley sang "Witchcraft" and Sinatra sang "Love Me Tender". Both songs were sung in the swing style that Sinatra was famous for, although critics were divided on how well it had sounded; "Presley had difficulty with the melody of the Sinatra hit. The harmony between the pair on “Love Me Tender” came off in good style."

After approximately eight minutes on screen and a quick promotional plug for his new film G.I. Blues, Presley was gone. The remainder of the show revolved around Sinatra and his "rat pack" friends.

=== Airing ===
The show, now titled The Frank Sinatra Timex Special and sponsored by the Timex Company, aired nationally on ABC-TV on the evening of May 12, 1960 between 9:30 and 10:30pm EST. Viewing figures for the show were high, with a 41.5% Trendex rating, approximately 67.7% of the overall television audience. To put that into perspective, the second rated show in that timeslot, NBC's Ernie Ford Show, featuring Johnny Cash and You Bet Your Life, starring Groucho Marx, pulled in an audience share of 21.1%.

=== Reception ===
Reviews for the show were generally good, although not everyone was impressed. Life Magazine said "Sinatra does his best singing of the season" and referred to Elvis as "still a reigning favourite after two years in the Army". Billboard magazine stated,

The expected dynamite was, to put it politely, a bit overrated... Presley has much to learn before he can work in the same league with pros like Sinatra, Joey Bishop and especially Sammy Davis Jr., who just about broke up the show with his chanting and impressions... The real winner was probably the Fontainebleau Hotel, where the show was taped last March. The hostelry got a terrific publicity break.

The New York Times was a little harsher on Presley when they reviewed the show.

While he was in service, he lost his sideburns, drove a truck and apparently behaved in an acceptable military manner. But now he is free to perform in public again, as he did on last night’s “Frank Sinatra Show” over Channel 7... Although Elvis became a sergeant in the Army, as a singer he has never left the awkward squad. There was nothing morally reprehensible about his performance; it was merely awful.

Ed Sullivan, the man who only three years earlier had called Presley "a real decent, fine boy" when the young star last appeared on his show, also gave a very harsh critique of the Sinatra special. Writing in the New York Daily News, Sullivan said that Presley "minus his sideburns, has substituted what the ladies probably would call a 'high hair-do'. His hair is so high in front that it looks like a ski jump". Sullivan also criticized Parker's ability to acquire $125,000 for eight minutes work; "Col. Tom, using the logic of a farmer, is a firm believer in not giving a hungry horse a bale of hay". However, Sullivan had failed to take into account the fact that the special did not belong to Presley, it was Sinatra's show, and there were other guests that had to be given airtime.

In her book, Elvis For Dummies, author Susan Doll notes how important this television special was to the career of Presley. She writes "Appearing with Sinatra suggested that Elvis was following the same career path [as Sinatra] and was therefore the natural heir to the Voice". She also points out that Presley's singing style and appearance on the show "clearly signaled that Elvis was courting a mainstream, adult audience".
