= Judy (Elvis Presley song) =

Single by Elvis Presley

from the album Something for Everybody
- A-side: "There's Always Me"
- B-side: "Judy"
- Released: 1967
- Recorded: March 13, 1961
- Genre: Pop
- Length: 2:09
- Songwriter: Teddy Redell

Elvis Presley singles chronology
"Long Legged Girl (with the Short Dress On)" / "That's Someone You Never Forget" (1967)	"There's Always Me" / "Judy" (1967)	"Big Boss Man" / "You Don't Know Me" (1967)

"Judy" is a song written and originally released by Teddy Redell. Elvis Presley released it as a single in 1967.

== Background ==
Elvis Presley recorded his version on Monday, March 13, 1961, in the RCA Studios in Nashville. His recording originally appeared as track 4 of side 2 of the album Something for Everybody, released in June 1961.

In 1967 two songs from the album, "Judy" and "There's Always Me", were released as a single. The song "Judy" reached number 78 on the Billboard Hot 100 for the week of September 30, 1967. while "There's Always Me" peaked at 56th during the previous two weeks.

== Charts ==
Chart (1967)	Peak position
US Billboard Hot 100	78
