= Sentimental Me =

Single by The Ames Brothers
- A-side: "Rag Mop"
- Published: 1949
- Released: January 14, 1950
- Recorded: December 5, 1949
- Genre: Traditional pop
- Length: 3:13
- Label: Coral
- Composer: Jim Morehead
- Lyricist: Jimmy Cassin

"Sentimental Me" is a popular song which was written by James T. Morehead and James Cassin and published in 1949.

The most popular version was recorded by The Ames Brothers. Other hit versions in 1950 were recorded by the Russ Morgan Orchestra and by Ray Anthony.

The Ames Brothers version was recorded on December 5, 1949. The recording was released by Coral Records as catalog number 60140. The record first reached the Billboard magazine charts on January 20, 1950, and lasted for 27 weeks on the chart, peaking at No. 3. The song was part of a double-sided hit; the flip side was the even bigger hit, "Rag Mop".

The Russ Morgan version (vocal by The Morganaires) was recorded on January 23, 1950. The recording was released by Decca Records as catalog number 24904. The record first reached the Billboard magazine charts on April 21, 1950, and lasted for 15 weeks on the chart, peaking at No. 10.

Bandleader Ray Anthony's version (vocal by Ronnie Deauville) was also very popular in 1950, peaking at No. 7 on the Billboard charts.

The song made No. 6 on the UK's sheet music charts.

== Other versions ==
Steve Conway and The Stargazers recorded the song on July 12, 1950, for UK Columbia Records (issued as catalog number DB 2724). Another contemporary British recording was by Joe Loss and His Orchestra.

Pat & Shirley Boone included the song on their album Side by Side (1959).

Steve Lawrence & Eydie Gorme released a single containing the song in 1959.

Elvis Presley recorded the song for his 1961 album Something for Everybody.

Bobby Vinton also released a version of the song.
