= Starting Today (Elvis Presley song) =

Song by Elvis Presley

from the album Something for Everybody
- Released: June 17, 1961 (on the album Something for Everybody)
- Recorded: March 12–13, 1961
- Length: 2:03
- Label: RCA
- Songwriter: Don Robertson

Music video
- Elvis Presley "Starting Today" (With the Royal Philharmonic Orchestra) (official audio) on YouTube

"Starting Today" is a 1961 song by Elvis Presley.

== Writing ==
The song was written by Don Robertson.

== Recording ==
Elvis Presley recorded "Starting Today" during his March 12/13, 1961 recording session at the RCA Studios in Nashville, Tennessee.

It was recorded on a 3-track. According to Don Reedman, who with Nick Patrick produced the 2016 album The Wonder of You: Elvis Presley with the Royal Philharmonic Orchestra, "[Presley's] original recording is very simple, very sparse".

== Release ==
The song "Starting Today" was first released on Presley's album Something for Everybody, put out on June 17, 1961.
