= Reconsider Baby =

Blues standard written by Lowell Fulson

Single by Lowell Fulson
- B-side: "I Believe I'll Give It Up"
- Released: 1954
- Recorded: Dallas, Texas, 1954
- Genre: Blues
- Length: 3:08
- Label: Checker (no. 804)
- Songwriter(s): Lowell Fulson
- Producer(s): Leonard Chess, Phil Chess

Lowell Fulson singles chronology
"I'm a Night Owl" (1951)	"Reconsider Baby" (1954)	"Loving You" (1955)

"Reconsider Baby" is a blues song written and recorded by Lowell Fulson in 1954. Performed in the West Coast blues style, it was Fulson's first record chart hit for Checker Records, a subsidiary of Chess Records. With memorable lyrics and a driving rhythm, "Reconsider Baby" became a blues standard and has been recognized by the Blues Foundation and Rock and Roll Hall of Fame.

== Original song ==
Blues historian Jim O'Neal describes "Reconsider Baby" as "Lowell Fulson's wistful goodbye and plea to a departing lover, with a lyrical message so strong (and memorable music to match) that it became a standard in the modern-day blues repertoire."

So long, oh, I hate to see you go (2×)
And the way that I will miss you
I guess you will never know

Music critics have noted the song's strong rhythmic element – Bill Dahl describes it as a "relentless mid-tempo blues" and Don Snowden comments on its "utterly assured, swingtime groove".

"Reconsider Baby" has a twelve-bar structure with prominent guitar soloing by Fulson. It was recorded September 27, 1954, in Dallas, Texas, under the supervision of Leonard Chess associate and Jewel Records owner Stan Lewis. Backing Fulson on vocal and guitar are Paul Drake on piano, Bobby Nicholson on bass, and Chick Booth on drums, plus a horn section with Phillip Gilbeaux on trumpet, Phatz Morris on trombone, Julian Beasley on alto and baritone saxophones, and Choker Campbell on tenor sax. The song became a hit, spending 15 weeks during 1954 and 1955 on Billboard's Rhythm & Blues Records chart where it reached number three. The song has been included on several Fulson compilation albums, including 1970's Hung Down Head (Chess 9325).

== Recognition and influence ==
"Reconsider Baby" is a blues standard and Fulson's most recognized song. In 1993, the Blues Foundation inducted it into its Blues Hall of Fame in the "Classics of Blues Recordings" category. The Rock and Roll Hall of Fame included it on its list of the "500 Songs that Shaped Rock and Roll". Among the many artists to record the song are Chicken Shack, Elvis Presley, T-Bone Walker, Bobby Bland, Ike & Tina Turner, Freddie King, Joe Bonamassa, Eric Clapton, and Gregg Allman.
