= Thrill of Your Love =

Song by Elvis Presley

from the album Elvis Is Back!
- Recorded: April 4, 1960
- Label: RCA Victor
- Songwriter: Stan Kesler
- Producers: Steve Sholes, Chet Atkins, Elvis Presley

"Thrill of Your Love" is a song written by Stan Kesler and recorded by Elvis Presley in 1960 for his first post-army album, Elvis Is Back!. It was first recorded by Carl McVoy in 1958 under the title "A Woman's Love." His version remained unissued at the time, but has since appeared on compilation albums.
