= The Girl of My Best Friend =

Song by Elvis Presley

from the album Elvis Is Back!
- Released: April 8, 1960
- Recorded: April 3, 1960
- Genre: Pop; doo-wop; rock and roll
- Length: 2:27
- Label: RCA Victor
- Songwriters: Beverly Ross, Sam Bobrick

"The Girl of My Best Friend" is a song written by Sam Bobrick and Beverly Ross and first released in 1959 by Charlie Blackwell as the B-side to his single "Choppin' Mountains". It was later recorded by Marty Vine in 1960. It was made famous as a cover by Elvis Presley with the Jordanaires in 1960, the song peaked at No.9 in the U.K. singles chart (in 1976). It has also been covered by Ral Donner in 1960 (No.19 U.S.; No.14 CAN), Johnny Burnette in 1962 and by Bryan Ferry for his 1993 covers album Taxi.

== Content ==
The singer is secretly and hopelessly in love with his best friend's girl. He describes the girl's features, attributes, and the love she and his friend share. The singer wants the girl to know about his feelings for her, but can't bring himself to tell her for fear that she would become offended and he would be shunned by both her and his friend. He hopes his "aching heart" mends someday and he finds a love of his own, with similar features and personality as his best friend's girl.

== Chart positions ==
Artist	UK Singles Chart	Billboard Hot 100
Ral Donner	—	19
Elvis Presley	9	—
Bryan Ferry	57	—
