= Flaming Star (song) =

Song by Elvis Presley

from the EP Elvis by Request: Flaming Star and 3 Other Great Songs
- Released: February 1961 (EP)
- Recorded: October 7, 1960
- Studio: Radio Recorders, Hollywood, California
- Genre: Country
- Length: 2:25
- Songwriters: Sid Wayne; Sherman Edwards

"Flaming Star" is a song first recorded by Elvis Presley as part of the soundtrack for his 1960 motion picture Flaming Star.

It was also released in February 1961 as the first track of an extended play titled Elvis by Request: Flaming Star and 3 Other Great Songs.

The song peaked at number 14 on the Billboard Hot 100.

== Writing and recording ==
The song was written by Sid Wayne and Sherman Edwards. Elvis Presley recorded it on October 7, 1960, in the Radio Recorders Studio in Hollywood, California. An alternate song entitled "Black Star" – with a similar theme to the "Blackstar" song that opens David Bowie's 2016 Blackstar album – was also recorded for the movie but was not used.

== Charts and sales ==
Chart (1961)	Peak position
U.S. Billboard Hot 100	14

=== Sales ===
Region	Certification	Certified units/sales
Canada	—	34,000
