= Fame and Fortune (Elvis Presley song) =

1960 single by Elvis Presley

Single by Elvis Presley
- A-side: "Stuck on You"
- Released: 1960
- Recorded: 1960
- Genre: Rock and Roll, Pop
- Label: RCA
- Composer: Ben Weisman
- Lyricist: Fred Wise

Elvis Presley singles chronology
"A Big Hunk o' Love" / "My Wish Came True" (1959)	"Stuck on You" / "Fame and Fortune" (1960)	"It's Now or Never" / "A Mess of Blues" (1960)

"Fame and Fortune" is a 1960 song by Elvis Presley. It was written by Fred Wise (lyrics) and Ben Weisman (music) and published by Presley's company Gladys Music, Inc.

Presley recorded it on March 21, 1960, in the RCA Studio B in Nashville, Tennessee. He also sang it with Frank Sinatra on the TV special The Frank Sinatra Timex Show: Welcome Home Elvis (recorded March 26, 1960, and aired on May 12 of that year).

The song was first released on a single as the flipside to "Stuck on You" (RCA 47 7740). It was Presley's first post-Army single. "Fame and Fortune" peaked at number 17 on the Billboard Hot 100 on the week of May 5, 1960, while "Stuck on You" spent several weeks at number 1. In the United States the single "Stuck on You" (backed with "Fame and Fortune") was certified Gold by RIAA for selling over 1 million copies.

== Musical style and lyrics ==
"Fame and Fortune" is a ballad.

== Charts ==
Chart (1960)	Peak position
US Billboard Hot 100	17
