= Edward Lisbona =

English songwriter (1905–1989)

- Birth name: Edward Maurice Lisbona
- Also known as: Eddie "Piano" Miller, Eddie "Gin" Miller
- Born: 16 July 1905; Manchester, England
- Died: 30 November 1989 (aged 84); Pinellas Park, Florida, United States
- Occupation(s): Songwriter, pianist, bandleader

Edward Maurice Lisbona (16 July 1905 – 30 November 1989) was an English songwriter, who under the name of Eddie "Piano" Miller, was also a popular piano player and bandleader of the 1950s and 1960s.

Lisbona was born in Manchester, England. He died in Pinellas Park, Florida, United States.

== Songwriter ==
- "It's My Mother's Birthday Today", a hit for Arthur Tracy
- "Bob's Your Uncle"
- "Ticky-Ticky-Tee (Shoemaker's Serenade)"
- "Symphony of Spring"
- "Gently", recorded by Elvis Presley in 1961 (Something for Everybody)
- "Prayer", written with Alfred Bryan, recorded by Eddy Arnold
