= Stuck on You (Elvis Presley song) =

- Cover art for Stuck on You single

Single by Elvis Presley
- B-side: "Fame and Fortune"
- Released: March 23, 1960
- Recorded: March 20, 1960
- Studio: RCA Victor, Nashville
- Genre: Rock and roll, blues
- Length: 2:18
- Label: RCA Victor
- Songwriters: Aaron Schroeder; J. Leslie McFarland

Elvis Presley singles chronology
"A Big Hunk o' Love" / "My Wish Came True" (1959)	"Stuck on You" / "Fame and Fortune" (1960)	"It's Now or Never" / "A Mess of Blues" (1960)

Music video
- "Stuck on You" (audio) on YouTube

"Stuck on You" was Elvis Presley's first hit single after his two-year stint in the US Army, reaching number one in 1960 in the US.

He recorded the song during March 1960, and the single was released within weeks and went to number one on the Billboard Hot 100 chart in late-April 1960, becoming his first number-one single of the 1960s and thirteenth overall. "Stuck on You" also peaked at number six on the R&B chart. The song knocked Percy Faith's "Theme from A Summer Place" from the top spot, ending its nine-week run at number one on the chart. The record reached number three in the UK.

The song was written by Aaron Schroeder and J. Leslie McFarland and published by Gladys Music, Elvis Presley's publishing company. The single had a special picture sleeve with the RCA Victor logo and catalog number on the top right corner and included, in large letters, "ELVIS" in red on the top right. On the bottom left appeared the statement: "Elvis' 1st new recording for his 50,000,000 fans all over the world," in reference to his previous hits compilation 50,000,000 Elvis Fans Can't Be Wrong. The U.S. picture sleeve had photos of Elvis on the left top corner and the lower right corner. The New Zealand sleeve did not have the photographs on the corners but had the "45 R.P.M." designation on the top right corner.

== Personnel ==
Sourced from AFM contracts.

The Blue Moon Boys

- Elvis Presley – lead vocals, acoustic rhythm guitar
- Scotty Moore – lead guitar
- D. J. Fontana – drums

Additional personnel and production staff

- Hank Garland – six-string “tic-tac” bass guitar
- Bob Moore – double bass
- Floyd Cramer – piano
- Buddy Harman – drums
- The Jordanaires – backing vocals

== Chart performance ==
=== Weekly charts ===
Chart (1960)	Peak position
Australia	1
Belgium	2
Canada (CHUM Hit Parade)	1
Denmark	1
Germany	1
Ireland (IRMA)	1
Netherlands	1
Norway	1
Sweden	2
UK Singles Chart	3
US Billboard Hot 100	1
US Billboard R&B Singles	6
US Billboard Country Singles	6
US Cash Box Top 100	1

=== Year-end charts ===
Chart (1960)	Rank
U.S. Billboard Hot 100	9
U.S. Cash Box	7

== Certifications ==
Region	Certification	Certified units/sales
United States (RIAA)	Platinum	1,000,000^{^}
^{^} Shipments figures based on certification alone.

== See also ==
- List of Hot 100 number-one singles of 1960 (U.S.)
- List of number-one singles in Australia during the 1960s
