= I Feel So Bad (Chuck Willis song) =

- Original American picture sleeve

Single by Elvis Presley
- B-side: "Wild in the Country"
- Released: May 2, 1961
- Recorded: March 12, 1961
- Genre: Rock and roll
- Length: 2:51
- Label: RCA Victor
- Songwriter: Chuck Willis

Elvis Presley singles chronology
"Surrender" / "Lonely Man" (1961)	"I Feel So Bad" / "Wild in the Country" (1961)	"(Marie's the Name) His Latest Flame" / "Little Sister" (1961)

"I Feel So Bad" is a blues song written and originally recorded by Chuck Willis, and released in 1954 (OKeh 7029). It rose to No. 8 on the Billboard Rhythm & Blues Chart in early 1954, and appears on the album Chuck Willis Wails the Blues. Elvis Presley recorded the song on March 12, 1961, in RCA Studio B, in Nashville, Tennessee, and released it as a single on RCA Victor that year.

== Background ==
Elvis Presley's version reached No. 5 on the US Billboard Hot 100 in 1961 and No. 15 on Billboard's Top 20 R&B Singles chart the same year. The song, which was released on a double A-side single in the UK (c/w "Wild in the Country"), reached No.4 on the UK singles chart, also in 1961. As of August 2017, the single "Wild in the Country" / "I Feel So Bad" is Presley's 38th best selling single in the UK.

== Other recordings ==
Blues singer Little Milton recorded a soul blues version, titled simply "Feel So Bad", in 1967. It rose to No. 7 R&B and No. 91 pop. The band Cactus recorded it on their 1971 Atco release, One Way... or Another. This song has since been covered by Foghat on their second album titled Foghat (Rock and Roll), Delbert McClinton (Plain from the Heart, 1981), Rory Gallagher (BBC Sessions 1972), and Big Dave & The Ultrasonics (Love & Money, 1993).
