= Zeb Turner =

American singer-songwriter

Zeb Turner (June 23, 1915 – January 10, 1978) was an American country music songwriter and guitarist, and pioneer of rockabilly.

He was born William Edward Grishaw in Lynchburg, Virginia, United States, and he renamed himself after a favorite piece of music, "The Zeb Turner Stomp". With his brother James (who took the stage name "Zeke Turner"), also a guitarist, he backed artists such as Hank Williams and Red Foley in the years after World War II. He co-wrote "It's a Sin", a number one hit on the country chart for Eddy Arnold in 1947, with music publisher Fred Rose. Turner also recorded for small record labels such as Bullet and King Records; some of these were "country boogie" tunes which were influential on early rockabilly. His King Records version of Billy Briggs' "Chew Tobacco Rag" was a No. 8 jukebox country and western hit in 1951, while his own "Tennessee Boogie" had reached No. 11 on the same chart in 1949.

Later in the 1950s, Turner was a disc jockey on Baltimore and Washington radio stations.

== Turner compositions ==
- "Zeb's Mountain Boogie" (Zeb Turner) - a 1946 instrumental B-side by Brad Brady and his Tennesseans (actually Owen Bradley), it was on the first release of Bullet Records and became a regional jukebox hit.
- "Texas in My Soul" (Zeb Turner/Ernest Tubb) - recorded by Tex Williams (1946), Hank Penny (1946), and Willie Nelson (1968).
- "You Hit the Nail Right on the Head" (Turner/Tubb) - played by Tubb and his band in the 1947 film, Hollywood Barn Dance, and also issued as a single.
- "It's a Sin" (Zeb Turner/Fred Rose) - charted for Eddy Arnold (No. 1 in 1947) and Marty Robbins (1969)
- "There's No Room in My Heart for the Blues" (Zeb Turner/Fred Rose) - recorded by Hank Williams (1952), The The (1995), Clyde Moody (1948), and Ernest Tubb (1967)
- "Tennessee Boogie" (Zeb Turner) - charted for Turner in 1949

== Other sources ==
- "Zeb Turner" entry in Country Music: A Biographical Dictionary, Richard Carlin, pp. 407-8.
