= Lou Handman =

American composer

Lou Handman (September 10, 1894 – December 9, 1956) was an American composer.

Born in 1894 in New York City, in his early career he toured in vaudeville shows in Australia and New York. Handman worked closely with lyricist Roy Turk, with whom went on to make chart-topping hits such as:

- "Are You Lonesome Tonight?"
- "It's All the Same to Me"
- "My Sweetie Went Away" - a popular song in 1923 with versions by Billy Murray & Ed Smalle, and by Dolly Kay.
- "One Night of Love"
- "Two Ton Tessie"
- "You've Got Those Wanna Go Back Again Blues"
- "I'm Gonna Charleston Back to Charleston"
- "Me and the Moon"

Other hits were:

- "Give Me a Smile and a Kiss"
- "I Can't Get the One I Want"
- "What Good Would it Do?"
- "Is My Baby Blue Tonight?"
- "No Nothing"
- "Was it Rain?"
- "Don't Ever Change"
- "Baby Me"
- "Puddin' Head Jones"
- "Blue (And Broken Hearted)" - a hit for Marion Harris in 1923.

Handman died in Flushing, New York in 1956 and was inducted posthumously into the Songwriters Hall of Fame in 1975.
