= Don Robertson (songwriter) =

American songwriter and pianist (1922–2015)

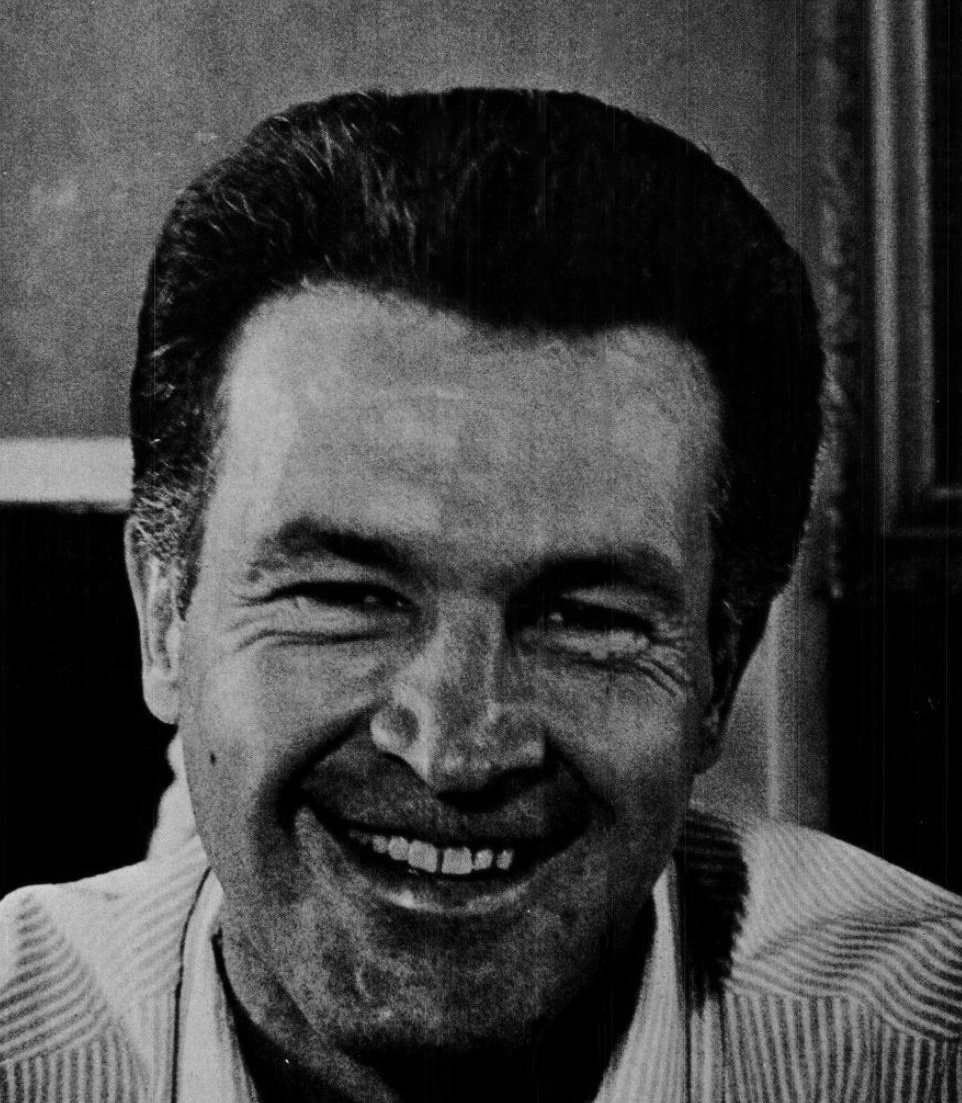
- Robertson in 1966

Background information
- Born: Donald Irwin Robertson; December 5, 1922; Beijing, China
- Died: March 16, 2015 (aged 92) Lake Sherwood, California, United States
- Genres: Country, traditional pop
- Occupations: Songwriter, musician
- Instrument: Piano
- Label: Capitol Records

Donald Irwin Robertson (December 5, 1922 – March 16, 2015) was an American songwriter and pianist, in country and popular music genres. He was inducted into the Nashville Songwriters Hall of Fame in 1972. As a performer, he hit the US Top 10 with "The Happy Whistler" in 1956 (peaking at No. 6). The track reached No. 8 in the UK Singles Chart the same year. It sold more than one million copies, and was awarded a gold disc.

After contracted to Capitol at the time of his biggest selling hit single, Robertson then signed a recording contract with RCA Victor. He composed and co-composed with Hal Blair (né Harold Keller Brown, 1915–2001), as well as many hits for other musicians, including Elvis Presley, who recorded five of which for Presley's films. Robertson resided in Lake Sherwood, California for 55 years, where he died in 2015.

== Best known published songs ==
- "Anything That's Part of You" (performed by Elvis Presley)
- "Does My Ring Hurt Your Finger" (with Doris Clement and John Crutchfield; performed by Charley Pride)
- "Born to Be with You" (performed by The Chordettes)
- "Hummingbird" (performed by Les Paul and Mary Ford and Frankie Laine)
- "I Can't Seem To Say Goodbye" (performed by Jerry Lee Lewis, Jean Shepard, Hawkshaw Hawkins)
- "I Don't Hurt Anymore" (with Walter E. Rollins; performed by Hank Snow, Jerry Lee Lewis)
- "I Let Her Go" (with Hal Blair), (performed by Frankie Laine)
- "I Love You More and More Every Day" (performed by Al Martino)
- "I Met Her Today" (with Hal Blair; performed by Elvis Presley)
- "I'm Counting On You" (performed by Elvis Presley)
- "I Really Don't Want to Know" (with Howard Barnes); performed by Les Paul and Mary Ford, Tommy Edwards, and Elvis Presley)
- "Love Me Tonight" (performed by Elvis Presley)
- "Ninety Miles an Hour (Down a Dead End Street)" (with Hal Blair; performed by Hank Snow)
- "No More" (based on the song "La Paloma", (co-written with Hal Blair; performed by Elvis Presley)
- "Not One Minute More" (with Hal Blair), (performed by Della Reese)
- "Please Help Me, I'm Falling" (with Hal Blair; performed by Hank Locklin)
- "Ringo" (with Hal Blair; performed by Lorne Greene)
- "Stand In" (with Hal Blair), (performed by Don Robertson himself and Jim Reeves)
- "Starting Today" (performed by Elvis Presley)
- "There's Always Me" (performed by Elvis Presley and Jim Reeves)
- "They Remind Me Too Much of You" (performed by Elvis Presley)
- "What Now, What Next, Where To (with Hal Blair; performed by Elvis Presley)
- "You're Free to Go" (with Lou Herscher; performed by Carl Smith)

== Legacy ==
Notably, Robertson also lent his piano-playing skills to Disney theme park attraction Country Bear Jamboree. His instrumental song "Pianjo" is played by the audio-animatronic bear Gomer as the attraction's opening number in the original version of the show.
