= Surrender (Elvis Presley song) =

- Original American picture sleeve

Single by Elvis Presley
- B-side: "Lonely Man"
- Released: February 7, 1961
- Recorded: October 30, 1960
- Genre: Pop; rock and roll
- Length: 1:52
- Label: RCA Victor
- Songwriters: Doc Pomus; Mort Shuman; Ernesto De Curtis

Elvis Presley singles chronology
"Are You Lonesome Tonight?" (1960)	"Surrender" / "Lonely Man" (1961)	"I Feel So Bad" (1961)

UK singles chronology
"Wooden Heart" (1961)	"Surrender" (1961)	"Wild in the Country" (1961)

Music video
- "Surrender" (audio) on YouTube

"Surrender" is a song recorded by Elvis Presley and published by Elvis Presley Music in 1961. It is an adaptation by Doc Pomus and Mort Shuman of the music of a 1902 Neapolitan ballad by Giambattista and Ernesto de Curtis entitled "Torna a Surriento" ("Come Back to Sorrento"). It hit number one in the US, Australia, and the UK in 1961 and eventually became one of his best-selling singles. Presley held the record for most consecutive number one singles on the Billboard Hot 100 before 1966, when the Beatles beat the record, with six consecutive number ones released between 1965 and 1966. That record eventually was broken in 1988 by Whitney Houston, who continues to hold the record today with seven. It would hold the record for most consecutive number ones by a solo artist until Houston broke that record with "So Emotional". This was one of 25 songs which Doc Pomus and Mort Shuman wrote for Presley. It has been recorded by many other artists, including Michael Bublé, the Residents and Il Volo.

== Personnel ==
- Elvis Presley – vocal
- The Jordanaires – backing vocals
- Millie Kirkham – backing vocals
- Scotty Moore – electric guitar
- Hank Garland – acoustic guitar
- Bob Moore – double bass
- D. J. Fontana – drums
- Buddy Harman – percussion
- Floyd Cramer – piano
- Boots Randolph – saxophone

== Charts ==
Chart (1961–2005)	Peak position
Belgium (Ultratop 50 Flanders)	1
Belgium (Ultratop 50 Wallonia)	5
Eurochart Hot 100 Singles	1
France (SNEP)	2
Ireland (IRMA)	1
Italy (Musica e dischi)	1
Netherlands (Single Top 100)	3
Norway (VG-lista)	2
UK Singles (Official Charts)	1
US Billboard Hot 100	1
West Germany (GfK)	6

== Certifications ==
Region	Certification	Certified units/sales
United Kingdom	—	480,000
United States (RIAA)	Platinum	1,000,000^{^}
^{^} Shipments figures based on certification alone.

== See also ==
- List of Hot 100 number-one singles of 1961 (U.S.)
- List of number-one singles from the 1960s (UK)
