= List of UK top-ten albums in 2017 =

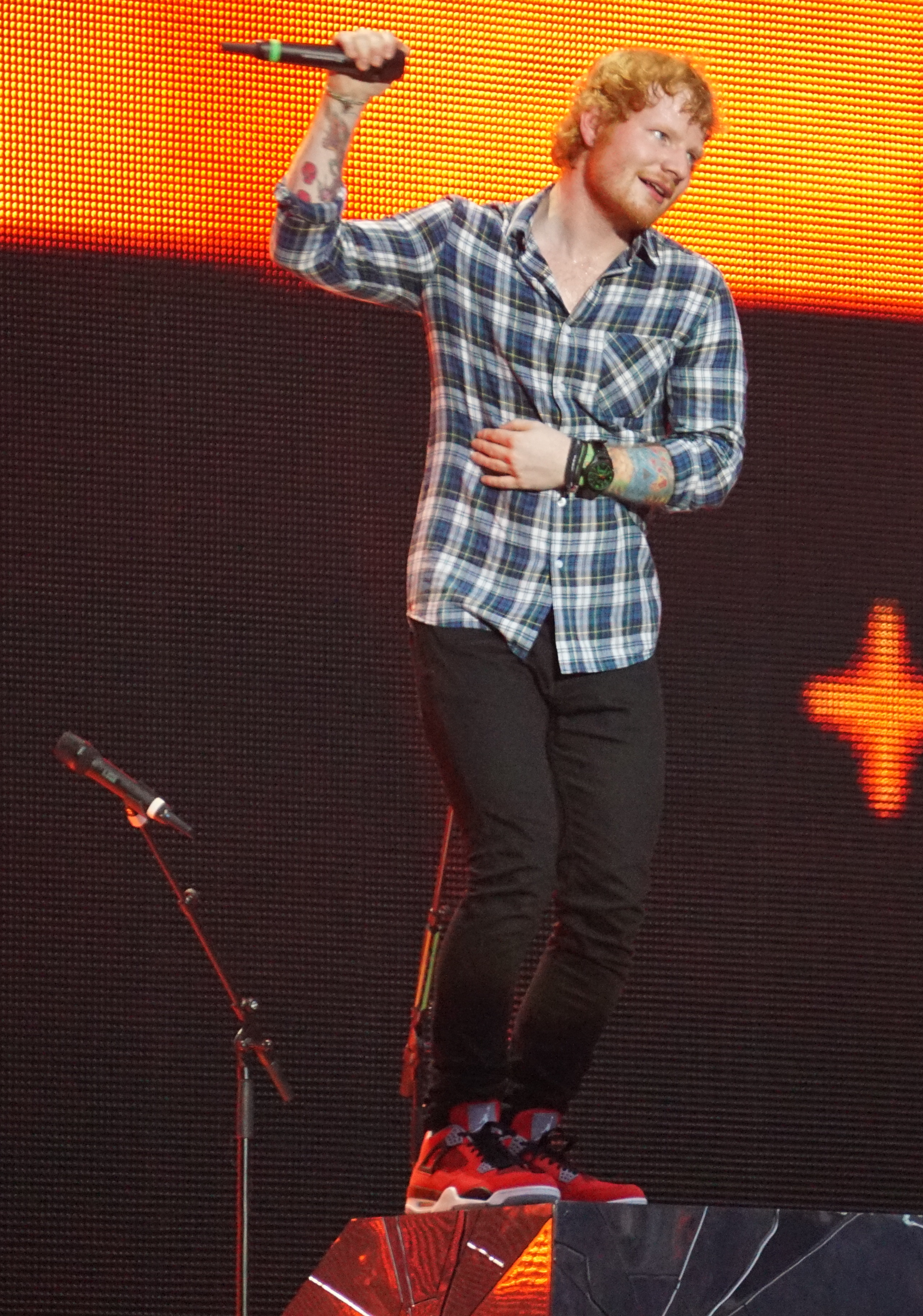
Ed Sheeran's third studio album ÷ was the UK's best-selling album of 2017. Sheeran's first two studio albums + and × also re-entered the top 10 this year.

The UK Albums Chart is one of many music charts compiled by the Official Charts Company that calculates the best-selling albums of the week in the United Kingdom. Since 2004 the chart has been based on the sales of both physical albums and digital downloads. This list shows albums that peaked in the Top 10 of the UK Albums Chart during 2017, as well as albums which peaked in 2016 and 2018 but were in the top 10 in 2017. The entry date is when the album appeared in the top 10 for the first time (week ending, as published by the Official Charts Company, which is six days after the chart is announced).

One-hundred and ninety-five albums were in the top 10 this year. One album from 2015 and twelve albums from 2016 remained in the top 10 for several weeks at the beginning of the year. Dua Lipa by Dua Lipa was released in 2017 but did not reach its peak until 2018. Dua Lipa and Pete Tong were among the many artists who achieved their first UK charting top 10 album in 2017.

Glory Days by Little Mix returned to number-one for the first three weeks of 2017. The first new number-one album of the year was I See You by The xx. Overall, twenty-nine different albums peaked at number-one in 2017, with twenty-nine unique artists hitting that position.

== Background ==
=== Chart debuts ===
The following table (collapsed on desktop site) does not include acts who had previously charted as part of a group and secured their first top 10 solo album, or featured appearances on compilations or other artists recordings.

| Artist | Number of top 10s | First entry | Chart position | Other entries |
|---|---|---|---|---|
| Pete Tong | 1 | Classic House | 1 | — |
| La La Land cast | 1 | La La Land: Original Motion Picture Soundtrack | 1 | — |
| Bonobo | 1 | Migration | 5 | — |
| Wiley | 1 | Godfather | 9 | — |
| Frank Carter & The Rattlesnakes | 1 | Modern Ruin | 7 | — |
| Black Star Riders | 1 | Heavy Fire | 6 | — |
| Sampha | 1 | Process | 7 | — |
| Lower Than Atlantis | 1 | Safe in Sound | 8 | — |
| Rag'n'Bone Man | 1 | Human | 1 | — |
| Nines | 1 | One Foot Out | 4 | — |
| Trolls cast | 1 | Trolls: Original Motion Picture Soundtrack | 4 | — |
| Stormzy | 1 | Gang Signs & Prayer | 1 | — |
| Zara Larsson | 1 | So Good | 7 | — |
| Beauty and the Beast cast | 1 | Beauty and the Beast: Original Motion Picture Soundtrack | 8 | — |
| The Chainsmokers | 1 | Memories...Do Not Open | 3 | — |
| Moana cast | 1 | Moana: Original Motion Picture Soundtrack | 7 | — |
| While She Sleeps | 1 | You Are We | 8 | — |
| J Hus | 1 | Common Sense | 6 | — |
| The Amazons | 1 | The Amazons | 8 | — |
| Dua Lipa | 1 | Dua Lipa | 3 | — |
| Public Service Broadcasting | 1 | Every Valley | 4 | — |
| Oh Wonder | 1 | Ultralife | 8 | — |
| Tyler, the Creator | 1 | Flower Boy | 9 | — |
| Dodie | 1 | You (EP) | 6 | — |
| The Sherlocks | 1 | Live for the Moment | 6 | — |
| The War on Drugs | 1 | A Deeper Understanding | 3 | — |
| PVRIS | 1 | All We Know of Heaven, All We Need of Hell | 4 | — |
| Prophets of Rage | 1 | Prophets of Rage | 6 | — |
| Black Country Communion | 1 | BCCIV | 7 | — |
| JP Cooper | 1 | Raised Under Grey Skies | 9 | — |
| Jason Manford | 1 | A Different Stage | 10 | — |
| St. Vincent | 1 | Masseduction | 6 | — |
| Post Malone | 1 | Stoney | 10 | — |
| Sheridan Smith | 1 | Sheridan | 9 | — |
| Tokio Myers | 1 | Our Generation | 4 | — |

=== Soundtracks ===
Four soundtrack albums for various films entered the top 10 throughout the year. These included Beauty and the Beast, La La Land, Moana and Trolls.

=== Best-selling albums ===
Ed Sheeran had the best-selling album of the year with ÷. Human by Rag'n'Bone Man came in second place. Sam Smith's The Thrill of It All, Glory Days from Little Mix and Beautiful Trauma by Pink made up the top five. Albums by Ed Sheeran (×), Michael Ball & Alfie Boe, Drake, Liam Gallagher and Stormzy were also in the top ten best-selling albums of the year.

== Top-ten albums ==
Key

| Symbol | Meaning |
|---|---|
| ‡ | Album peaked in 2015 or 2016 but still in chart in 2017. |
| ♦ | Album released in 2017 but peaked in 2018. |
| (#) | Year-end top ten album position and rank |
| Entered | The date that the album first appeared in the chart. |
| Peak | Highest position that the song reached in the UK Albums Chart. |

| Entered (week ending) | Weeks in top 10 | Single | Artist | Peak | Peak reached (week ending) | Weeks at peak |
Albums in 2015
| 3 December 2015 | 43 | 25 ‡ | Adele | 1 | 3 December 2015 | 13 |
Albums in 2016
| 23 June 2016 | 9 | 50 ‡ | Rick Astley | 1 | 23 June 2016 | 1 |
| 3 November 2016 | 12 | The Wonder of You ‡ | Elvis Presley with the Royal Philharmonic Orchestra | 1 | 3 November 2016 | 1 |
| 10 November 2016 | 4 | Back from the Edge ‡ | James Arthur | 1 | 10 November 2016 | 1 |
| 17 November 2016 | 8 | The Heavy Entertainment Show ‡ | Robbie Williams | 1 | 17 November 2016 | 1 |
| 17 November 2016 | 10 | Together ‡ | Michael Ball & Alfie Boe | 1 | 22 December 2016 | 2 |
| 17 November 2016 | 9 | Christmas ‡ | Michael Bublé | 6 | 22 December 2016 | 1 |
| 24 November 2016 | 9 | 24 Hrs ‡ | Olly Murs | 1 | 24 November 2016 | 1 |
| 24 November 2016 | 6 | Long Live the Angels ‡ | Emeli Sandé | 2 | 24 November 2016 | 1 |
| 1 December 2016 | 29 | Glory Days ‡ (#4) | Little Mix | 1 | 1 December 2016 | 5 |
| 1 December 2016 | 8 | 24K Magic ‡ | Bruno Mars | 3 | 1 December 2016 | 1 |
| 8 December 2016 | 9 | Starboy ‡ | The Weeknd | 5 | 8 December 2016 | 1 |
| 15 December 2016 | 7 | Blue & Lonesome ‡ | The Rolling Stones | 1 | 15 December 2016 | 1 |
Albums in 2017
| 5 January 2017 | 7 | Ladies & Gentlemen: The Best of George Michael | George Michael | 4 | 19 January 2017 | 2 |
| 12 January 2017 | 6 | Classic House | Pete Tong with Jules Buckley & the Heritage Orchestra | 1 | 2 February 2017 | 1 |
| 19 January 2017 | 1 | Night People | You Me at Six | 3 | 19 January 2017 | 1 |
| 19 January 2017 | 1 | Legacy (The Very Best of David Bowie) | David Bowie | 5 | 19 January 2017 | 1 |
| 19 January 2017 | 20 | × (#6) | Ed Sheeran | 3 | 9 March 2017 | 2 |
| 26 January 2017 | 3 | I See You | The xx | 1 | 26 January 2017 | 1 |
| 26 January 2017 | 7 | La La Land: Original Motion Picture Soundtrack | La La Land cast | 1 | 9 February 2017 | 1 |
| 26 January 2017 | 1 | Migration | Bonobo | 5 | 26 January 2017 | 1 |
| 26 January 2017 | 3 | Piano Portraits | Rick Wakeman | 6 | 2 February 2017 | 1 |
| 26 January 2017 | 1 | Godfather | Wiley | 9 | 26 January 2017 | 1 |
| 2 February 2017 | 1 | Return to Ommadawn | Mike Oldfield | 4 | 2 February 2017 | 1 |
| 2 February 2017 | 1 | Modern Ruin | Frank Carter & The Rattlesnakes | 7 | 2 February 2017 | 1 |
| 9 February 2017 | 1 | All These Countless Nights | Deaf Havana | 5 | 9 February 2017 | 1 |
| 16 February 2017 | 3 | Little Fictions | Elbow | 1 | 16 February 2017 | 1 |
| 16 February 2017 | 1 | Heavy Fire | Black Star Riders | 6 | 16 February 2017 | 1 |
| 16 February 2017 | 2 | Process | Sampha | 7 | 16 February 2017 | 2 |
| 16 February 2017 | 1 | Safe in Sound | Lower Than Atlantis | 8 | 16 February 2017 | 1 |
| 23 February 2017 | 44 | Human (#2) | Rag'n'Bone Man | 1 | 23 February 2017 | 2 |
| 23 February 2017 | 1 | Rip It Up | Thunder | 3 | 23 February 2017 | 1 |
| 23 February 2017 | 1 | One Foot Out | Nines | 4 | 23 February 2017 | 1 |
| 2 March 2017 | 1 | Under Stars | Amy Macdonald | 2 | 2 March 2017 | 1 |
| 2 March 2017 | 1 | Prisoner | Ryan Adams | 3 | 2 March 2017 | 1 |
| 2 March 2017 | 4 | Trolls: Original Motion Picture Soundtrack | Trolls cast | 4 | 9 March 2017 | 1 |
| 9 March 2017 | 7 | Gang Signs & Prayer (#10) | Stormzy | 1 | 9 March 2017 | 1 |
| 16 March 2017 | 88 | ÷ (#1) | Ed Sheeran | 1 | 16 March 2017 | 20 |
| 16 March 2017 | 4 | + | Ed Sheeran | 5 | 16 March 2017 | 1 |
| 16 March 2017 | 1 | Windy City | Alison Krauss | 6 | 16 March 2017 | 1 |
| 16 March 2017 | 1 | Home | Collabro | 7 | 16 March 2017 | 1 |
| 23 March 2017 | 1 | Semper Femina | Laura Marling | 5 | 23 March 2017 | 1 |
| 23 March 2017 | 1 | Hits and Pieces – The Best of Marc Almond & Soft Cell | Marc Almond and Soft Cell | 7 | 23 March 2017 | 1 |
| 30 March 2017 | 11 | More Life (#8) | Drake | 2 | 30 March 2017 | 1 |
| 30 March 2017 | 3 | Vera Lynn 100 | Vera Lynn | 3 | 30 March 2017 | 1 |
| 30 March 2017 | 1 | Spirit | Depeche Mode | 5 | 30 March 2017 | 1 |
| 30 March 2017 | 1 | So Good | Zara Larsson | 7 | 30 March 2017 | 1 |
| 30 March 2017 | 3 | Beauty and the Beast: Original Motion Picture Soundtrack | Beauty and the Beast cast | 8 | 30 March 2017 | 2 |
| 6 April 2017 | 5 | Wonderland | Take That | 2 | 6 April 2017 | 1 |
| 6 April 2017 | 1 | The Afterlove | James Blunt | 6 | 6 April 2017 | 1 |
| 13 April 2017 | 1 | Automaton | Jamiroquai | 4 | 13 April 2017 | 1 |
| 13 April 2017 | 1 | Silver Eye | Goldfrapp | 6 | 13 April 2017 | 1 |
| 13 April 2017 | 1 | Kidz Bop | Kidz Bop Kids | 7 | 13 April 2017 | 1 |
| 20 April 2017 | 2 | Memories...Do Not Open | The Chainsmokers | 3 | 20 April 2017 | 1 |
| 20 April 2017 | 1 | Infinite | Deep Purple | 6 | 20 April 2017 | 1 |
| 20 April 2017 | 6 | Moana: Original Motion Picture Soundtrack | Moana cast | 7 | 20 April 2017 | 3 |
| 20 April 2017 | 1 | Pure Comedy | Father John Misty | 8 | 20 April 2017 | 1 |
| 20 April 2017 | 1 | Let Me Fly | Mike + The Mechanics | 9 | 20 April 2017 | 1 |
| 27 April 2017 | 5 | Damn | Kendrick Lamar | 2 | 27 April 2017 | 1 |
| 27 April 2017 | 1 | Youth | Tinie Tempah | 9 | 4 May 2017 | 1 |
| 4 May 2017 | 3 | Tears on the Dancefloor | Steps | 2 | 4 May 2017 | 1 |
| 4 May 2017 | 2 | Life Love Flesh Blood | Imelda May | 5 | 4 May 2017 | 1 |
| 4 May 2017 | 1 | Jump on Board | Texas | 6 | 4 May 2017 | 1 |
| 4 May 2017 | 1 | You Are We | While She Sleeps | 8 | 4 May 2017 | 1 |
| 11 May 2017 | 2 | Humanz | Gorillaz | 2 | 11 May 2017 | 1 |
| 18 May 2017 | 3 | For Crying Out Loud | Kasabian | 1 | 18 May 2017 | 1 |
| 18 May 2017 | 1 | Pollinator | Blondie | 4 | 18 May 2017 | 1 |
| 18 May 2017 | 1 | Lovely Creatures: The Best of Nick Cave and the Bad Seeds | Nick Cave and the Bad Seeds | 8 | 18 May 2017 | 1 |
| 25 May 2017 | 3 | Harry Styles | Harry Styles | 1 | 25 May 2017 | 1 |
| 25 May 2017 | 1 | After Laughter | Paramore | 4 | 25 May 2017 | 1 |
| 25 May 2017 | 2 | A Kind Revolution | Paul Weller | 5 | 25 May 2017 | 1 |
| 25 May 2017 | 3 | Common Sense | J Hus | 6 | 25 May 2017 | 2 |
| 1 June 2017 | 2 | One More Light | Linkin Park | 4 | 1 June 2017 | 1 |
| 1 June 2017 | 2 | 50 | Engelbert Humperdinck | 5 | 1 June 2017 | 1 |
| 1 June 2017 | 1 | World Be Gone | Erasure | 6 | 1 June 2017 | 1 |
| 8 June 2017 | 4 | Sgt. Pepper's Lonely Hearts Club Band: 50th Anniversary Edition | The Beatles | 1 | 8 June 2017 | 1 |
| 8 June 2017 | 1 | Different Days | The Charlatans | 4 | 8 June 2017 | 1 |
| 8 June 2017 | 1 | The Amazons | The Amazons | 8 | 8 June 2017 | 1 |
| 15 June 2017 | 2 | Is This the Life We Really Want? | Roger Waters | 3 | 15 June 2017 | 1 |
| 15 June 2017 | 28 | Dua Lipa ♦ | Dua Lipa | 3 | 1 March 2018 | 2 |
| 15 June 2017 | 1 | Relaxer | alt-J | 6 | 15 June 2017 | 1 |
| 15 June 2017 | 1 | Last Young Renegade | All Time Low | 7 | 15 June 2017 | 1 |
| 15 June 2017 | 1 | Time Flies... 1994–2009 | Oasis | 8 | 15 June 2017 | 1 |
| 15 June 2017 | 1 | Without a Word | Hank Marvin | 9 | 15 June 2017 | 1 |
| 15 June 2017 | 1 | The Joshua Tree | U2 | 10 | 15 June 2017 | 1 |
| 22 June 2017 | 4 | Truth Is a Beautiful Thing | London Grammar | 1 | 22 June 2017 | 1 |
| 22 June 2017 | 6 | Adiós | Glen Campbell | 2 | 17 August 2017 | 1 |
| 22 June 2017 | 2 | Lindsey Buckingham Christine McVie | Lindsey Buckingham and Christine McVie | 5 | 22 June 2017 | 1 |
| 22 June 2017 | 1 | Witness | Katy Perry | 6 | 22 June 2017 | 1 |
| 22 June 2017 | 1 | Chuck | Chuck Berry | 9 | 22 June 2017 | 1 |
| 29 June 2017 | 4 | How Did We Get So Dark? | Royal Blood | 1 | 29 June 2017 | 1 |
| 29 June 2017 | 1 | Feed the Machine | Nickelback | 3 | 29 June 2017 | 1 |
| 29 June 2017 | 1 | Melodrama | Lorde | 5 | 29 June 2017 | 1 |
| 29 June 2017 | 1 | Crack-Up | Fleet Foxes | 9 | 29 June 2017 | 1 |
| 6 July 2017 | 2 | OK Computer OKNOTOK 1997 2017 | Radiohead | 2 | 6 July 2017 | 1 |
| 6 July 2017 | 2 | Evolve | Imagine Dragons | 3 | 6 July 2017 | 1 |
| 6 July 2017 | 3 | Greatest Hits | Foo Fighters | 6 | 6 July 2017 | 1 |
| 6 July 2017 | 1 | Purple Rain | Prince and The Revolution | 7 | 6 July 2017 | 1 |
| 6 July 2017 | 2 | Timeless: The All-Time Greatest Hits | Bee Gees | 6 | 13 July 2017 | 1 |
| 6 July 2017 | 1 | Grateful | DJ Khaled | 10 | 6 July 2017 | 1 |
| 13 July 2017 | 2 | Funk Wav Bounces Vol. 1 | Calvin Harris | 2 | 13 July 2017 | 1 |
| 13 July 2017 | 1 | Hydrograd | Stone Sour | 5 | 13 July 2017 | 1 |
| 20 July 2017 | 1 | Something to Tell You | Haim | 2 | 20 July 2017 | 1 |
| 20 July 2017 | 2 | 4:44 | Jay-Z | 3 | 20 July 2017 | 1 |
| 20 July 2017 | 1 | Every Valley | Public Service Broadcasting | 4 | 20 July 2017 | 1 |
| 27 July 2017 | 1 | Night & Day: Night Edition | The Vamps | 1 | 27 July 2017 | 1 |
| 27 July 2017 | 1 | King of the North (EP) | Bugzy Malone | 4 | 27 July 2017 | 1 |
| 27 July 2017 | 5 | The Ultimate Collection | John Denver | 5 | 27 July 2017 | 1 |
| 27 July 2017 | 1 | Ultralife | Oh Wonder | 8 | 27 July 2017 | 1 |
| 27 July 2017 | 1 | Saturday Night at the Movies | Joe McElderry | 10 | 27 July 2017 | 1 |
| 3 August 2017 | 3 | Lust for Life | Lana Del Rey | 1 | 3 August 2017 | 1 |
| 3 August 2017 | 2 | Crooked Calypso | Paul Heaton and Jacqui Abbott | 2 | 3 August 2017 | 1 |
| 3 August 2017 | 2 | Hybrid Theory | Linkin Park | 4 | 3 August 2017 | 1 |
| 3 August 2017 | 1 | Meteora | Linkin Park | 7 | 3 August 2017 | 1 |
| 3 August 2017 | 1 | Flower Boy | Tyler, the Creator | 9 | 3 August 2017 | 1 |
| 3 August 2017 | 1 | Raskit | Dizzee Rascal | 10 | 3 August 2017 | 1 |
| 10 August 2017 | 3 | Everything Now | Arcade Fire | 1 | 10 August 2017 | 1 |
| 10 August 2017 | 1 | The Boy Who Cried Wolf | Passenger | 5 | 10 August 2017 | 1 |
| 10 August 2017 | 1 | Paranormal | Alice Cooper | 6 | 10 August 2017 | 1 |
| 24 August 2017 | 4 | The 50 Greatest Hits | Elvis Presley | 2 | 24 August 2017 | 2 |
| 24 August 2017 | 1 | Rainbow | Kesha | 4 | 24 August 2017 | 1 |
| 24 August 2017 | 1 | You (EP) | Dodie | 6 | 24 August 2017 | 1 |
| 24 August 2017 | 1 | 24-7 Rock Star Shit | The Cribs | 8 | 24 August 2017 | 1 |
| 31 August 2017 | 1 | To the Bone | Steven Wilson | 3 | 31 August 2017 | 1 |
| 31 August 2017 | 1 | The Peace and the Panic | Neck Deep | 4 | 31 August 2017 | 1 |
| 31 August 2017 | 1 | A Fever Dream | Everything Everything | 5 | 31 August 2017 | 1 |
| 31 August 2017 | 1 | Live for the Moment | The Sherlocks | 6 | 31 August 2017 | 1 |
| 31 August 2017 | 1 | Tribe | Chase & Status | 7 | 31 August 2017 | 1 |
| 7 September 2017 | 3 | Villains | Queens of the Stone Age | 1 | 7 September 2017 | 1 |
| 7 September 2017 | 1 | A Deeper Understanding | The War on Drugs | 3 | 7 September 2017 | 1 |
| 7 September 2017 | 1 | All We Know of Heaven, All We Need of Hell | PVRIS | 4 | 7 September 2017 | 1 |
| 7 September 2017 | 1 | Love Always | Shane Filan | 5 | 7 September 2017 | 1 |
| 7 September 2017 | 1 | Fifth Harmony | Fifth Harmony | 10 | 7 September 2017 | 1 |
| 14 September 2017 | 4 | Freedom Child | The Script | 1 | 14 September 2017 | 1 |
| 14 September 2017 | 1 | American Dream | LCD Soundsystem | 3 | 14 September 2017 | 1 |
| 14 September 2017 | 1 | The Punishment of Luxury | Orchestral Manoeuvres in the Dark | 4 | 14 September 2017 | 1 |
| 14 September 2017 | 1 | Every Country's Sun | Mogwai | 6 | 14 September 2017 | 1 |
| 14 September 2017 | 1 | Hearts That Strain | Jake Bugg | 7 | 14 September 2017 | 1 |
| 21 September 2017 | 2 | Sleep Well Beast | The National | 1 | 21 September 2017 | 1 |
| 21 September 2017 | 1 | Broken Machine | Nothing But Thieves | 2 | 21 September 2017 | 1 |
| 21 September 2017 | 1 | Hitchhiker | Neil Young | 6 | 21 September 2017 | 1 |
| 21 September 2017 | 1 | Hippopotamus | Sparks | 7 | 21 September 2017 | 1 |
| 21 September 2017 | 1 | Out of All This Blue | The Waterboys | 8 | 21 September 2017 | 1 |
| 28 September 2017 | 5 | Concrete and Gold | Foo Fighters | 1 | 28 September 2017 | 1 |
| 28 September 2017 | 1 | Savage (Songs from a Broken World) | Gary Numan | 2 | 28 September 2017 | 1 |
| 28 September 2017 | 1 | Prophets of Rage | Prophets of Rage | 6 | 28 September 2017 | 1 |
| 5 October 2017 | 4 | Wonderful Wonderful | The Killers | 1 | 5 October 2017 | 1 |
| 5 October 2017 | 1 | Roll with the Punches | Van Morrison | 4 | 5 October 2017 | 1 |
| 5 October 2017 | 1 | The Spark | Enter Shikari | 5 | 5 October 2017 | 1 |
| 5 October 2017 | 1 | BCCIV | Black Country Communion | 7 | 5 October 2017 | 1 |
| 5 October 2017 | 1 | V | The Horrors | 8 | 5 October 2017 | 1 |
| 12 October 2017 | 1 | Now | Shania Twain | 1 | 12 October 2017 | 1 |
| 12 October 2017 | 1 | Visions of a Life | Wolf Alice | 2 | 12 October 2017 | 1 |
| 12 October 2017 | 1 | Live at Pompeii | David Gilmour | 3 | 12 October 2017 | 1 |
| 12 October 2017 | 1 | Tell Me You Love Me | Demi Lovato | 5 | 12 October 2017 | 1 |
| 12 October 2017 | 1 | Younger Now | Miley Cyrus | 8 | 12 October 2017 | 1 |
| 12 October 2017 | 1 | Scream | Michael Jackson | 9 | 12 October 2017 | 1 |
| 12 October 2017 | 1 | The Best of Feeder/Arrow | Feeder | 10 | 12 October 2017 | 1 |
| 19 October 2017 | 5 | As You Were (#9) | Liam Gallagher | 1 | 19 October 2017 | 1 |
| 19 October 2017 | 1 | Wamp 2 Dem | Giggs | 2 | 19 October 2017 | 1 |
| 19 October 2017 | 1 | MTV Unplugged – Summer Solstice | A-ha | 6 | 19 October 2017 | 1 |
| 19 October 2017 | 1 | Heaven Upside Down | Marilyn Manson | 7 | 19 October 2017 | 1 |
| 19 October 2017 | 1 | Pinewood Smile | The Darkness | 8 | 19 October 2017 | 1 |
| 19 October 2017 | 1 | Raised Under Grey Skies | JP Cooper | 9 | 19 October 2017 | 1 |
| 19 October 2017 | 1 | A Different Stage | Jason Manford | 10 | 19 October 2017 | 1 |
| 26 October 2017 | 19 | Beautiful Trauma (#5) | Pink | 1 | 26 October 2017 | 1 |
| 26 October 2017 | 2 | Carry Fire | Robert Plant | 3 | 26 October 2017 | 1 |
| 26 October 2017 | 1 | Colors | Beck | 5 | 26 October 2017 | 1 |
| 26 October 2017 | 1 | Masseduction | St. Vincent | 6 | 26 October 2017 | 1 |
| 26 October 2017 | 1 | Stoney | Post Malone | 10 | 26 October 2017 | 1 |
| 2 November 2017 | 4 | Listen Without Prejudice/MTV Unplugged | George Michael | 1 | 2 November 2017 | 1 |
| 2 November 2017 | 2 | Flicker | Niall Horan | 3 | 2 November 2017 | 1 |
| 2 November 2017 | 1 | 7 Days | Krept and Konan | 6 | 2 November 2017 | 1 |
| 2 November 2017 | 1 | Glasshouse | Jessie Ware | 7 | 2 November 2017 | 1 |
| 2 November 2017 | 1 | 7 Nights | Krept and Konan | 8 | 2 November 2017 | 1 |
| 2 November 2017 | 1 | The Queen Is Dead | The Smiths | 10 | 2 November 2017 | 1 |
| 9 November 2017 | 11 | Together Again (#7) | Michael Ball & Alfie Boe | 1 | 9 November 2017 | 1 |
| 9 November 2017 | 2 | Scream Above the Sounds | Stereophonics | 2 | 9 November 2017 | 1 |
| 9 November 2017 | 3 | Nat King Cole & Me | Gregory Porter | 3 | 9 November 2017 | 1 |
| 9 November 2017 | 1 | Heartbreak on a Full Moon | Chris Brown | 10 | 9 November 2017 | 1 |
| 16 November 2017 | 21 | The Thrill of It All (#3) | Sam Smith | 1 | 16 November 2017 | 2 |
| 16 November 2017 | 8 | A Love So Beautiful | Roy Orbison with the Royal Philharmonic Orchestra | 2 | 16 November 2017 | 1 |
| 16 November 2017 | 1 | Sheridan | Sheridan Smith | 9 | 16 November 2017 | 1 |
| 23 November 2017 | 5 | Reputation | Taylor Swift | 1 | 23 November 2017 | 1 |
| 23 November 2017 | 3 | Diamonds | Elton John | 5 | 23 November 2017 | 1 |
| 23 November 2017 | 1 | Instant Pleasures | Shed Seven | 8 | 23 November 2017 | 1 |
| 30 November 2017 | 8 | The Architect | Paloma Faith | 1 | 30 November 2017 | 1 |
| 30 November 2017 | 1 | Our Generation | Tokio Myers | 4 | 30 November 2017 | 1 |
| 30 November 2017 | 1 | Low in High School | Morrissey | 5 | 30 November 2017 | 1 |
| 30 November 2017 | 1 | Wembley or Bust | Jeff Lynne's ELO | 9 | 30 November 2017 | 1 |
| 7 December 2017 | 3 | Who Built the Moon? | Noel Gallagher's High Flying Birds | 1 | 7 December 2017 | 1 |
| 7 December 2017 | 3 | Christmas with Elvis and the Royal Philharmonic Orchestra | Elvis Presley with the Royal Philharmonic Orchestra | 6 | 7 December 2017 | 1 |
| 7 December 2017 | 1 | Amore | Andre Rieu & the Johann Strauss Orchestra | 7 | 7 December 2017 | 1 |
| 14 December 2017 | 1 | Songs of Experience | U2 | 5 | 14 December 2017 | 1 |
| 28 December 2017 | 10 | Revival | Eminem | 1 | 28 December 2017 | 1 |

== Entries by artist ==
The following table shows artists who achieved two or more top 10 entries in 2017, including albums that reached their peak in 2016. The figures only include main artists, with featured artists and appearances on compilation albums not counted individually for each artist. The total number of weeks an artist spent in the top ten in 2015 is also shown.

| Entries | Artist | Weeks | Albums |
|---|---|---|---|
| 3 | Ed Sheeran | 68 | ÷, ×, + |
| 3 | Elvis Presley | 10 | Christmas with Elvis and the Royal Philharmonic Orchestra, The 50 Greatest Hits, The Wonder of You |
| 3 | Royal Philharmonic Orchestra | 20 | A Love So Beautiful, Christmas with Elvis and the Royal Philharmonic Orchestra, The Wonder of You |

== Notes ==
- Ladies and Gentlemen: The Best of George Michael originally peaked at number-one upon its initial release in 1998. Following George Michael's death on Christmas Day 2016, the album re-entered the top 10 at number 8 on 5 January 2017 (week ending). It re-entered the top 10 again at number 4 on 19 January 2017 (week ending), at number 8 on 9 March 2017 (week ending) and at number 9 on 26 October 2017 (week ending).
- × originally peaked at number-one upon its initial release in 2014.
- + originally peaked at number-one upon its initial release in 2011.
- Time Flies... 1994–2009 originally peaked at number-one upon its initial release in 2010. It re-entered the top 10 at number 8 on 15 June 2017 (week ending) following Liam Gallagher's performance at the One Love Manchester concert at Old Trafford.
- Adiós re-entered the top 10 at number 2 on 17 August 2017 (week ending) following Glen Campbell's death.
- The Ultimate Collection originally peaked at number 7 upon its initial release in 2011.
- The 50 Greatest Hits originally peaked at number 8 upon its initial release in 2000. It reached a brand new peak of number 2 in 2017 when it was re-released to coincide with the 40th anniversary of Elvis Presley's death.
- Figure includes album that peaked in 2016.

== See also ==
- 2017 in British music
- List of number-one albums from the 2010s (UK)
