= List of albums which have spent the most weeks on the UK Albums Chart =

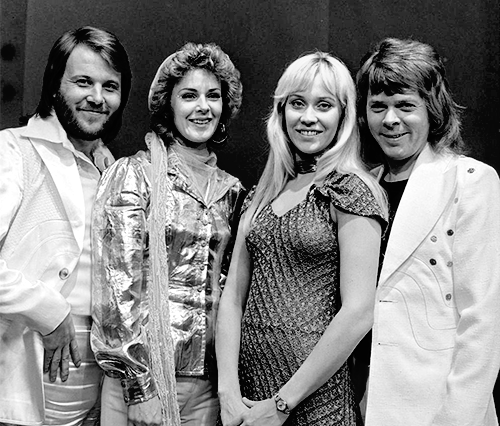
ABBA were the first band to have a singular album chart for more than 1000 weeks with their album ABBA Gold which has been in the top 100 for a record 1266 weeks.

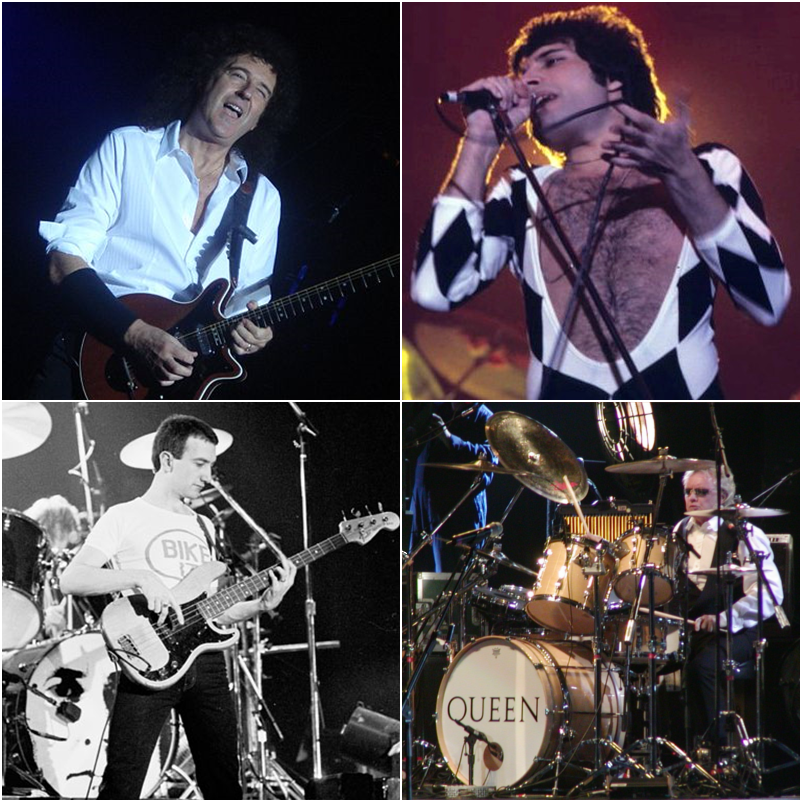
Queen were the first British group to have an album chart for more than 1000 weeks with their album Greatest Hits.

The following is a list of all albums that have spent at least 150 weeks on the UK Albums Chart as published by the Official Charts Company (OCC). The chart comprises a top 100 from August 1981 to 1988 and since 1994, a top 75 before this (and from 1988 to 1994) from 1978 and various lengths before this from July 1956. Re-releases – such as remasters, re-issues, deluxe versions or anniversary editions – are treated together unless the re-released version differs significantly from the original (for example, it has been re-recorded or remixed). This list does not include compilation albums by various artists, which have been excluded from the UK Albums Chart since 1989. Soundtracks are still included if they are an original cast performance or if all tracks are performed by the same artist.

The top three are all compilation albums, headed by ABBA Gold: Greatest Hits with 1279 weeks, followed by Legend by Bob Marley and the Wailers with 1261 weeks and Queen's Greatest Hits which has spent 1232 weeks in the top 100. The most weeks for a studio album is 1175 for Rumours by Fleetwood Mac which charted every year from its release in 1977 until 1989 and in fifteen different years since then.

Eminem's 2005 compilation Curtain Call: The Hits has the most weeks for a 21st century release with 748 weeks. The studio album released this century with the most weeks is AM by Arctic Monkeys, with 682 weeks. The original soundtrack of South Pacific has the most weeks at number 1, with 115. The most weeks by an album not reaching number 1 is 578 for Dark Side of the Moon by Pink Floyd and the most weeks by an album not reaching the top 10 is 476 for Singles by Maroon 5.

Six acts have multiple albums achieving 300 weeks on chart: Fleetwood Mac, Oasis, Ed Sheeran, Simon & Garfunkel, Arctic Monkeys and Adele. Of these, Oasis is the only act to have three albums pass the 300-week threshold, all of which subsequently passed the 600-week threshold, making them the first act with multiple studio albums achieving 600 weeks on the chart. They remain the only act with three albums having reached this milestone, and in 2025 became the first act to have multiple albums achieve 600 weeks. Arctic Monkeys would become the second act to have two studio albums achieve 500 weeks on the chart in June 2024, and the first act to achieve this with two albums that were released in the 21st century.

The numbers shown are up to the chart for the week ending 19 November 2026.

(*) indicates that the album is in the top 100 for the current week ending.

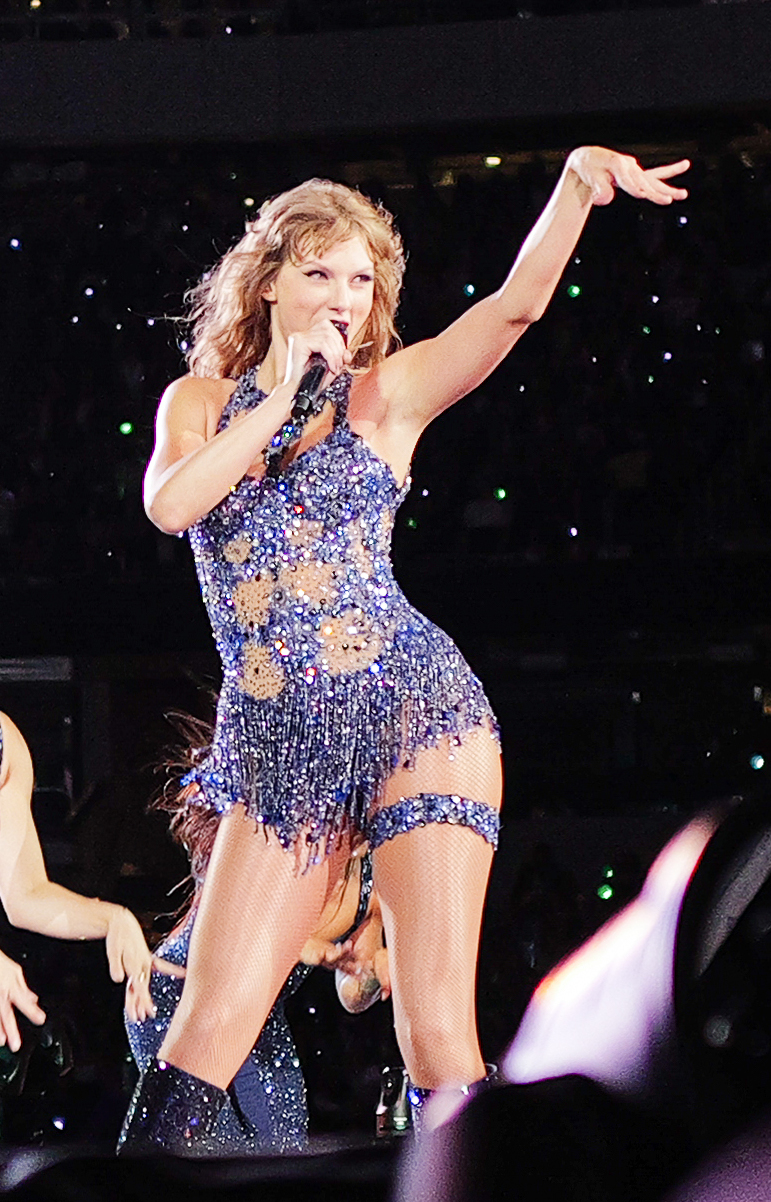
Taylor Swift became the first artist to have six studio albums chart for over 150 weeks, with 1989 (381 weeks), Lover (322 weeks), Folklore (308 weeks), Reputation (256 weeks), Evermore (194 weeks) and Midnights (157 weeks).

== 400 or more weeks ==
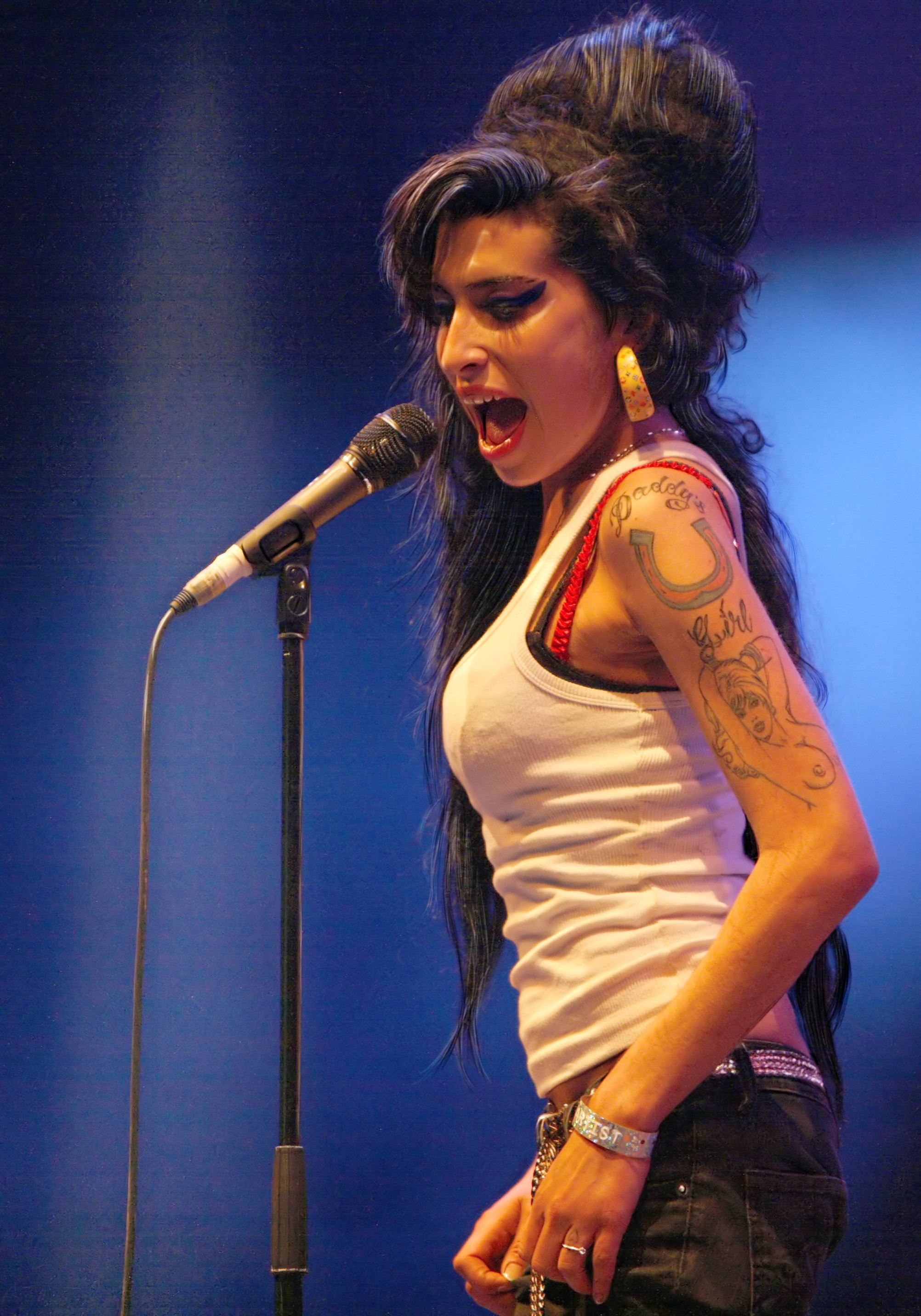
Amy Winehouse has the longest charting album by a female artist with her 2006 album Back to Black (629 weeks).

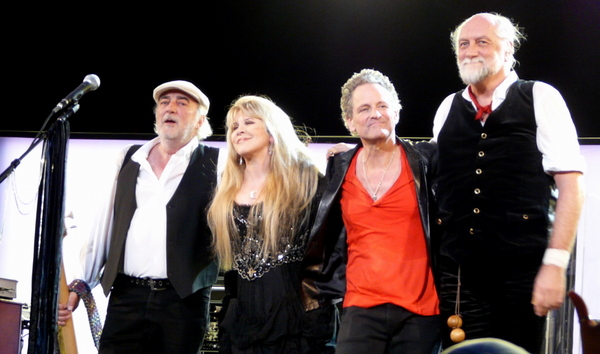
Fleetwood Mac have the longest charting studio album with Rumours (1175 weeks). Additionally, their albums 50 Years – Don't Stop (2018) and The Very Best of Fleetwood Mac (2002) have spent 417 weeks and 363 weeks on the chart, respectively.

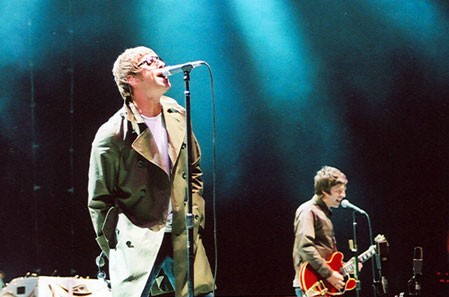
Oasis have three albums which have charted for over 600 weeks on the UK charts: (What's the Story) Morning Glory? (775 weeks),Time Flies... 1994–2009 (688 weeks) and Definitely Maybe (671 weeks), respectively.

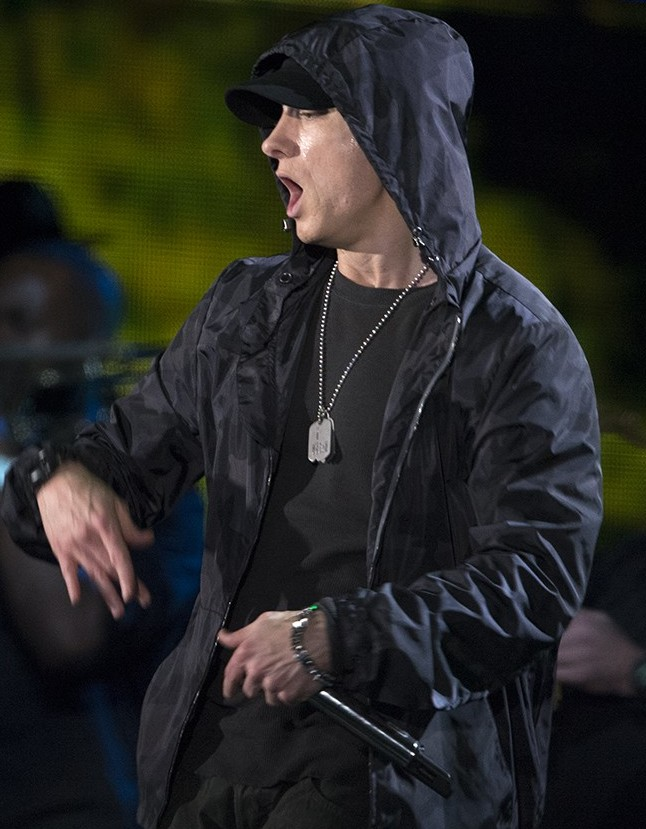
Eminem has three of the longest charting rap albums with Curtain Call (748 weeks), Curtain Call 2 (222 weeks) and The Eminem Show (159 weeks).

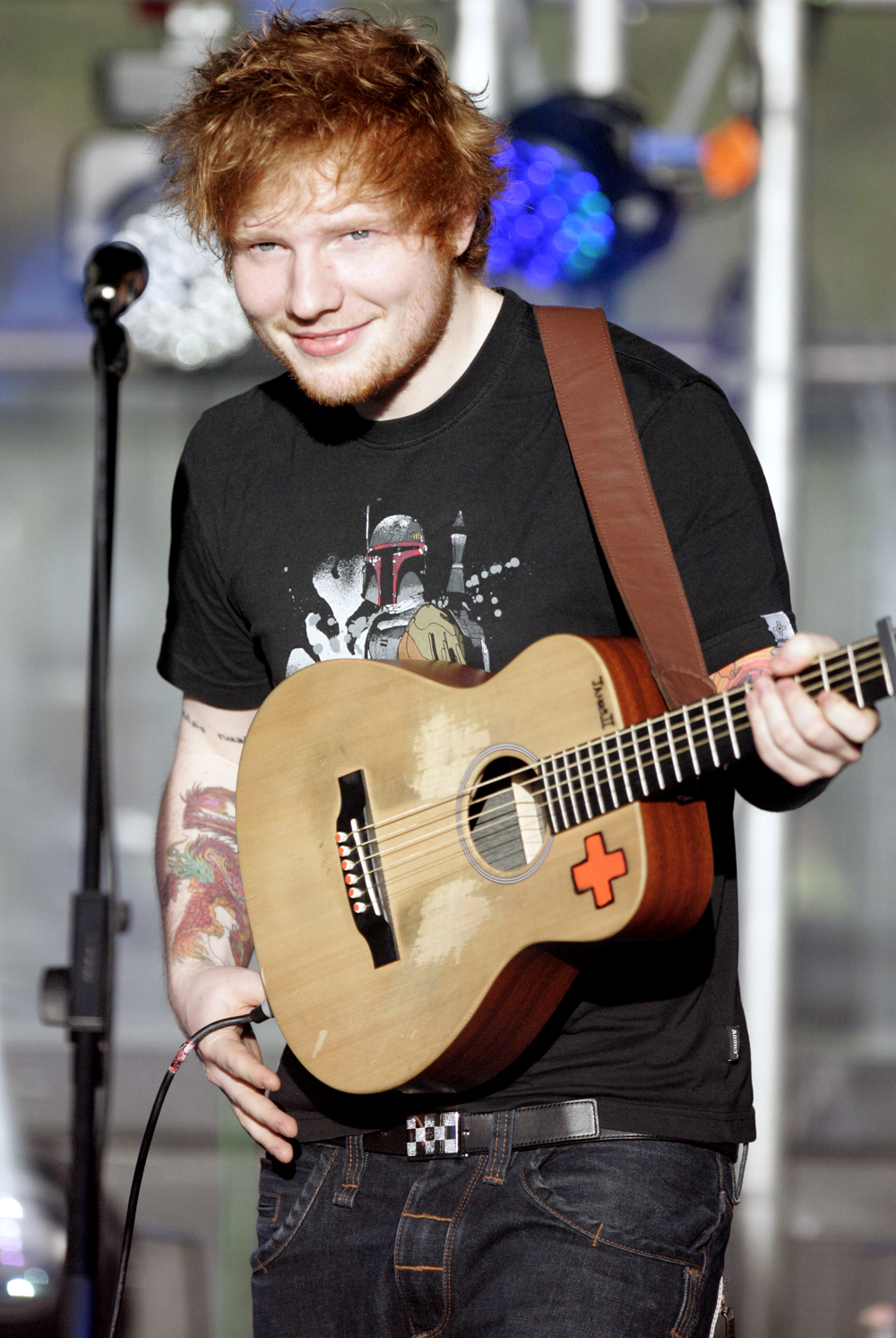
Ed Sheeran has five albums which have spent over 150 weeks on the UK charts. These being ÷ (506 weeks), + (445 weeks), x (442 weeks), No. 6 Collaborations Project (159 weeks) and = (155 weeks), respectively

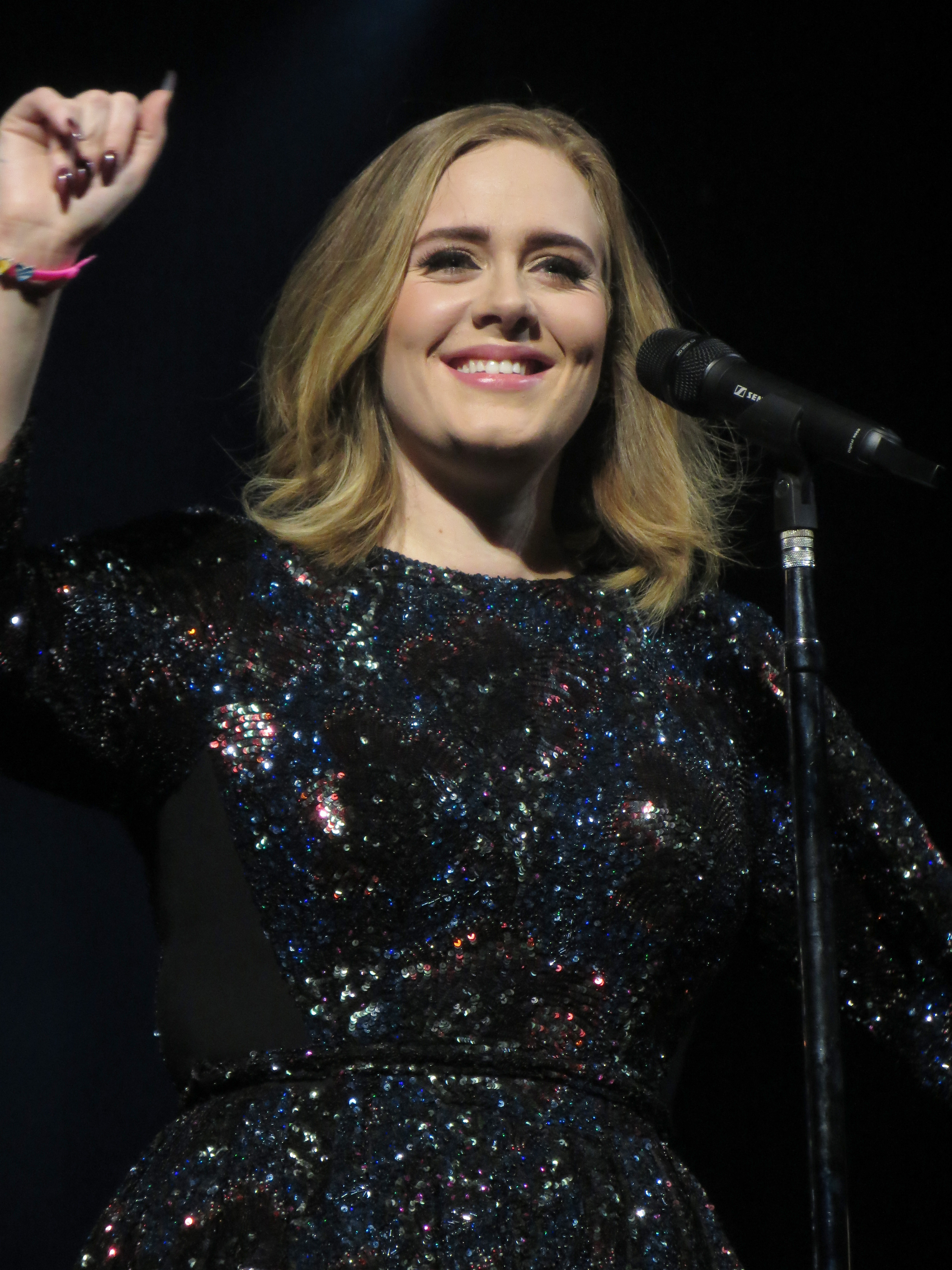
Adele has charted for over 200 weeks with her albums 21 (436 weeks), 25 (365 weeks) and 19 (224 weeks), respectively.

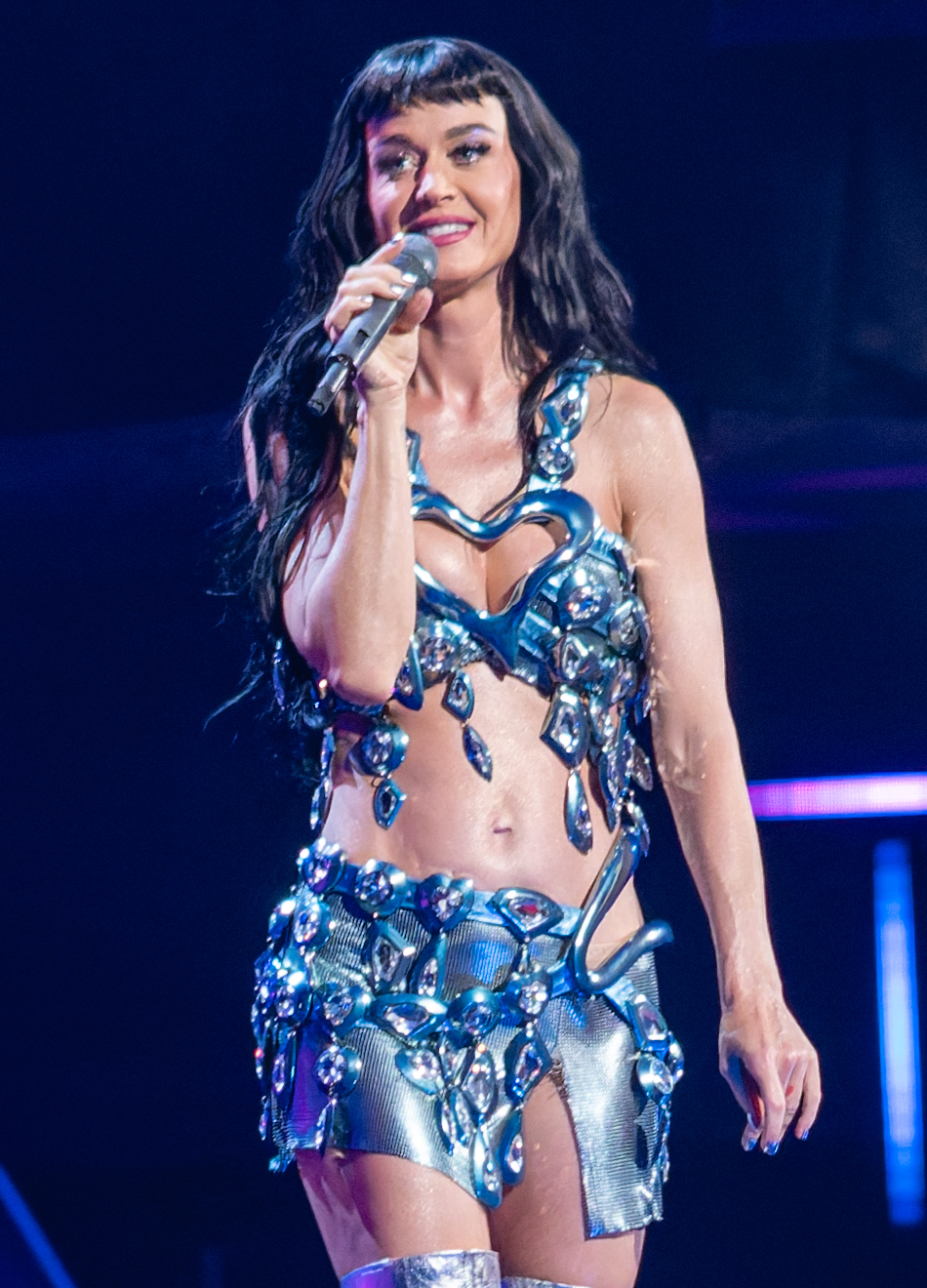
Katy Perry has the longest charting studio album by an international female artist with Teenage Dream (458 weeks).

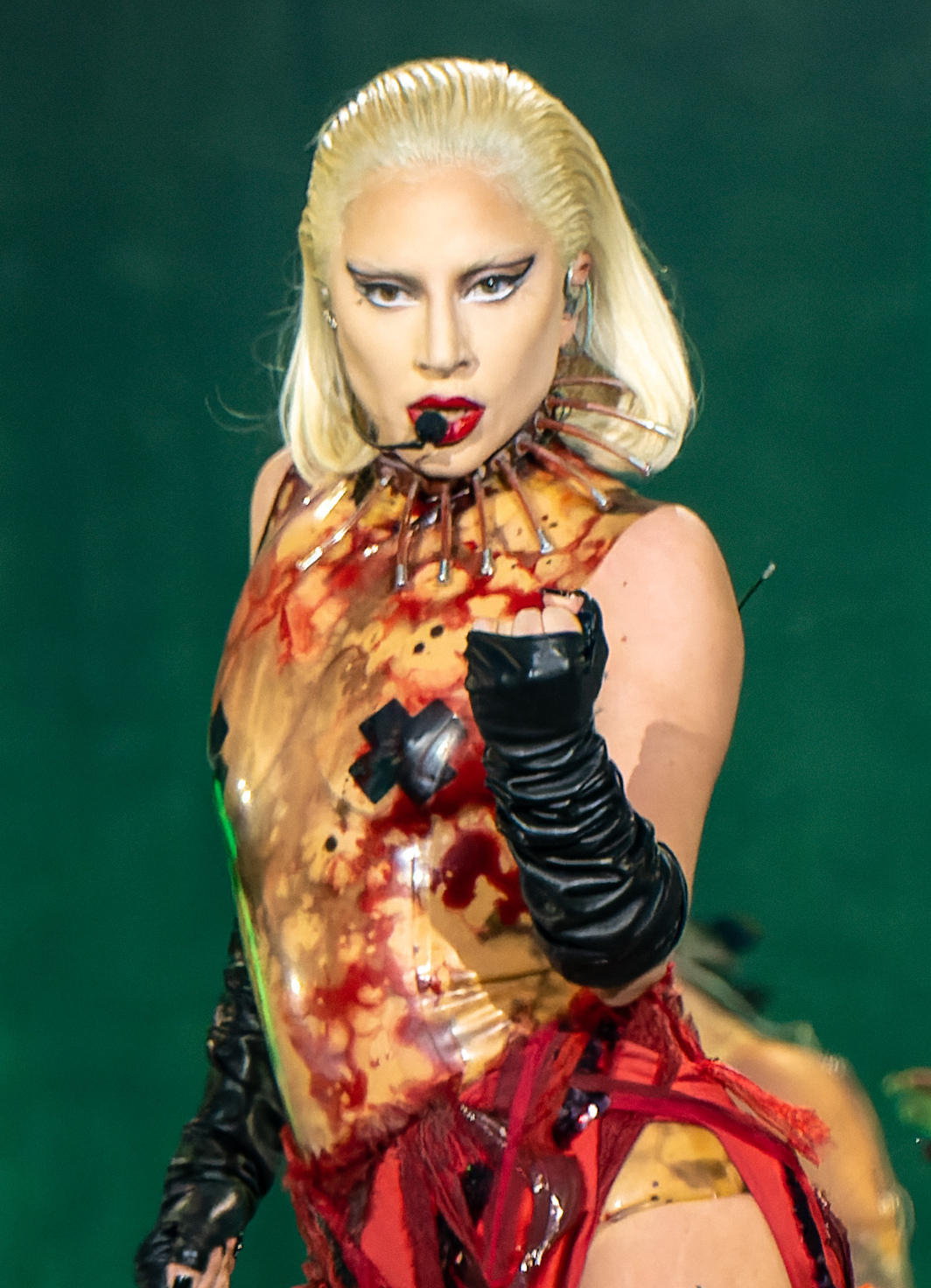
Lady Gaga charted for 423 weeks with her debut album The Fame.

Title	Artist	Year first entered chart	Peak	Weeks	Ref
Greatest Hits	Queen	1981	1	1597*	(Note: Including 317 weeks for The Platinum Collection, which includes all three Greatest Hits albums)
Gold: Greatest Hits	ABBA	1992	1	1284*	(Note: Including 6 weeks for 2014's 40th Anniversary Edition box set which includes Gold, More ABBA Gold and The Golden B-sides. Please also note that the Official Chart Company recognised the original Gold – Greatest Hits as being the first album to spend over 1000 weeks on the Top 100 Albums chart in July 2021)
Legend	Bob Marley and the Wailers	1984	1	1260	
Rumours	Fleetwood Mac	1977	1	1175*	
(What's the Story) Morning Glory?	Oasis	1995	1	775*	
Curtain Call: The Hits	Eminem	2005	1	748*	
Time Flies... 1994–2009	Oasis	2010	1	688*	
AM	Arctic Monkeys	2013	1	687*	
Definitely Maybe	Oasis	1994	1	671*	
Back to Black	Amy Winehouse	2006	1	629*	(Note: Including 55 weeks for the deluxe edition and 1 week for the box set with Frank and Back to Black)
Whatever People Say I Am, That's What I'm Not	Arctic Monkeys	2006	1	608*	
Number Ones	Michael Jackson	2003	1	599*	
The Dark Side of the Moon	Pink Floyd	1973	2	578	
Greatest Hits	Red Hot Chili Peppers	2003	4	537*	
Bat Out of Hell	Meat Loaf	1978	3	530	(Note: The album reached its peak position in January 2022, after the death of Meat Loaf at the age of 74. In the 45 years which followed the original release of the album in 1977, the highest peak position for Bat Out of Hell had been number 9, a position achieved in 1981 and 2013. It originally debuted at number 60 in 1978 and lasted a week on the chart, but would go on to peak at number 11 by the end of the 1970s. As per The Guinness Book of British Hit Albums lists of Top 75 records, the album has spent 456 weeks in the Top 75 as of 3 February 2022.)
Legacy (The Very Best of David Bowie)	David Bowie	2016	5	519*	
In the Lonely Hour	Sam Smith	2014	1	518*	
÷	Ed Sheeran	2017	1	506*	
Twenty Five	George Michael	2006	1	485*	
Greatest Hits II	Queen	1991	1	481	(Note: Including 317 weeks for The Platinum Collection, which includes all three Greatest Hits albums)
Greatest Hits	Foo Fighters	2009	4	481	
Singles	Maroon 5	2015	28	476*	
Diamonds	Elton John	2017	1	470*	(Note: The album reached its peak position in January 2025)
1	The Beatles	2000	1	467	
Doo-Wops & Hooligans	Bruno Mars	2010	1	463*	
Dua Lipa	Dua Lipa	2017	3	462	
Teenage Dream	Katy Perry	2010	1	458*	
Nevermind	Nirvana	1991	5	451	
+	Ed Sheeran	2011	1	444	
x	Ed Sheeran	2014	1	443	
21	Adele	2011	1	436	
The Fame	Lady Gaga	2009	1	423*	
50 Years – Don't Stop	Fleetwood Mac	2018	4	417*	
Greatest Hits	Guns N' Roses	2004	1	413	

== 200 to 399 weeks ==
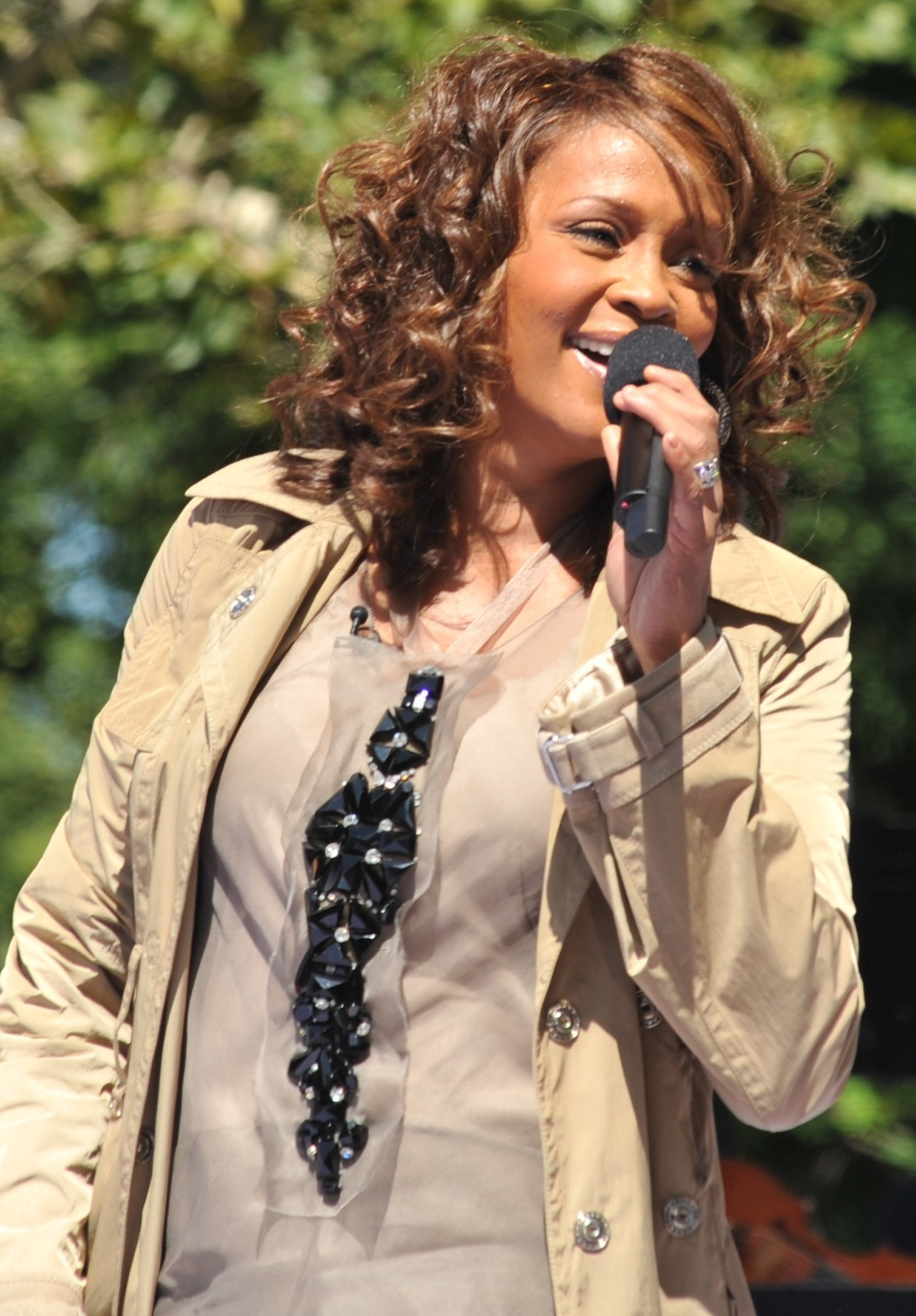
Whitney Houston has the longest charting greatest hits album by a female artist on the UK charts with The Ultimate Collection (388 weeks).

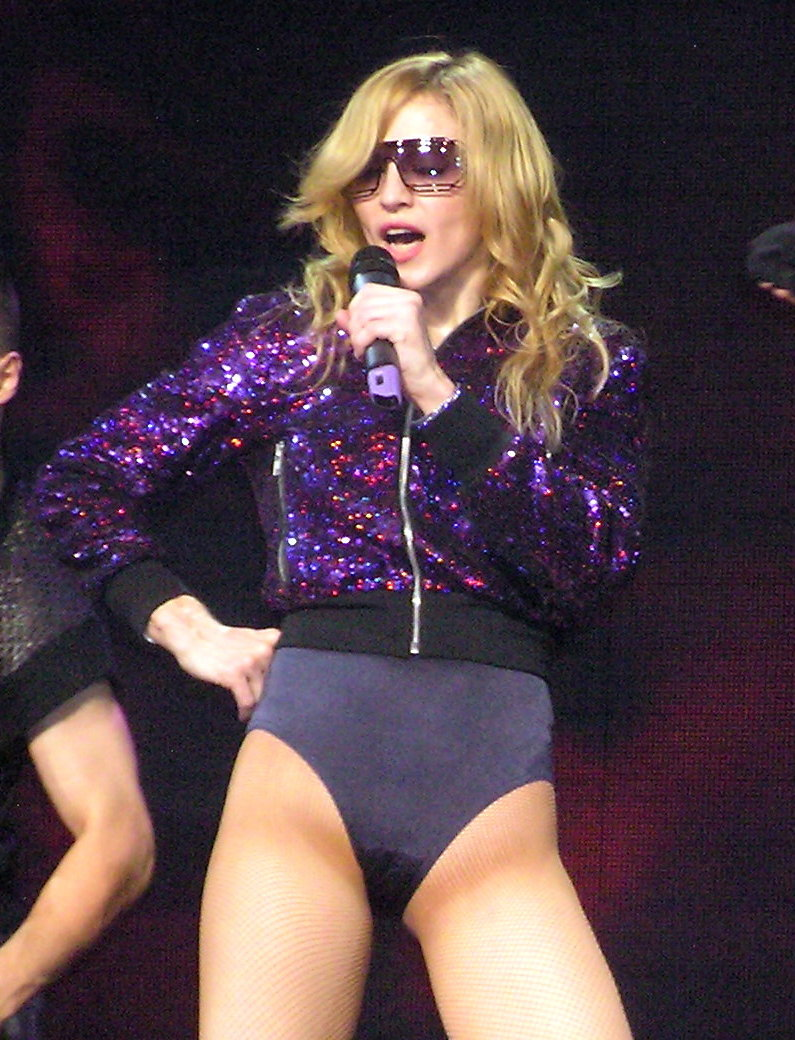
Madonna features twice on this list with The Immaculate Collection (363 weeks) and Like a Virgin (154 weeks), respectively.

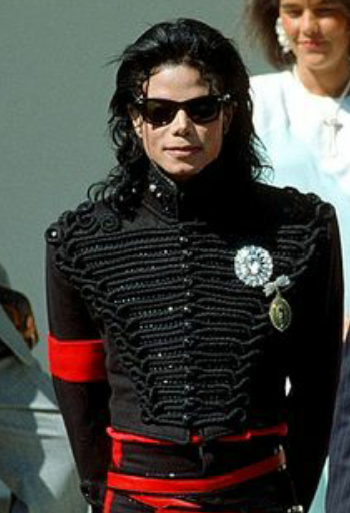
Michael Jackson has five albums that have charted for over 150 weeks: Number Ones (599 weeks), Thriller (322 weeks), The Essential Michael Jackson (283 weeks), Off the Wall (236 weeks) and Bad (215 weeks).

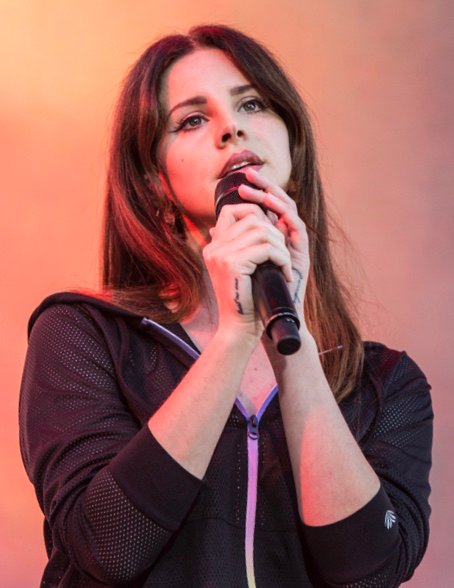
Lana Del Rey has charted for 380 weeks with her album Born to Die.

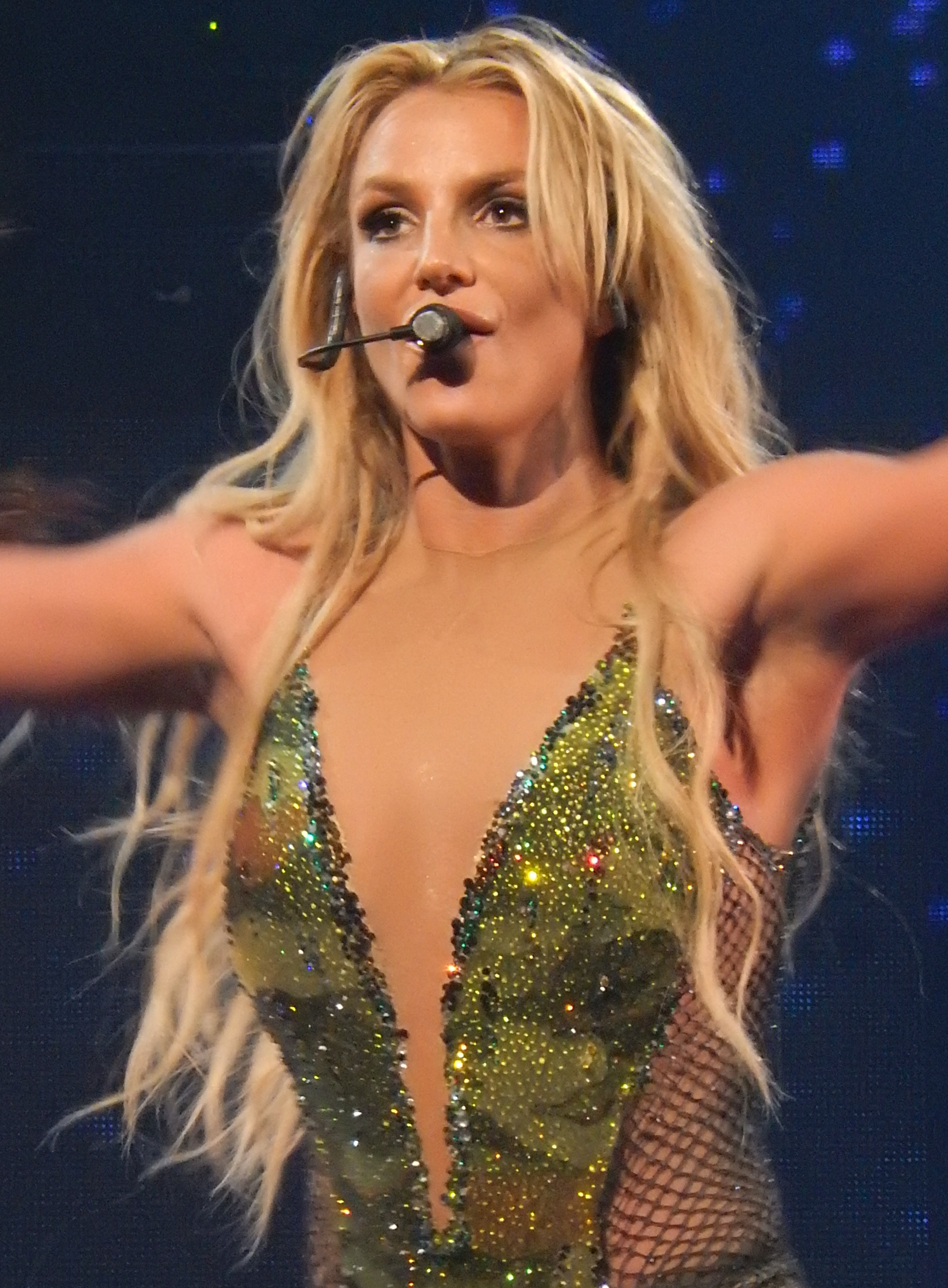
Britney Spears charted for 276 weeks with her greatest hits album The Singles Collection.

Title	Artist	Year first entered chart	Peak	Weeks	Ref
Greatest Hits: God's Favorite Band	Green Day	2017	22	392*	
The Ultimate Collection	Whitney Houston	2007	3	388	(Note: Including 2 weeks for box set with Whitney Houston Live: Her Greatest Performances)
Piano Man: The Very Best of Billy Joel	Billy Joel	2004	7	382*	
1989	Taylor Swift	2014	1	381	
Born to Die	Lana Del Rey	2012	1	380*	
The Sound of Music	Original Soundtrack	1965	1	376	
The Singles	Phil Collins	2016	2	365*	
25	Adele	2015	1	364	
The Immaculate Collection	Madonna	1990	1	363	
The Very Best of Fleetwood Mac	Fleetwood Mac	2002	6	363	
Simon and Garfunkel's Greatest Hits	Simon & Garfunkel	1972	2	354	
ELV1S: 30 #1 Hits	Elvis Presley	2002	1	353	
Good Girl Gone Bad	Rihanna	2007	1	352*	
Divinely Uninspired to a Hellish Extent	Lewis Capaldi	2019	1	344	
Direct Hits	The Killers	2013	5	338	
Bridge over Troubled Water	Simon & Garfunkel	1970	1	330	
1967–1970	The Beatles	1973	2	325*	(Note: Including 6 weeks for box set with 1962–1966 and 1967–1970)
Lover	Taylor Swift	2019	1	323	
The Definitive Collection	Stevie Wonder	2002	11	323*	
Thriller	Michael Jackson	1982	1	322*	(Note: Including 27 weeks for the 25th anniversary edition reissue, Thriller 25)
Jeff Wayne's Musical Version of The War of the Worlds	Jeff Wayne	1978	5	319	
The Platinum Collection	Queen	2000	2	317	
South Pacific	Original Soundtrack	1958	1	315	
Folklore	Taylor Swift	2020	1	308	
Face Value	Phil Collins	1981	1	300	(Note: includes 22 weeks as part of the Platinum Collection + 1 week as part of the Take a Look at Me boxed set + 1 week as part of the Take a Look at Me Now – Complete boxed set.)
The Highlights	The Weeknd	2021	2	301*	
Sgt. Pepper's Lonely Hearts Club Band	The Beatles	1967	1	295	(Note: includes 1 week as part of The Beatles in Mono boxed set + 1 week as part of The Beatles in Stereo boxed set)
Tracy Chapman	Tracy Chapman	1988	1	293	v
Tubular Bells	Mike Oldfield	1973	1	288	
Sour	Olivia Rodrigo	2021	1	286*	
1962–1966	The Beatles	1973	3	286	(Note: Including 6 weeks for box set with 1962–1966 and 1967–1970)
Appetite for Destruction	Guns N' Roses	1987	5	286	
The Essential Michael Jackson	Michael Jackson	2005	1	284*	
Best Of	50 Cent	2018	23	283*	
I Will Always Love You: The Best of Whitney Houston	Whitney Houston	2012	13	282*	
I Cry When I Laugh	Jess Glynne	2015	1	278	
Greatest Hits... So Far!!!	P!nk	2010	5	277	
The Singles Collection	Britney Spears	2009	38	276*	
Brothers in Arms	Dire Straits	1985	1	273	
When We All Fall Asleep, Where Do We Go?	Billie Eilish	2019	1	267	
Get Rich or Die Tryin'	50 Cent	2003	2	263*	
Graduation	Kanye West	2007	1	260*	
Reputation	Taylor Swift	2017	1	257	
Hot Fuss	The Killers	2004	1	256	
Fine Line	Harry Styles	2019	2	255	
Making Movies	Dire Straits	1980	4	252	
Don't Smile at Me	Billie Eilish	2018	12	247	
Automatic for the People	R.E.M.	1992	1	245	
Greatest Hits	Pitbull	2021	18	245*	
My Way: The Best of Frank Sinatra	Frank Sinatra	1997	7	244	
Between Us	Little Mix	2021	3	238*	
Off the Wall	Michael Jackson	1979	3	236	
The Sound of The Smiths	The Smiths	2008	21	229*	
Future Nostalgia	Dua Lipa	2020	1	224	
Jagged Little Pill	Alanis Morissette	1995	1	223	
19	Adele	2008	1	223	
Greatest Hits	Bon Jovi	2010	2	223*	
Hybrid Theory	Linkin Park	2001	4	223*	
Curtain Call 2	Eminem	2022	3	222*	
Never Forget – The Ultimate Collection	Take That	2005	2	218	
Sigh No More	Mumford & Sons	2009	2	218	
Bad	Michael Jackson	1987	1	216*	
The Stone Roses	The Stone Roses	1989	5	215	
Out of Time	R.E.M.	1991	1	214	
The Bends	Radiohead	1995	4	213	
No Jacket Required	Phil Collins	1985	1	208	(Note: Includes 10 weeks as part of the Take a Look at Me Now... The Complete Studio Collection box set and 22 weeks as part of The Platinum Collection box set)
All Over the World: The Very Best of Electric Light Orchestra	Electric Light Orchestra	2005	1	208	
Under a Blood Red Sky	U2	1983	2	204	
The King and I	Original Soundtrack	1956	1	203	
Nirvana	Nirvana	2002	3	203*	
Take Care	Drake	2011	5	203*	
SOS	SZA	2022	2	202*	
The Rise and Fall of Ziggy Stardust and the Spiders from Mars	David Bowie	1972	5	202	(Note: Including 1 week for box set Five Years (1969–1973), which includes the albums Space Oddity, The Man Who Sold the World, Hunky Dory, The Rise and Fall of Ziggy Stardust and the Spiders from Mars, Pin Ups, Aladdin Sane, Live Santa Monica '72 and Ziggy Stardust: The Motion Picture)
The Joshua Tree	U2	1987	1	201	
Hozier	Hozier	2014	3	201	
Love over Gold	Dire Straits	1982	1	200	

== 150 to 199 weeks ==
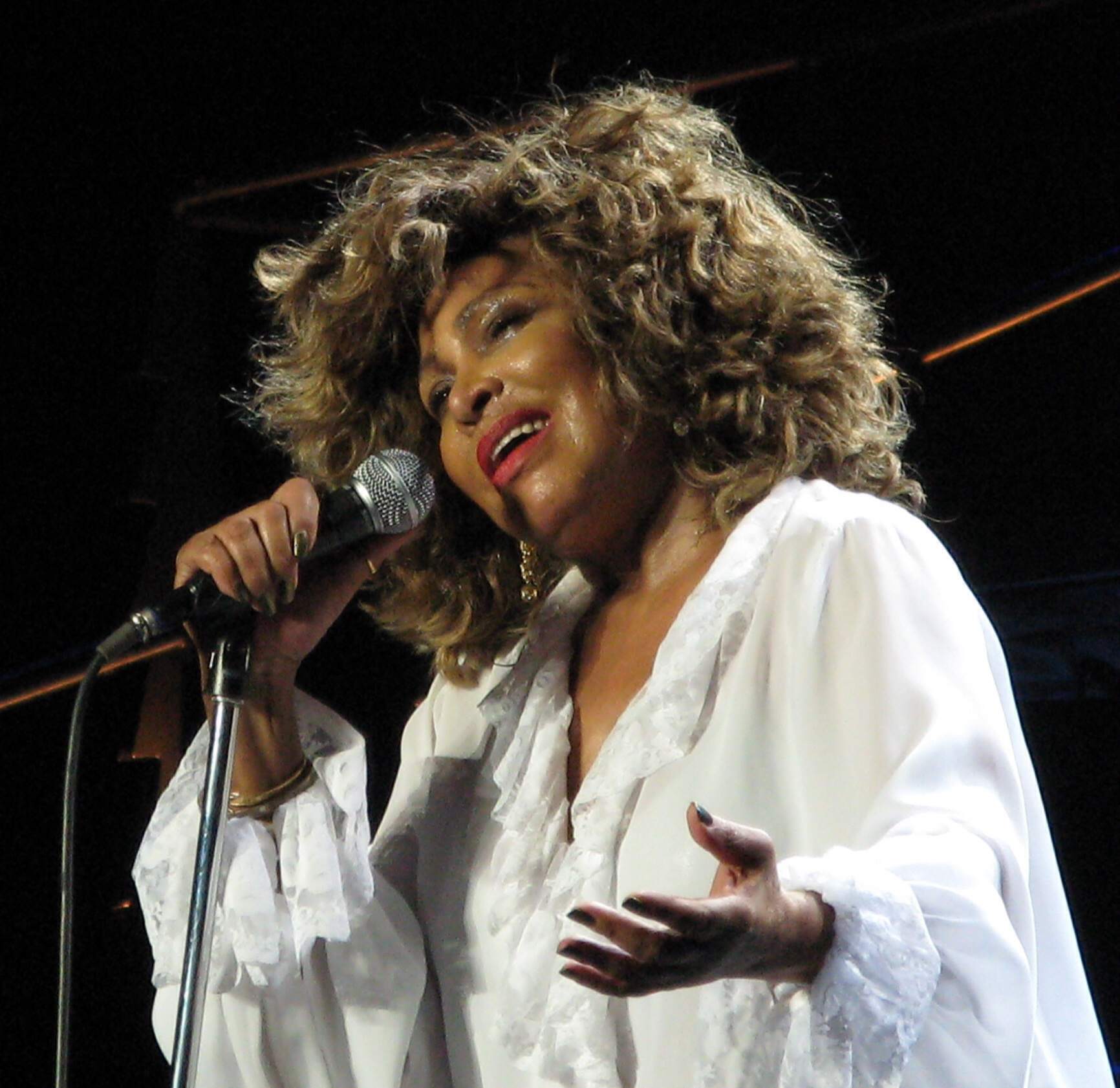
Tina Turner appears twice on this list with Simply the Best (183 weeks) and Private Dancer (150 weeks).

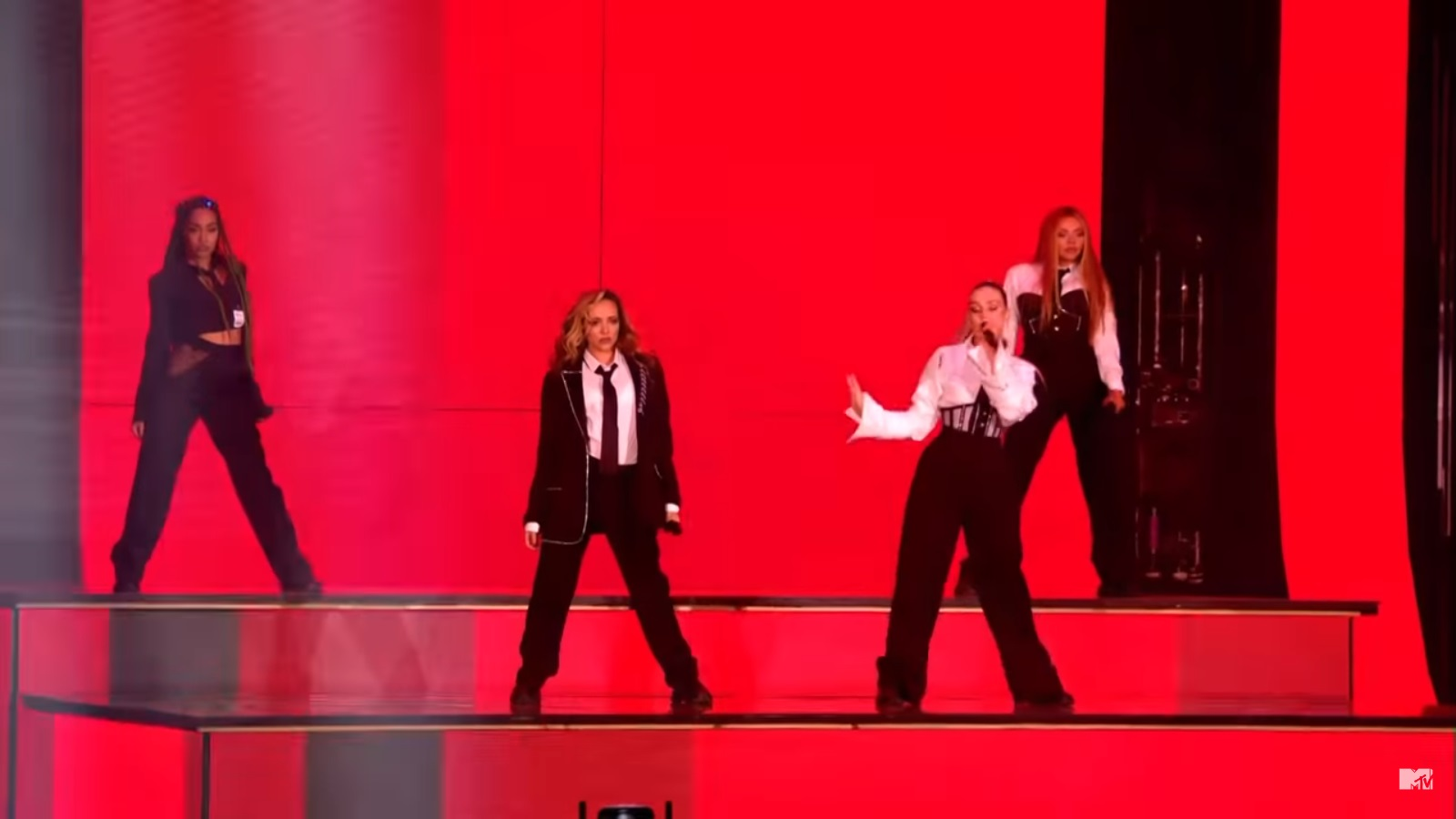
Little Mix have the longest charting studio album by a girl group with Glory Days (173 weeks).

Title	Artist	Year first entered chart	Peak	Weeks	Ref
Lungs	Florence and the Machine	2009	1	196	
?	XXXTentacion	2018	3	196	
Evermore	Taylor Swift	2020	1	194	
Parachutes	Coldplay	2000	1	193	
The Best of UB40 – Volume One	UB40	1987	3	192	(Note: Including 32 weeks for box set with Volume 1 and Volume 2)
Starboy	The Weeknd	2016	5	192	
Staying at Tamara's	George Ezra	2018	1	189	
The Diamond Collection	Post Malone	2023	14	186*	
Simply the Best	Tina Turner	1991	2	183	
Decade in the Sun: Best of Stereophonics	Stereophonics	2008	2	181	
Crazy Love	Michael Bublé	2009	1	180	
Wanted on Voyage	George Ezra	2014	1	180	
The 1975	The 1975	2013	1	179	
Stick Season	Noah Kahan	2023	1	179*	
The Very Best of the Eagles	Eagles	1994	3	179	(Note: Including 67 weeks for 2001 reissue with the same tracks in a different order)
These Streets	Paolo Nutini	2006	3	177	
White Ladder	David Gray	2000	1	176	
Hello, I Must Be Going!	Phil Collins	1982	2	176	
Forty Licks	The Rolling Stones	2002	2	176*	
West Side Story	Original Soundtrack	1962	1	175	
Ocean Drive	Lighthouse Family	1995	3	175	
The Best of Van Morrison	Van Morrison	1990	4	174	
Glory Days	Little Mix	2016	1	173	
Californication	Red Hot Chili Peppers	1999	5	169	
Stoney	Post Malone	2016	10	169	
Oklahoma!	Original Soundtrack	1956	1	168	
Goodbye & Good Riddance	Juice WRLD	2018	23	167	
Happier Than Ever	Billie Eilish	2021	1	167	
Guts	Olivia Rodrigo	2023	1	166*	
Only by the Night	Kings of Leon	2008	1	165	
Psychodrama	Dave	2019	1	165	
My Love: Essential Collection	Celine Dion	2008	5	165	
Talk on Corners	The Corrs	1997	1	164	
Alchemy – Dire Straits Live	Dire Straits	1984	3	164	
Graceland	Paul Simon	1986	1	163	
Urban Hymns	The Verve	1997	1	162	
Come On Over	Shania Twain	1998	1	162	
Best of Bowie	David Bowie	2002	1	162	
Word Gets Around	Stereophonics	1997	6	162	
Stars	Simply Red	1991	1	161	
Private Investigations	Dire Straits and Mark Knopfler	2005	20	160*	
The Eminem Show	Eminem	2002	1	159	
No.6 Collaborations Project	Ed Sheeran	2019	1	159	
Harry's House	Harry Styles	2022	1	157	
Midnights	Taylor Swift	2022	1	157	
My Fair Lady	Original Broadway Cast	1958	1	156	
Songbird	Eva Cassidy	1998	1	156	
Cross Road – The Best of Bon Jovi	Bon Jovi	1994	1	155	
=	Ed Sheeran	2021	1	155	
The Buddy Holly Story	Buddy Holly	1959	2	155	
Can't Slow Down	Lionel Richie	1983	1	154	
Like a Virgin	Madonna	1984	1	154	(Note: Including 1 week for box set The Complete Studio Albums (1983-2008), which includes the albums Madonna, Like a Virgin, True Blue, Like a Prayer, Erotica, Bedtime Stories, Ray of Light, Music, American Life, Confessions on a Dancefloor and Hard Candy)
Hunky Dory	David Bowie	1971	3	154	
The Balcony	Catfish and the Bottlemen	2014	10	154	
Come Away with Me	Norah Jones	2002	1	152	
Eyes Open	Snow Patrol	2006	1	151	
Best of The Beach Boys	The Beach Boys	1966	2	151	
Manilow Magic	Barry Manilow	1979	3	151	
Get to Know	Becky Hill	2019	20	151	
A Rush of Blood to the Head	Coldplay	2002	1	150	
Private Dancer	Tina Turner	1984	2	150	
The 50 Greatest Hits	Elvis Presley	2000	2	150	
Call Me Irresponsible	Michael Bublé	2007	2	150	

== Artists with the most entries ==
The following artists have 2 or more albums charting on the UK Album Charts for more than 150 weeks

Artist	Number of albums	Albums
Taylor Swift	6	List: 1. 1989 (381 weeks); 2. Lover (323 weeks); 3. Folklore (308 weeks); 4. Reputation (256 weeks); 5. Evermore (194 weeks); 6. Midnights (157 weeks)
Michael Jackson	5	List: 1. Number One (599 weeks); 2. Thriller (322 weeks); 3. The Essential Michael Jackson (284 weeks); 4. Off the Wall (236 weeks); 5. Bad (216 weeks)
Ed Sheeran	5	List: 1. ÷ (506 weeks); 2. + (444 weeks); 3. x (442 weeks); 4. No. 6 Collaborations Project (159 weeks); 5. = (155 weeks)
Dire Straits	5	List: 1. Brothers in Arms (273 weeks); 2. Making Movies (252 weeks); 3. Love over Gold (200 weeks); 4. Alchemy: Dire Straits Live (164 weeks); 5. Private Investigations (160 weeks)
David Bowie	4	List: 1. Legacy (The Very Best of David Bowie) (519 weeks); 2. The Rise and Fall of Ziggy Stardust and the Spiders from Mars (202 weeks); 3. Best of Bowie (162 weeks); 4. Hunky Dory (154 weeks)
Phil Collins	4	List: 1. The Singles (365 weeks); 2. Face Value (300 weeks); 3. No Jacket Required (208 weeks); 4. Hello, I Must Be Going! (176 weeks)
The Beatles	4	List: 1. 1 (469 weeks); 2. 1967-1970 (323 weeks); 3. Sgt. Pepper's Lonely Hearts Club Band (295 weeks); 4. 1962-1966 (286 weeks)
Adele	3	List: 1. 21 (436 weeks); 2. 25 (364 weeks); 3. 19 (223 weeks)
Billie Eilish	3	List: 1. When We All Fall Asleep, Where Do We Go? (267 weeks); 2. Don't Smile at Me (247 weeks); 3. Happier Than Ever (167 weeks)
Eminem	3	List: 1. Curtain Call: The Hits (748 weeks); 2. Curtain Call 2 (222 weeks); 3. The Eminem Show (159 weeks)
Fleetwood Mac	3	List: 1. Rumours (1175 weeks); 2. 50 Years - Don't Stop (417 weeks); 3. The Very Best of Fleetwood Mac (363 weeks)
Oasis	3	List: 1. (What's the Story) Morning Glory? (775 weeks); 2. Time Flies... 1994–2009 (688 weeks); 3. Definitely Maybe (671 weeks)
Queen	3	List: 1. Greatest Hits (1595 weeks); 2. Greatest Hits II (481 weeks); 3. The Platinum Collection (317 weeks)
Arctic Monkeys	2	List: 1. AM (687 weeks); 2. Whatever People Say I Am, That's What I'm Not (609 weeks)
Bon Jovi	2	List: 1. Greatest Hits (223 weeks); 2. Cross Road – The Best of Bon Jovi (155 weeks)
Coldplay	2	List: 1. Parachutes (193 weeks); 2. A Rush of Blood to the Head (150 weeks)
Dua Lipa	2	List: 1. Dua Lipa (462 weeks); 2. Future Nostalgia (224 weeks)
Elvis Presley	2	List: 1. ELV1S: 30 #1 Hits (353 weeks); 2. The 50 Greatest Hits (150 weeks)
George Ezra	2	List: 1. Staying at Tamara's (189 weeks); 2. Wanted on Voyage (180 weeks)
Guns 'N Roses	2	List: 1. Greatest Hits (413 weeks); 2. Appetite for Destruction (284 weeks)
Little Mix	2	List: 1. Between Us (238 weeks); 2. Glory Days (176 weeks)
Madonna	2	List: 1. The Immaculate Collection (363 weeks); 2. Like a Virgin (154 weeks)
Michael Bublé	2	List: 1. Crazy Love (180 weeks); 2. Call Me Irresponsible (150 weeks)
Nirvana	2	List: 1. Nevermind (451 weeks); 2. Nirvana (203 weeks)
Olivia Rodrigo	2	List: 1. Sour (286 weeks); 2. Guts (166 weeks)
Post Malone	2	List: 1. The Diamond Collection (186 weeks); 2. Stoney (169 weeks)
R.E.M	2	List: 1. Automatic for the People (245 weeks); 2. Out of Time (214 weeks)
Red Hot Chili Peppers	2	List: 1. Greatest Hits (537 weeks); 2. Californication (169 weeks)
Stereophonics	2	List: 1. Decade in the Sun: Best of Stereophonics (181 weeks); 2. Word Gets Around (162 weeks)
Simon & Garfunkel	2	List: 1. Simon and Garfunkel's Greatest Hits (354 weeks); 2. Bridge over Troubled Water (330 weeks)
The Killers	2	List: 1. Direct Hits (338 weeks); 2. Hot Fuss (256 weeks)
The Weeknd	2	List: 1. The Highlights (301 weeks); 2. Starboy (192 weeks)
Tina Turner	2	List: 1. Simply the Best (183 weeks); 2. Private Dancer (150 weeks)
U2	2	List: 1. Under a Blood Red Sky (204 weeks); 2. The Joshua Tree (201 weeks)
Whitney Houston	2	List: 1. The Ultimate Collection (388 weeks); 2. I Will Always Love You: The Best of Whitney Houston (282 weeks)
50 Cent	2	List: 1. Best Of (283 weeks); 2. Get Rich or Die Tryin' (263 weeks)

== See also ==
- List of songs which have spent the most weeks on the UK Singles Chart

== Books ==
- British Albums Chart: All Time Top 1000 by Michael Churchill. Published by Lulu.com, 2013.
