= No One Else Can Wear Your Crown =

Studio album by Oh Wonder
- Released: 7 February 2020
- Length: 30:41
- Label: Island
- Producer: Oh Wonder; Starsmith

Oh Wonder chronology
Ultralife (2017)	No One Else Can Wear Your Crown (2020)	22 Break (2021)

Professional ratings
Aggregate scores
Source	Rating
Metacritic	65/100
Review scores
Source	Rating
DIY	3/5 stars
The Line of Best Fit	7.5/10
Pitchfork	5.7/10

No One Else Can Wear Your Crown is the third studio album by London-based alt-pop duo Oh Wonder, released through Island Records on 7 February 2020. It was preceded by the release of the singles "Hallelujah", "Better Now", "I Wish I Never Met You" and "Happy". The duo embarked on a world tour in support of the album in March 2020. However, it was postponed due to the COVID-19 pandemic.

== Background and recording ==
Oh Wonder wrote and recorded the album at their home studio, and it was co-mixed by Cenzo Townshend.

== Track listing ==
No One Else Can Wear Your Crown track listing
No.	Title	Writer(s)	Length
1.	"Dust"	Josephine Vander Gucht; Anthony West	2:40
2.	"Happy"	Vander Gucht; West; Sasha Sloan	2:53
3.	"Better Now"	Vander Gucht; West; Joe Janiak	3:18
4.	"Hallelujah"	Vander Gucht; West	3:11
5.	"In and Out of Love"	Vander Gucht; West	2:57
6.	"How It Goes"	Vander Gucht; West; Finlay Dow-Smith	3:25
7.	"Drunk On You"	Vander Gucht; West; Dow-Smith; Lawrence Principato	3:09
8.	"Nothing But You"	Vander Gucht; West	3:16
9.	"I Wish I Never Met You"	Vander Gucht; West	2:58
10.	"Nebraska"	Vander Gucht; West	2:54
Total length:			30:41

Deluxe edition bonus tracks
No.	Title	Writer(s)	Length
11.	"Hallelujah" (acoustic)	Vander Gucht; West	3:46
12.	"Better Now" (acoustic)	Vander Gucht; West; Janiak	3:13
13.	"Happy" (acoustic)	Vander Gucht; West; Yatchenko	3:31
14.	"Drunk on You" (acoustic)	Vander Gucht; West; Dow-Smith; Principato	3:17
15.	"Hallelujah" (unplugged)	Vander Gucht; West	3:51
Total length:			48:19

== Personnel ==
Oh Wonder

- Josephine Vander Gucht – vocals, production (all tracks); mixing (tracks 1–12), piano (1–10), keyboards (1–9) string arrangement (1, 2, 4–7, 9, 10, 12, 13, 15), Wurlitzer electric piano (13)
- Anthony West – vocals, production, mixing (all tracks); keyboards, programming (1–10, 12, 13); guitar (2, 3, 10, 12, 13), bass guitar (9)

Additional musicians

- Maïa Collette – cello (tracks 1, 2, 4, 5, 7, 9, 10, 12, 13)
- Helen Sanders-Hewett – viola (tracks 1, 2, 4, 5, 7, 9, 10, 12)
- Rosie Langley – violin (tracks 1, 2, 4, 5, 7, 9, 10, 12)
- Tobie Tripp – violin (tracks 1, 2, 4, 5, 7, 9, 10, 12), horn arrangement (12, 13, 15), string arrangement (12, 13, 15), strings (15)
- George Lindsay – programming (tracks 1, 2, 6, 12, 15), drums (6, 8, 10, 12, 13, 15)
- Yves Fernandez – bass guitar (tracks 1, 3, 4, 6–8)
- Fin Dow-Smith – piano (track 6), keyboards (7)
- Jonny Abraham – trumpet (track 6)
- Jess Cox – cello (tracks 12, 13, 15)
- James Trood – drums (tracks 12, 13, 15)
- Dan Beer – French horn (tracks 12, 13, 15)
- Diana Sheach – French horn (tracks 12, 13, 15)
- Edward Ashby – sousaphone (tracks 12, 13, 15)
- Courtney Brown – trombone (tracks 12, 13, 15)
- Thomas George White – trombone (tracks 12, 13, 15)
- Jack Birchwood – trumpet (tracks 12, 13, 15)
- Nick Mead – trumpet (tracks 12, 13, 15)
- George White – viola (tracks 12, 13, 15)
- Ciara Ismail – violin (tracks 12, 13, 15)
- Oli Langford – violin (tracks 12, 13, 15)
- ACM Gospel Choir (Note: The ACM Gospel Choir consists of arranger Mark De-Lisser and vocalists Adam Wallis, Charlotte Churchmann, Charlotte Lubbock-Stevens, Chess Galea, Chloe Sanders, Debby Bracknell, Gneg Dwight, Hermione Thomas, Joanna Breheny, Jonathan Owusu-Yianomah, Jonny De Mallet Morgan, Kedma Macias, Rachel Clark, Seonaid Bowers, Toni Reece Robinson, and Wilson Atie.) – choir (tracks 13, 15)

Technical

- Frank Arkwright – mastering
- Cenzo Townshend – mixing (tracks 1–10)
- Camden Clarke – mixing assistance (tracks 1–10)
- Robert Sellens – mixing assistance (tracks 1–10)
- Starsmith – production (track 7), additional production (6)
- Jason McIntosh – engineering (tracks 12, 13, 15)
- Andy Cook – engineering assistance (tracks 12, 13, 15)
- Rowan McIntosh – engineering assistance (track 15)

== Charts ==
Chart performance for No One Else Can Wear Your Crown
Chart (2020)	Peak position
Australian Digital Albums (ARIA)	46
Belgian Albums (Ultratop Flanders)	84
Dutch Albums (Album Top 100)	86
Scottish Albums (OCC)	17
UK Albums (OCC)	8
