= Oh Wonder (album) =

Studio album by Oh Wonder
- Released: 4 September 2015
- Recorded: 2014–2015
- Genre: Indie pop; electropop; alternative
- Length: 52:23
- Label: Island; Republic; Caroline

Oh Wonder chronology
Oh Wonder (2015)	Ultralife (2017)

Singles from Oh Wonder
- 1. "Body Gold" Released: 1 September 2014; 2. "Shark" Released: 1 October 2014; 3. "Dazzle" Released: 1 November 2014; 4. "All We Do" Released: 1 December 2014; 5. "The Rain" Released: 1 January 2015; 6. "Lose It" Released: 1 February 2015; 7. "Technicolour Beat" Released: 1 March 2015; 8. "Midnight Moon" Released: 1 April 2015; 9. "Livewire" Released: 1 May 2015; 10. "White Blood" Released: 1 June 2015; 11. "Landslide" Released: 1 July 2015; 12. "Drive" Released: 1 August 2015; 13. "Heart Hope" Released: 1 September 2015; 14. "Without You" Released: 4 September 2015; 15. "Plans" Released: 4 September 2015

Oh Wonder is the debut studio album by English alt-pop duo Oh Wonder, self-released on 4 September 2015. The album is the accumulation of singles released monthly throughout 2014–2015, in addition to two unreleased songs.

== Background ==
Starting in September 2014, Anthony West and Josephine Vander Gucht wrote, recorded, and released one song on the first of every month for a year on SoundCloud. They have described the creation and release of their debut album as nontraditional, stating that the album consists of 15 singles and was never conceived as an entire record. The debut album consisted of all 13 songs, as well as 2 additional songs, "Without You" and "Plans". The album was written, produced, and mixed by West and Vander Gucht in their home studio in South-East London in 2014–2015.

The album has sold over 1,000,000 copies worldwide (it was the first-ever album to sell 1 million copies on an independent label) and has amassed in excess of 1.5 billion streams. It has been certified gold in the UK, gold in Canada, and platinum in both Russia and the Philippines.

== Critical reception ==
Oh Wonder received mixed to positive reviews from critics. Serena Weiss of The Ithacan hailed the album as "simplistically stunning" and "hauntingly beautiful", while praising the chemistry between Gucht and West. Music critic Abby Jefers described the albums creation story as “unique” and the music as “astounding.” Marcus Floyd of Renowned for Sound described the album as "airy" and "refreshing."

Professional ratings
Review scores
Source	Rating
AllMusic	3/5 stars
The Guardian	2/5 stars
Renowned for Sound	3/5 stars
The Ithacan	4/5 stars

== Usage in media ==
The song "All We Do" was used as the theme tune to opening credits of the ITV police drama series Unforgotten; at the end of the "Miss Taken" episode of the CBS drama Elementary; in the "Remains of the Day" episode of the drama Saving Hope; in an episode of ITV's Coronation Street; in the 2015 MTV American slasher horror series Scream; and in Episode 4 of the 2020 Australian crime drama Halifax:Retribution.

Scream also featured the song "Shark" in season 1 episode 2, and "Technicolor Beat" in season 1 episode 5. The song "Drive" was used in the pilot episode of the 2015 BBC drama Doctor Foster. “White Blood" was featured in season 3, episode 2 of The CW drama Reign.

The first verse of the song "Landslide" was sampled in rapper Lil Uzi Vert's song "The Way Life Goes" from their album Luv Is Rage 2, as well as retaining some of the original vocals, so Oh Wonder are credited as featured artists on the song.

== Track listing ==
All tracks are written by Josephine Vander Gucht and Anthony West.

No.	Title	Length
1.	"Livewire"	3:24
2.	"Body Gold"	3:05
3.	"Technicolour Beat"	3:00
4.	"Drive"	3:16
5.	"Lose It"	3:50
6.	"Landslide"	3:28
7.	"White Blood"	4:17
8.	"Without You"	3:45
9.	"The Rain"	2:54
10.	"Dazzle"	3:07
11.	"All We Do"	3:34
12.	"Midnight Moon"	3:31
13.	"Shark"	3:07
14.	"Heart Hope"	4:09
15.	"Plans"	3:59
Total length:		52:23

== Charts ==
Chart (2015–16)	Peak position
Australian Albums (ARIA)	56
Belgian Albums (Ultratop Flanders)	55
Belgian Albums (Ultratop Wallonia)	135
Canadian Albums (Billboard)	19
Dutch Albums (Album Top 100)	50
Irish Albums (IRMA)	54
Scottish Albums (OCC)	39
Swiss Albums (Schweizer Hitparade)	87
UK Albums (OCC)	26
UK Album Downloads (OCC)	20
US Billboard 200	80

== Certifications ==
Region	Certification	Certified units/sales
Canada (Music Canada)	Gold	40,000^{‡}
United Kingdom (BPI)	Gold	100,000^{‡}
^{‡} Sales+streaming figures based on certification alone.
