= Christmas with Elvis and the Royal Philharmonic Orchestra =

Compilation album by Elvis Presley with the Royal Philharmonic Orchestra
- Released: 6 October 2017
- Length: 34:06 (standard); 47:40 (deluxe)
- Label: RCA, Legacy
- Producer: Nick Patrick, Don Reedman (also exec.), Priscilla Presley (exec.)

Elvis Presley chronology
Elvis Symphonique (2017)	Christmas with Elvis and the Royal Philharmonic Orchestra (2017)	Elvis Presley: The Searcher (2018)

Singles from Christmas with Elvis and the Royal Philharmonic Orchestra
- 1. "Here Comes Santa Claus" Released: 4 December 2017; 2. "Silver Bells" Released: 14 December 2017; 3. "I'll Be Home for Christmas" Released: 15 December 2017; 4. "Blue Christmas" Released: 21 December 2017

Christmas with Elvis and the Royal Philharmonic Orchestra (also known as Christmas with Elvis) is a compilation album by American singer Elvis Presley (1935–77). It was released on 6 October 2017, by RCA Records and Legacy Recordings. It is the third album recorded with the Royal Philharmonic Orchestra, following If I Can Dream (2015) and The Wonder of You (2016), both of which topped the UK Albums Chart. The album features archival vocal recordings of Elvis from the albums Elvis' Christmas Album (1957) and Elvis sings The Wonderful World of Christmas (1971) accompanied by new orchestral arrangements by the Royal Philharmonic Orchestra. A deluxe edition of the album, which contains four new tracks, was released on 24 November 2017.

== Commercial performance ==
The album debuted at number one on the Billboard Classical Albums chart (for the issue dated 28 October 2017). In the UK, it debuted at number 22 on the UK Albums Chart, selling 3,572 units in its first week. However, it reached a new peak of number six on 1 December 2017, following the release of the deluxe edition. It was awarded Gold certification by BPI reflecting sales of over 100,000 copies.

== Track listing ==
No.	Title	Writer(s)	Length
1.	"Santa Claus Is Back in Town"	Jerry Leiber and Mike Stoller	2:29
2.	"White Christmas"	Irving Berlin	2:42
3.	"Here Comes Santa Claus (Right Down Santa Claus Lane)"	Gene Autry, Oakley Haldeman	2:03
4.	"Merry Christmas Baby"	Lou Baxter, Johnny Moore	4:50
5.	"Blue Christmas"	Billy Hayes, Jay Johnson	2:09
6.	"I'll Be Home for Christmas"	Kim Gannon, Walter Kent, Buck Ram	3:17
7.	"Winter Wonderland"	Felix Bernard, Richard B. Smith	2:20
8.	"Santa Bring My Baby Back (To Me)"	Aaron Schroeder, Claude Demetrius	1:52
9.	"Silver Bells"	Jay Livingston, Ray Evans	2:56
10.	"O Little Town of Bethlehem"	Phillips Brooks, Lewis Redner	2:50
11.	"O Come, All Ye Faithful"	John Francis Wade, Frederick Oakeley	3:04
12.	"The First Noel"	Traditional	2:54
13.	"Silent Night"	Joseph Mohr, Franz Gruber, John Freeman Young	2:40

Deluxe version (bonus tracks)
No.	Title	Writer(s)	Length
14.	"(There'll Be) Peace in the Valley (For Me)"	Thomas A. Dorsey	3:26
15.	"I Believe"	Ervin Drake, Irvin Graham, Jimmy Shirl, Al Stillman	3:00
16.	"Take My Hand, Precious Lord"	Thomas A. Dorsey	3:42
17.	"It Is No Secret (What God Can Do)"	Stuart Hamblen	4:26

== Charts ==
=== Weekly charts ===
Chart (2017)	Peak position
Australian Albums (ARIA)	7
Austrian Albums (Ö3 Austria)	25
Belgian Albums (Ultratop Flanders)	70
Belgian Albums (Ultratop Wallonia)	83
Canadian Albums (Billboard)	31
Dutch Albums (Album Top 100)	85
Irish Albums (IRMA)	11
New Zealand Albums (RMNZ)	7
Norwegian Albums (VG-lista)	36
Scottish Albums (OCC)	9
Swiss Albums (Schweizer Hitparade)	66
UK Albums (OCC)	6
US Billboard 200	73
US Top Classical Albums (Billboard)	1

=== Year-end charts ===
Chart (2017)	Position
Australian Albums (ARIA)	60
UK Albums (OCC)	37

== Certifications ==
Region	Certification	Certified units/sales
United Kingdom (BPI)	Gold	100,000^{‡}
^{‡} Sales+streaming figures based on certification alone.
