= Oh Wonder =

English pop duo

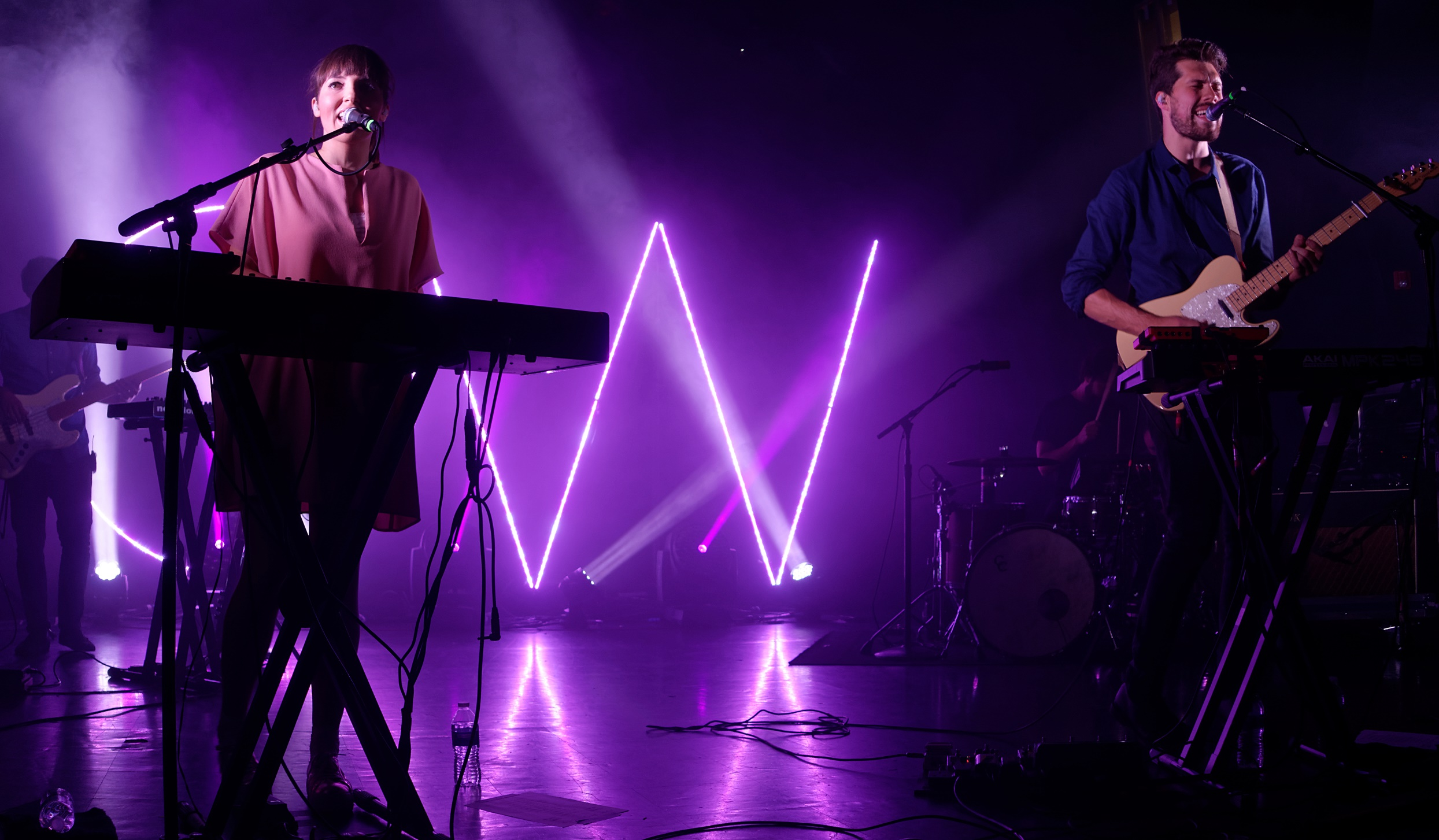
- Oh Wonder performing in 2016

Background information
- Origin: London, England
- Genres: Indie pop; alternative R&B; electropop; synthpop
- Years active: 2014–present
- Labels: Caroline International; Island; Dew Process; Republic
- Members: Josephine Vander West; Anthony Vander West
- Website: ohwondermusic.com

Oh Wonder are an English, London-based alt-pop duo consisting of Anthony Vander West (né West) and Josephine Vander West (née Vander Gucht). Since releasing their debut album, they have seen international success with their alt-pop singles. Oh Wonder recorded and released one song a month for a year, starting in September 2014. All of the songs were released together as a self-titled debut album in September 2015. In July 2017, the duo released their second album, Ultralife. In February 2020, they released their third album, No One Else Can Wear Your Crown. In October 2021, the now-married duo released their fourth studio album, 22 Break. In October 2022, they issued their fifth studio album, 22 Make. In September 2024, they began their 10 Years On project, where they re-recorded all of the tracks on their debut album, releasing them on a monthly basis during 2024 and 2025, with the finished album, Oh Wonder (10 Years On), coming out in September 2025.

The band played sold-out shows in London, Paris, New York, and Los Angeles one week after their debut album release, which marked the beginning of their touring career. They have since played multiple headline shows and festivals in numerous countries.

== History ==
=== Formation and early years ===
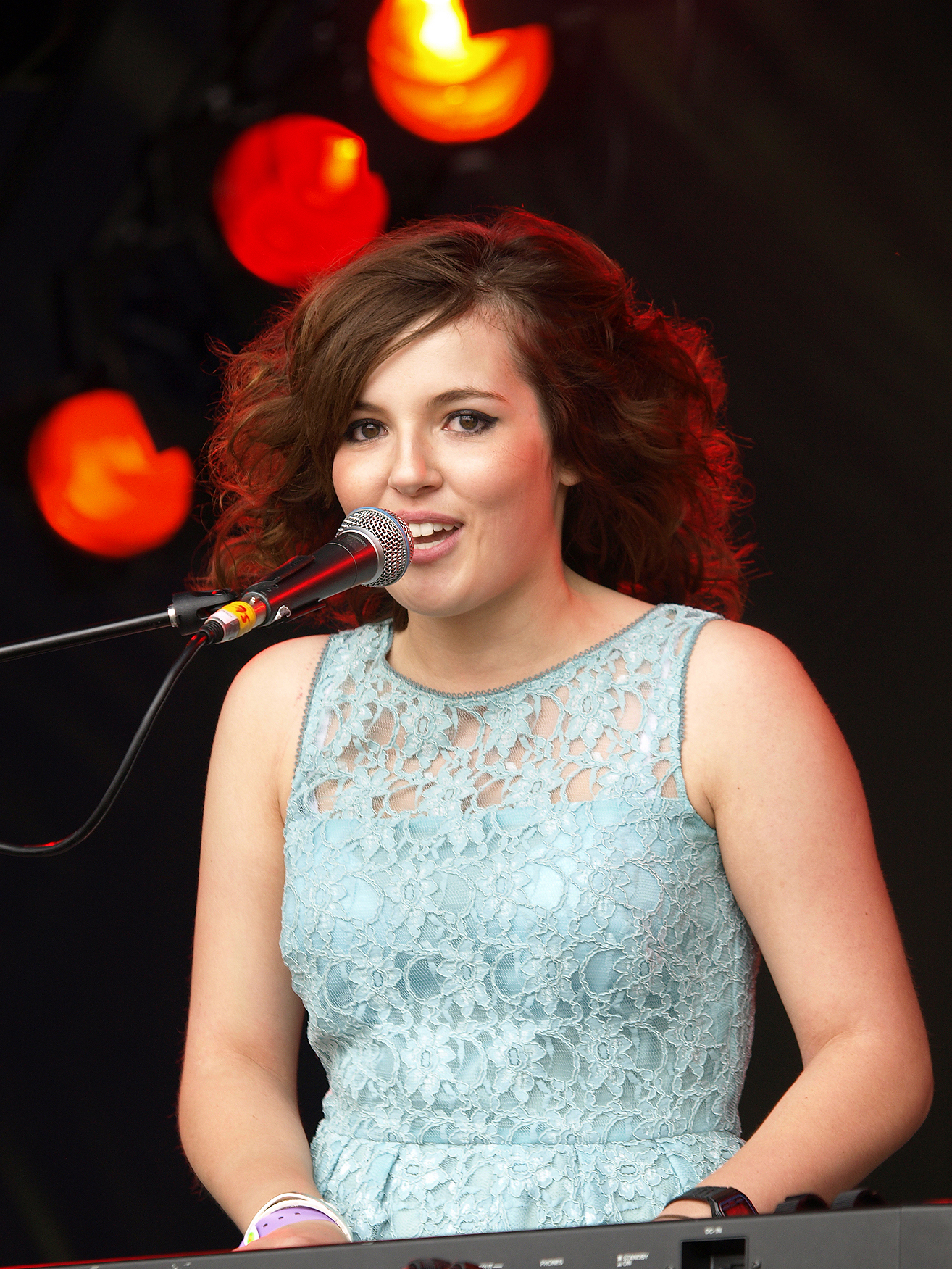
Josephine Vander West performing as a solo artist in 2010

Before Oh Wonder was formed, Josephine was a solo artist, first going by Jose Vanders and later under the alias LAYLA. Anthony was originally part of the groups Tonight Is Goodbye, Futures, and We the Wild. The two first met in High Wycombe on 21 March 2010, when Anthony was in the audience at one of Josephine's solo gigs. A year later, she attended one of his shows, talked with him, and they began writing songs and making music together.

The duo released their first two songs under the name Wonder Wonder but changed it to Oh Wonder when they learned of another band with a similar name.

=== 2014–2016: Oh Wonder ===
Oh Wonder had an unorthodox approach to releasing their eponymous debut album, Oh Wonder. Over the course of a year, the duo released one new single each month, beginning 1 September 2014, having written, produced, and mixed each song in their home studio in London. These monthly installations culminated in the 2015 release of that first album, which also included two previously unreleased songs. The record reached number 26 on the UK Albums Chart, number 16 on the Canadian Albums Chart, and number 80 on the US Billboard 200.

Oh Wonder gave their debut live performance for BBC Radio 1 at Maida Vale Studios, after receiving avid support from BBC Introducing and DJs Huw Stephens and Greg James. The band's first TV performance was on Conan, which aired in the US on 20 January 2016. They performed their single "Lose It".

Since their debut album release, Oh Wonder has toured internationally in the United Kingdom, France, Belgium, Germany, Sweden, Norway, Denmark, the Netherlands, Russia, Australia, Canada, and the United States. Their performance in Manila was their first show in Asia. They also toured as the opening act on the final installment of the Badlands Tour with Halsey from 21 July to 12 August 2016. Their 2016 debut festival appearances included Bonnaroo, Firefly, and Lollapalooza music festivals in the United States, in addition to Live Out in Monterrey, WayHome Festival in Oro-Medonte, Canada, and Electric Picnic in Stradbally, Ireland.

=== 2016–2018: Ultralife ===
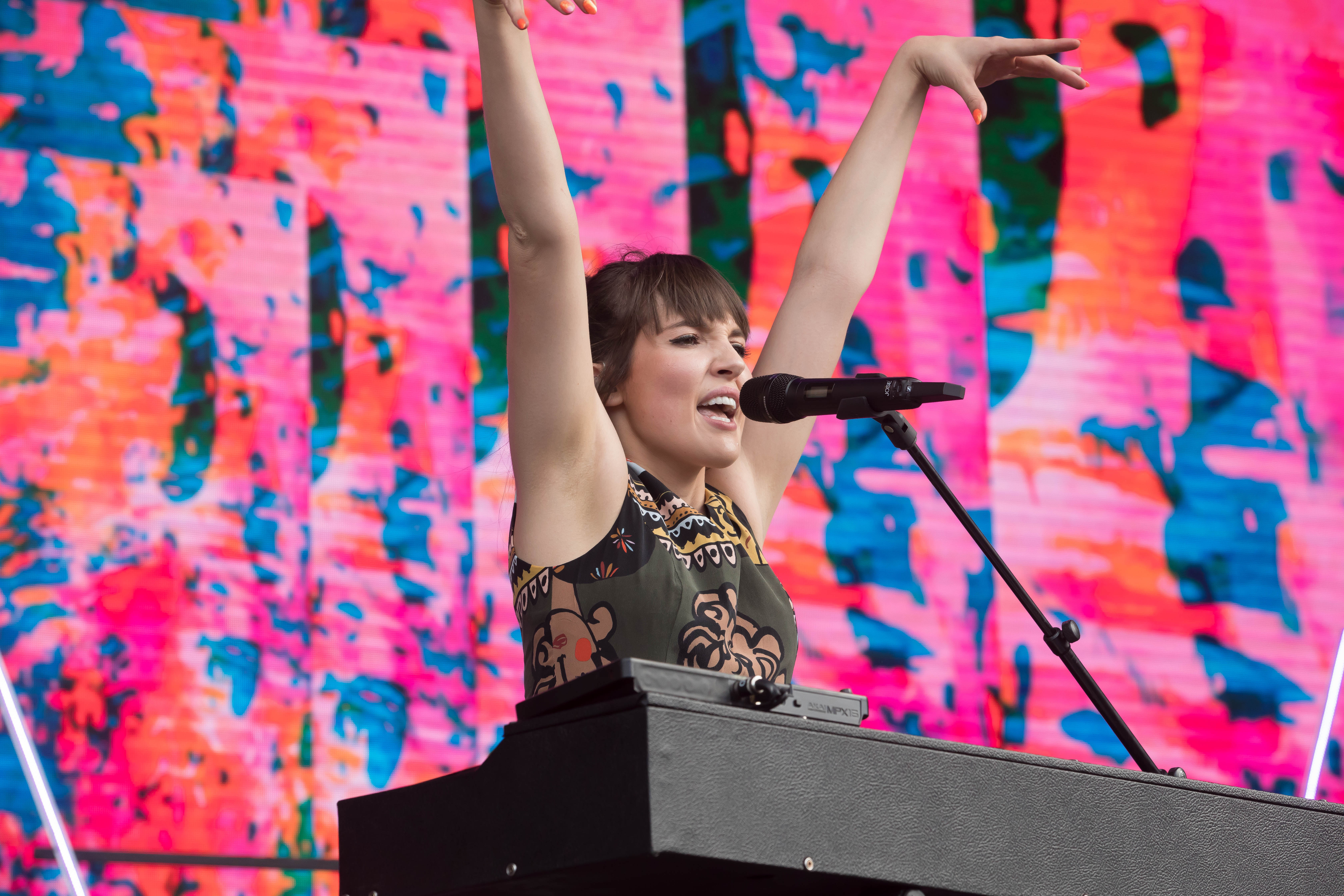
Josephine Vander West on the Ultralife World Tour in 2018

On 30 March 2017, Oh Wonder announced that they'd finished their second studio album, to be titled Ultralife. The record's lead track, "Ultralife", was released the day after. As with their previous album, the group released new singles every two weeks in the run-up to the album's publication.

The duo embarked on the Ultralife World Tour in 2017, which saw them play a long run of headline shows in 34 countries across Asia, Australia, Europe, and North and South America. They also played three shows with Beck on his 2018 North America Tour.

=== 2019–2020: No One Else Can Wear Your Crown and Home Tapes ===
On 5 September 2019, Oh Wonder released "Hallelujah", the first single from their upcoming album, followed by "Better Now" on 25 October and "I Wish I Never Met You" on 14 November. The same day, they announced via Twitter that the album, titled No One Else Can Wear Your Crown, would be released on 7 November. This was followed by the singles "This Christmas", "Happy", and "In and Out of Love". As part of the press coverage around their third album, Josephine and Anthony revealed they were in a relationship and had been for the past seven years.

The pair were to embark on a tour to support No One Else Can Wear Your Crown throughout Europe and North America in March 2020; however, the latter part of the tour, including the entirety of the North American segment, was postponed due to the COVID-19 pandemic.

Whilst subject to the 2020 UK "stay at home" restrictions related to the novel coronavirus, Oh Wonder released a series of new tracks on an EP titled Home Tapes.

=== 2021–2022: 22 Break and 22 Make ===
Oh Wonder performing in Kingston upon Thames in 2022

On 22 September 2021, Oh Wonder announced their fourth studio album, 22 Break, and released the title track. Described by the duo as "maybe the first break-up album in history written and recorded with the person you're breaking up with", the album documents their near-split in 2020 during the COVID-19 pandemic and their time away from touring. It was released on 8 October 2021, alongside a 40-minute black-and-white short film accompanying the record in full.

On 7 October 2022, the band published a sequel album, 22 Make, as a celebration of their relationship.

=== 2024: That Woman ===
In March 2024, Josephine announced that she had been working on a solo album under the stage name That Woman, with Anthony serving only as a producer. Her debut single, "Hymn for a Woman" was released independently on 3 May 2024. In August 2024, she issued her debut solo album, Find Joy.

=== 2024–2026: Oh Wonder (10 Years On) ===
In September 2024, Oh Wonder announced their 10 Years On project, where they re-recorded each track from their debut album and released one per month, culminating in Oh Wonder (10 Years On) released in September 2025. In June 2025, they announced the UK/EU tour Songs at the Piano, which ran from October until November. The duo subsequently toured the US and Canada in April and May 2026. The tour featured a grand piano and a string quartet and received positive reviews from audiences, with most dates selling out.

== Personal life ==
Anthony and Josephine married in July 2021, and both changed their surnames to Vander West. Their daughter was born on 7 November 2024.

They run a complex of music recording studios, Highwater, located on the bank of the River Thames in Deptford, London, as well as a coffee shop, NOLA Coffee, located in the London district of Peckham. "NOLA is an embodiment of all their favourite experiences of cafes around the world distilled into one beautiful space".

== Discography ==
=== Studio albums ===
List of studio albums, with selected chart positions, details and certifications
Title	Album details	Peak chart positions									Certifications
Title	Album details	UK	AUS	BEL (Fl)	BEL (Wa)	CAN	IRE	NLD	SWI	US	Certifications
Oh Wonder	Released: 4 September 2015; Label: Self-released, Republic, Caroline International; Format: CD, digital download, vinyl	26	—	55	135	19	54	50	87	80	BPI: Gold; MC: Gold; IFPI Danmark: Gold
Ultralife	Released: 14 July 2017; Label: Island, Republic; Format: CD, digital download, vinyl	8	37	28	115	17	38	48	62	76	
No One Else Can Wear Your Crown	Released: 7 February 2020; Label: Island; Format: CD, digital download, vinyl, streaming	8	—	84	—	—	—	86	—	—	
22 Break	Released: 8 October 2021; Label: Island; Format: CD, digital download, vinyl, streaming	51	—	—	—	—	—	—	—	—	
22 Make	Released: 7 October 2022; Label: Island; Format: CD, digital download, vinyl, streaming	—	—	123	—	—	—	—	—	—	
"—" denotes a recording that did not chart or was not released in that territory.

=== EP ===
- Home Tapes (2020)

=== Singles ===
==== As lead artist ====
List of singles as a lead artist, with selected chart positions, showing year released and album name
Title	Year	Peak chart positions		Certifications	Album
Title	Year	BEL (Fl) Tip	US Rock	Certifications	Album
"Body Gold"	2014	—	—		Oh Wonder
"Shark"	2014	—	—		Oh Wonder
"Dazzle"	2014	—	—		Oh Wonder
"All We Do"	2014	—	—	BPI: Silver	Oh Wonder
"The Rain"	2014	—	—		Oh Wonder
"Lose It"	2015	—	45	ARIA: Gold	Oh Wonder
"Technicolour Beat"	2015	—	—		Oh Wonder
"Midnight Moon"	2015	—	—		Oh Wonder
"Livewire"	2015	—	—		Oh Wonder
"White Blood"	2015	—	—		Oh Wonder
"Landslide"	2015	103	—		Oh Wonder
"Drive"	2015	6	—	ARIA: Gold	Oh Wonder
"Heart Hope"	2015	—	—		Oh Wonder
"Without You"	2015	34	—		Oh Wonder
"Plans"	2015	—	—		Oh Wonder
"Ultralife"	2017	47	36		Ultralife
"Lifetimes"	2017	—	48		Ultralife
"My Friends"	2017	—	—		Ultralife
"Heavy"	2017	—	—		Ultralife
"High on Humans"	2017	—	—		Ultralife
"Solo"	2017	—	—		Ultralife
"All About You"	2017	—	—		Ultralife
"Bigger Than Love"	2017	—	—		Ultralife
"Heart Strings"	2017	—	—		Ultralife
"Slip Away"	2017	—	—		Ultralife
"Overgrown"	2017	—	—		Ultralife
"Waste"	2017	—	—		Ultralife
"Hallelujah"	2019	42	—		No One Else Can Wear Your Crown
"Better Now"	2019	—	—		No One Else Can Wear Your Crown
"I Wish I Never Met You"	2019	—	—		No One Else Can Wear Your Crown
"This Christmas"	2019	—	—		Non-album single
"Happy"	2020	46	—		No One Else Can Wear Your Crown
"In and Out of Love"	2020	—	—		No One Else Can Wear Your Crown
"Lonely Star"	2020	—	—		Home Tapes
"Keep on Dancing"	2020	—	—		Home Tapes
"I Like It When You Love Me"	2020	—	—		Home Tapes
"22 Break"	2021	—	—		22 Break
"Don't Let the Neighbourhood Hear"	2021	—	—		22 Break
"Rollercoaster Baby"	2021	—	—		22 Break
"Magnificent"	2022	—	—		22 Make
"Fuck It I Love You"	2022	—	—		22 Make
"True Romance"	2022	—	—		22 Make
"Can We Always Be Friends?"	2022	—	—		22 Make
"—" denotes singles that did not chart or were not released in that territory.

==== As featured artist ====
List of singles as a featured artist, with selected chart positions, showing year released and album name
Title	Year	Peak chart positions							Certifications	Album
Title	Year	UK	AUS	CAN	NZ Heat.	US	US Dance	US R&B/HH	Certifications	Album
"The Way Life Goes" (Lil Uzi Vert featuring Oh Wonder or also Nicki Minaj)	2017	87	85	48	4	24	—	13	RIAA: 4× Platinum; BPI: Platinum; IFPI DEN: Gold; RMNZ: 4× Platinum	Luv Is Rage 2
"Superlove" (Whethan featuring Oh Wonder)	2018	—	—	—	—	—	48	—		Non-album single
"—" denotes a recording that did not chart or was not released in that territory.

=== Other charted songs ===
Title	Year	Peak chart positions	Album
Title	Year	US Dance	Album
"How Would I Know" (with Kygo)	2020	33	Golden Hour

=== Songwriting and production credits ===
Title	Year	Artist	Album	Contributing member(s)	Songwriter	Producer
"Echoes"	2015	Lauren Aquilina	Non-album single	Anthony Vander West	check	check
"Echoes"	2015	Lauren Aquilina	Non-album single	Josephine Vander West	check	
"Hello Hello"	2017	Lewis Watson	Midnight	Both	check	check
"Deep the Water"	2017	Lewis Watson	Midnight	Both	check	check
"Forever"	2017	Lewis Watson	Midnight	Both	check	check
"Give Me Life"	2017	Lewis Watson	Midnight	Both	check	check
"Slumber"	2017	Lewis Watson	Midnight	Both	check	check
"Fly"	2017	Meadowlark	Postcards	Anthony Vander West		check
"Eyes Wide"	2017	Meadowlark	Postcards	Anthony Vander West		check
"Slow Fade"	2019	Ruth B.	Maybe I'll Find You Again	Both	check	check
"Personal Best"	2019	Maisie Peters	It's Your Bed Babe, It's Your Funeral	Both	check	check
"Nothing Like You" (with Droeloe featuring Hana)	2019	Gryffin	Gravity	Both	check	
"Another Song"	2020	Lewis Watson	The Love That You Want	Both	check	
"Dizzy" (featuring Thomas Headon and Alfie Templeman)	2021	Chloe Moriondo	Non-album single	Both	check	
"I Wish I Wasn't Me"	2023	Eric Nam	House on a Hill	Both	check	check
"Never Ever Love a Liar"	2023	Bea and her Business	Introverted Extrovert	Anthony Vander West	check	check
"Never Ever Love a Liar"	2023	Bea and her Business	Introverted Extrovert	Josephine Vander West	check	
"If I Was a God"	2023	Bea and her Business	Introverted Extrovert	Anthony Vander West	check	check
"If I Was a God"	2023	Bea and her Business	Introverted Extrovert	Josephine Vander West	check	
"Born to Be Alive"	2023	Bea and her Business	Introverted Extrovert	Anthony Vander West	check	check
"Born to Be Alive"	2023	Bea and her Business	Introverted Extrovert	Josephine Vander West	check	
"Good Things"	2024	Bea and her Business	Non-album single	Anthony Vander West	check	check
"Good Things"	2024	Bea and her Business	Non-album single	Josephine Vander West	check	
