= Ultralife =

Studio album by Oh Wonder
- Released: 14 July 2017
- Recorded: 2016–2017
- Genres: Indie pop; electropop; alternative
- Length: 44:04
- Labels: Island; Republic
- Producer: Oh Wonder

Oh Wonder chronology
Oh Wonder (2015)	Ultralife (2017)	No One Else Can Wear Your Crown (2020)

Ultralife is the second album by alt-pop duo Oh Wonder, released on 14 July 2017.

== Background ==
Anthony West and Josephine Vander Gucht of Oh Wonder began the writing process with a month in an Airbnb in Brooklyn, New York in April 2016. Later in the year, they returned to their hometown of London after a year of touring the world, and wrote the second half of the record. The twelve songs were recorded over a 10-day period at The Pool Studio, Bermondsey in December 2016 and finished at their home studio at the start of 2017. The duo wrote, recorded, produced and mixed the record themselves. The first single "Ultralife" was released on 31 March 2017 and hailed by the NME as "bright-eyed" and "dazzling".

== Critical reception ==
Professional ratings
Aggregate scores
Source	Rating
Metacritic	61/100
Review scores
Source	Rating
Never Enough Notes	4.5/5 stars
Press Play OK	4/5 stars
Rolling Stone	4/5 stars
Irish Times	4/5 stars
Evening Standard	4/5 stars
Daily Telegraph	4/5 stars
AllMusic	2.5/5 stars

Ultralife received positive reviews from critics. Larisha Paul of Baeble Music called the album an "ethereal adventure" that showcases the duo's "masterful songwriting abilities". In contrast, AllMusic's Marcy Donelson said that, compared to their 2015 debut album, "intimacy definitely takes a hit with Ultralife's expanded production".

== Track listing ==
All tracks are written by Josephine Vander Gucht and Anthony West.

No.	Title	Length
1.	"Solo"	3:24
2.	"Ultralife"	3:31
3.	"Lifetimes"	3:52
4.	"High on Humans"	3:11
5.	"All About You"	3:02
6.	"Heavy"	3:11
7.	"Bigger Than Love"	3:39
8.	"Heart Strings"	3:24
9.	"Slip Away"	3:41
10.	"Overgrown"	3:58
11.	"My Friends"	4:55
12.	"Waste"	4:16
Total length:		44:04

== Charts ==
Chart (2017)	Peak position
Australian Albums (ARIA)	37
Belgian Albums (Ultratop Flanders)	28
Belgian Albums (Ultratop Wallonia)	115
Canadian Albums (Billboard)	17
Dutch Albums (Album Top 100)	48
Irish Albums (IRMA)	38
New Zealand Heatseekers Albums (RMNZ)	5
Scottish Albums (Official Charts)	13
Swiss Albums (Schweizer Hitparade)	62
UK Albums (Official Charts)	8
US Billboard 200	76
US Top Alternative Albums (Billboard)	11
US Top Rock Albums (Billboard)	14
