= The 50 Greatest Hits =

Greatest hits album by Elvis Presley
- Released: November 18, 2000
- Recorded: July 5, 1954 – October 29, 1976
- Genre: Rock and roll
- Length: 128:27
- Labels: BMG, RCA

Elvis Presley chronology
The Elvis Presley Collection – Country (2000)	The 50 Greatest Hits (2000)	White Christmas (2000)

The 50 Greatest Hits is a compilation album by American singer Elvis Presley, originally released on November 18, 2000. It features 50 of Presley's best known songs and was re-released on 11 August 2017 to commemorate 40 years since his death.

== Track listing ==
The 50 Greatest Hits – disc 1
No.	Title	Writer(s)	Length
1.	"That's All Right"	Arthur "Big Boy" Crudup	1:58
2.	"Mystery Train"	Junior Parker, Sam Phillips	2:27
3.	"Heartbreak Hotel"	Mae Boren Axton, Tommy Durden, Elvis Presley	2:10
4.	"Blue Suede Shoes"	Carl Perkins	2:02
5.	"Lawdy, Miss Clawdy"	Lloyd Price	2:10
6.	"Hound Dog"	Jerry Leiber and Mike Stoller	2:18
7.	"Don't Be Cruel"	Otis Blackwell, Elvis Presley	2:05
8.	"Love Me Tender"	Vera Matson, Elvis Presley	2:44
9.	"Too Much"	Lee Rosenberg, Bernard Weinman	2:35
10.	"All Shook Up"	Otis Blackwell, Elvis Presley	1:59
11.	"(Let Me Be Your) Teddy Bear"	Bernie Lowe, Kal Mann	1:49
12.	"Party"	Jessie Mae Robinson	1:32
13.	"Loving You"	Jerry Leiber and Mike Stoller	2:16
14.	"Jailhouse Rock"	Jerry Leiber and Mike Stoller	2:29
15.	"Don't"	Jerry Leiber and Mike Stoller	2:51
16.	"Trouble"	Jerry Leiber and Mike Stoller	2:19
17.	"Wear My Ring Around Your Neck"	Bert Carroll, Moody Russell	2:16
18.	"King Creole"	Jerry Leiber and Mike Stoller	2:10
19.	"Hard Headed Woman"	Claude Demetrius	1:56
20.	"One Night"	Dave Bartholomew, Pearl King, Anita Steiman	2:34
21.	"A Fool Such as I"	Bill Trader	2:40
22.	"A Big Hunk o' Love"	Aaron Schroeder, Sidney Wyche	2:15
23.	"Stuck on You"	J. Leslie McFarland, Aaron Schroeder	2:22
24.	"The Girl of My Best Friend"	Sam Bobrick, Ross Butler	2:25
25.	"It's Now or Never"	Eduardo DeCapua, Wally Gold, Aaron Schroeder	3:15
Total length:			57:03

The 50 Greatest Hits – disc 2
No.	Title	Writer(s)	Length
1.	"Are You Lonesome Tonight"	Lou Handman, Roy Turk	3:09
2.	"Wooden Heart"	Bert Kaempfert, Kay Twomey, Ben Weisman, Fred Wise	2:06
3.	"Surrender"	Doc Pomus, Mort Shuman	1:56
4.	"(Marie's the Name) His Latest Flame"	Doc Pomus, Mort Shuman	2:10
5.	"Can't Help Falling in Love"	Luigi Creatore, Hugo Peretti, George David Weiss	3:05
6.	"Good Luck Charm"	Wally Gold, Aaron Schroeder	2:27
7.	"She's Not You"	Jerry Leiber, Doc Pomus, Mike Stoller	2:11
8.	"Return to Sender"	Otis Blackwell, Winfield Scott	2:09
9.	"(You're the) Devil in Disguise"	Bernie Baum, Buddy Kaye	2:23
10.	"Viva Las Vegas"	Doc Pomus, Mort Shuman	2:27
11.	"Crying in the Chapel"	Artie Glenn	2:28
12.	"Love Letters"	Edward Heyman, Victor Young	2:53
13.	"Guitar Man"	Jerry Reed	2:22
14.	"If I Can Dream"	W. Earl Brown	3:12
15.	"In the Ghetto"	Mac Davis	2:49
16.	"Suspicious Minds"	Mark James	4:23
17.	"Don't Cry Daddy"	Scott Davis	2:50
18.	"The Wonder of You"	Baker Knight	2:37
19.	"I Just Can't Help Believin'"	Barry Mann, Cynthia Weil	4:38
20.	"An American Trilogy"	Mickey Newbury	4:30
21.	"Burning Love"	Dennis Linde	2:52
22.	"Always on My Mind"	Johnny Christopher, Mark James, Wayne Carson	3:40
23.	"Suspicion"	Doc Pomus, Mort Shuman	2:38
24.	"Moody Blue"	Mark James	2:52
25.	"Way Down"	Layng Martine, Jr.	2:37
Total length:			71:24

== Charts ==
=== Weekly charts ===
Chart (2000–2017)	Peak position
Australian Albums (ARIA)	7
Austrian Albums (Ö3 Austria)	3
Dutch Albums (Album Top 100)	94
Irish Albums (IRMA)	8
New Zealand Albums (RMNZ)	1
Norwegian Albums (VG-lista)	4
Scottish Albums (Official Charts)	1
Swiss Albums (Schweizer Hitparade)	49
UK Albums (Official Charts)	2

=== Year-end charts ===
Chart (2000)	Position
UK Albums (OCC)	31
Chart (2001)	Position
Austrian Albums (Ö3 Austria)	36
UK Albums (OCC)	106
Chart (2020)	Position
UK Albums (OCC)	71
Chart (2021)	Position
UK Albums (OCC)	68

== Certifications ==
Region	Certification	Certified units/sales
Australia (ARIA)	Gold	35,000^{‡}
Austria (IFPI Austria)	Gold	25,000^{*}
New Zealand (RMNZ)	Platinum	15,000^{^}
Norway (IFPI Norway)	Platinum	50,000^{*}
United Kingdom (BPI)	3× Platinum	900,000^{‡}
^{*} Sales figures based on certification alone.^{^} Shipments figures based on certification alone.^{‡} Sales+streaming figures based on certification alone.
