= Elvis Presley albums discography =

Recording collections by American singer

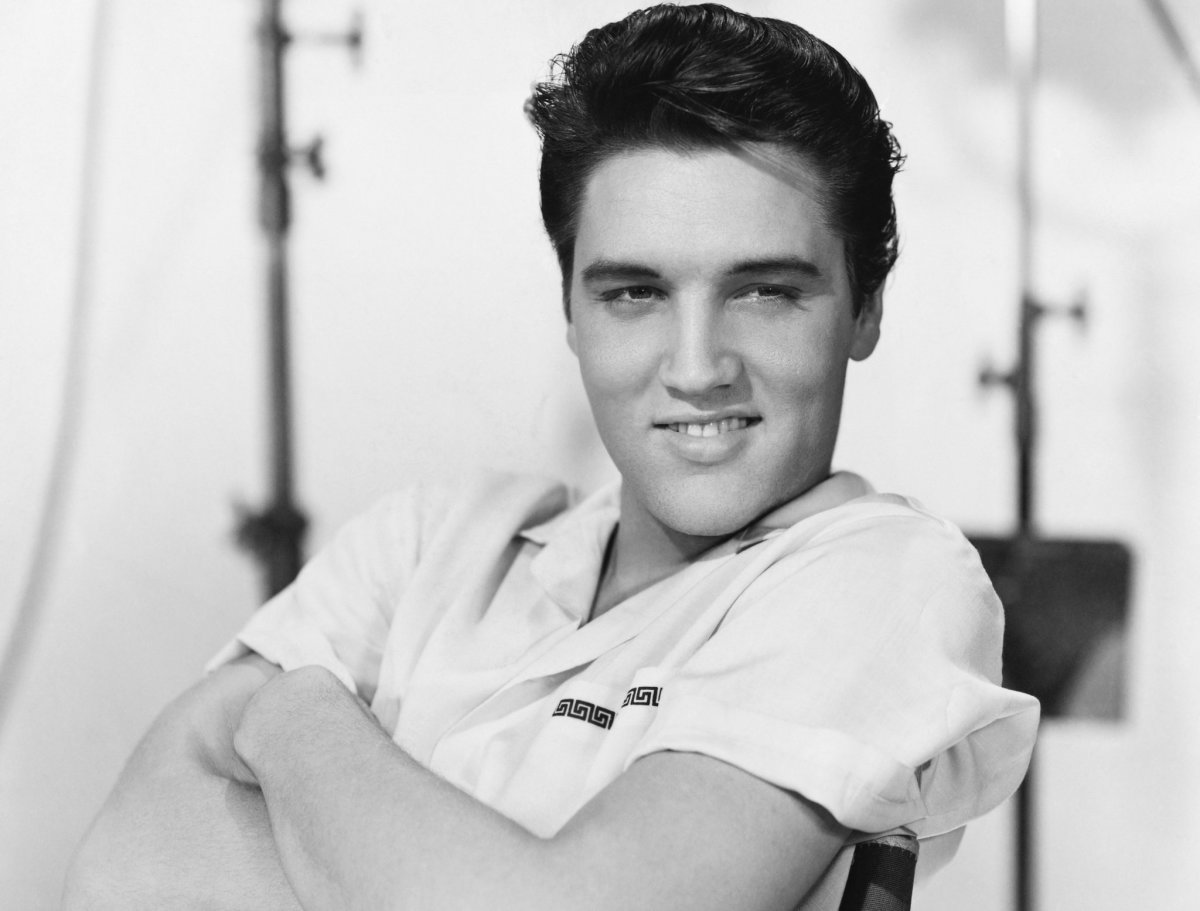
- Presley in 1958
- Studio albums: 24
- Extended plays: 38
- Soundtrack albums: 17
- Live albums: 8
- Compilation albums: 21
- Spoken word albums: 1
- Budget albums: 19
- Box sets: 82
- Posthumous compilations: 342
- Remix albums: 24
- Follow That Dream albums/EPs: 277

The albums discography of Elvis Presley began in 1956 with the release of his debut album, Elvis Presley.

He is one of the best selling artists of all time, selling up to 500 million records globally. Despite the absence of his many hits during his peak years prior to October 1958 (as well as all of his top-selling albums prior to 1992), Billboard still ranks Presley as 13th on their Greatest of All Time artists list and 4th on their Greatest of All Time Hot 100 list. Music historian Joel Whitburn ranked Presley as the No. 1 charting single and album artist of all time in the US (both Billboard and Cashbox). Elvis' Christmas Album remains the biggest selling holiday album of all time, selling over 20 million copies worldwide. According to the Recording Industry Association of America (RIAA), Presley has sold 146.5 million certified albums in the US, making him the third top-selling album artist in the country. He also holds the record for most RIAA certified albums with 101 (44 Gold, 32 Platinum, 24 Multi-Platinum, and 1 Diamond) and certifications (207). As for extended play albums, he has a record 16 certified by the RIAA (6 Gold, 8 Platinum, and 2 Multi-Platinum) and 28 certifications.

== Albums ==
=== Studio albums ===
Title	Album details	Peak chart positions																Certifications
Title	Album details	US	US Cou.	AUS	AUT	BEL (FLA)	CAN	FIN	FRA	GER	JPN	NL	NZ	NOR	SWE	SWI	UK	Certifications
Elvis Presley	Released: March 23, 1956; Label: RCA Victor	1	—N/a	—N/a	—N/a	—	—	—N/a	—	—	23 (Note: The April 1970 rerelease)	—N/a	—	20 (Note: The 1977 rerelease)	—	—	1	RIAA: Platinum; BPI: Silver
Elvis	Released: October 19, 1956; Label: RCA Victor	1	—N/a	—N/a	—N/a	—	—	—N/a	—	31 (Note: The 1965 rerelease)	—	—N/a	—	—	—	—	3	RIAA: Platinum; BPI: Silver
Elvis' Christmas Album	Released: November, 1957; Label: RCA Victor	1 (Note: Re-entered the Top 40 (64 years after its last appearance) in 2024 at #28; it also reached #3 on the Top Rock Albums chart the same year)	—N/a (Note: 1. 7 in 2024)	—N/a	—N/a (Note: 1. 41 in 2023)	96 (Note: 2022)	—	—N/a (Note: The 2020 rerelease)	—	60 (Note: The April 1970 rerelease)	—	—N/a (Note: 1. 9 in 2020)		27 (Note: The 2017 rerelease)	12 (Note: The 2020 rerelease)	14 (Note: The 2022 rerelease)	2	RIAA: 3× Platinum; BPI: Silver; MC: Platinum
Elvis Is Back!	Released: April 8, 1960; Label: RCA Victor	2 (Note: 1. 199 in 2011)	—N/a	—N/a	—N/a	—	1	—N/a	—	—	—	—N/a	—	—	—	—	1	RIAA: Gold
His Hand in Mine	Released: November 10, 1960; Label: RCA Victor	13	—N/a (Note: 1. 7 in 1977)	—N/a	—N/a	—	—	—N/a	—	—	—	—N/a	—	—	—	—	3	RIAA: Platinum
Something for Everybody	Released: May 19, 1961; Label: RCA Victor	1	—N/a	—N/a	—N/a	—	—	—N/a	—	—	—	—N/a	—	—	—	—	2	RIAA: Gold
Pot Luck	Released: June 5, 1962; Label: RCA Victor	4	—N/a	—N/a	—N/a	—	6	—N/a	7	—	—N/a	—	—	—	—	1		
Elvis for Everyone!	Released: August 10, 1965; Label: RCA Victor	10	—	—N/a	—N/a	—	—	—N/a	—	—	—	—N/a	—	—	—	—	8	
How Great Thou Art	Released: February 27, 1967; Label: RCA Victor	18	— (Note: 1. 7 in 1977)	—N/a	—N/a	—	—	—N/a	—	—	—	—N/a	—	20	—	—	11	RIAA: 3× Platinum
From Elvis in Memphis	Released: June 2, 1969; Label: RCA Victor	13	2	—N/a	—N/a	77 (Note: 2009)	10	—N/a	—	14	—	10	—	1	—	—	1	RIAA: Gold
Elvis Back in Memphis (see below in the Live albums section for the original double album)	Released: November 1970; Label: RCA Victor	183	—	—	—N/a	—	—	—N/a	—	—	—	—	—	—	—	—	—	
Elvis - That's the Way It Is	Released: November 11, 1970; Label: RCA Victor	21	8	13	—N/a	90 (Note: 2014)	22	—N/a	—	—	1	—	—	18	—	—	12	RIAA: Platinum; BPI: Gold
Elvis Country (I'm 10,000 Years Old)	Released: January 7, 1971; Label: RCA Victor; aka "I Really Don't Want to Know" in Japan	12	6	15	—N/a	—	15	—N/a	—	—	35	—	—	—	—	—	6	RIAA: Gold
Love Letters from Elvis	Released: June 16, 1971; Label: RCA Victor	33	12	—	—N/a	—	17	—N/a	—	—	37	—	—	—	—	—	7	
Elvis Sings The Wonderful World of Christmas	Released: October 20, 1971; Label: RCA Victor	(Note: "Wonderful World of Christmas" reached number 1 on the Billboard Christmas Albums chart in 1972 and 1973.)	— (Note: "Wonderful World of Christmas" reached number 13 on the Billboard Country Albums chart in 1978.)	—	—N/a	—	—N/a	—	—	—	—	20 (Note: released as "A Merry Christmas from Elvis Presley" in 1982)	—	—	—	14 (Note: 2022 rerelease)	—	RIAA: 3× Platinum
Elvis Now	Released: February 1972; Label: RCA Victor	43	45	43	—N/a	—	29	—N/a	—	—	—	—	—	—	—	—	12	RIAA: Gold
He Touched Me	Released: April 1972; Label: RCA Victor	79	32	—	—N/a	—	—	—N/a	—	—	—	—	—	—	—	—	38	RIAA: Platinum
Elvis (The "Fool" Album)	Released: July 1973; Label: RCA Victor	52	8	24	—	—	76	—N/a	—	—	—	—	—	—	—	—	16	
Raised on Rock / For Ol' Times Sake	Released: October 1, 1973; Label: RCA Victor	50	—	61	—	—	48	—N/a	—	—	—	—	—	—	—	—	—	
Good Times	Released: March 20, 1974; Label: RCA Victor	90	5 (Note: "Good Times" reached number 1 on the Cash Box Country Albums chart.)	89	—	—	—	—N/a	—	—	—	—	—	—	—	—	42	
Promised Land	Released: January 8, 1975; Label: RCA Victor	47	1	—	—	—	84	—N/a	—	—	71	—	—	—	—	—	21	
Today	Released: May 7, 1975; Label: RCA Victor	57	4	46	—	—	—	—N/a	—	—	—	—	—	11	—	—	48	BPI: Silver
From Elvis Presley Boulevard, Memphis, Tennessee	Released: May 1976; Label: RCA Victor	41	1	—	—	—	50	—N/a	—	—	—	—	—	—	34	—	29	RIAA: Gold
Moody Blue	Released: June 1977; Label: RCA Victor	3	1	3	20	—	2	—N/a	—	19	25	3	1	3	2	—	3	RIAA: 2× Platinum; BPI: Silver; SNEP: Gold; MC: 2× Platinum
"—" denotes items which were not released in that country or failed to chart.

=== Soundtrack albums ===
Title	Album details	Peak chart positions									Certifications
Title	Album details	US	AUS	CAN	FRA	GER	JPN	NZ	SWE	UK	Certifications
Loving You (Note: Side one of "Loving You" consists of studio recordings for the soundtrack to the movie of the same name, while side two includes other studio recordings that were not featured in the movie.)	Released: July, 1957; Label: RCA Victor	1	—N/a	—	—	—	—	—	—	1	RIAA: Gold
King Creole	Released: August, 1958; Label: RCA Victor	2	—N/a	—	—	—	—	—	—	1	RIAA: Gold
G.I. Blues	Released: October, 1960; Label: RCA Victor	1	—N/a (Note: 1. 71 in 1977)	—	—	—	—	—	—	1 (Note: 1. 70 in 1980)	RIAA: Platinum; BPI: Silver
Blue Hawaii	Released: October 20, 1961; Label: RCA Victor	1	—N/a (Note: 1. 63 in 1977)	—	—	17	51 (Note: The June 1971 rerelease)	39 (Note: The 1977 rerelease)	46 (Note: The 1977 rerelease)	1	RIAA: 3× Platinum; MC: Gold
Girls! Girls! Girls!	Released: November 9, 1962; Label: RCA Victor	3	—N/a	—	—	18	—	—	—	2	RIAA: Gold
It Happened at the World's Fair	Released: April 10, 1963; Label: RCA Victor	4 (Note: It had dropped to #32 on the new Billboard Top LP's chart on 8/17/1963)	—N/a	—	—	19	—	—	—	4	
Fun in Acapulco	Released: November 15, 1963; Label: RCA Victor	3	—N/a	—	10	21	—	—	—	9	
Kissin' Cousins	Released: April 2, 1964; Label: RCA Victor	6	—N/a	1	—	22	—	—	—	5	
Roustabout	Released: October 20, 1964; Label: RCA Victor	1	—N/a	1	—	—	—	—	—	12	RIAA: Gold
Girl Happy	Released: March 2, 1965; Label: RCA Victor	8	—N/a	—	—	—	—	—	—	8	RIAA: Gold
Harum Scarum	Released: November 3, 1965; Label: RCA Victor	8	—N/a	—	—	—	—	—	—	11	
Frankie and Johnny (Note: The Pickwick budget album version was awarded Platinum by the RIAA in 2004)	Released: March, 1966; Label: RCA Victor	20	—	—	—	—	—	—	—	11	
Paradise, Hawaiian Style	Released: June 10, 1966; Label: RCA Victor	15	—	—	—	—	—	—	—	7 (Note: 1. 53 in 1980)	
Spinout	Released: October 31, 1966; Label: RCA Victor	18	—	—	—	—	—	—	—	17	
Double Trouble	Released: June 1, 1967; Label: RCA Victor	47	—	—	—	—	—	—	—	34	
Clambake	Released: October 10, 1967; Label: RCA Victor	40	—	—	—	—	—	—	—	39	
Speedway	Released: May 1, 1968; Label: RCA Victor	82	—	—	—	—	—	—	—	—	
"—" denotes items which were not released in that country or failed to chart.

=== Live albums ===
Title	Album details	Peak chart positions													Certifications
Title	Album details	US	US Cou.	AUS	AUT	BEL (FLA)	CAN	GER	JPN	NL	NZ	NOR	SWE	UK	Certifications
Elvis (NBC TV Special)	Released: December, 1968; Label: RCA Victor	8	—	—N/a	—N/a	—	4	72 (Note: The 2004 rerelease)	—	—N/a	—	18	—	2	RIAA: Platinum
Elvis in Person at the International Hotel Las Vegas, Nevada / Elvis Back in Memphis (From Memphis to Vegas / From Vegas to Memphis)	Released: November, 1969; Label: RCA Victor; second half are studio recordings	12	5	7	—N/a	—	5	37	—	—	—	20	—	3	RIAA: Gold
On Stage (February, 1970)	Released: June 1970; Label: RCA Victor	13	13	16	—N/a	—	6	—	5	—	—	5	—	2	RIAA: Platinum
Elvis In Person at The International Hotel Las Vegas, Nevada	Released: November 1970; Label: RCA Victor	—	—	—	—N/a	—	—	—	9	—	—	—	—	—	RIAA: Platinum
Elvis: As Recorded at Madison Square Garden	Released: June 1972; Label: RCA Victor	11	22	18	—N/a	—	9	—	4 (Note: It also went to #6 that same year as "Elvis on Tour")	—	—	19	—	3	RIAA: 3× Platinum
Aloha from Hawaii via Satellite	Released: February 1, 1973; Label: RCA Victor	1	1	9	—	48 (Note: The 2023 rerelease)	1	38	1	49 (Note: The 1978 rerelease)	—	7	—	11	RIAA: 5× Platinum; BPI: Silver; MC: 2× Platinum
Elvis Recorded Live on Stage in Memphis	Released: July 1974; Label: RCA Victor	33	2 (Note: "Elvis Recorded Live on Stage in Memphis" reached number 1 on the Cash Box Country Albums chart.)	92	72 (Note: The 2014 rerelease)	—	27	—	47	—	—	—	—	44	RIAA: Gold
Elvis in Concert	Released: October 3, 1977; Label: RCA Victor	5	1	17	—	—	4	—	68	12	6	12	12	13	RIAA: 3× Platinum; MC: 2× Platinum
"—" denotes items which were not released in that country or failed to chart.

=== Spoken word albums ===
Title	Album details	Peak chart positions	
Title	Album details	US	US Country
Having Fun with Elvis on Stage	Released: October 1974; Label: RCA Victor	130	9

=== Compilation albums ===
Title	Album details	Peak chart positions												Certifications
Title	Album details	US	US Cou.	AUS	AUT	CAN	FRA	GER	JPN	NL	NZ	SWE	UK	Certifications
Elvis' Golden Records	Released: March 21, 1958; Label: RCA Victor	3 (Note: 1. 63 in 1977)	—N/a (Note: Elvis' Golden Records did not chart until (at #50) November 2023, at least partially because Billboard's Country Albums chart was not created until around 1963-64.)	—N/a (Note: 1. 79 in 1977)	—N/a	—	—	—	—	—N/a (Note: 1. 142 in 2017)	—	—	2	RIAA: 6× Platinum; BPI: Silver; MC: Platinum
For LP Fans Only	Released: February 6, 1959; Label: RCA Victor	19	—N/a	—N/a	—N/a	—	—	—	—	—N/a	—	—	—	
A Date with Elvis	Released: August, 1959; Label: RCA Victor	32	—N/a	—N/a	—N/a	—	—	—	—	—N/a	—	—	4	
Elvis' Gold Records, Volume 2 (50,000,000 Elvis Fans Can't Be Wrong)	Released: December, 1959; Label: RCA Victor	31	—N/a	—N/a	—N/a	1	—	—	—	—N/a	—	—	4	RIAA: Platinum
Elvis' Golden Records Volume 3	Released: August 12, 1963; Label: RCA Victor	3	—N/a	—N/a	—N/a	79	14	—	—	—N/a	—	—	6	RIAA: Platinum; SNEP: Gold
Elvis' Gold Records Volume 4	Released: January 2, 1968; Label: RCA Victor	33	—	—N/a	—N/a	—	—	—	—	—N/a	—	—	—	RIAA: Gold
Presley Golden Hymn	Released: April 1970 (Japan); Label: RCA; combination of His Hand in Mine and How Great Thou Art	—	—	—	—N/a	—	—	—	73	—	—	—	—	
Elvis	Released: August 2, 1973; Label: RCA Special Products/Brookville Records	—	—	—	—	—	—	—	—	—	—	—	—	RIAA: 5× Platinum
Elvis - Rock 'n' On (24 Legendary Hits)	Released: 1973 (Australasia); Label: RCA Victor	—	—	—	—	—	—	—	—	—	4	—	—	
Elvis: A Legendary Performer Volume 1	Released: November, 1973; Label: RCA	41	1	34	—	48	—	—	81	—	25	—	20	RIAA: 3× Platinum
Elvis - Rock 'n' On Volume 2 (25 All-Time Rock 'n' Roll Hits	Released: 1973 (Australasia); Label: RCA Victor	—	—	— (Note: 1. 8 in 1975)	—	—	—	—	—	—	3	—	—	
Elvis Gold 30	Released: 1973 (Japan); Label: RCA	—	—	—	—	—	—	—	62	—	—	—	—	
Elvis' 40 Greatest	Released: October 1974 (UK); Released: 1975 (Germany, Netherlands); Label: RCA Victor	—	—	—	1	—	—	4	—	10	—	—	3 (Note: The 1978 rerelease went to #40)	BPI: Platinum
Elvis in the '70s	Released: 1975 (Australasia); Label: RCA Victor	—	—	22	—	—	—	—	—	—	9	—	—	
Elvis: A Legendary Performer Volume 2	Released: January 8, 1976; Label: RCA	46	9	89 (Note: 1. 87 in 1977)	—	35	—	—	—	—	—	—	—	RIAA: 2× Platinum
Elvis in Hollywood	Released: January 7, 1976; Label: RCA Victor	—	—	— (Note: 1. 7 in 1978)	—	—	—	—	—	—	4	—	—	RIAA: Platinum; Recorded Music NZ: Platinum
The Sun Sessions	Released: March 22, 1976; Label: RCA Victor	76	2 (Note: "The Sun Sessions" reached number 1 on the Cash Box Country Albums chart.)	—	—	—	—	—	—	—	—	—	16	
Blue Christmas	Released: 1976 (non-US); Label: RCA Victor	—	—	—	—	—	93	—	—	—	—	12	—	MC: 3× Platinum
Special 24	Released: 1976 (Japan); Label: RCA	—	—	—	—	—	—	—	18	—	—	—	—	
Rock 'n' Roll Album	Released: (Japan); Label: RCA	—	—	—	—	—	—	—	28	—	—	—	—	
Welcome to My World	Released: March 1977; Label: RCA Victor	44	4	58	—	26	—	—	—	—	20	—	7	RIAA: Platinum
"—" denotes items which were not released in that country or failed to chart.

=== Budget albums ===
Title	Album details	Peak chart positions											Certifications
Title	Album details	US	US Cou.	AUT	CAN	GER	JPN	NL	NOR	SWE	SWI	UK	Certifications
Elvis Sings Flaming Star	Released: October 1, 1968; Label: RCA Camden	96	—	—N/a	—	—	—	1	11	—	—	2	RIAA: Platinum
Let's Be Friends	Released: April 1970; Label: RCA Camden	105	—	—N/a	—	—	—	—	15	—	—	—	RIAA: Platinum
Almost in Love	Released: October 1970; Label: RCA Camden	65	—	—N/a	46	—	—	—	—	—	—	38	RIAA: Platinum
Elvis' Christmas Album	Released: November 1970; Label: RCA Camden	—	—	—N/a	—	—	—	—	—	—	—	7	RIAA: Diamond (10× Platinum); BPI: Gold
You'll Never Walk Alone	Released: March 22, 1971; Label: RCA Camden	69	—	—N/a	47	—	—	—	—	—	—	20	RIAA: 3× Platinum
C'mon Everybody	Released: July 1971; Label: RCA Camden	70	—	—N/a	70	—	—	—	—	—	—	5	RIAA: Gold; SNEP: Platinum
I Got Lucky	Released: October 1971; Label: RCA Camden	104	—	—N/a	—	—	—	—	—	—	—	26	RIAA: Platinum; BPI: Gold
Elvis Sings Hits from His Movies, Volume 1	Released: June 1972; Label: RCA Camden	87	—	—N/a	—	—	—	—	—	—	—	—	RIAA: Platinum
Burning Love and Hits from His Movies, Volume 2	Released: October 1972; Label: RCA Camden	22	10	—N/a	—	—	28	—	—	—	—	—	RIAA: 2× Platinum
Separate Ways	Released: December 1, 1972; Label: RCA Camden	46	12	—N/a	—	—	—	—	—	—	—	—	RIAA: Platinum; BPI: Gold
A Portrait in Music	Released: 1970 (Germany); Released: 1972 (Netherlands); Label: RCA International	—	—	—N/a (Note: The 1977 rerelease went to #19)	—	9 (Note: The 1977 rerelease)	—	—	—	—	—	—	NVPI: Platinum
Elvis Forever (32 Hits and the Story of a King)	Released: 1974 (non-US); Label: RCA International	—	—	4	—	2	—	2 (Note: in 1991, a 30-track version went to #38)	—	7 (Note: 1977 rerelease)	12	—	BVMI: Platinum; SNEP: Platinum; NVPI: Platinum
Solid Rocks	Released: 1975; Label: RCA International (France)	—	—	—	—	—	—	—	—	—	—	—	SNEP: Gold
Easy Come, Easy Go	Released: February 1, 1975 (UK); Label: RCA Camden	—	—	—	—	—	—	—	—	—	—	—	BPI: Gold
Pure Gold	Released: March 1975; Label: RCA	—	5	—	—	—	—	—	—	—	—	—	RIAA: 2× Platinum; MC: Gold
The U.S. Male	Released: June 1, 1975 (UK); Label: RCA Camden	—	—	—	—	—	—	—	—	—	—	—	BPI: Gold
Double Dynamite	Released: December 1975; Label: Pickwick	—	—	—	—	—	—	—	—	—	—	—	RIAA: Platinum
Frankie & Johnny	Released: 1975; Label: Pickwick	—	—	—	—	—	—	—	—	—	—	—	RIAA: Platinum
The Elvis Presley Collection	Released: August 1, 1976 (UK); Label: RCA Camden	—	—	—	—	—	—	—	—	—	—	—	BPI: Gold
"—" denotes items which were not released in that country or failed to chart.

=== Extended plays ===
Title	Album details	Peak chart positions						Certifications
Title	Album details	US EP	US Hot	US 200	AUS	UK EP	UK Singles	Certifications
Elvis Presley (single EP - EPA 747)	Released: March, 1956; Label: RCA Victor	10	24	—	—	—	—	RIAA: Gold
Elvis Presley (double EP- EPB 1254)	Released: March 23, 1956; Label: RCA Victor	9	—	—	—	—	—	
Heartbreak Hotel	Released: May, 1956; Label: RCA Victor	5	76	—	—	—	—	RIAA: Gold
Elvis Presley	Released: September, 1956; Label: RCA Victor	—	55	—	—	—	—	RIAA: Gold
The Real Elvis	Released: October, 1956; Label: RCA Victor	5	—	—	—	—	—	RIAA: Platinum; BPI: Silver
Any Way You Want Me	Released: October, 1956; Label: RCA Victor	—	74	—	—	—	—	
Elvis Vol. 1	Released: October 19, 1956; Label: RCA Victor	1	6	—	—	—	—	RIAA: 2× Platinum
Love Me Tender	Released: November 1, 1956; Label: RCA Victor	9	35	22	27	—	—	RIAA: Platinum
Elvis Vol. 2	Released: December, 1956; Label: RCA Victor	—	47	—	—	—	—	RIAA: Gold
Strictly Elvis	Released: January 25, 1957; Label: RCA Victor	—	—	—	—	—	—	
Peace in the Valley	Released: April 11, 1957; Label: RCA Victor	3	39	3	—	12 (Note: 1961)	—	RIAA: Platinum
Just for You	Released: August 21, 1957; Label: RCA Victor	2	—	16	—	—	—	
Loving You, Vol. I	Released: August, 1957; Label: RCA Victor	1	—	—	—	—	—	RIAA: Gold
Loving You, Vol. II	Released: August, 1957; Label: RCA Victor	4	—	18	—	—	—	RIAA: Platinum
Jailhouse Rock	Released: October 30, 1957; Label: RCA Victor	1	—	—	—	14	18 (Note: 1961)	RIAA: 2× Platinum
Good Rockin' Tonight	Released: September, 1957 (UK); Label: RCA Victor	—	—	—	—	—	—	
Old Shep	Released: November 1957; Label: RCA Victor; Australia-only release	—	—	—	25	—	—	
Elvis Sings Christmas Songs	Released: December, 1957; Label: RCA Victor	1	—	—	—	16 (Note: 1960)	—	RIAA: Platinum
King Creole Vol. 1	Released: September, 1958; Label: RCA Victor	1	—	—	51	—	—	RIAA: Platinum
King Creole Vol. 2	Released: September, 1958; Label: RCA Victor	1	—	—	—	—	—	RIAA: Platinum
Elvis Sails	Released: December, 1958; Label: RCA Victor	1	—	—	—	—	—	
Christmas with Elvis	Released: December, 1958; Label: RCA Victor	—	—	—	—	—	—	
Elvis in Tender Mood	Released: February, 1959 (UK); Label: RCA Victor	—	—	—	—	—	—	
A Touch of Gold Vol. 1	Released: April 21, 1959; Label: RCA Victor	—	—	—	—	8	—	
A Touch of Gold Vol. 2	Released: October, 1959; Label: RCA Victor	—	—	—	—	10	—	
Strictly Elvis	Released: December, 1959 (UK); Label: RCA Victor	—	—	—	—	1	26 (Note: 1960)	
A Touch of Gold Vol. 3	Released: February 1960; Label: RCA Victor	—	—	—	—	—	—	
Such a Night	Released: November, 1960 (UK); Label: RCA Victor	—	—	—	—	4	—	
It's Now or Never	Released: 1960 (France); Label: RCA Victor	—	—	—	—	—	—	SNEP: Gold
Elvis by Request: Flaming Star and 3 Other Great Songs	Released: February, 1961; Label: RCA Victor	—	14	—	4	—	—	
Follow That Dream	Released: April 1962; Label: RCA Victor	—	15	—	11	1	34	RIAA: Platinum
Kid Galahad	Released: August 28, 1962; Label: RCA Victor	—	30	—	24	1	23	RIAA: Gold
Viva Las Vegas	Released: May 1964; Label: RCA Victor	—	92	—	29	3	—	
Elvis for You Vol. 1	Released: May, 1964 (UK); Label: RCA Victor	—	—	—	—	11	—	
Elvis for You Vol. 2	Released: May, 1964 (UK); Label: RCA Victor	—	—	—	—	18	—	
Tickle Me	Released: June 15, 1965; Label: RCA Victor	—	70	—	42	3	—	
Tickle Me Vol. 2	Released: August, 1965 (UK); Label: RCA Victor	—	—	—	—	8	—	
Easy Come, Easy Go	Released: March 1, 1967; Label: RCA Victor	—	—	—	78	1	—	BPI: Gold
"—" denotes items which were not released in that country or failed to chart.

=== Box set albums ===
Title	Album details	Peak chart positions															Certifications	
Title	Album details	US	US Cou.	AUS	AUT	BEL (FLA)	CAN	DEN	FRA	GER	JPN	NL	NZ	NOR	SWE	SWI	Certifications	UK
Worldwide 50 Gold Award Hits Vol. 1	Released: August 1970; Label: RCA	45	25	—	—N/a	—	33	—	—N/a	72 (Note: The 2022 rerelease)	—	—	—	—	—	—	—	RIAA: 2× Platinum
The Other Sides – Elvis Worldwide Gold Award Hits Vol. 2	Released: August 1971; Label: RCA	120	—	—	—N/a	—	—	—	—N/a	—	—	—	—	—	—	—	—	RIAA: Gold
Worldwide Gold Award Hits, Parts 1 & 2	Released: 1974; Label: RCA; The first half of the earlier Worldwide 50 Gold Award Hits Vol. 1	—	—	—	—	—	—	—	—N/a	—	—	—	—	—	—	—	—	RIAA: Platinum
The Elvis Presley Story	Released: August 1977; Label: RCA Special Products, Candlelight Music	—	—	—	—	—	—	—	—N/a	—	—	—	—	—	—	—	—	RIAA: 2× Platinum
20 Golden Hits In Full Color Sleeves	Released: 1977; Label: RCA; non-album box set (45 RPM records)	—	—	—	—	—	—	—	—N/a	—	—	—	—	—	—	—	—	
15 Golden Records 30 Golden Hits	Released: 1977; Label: RCA; non-album box set (45 RPM records)	—	—	—	—	—	—	—	—N/a	—	—	—	—	—	—	—	—	
100 Super Rocks	Released: 1977 (Germany); Released: November 1978 (Australia); Label: RCA Victor	—	—	59	—	—	—	—	—N/a	25	—	—	6	—	—	—	—	
Worldwide Gold Award Hits, Parts 3 & 4	Released: 1978; Label: RCA; The second half of the earlier Worldwide 50 Gold Award Hits Vol. 1	—	—	—	—	—	—	—	—N/a	—	—	—	—	—	—	—	—	
Memories Of Elvis: A Lasting Tribute To The King Of Rock 'N' Roll	Released: 1978; Label: RCA Special Products, Candlelight Music	—	—	—	—	—	—	—	—N/a	—	—	—	—	—	—	—	—	RIAA: Gold
Elvis! His Greatest Hits	Released: December 1979; Reader's Digest, RCA Custom; Unlike the original 8-LP commemorative set, the 1983 edition was 7-LP	—	—	—	—	—	—	—	—N/a	—	—	—	—	—	—	—	—	RIAA: Platinum
The Legendary Recordings of Elvis Presley	Released: 1979; Label: RCA Special Products	—	—	—	—	—	—	—	—N/a	—	—	—	—	—	—	—	—	
Elvis Aron Presley	Released: August 1980; Label: RCA	27	8	—	—	—	2	—	—N/a	—	—	—	—	32	—	—	21	RIAA: Platinum
The Elvis Presley Collection	Released: 1983; Label: RCA Special Products, Candlelight Music	—	—	—	—	—	—	—	—N/a	—	—	—	—	—	—	—	—	
A Golden Celebration	Released: 1984; Label: RCA	80	55	—	—	—	—	—	—N/a	—	—	—	—	—	—	—		
Elvis' Greatest Hits - Golden Singles Vol. I	Released: October 1984; Label: RCA; non-album box set (45 RPM records)	—	—	—	—	—	—	—	—N/a	—	—	—	—	—	—	—	—	
Elvis' Greatest Hits - Golden Singles Vol. II	Released: October 1984; Label: RCA; non-album box set (45 RPM records)	—	—	—	—	—	—	—	—N/a	—	—	—	—	—	—	—	—	
50 Years 50 Hits	Released: January 1985; Label: RCA	—	—	—	—	—	—	—	—N/a	—	—	—	—	—	—	—	—	RIAA: 2× Platinum
The Legend Lives On	Released: 1986; Label: Reader's Digest, RCA Music Service	—	—	—	—	—	—	—	—N/a	—	—	—	—	—	—	—	—	RIAA: Gold; BPI: Gold; ARIA: Gold; AFP: Platinum
Elvis, The King: 1954-1965	Released: 1989; Label: BMG Music, Time Life Music	—	—	—	—	—	—	—	—N/a	—	—	—	—	—	—	—	—	
The King of Rock 'n' Roll: The Complete 50's Masters	Released: June 23, 1992; Label: RCA, BMG	159	—	52	—	—	—	—	—N/a	—	71	—	—	—	24	—	—	RIAA: 2× Platinum; MC: Platinum
From Nashville to Memphis: The Essential '60s Masters	Released: September 28, 1993; Label: RCA, BMG	—	—	—	—	—	—	—	—N/a	—	—	—	—	—	—	—	—	RIAA: Platinum; MC: Gold
Double Features	Released: 1993; Label: BMG	—	—	—	—	—	—	—	—N/a	—	—	—	—	—	—	—	—	
Elvis: His Life and Music	Released: 1994; Label: Friedman Fairfax Publishers, RCA	—	—	—	—	—	—	—	—N/a	—	—	—	—	—	—	—	—	
Walk a Mile in My Shoes: The Essential '70s Masters	Released: October 10, 1995; Label: RCA, BMG	—	—	—	—	—	—	—	—N/a	—	—	—	—	—	—	—	—	RIAA: Gold
Elvis 77-97: The Legend Lives On	Released: 1996; Label: BMG Special Products	—	—	—	—	—	—	—	—	—	—	—	—	—	—	—	—	
Platinum: A Life in Music	Released: July 15, 1997; Label: RCA	80	—	56	—	—	—	—	—	98	—	—	—	23	—	—	86	RIAA: Gold
King of the Whole Wide World Collector's Box Set	Released: 1997; Label: RCA Victor, BMG Bertelsmann De Mexico, S.A. De C.V.	—	—	—	—	—	—	—	—	—	—	—	—	—	—	—	—	
The Blue Suede Box (His Greatest Soundtracks)	Released: 1997; Label: BMG	—	—	—	—	—	—	—	—	—	—	—	—	—	—	—	—	
Artist of the Century	Released: July 15, 1999; Label: RCA	163	—	—	—	—	—	—	—	—	—	7	—	—	—	—	—	RIAA: Gold; BPI: Silver
The Collection	Released: 1999; Label: BMG, RCA	—	—	—	—	—	—	—	—	—	—	—	—	—	—	—	—	
Elvis	Released: 2000; Label: Collectables, BMG Special Products; non-album box set (CD singles)	—	—	—	—	—	—	—	—	—	—	—	—	—	—	—	—	
Live in Las Vegas	Released: July 10, 2001; Label: RCA, BMG	—	—	—	—	—	—	—	—	—	—	63 (Note: The 2015 rerelease)	—	—	—	—	83	
#1 Hit Singles Collection	Released: 2001; Label: Collectables, BMG Special Products; non-album box set (45 RPM records)	—	—	—	—	—	—	—	—	—	—	—	—	—	—	—	—	
The Blue Suede Shoes Collection	Released: 2001; Label: BMG, RCA	—	—	—	—	—	—	—	—	—	—	—	—	—	—	—	—	
Today, Tomorrow, and Forever	Released: June 25, 2002; Label: RCA, BMG Heritage	180	21	—	—	—	—	—	—	—	—	—	—	—	—	—	—	
Top Album Collection Volume 1	Released: 2002; Label: BMG Special Products, Collectables	—	—	—	—	—	—	—	—	—	—	—	—	—	—	—	—	
Elvis Hit Singles Collection Volume 2	Released: 2002; Label: Collectables, BMG Special Products; non-album box set (45 RPM records)	—	—	—	—	—	—	—	—	—	—	—	—	—	—	—	—	
Elvis: Close Up	Released: 2003; Label: RCA, BMG Heritage	—	41	—	—	—	—	—	—	—	—	—	—	—	—	—	—	
Top Album Collection Volume 2	Released: 2003; Label: BMG Special Products, Collectables	—	—	—	—	—	—	—	—	—	—	—	—	—	—	—	—	
18 UK Number 1's	Released: November 28, 2005; Label: RCA, Sony BMG Music Entertainment	—	—	96	—	—	—	—	—	—	—	—	—	—	—	—	—	
Pure Elvis	Released: 2005; Label: Green Hill	—	—	—	—	—	—	—	—	—	—	—	—	—	—	—	—	
Elvis #1 Singles	Released: January 24, 2006; Label: BMG, RCA	—	61	—	—	—	—	—	—	—	—	—	—	—	—	—	—	
The Collection	Released: 2006; Label: BMG Strategic Marketing Group, RCA; not to be confused with the 1999 set	—	—	—	—	—	—	—	—	—	—	—	—	—	—	—	—	
Introducing Elvis	Released: August 13, 2007 (Canada); Label: RCA	—	—	—	—	—	2	—	—	—	—	—	—	—	—	—	—	MC: Platinum
Home for the Holidays	Released: August 21, 2007; Label: Madacy, Sony BMG Music Entertainment	81	—	—	—	—	—	—	—	—	—	—	—	—	—	—	—	
The King: 18 of the Greatest Singles Ever	Released: 2007 (Europe); Label: Sony BMG Music Entertainment; 18x10" 45 RPM and 18xCD sets released	—	—	—	—	—	—	18	—	—	—	—	—	—	—	—	—	
The Complete '68 Comeback Special – 40th Anniversary Edition	Released: August 5, 2008; Label: RCA, Legacy, Sony BMG	—	—	—	—	43	—	—	—	—	—	61	—	—	—	—	—	BPI: 3× Platinum
Inspirational Memories	Released: August 26, 2008; Label: Madacy, Sony BMG Music Entertainment	— (Note: 1. 27 on the Billboard Christian Albums chart)	51	—	—	—	—	—	—	—	—	—	—	—	—	—	—	
Playlist: The Very Best of Elvis Presley	Released: 2008; Label: RCA, Legacy, Sony BMG; limited edition set came with a CD and T-shirt	188	—	—	—	—	—	—	—	—	—	—	—	—	—	—	—	
Memories	Released: 2009; Label: RCA, Sony Music Custom Marketing Group	— (Note: 1. 15 on the Billboard Top Rock Albums chart in 2010)	—	—	—	—	—	—	—	—	—	—	—	—	—	—	—	
I Believe: The Gospel Masters	Released: March 30, 2009; Label: RCA	— (Note: 1. 31 on the Billboard Christian Albums chart)	54	—	—	—	—	—	—	—	—	—	—	—	—	—	—	
Elvis 75: Good Rockin' Tonight	Released: December 28, 2009; Label: RCA	43	—	—	—	—	60	—	—	—	—	—	—	—	—	—	8	BPI: Gold
The Collection	Released: 2009 (Europe); Label: RCA; not to be confused with the 1999 or 2006 sets	—	—	—	—	—	—	31	—	—	—	—	—	—	16	—	—	
The Complete Masters Collection	Released: 2010; Label: The Franklin Mint, RCA, Legacy	—	—	—	—	—	—	—	—	—	—	—	—	—	—	—	—	
The Complete Elvis Presley Masters	Released: October 19, 2010; Label: RCA	—	—	—	—	—	—	—	—	—	—	—	—	—	—	—	—	
Young Man with the Big Beat	Released: September 26, 2011; Label: RCA	—	72	—	—	—	—	—	—	—	—	87	—	—	—	—	—	
Prince from Another Planet	Released: November 12, 2012; Label: RCA	187	—	—	62	115	—	—	—	84	—	57	—	—	—	—	74	
20 Original Albums (The Perfect Elvis Presley Collection)	Released: 2012 (UK & Europe); Label: RCA, Sony Music	—	—	—	—	140	—	—	—	42	—	54	—	—	43	—	—	
Elvis Presley	Released: 2013; Label: RCA, Legacy; limited edition came with a CD and T-shirt	—	—	—	—	—	—	—	—	—	—	—	—	—	—	—	—	
Don't Be Cruel/Hound Dog	Released: 2013; Label: RCA Victor, Legacy; limited edition came with a 45 and T-shirt	—	—	—	—	—	—	—	—	—	—	—	—	—	—	—	—	
The 1950's: The Box Set Series	Released: 2013; Label: RCA, Legacy	—	—	—	—	—	—	—	—	—	—	—	—	—	—	—	—	
Original Album Classics	Released: 2013; Label: RCA, Legacy, Sony BMG Music Entertainment	—	—	—	—	—	—	—	—	—	—	—	—	—	—	—	—	
Original Album Classics; At the Movies	Released: 2013; Label: RCA, Legacy	—	—	—	—	—	—	—	—	—	—	—	—	—	—	—	—	
Elvis at Stax (box set version)	Released: August 5, 2013; Label: RCA, Legacy	—	—	—	—	—	—	—	—	—	—	—	—	—	—	—	—	
That's the Way It Is	Released: August 14, 2014; Label: Sony Music	—	—	—	—	—	—	—	—	39	—	—	—	—	—	97	75	BPI: Gold
The Album Collection	Released: March 18, 2016 (Europe); Label: RCA, Legacy, Sony Music	—	—	—	71	—	—	—	—	41	—	—	—	—	—	76	73	
A Boy from Tupelo: The Complete 1953–1955 Recordings	Released: July 28, 2017; Label: RCA, Legacy	—	—	—	48	54	—	—	—	67	—	120	—	—	—	98	82	
The Real... Elvis Presley at the Movies	Released: 2018 (Europe); Label: RCA Victor, Sony Music	—	—	—	—	—	—	—	—	—	—	—	—	—	—	—	—	
'68 Comeback Special – 50th Anniversary Edition	Released: November 30, 2018; Label: RCA, Legacy, Sony Music	— (Note: 1. 19 on the Billboard Soundtracks chart)	38	—	—	—	—	—	—	—	—	—	—	—	—	—	—	
American Sound 1969	Released: 2019 (Europe); Label: RCA Victor, Legacy	—	—	—	—	—	—	—	—	—	—	—	—	—	—	—	—	
Bravo Elvis 85	Released: 2019 (Germany, Switzerland); Label: RCA, BRAVO	—	—	—	—	—	—	—	—	95	—	—	—	—	—	86	—	
Live 1969	Released: August 9, 2019(Europe); Label: RCA, Legacy, Sony Music	—	—	—	42	40	—	—	119	19	—	—	—	—	—	43	49	
From Elvis in Nashville	Released: November 20, 2020; Label: RCA, Legacy, Sony Music	— (Note: 1. 81 on the Billboard Album Sales chart)	—	—	45	44	—	—	179	25	—	51	—	—	—	26	70	
Elvis Back in Nashville	Released: November 12, 2021; Label: RCA, Legacy, Sony Music	— (Note: 1. 10 on the Billboard Christian Albums chart)	—	—	31	32	—	—	174	25	—	42	—	—	—	39	63	
Les Disques En Or D’ Elvis Presley	Released: 2022 (Worldwide); Label: VPI	—	—	—	—	—	—	—	—	—	—	—	—	—	—	—	—	
Elvis on Tour	Released: January 27, 2023 (Note: The intended release date for Elvis on Tour was in late 2022, to celebrate the 50th anniversary of the concerts and documentary (and to abide by European Union copyright legislation to extend RCA/Sony's copyright over these recordings). However, due to manufacturing delays, the digital/streaming edition release date was different from the physical edition release date. The digital/streaming edition retained the late 2022 release date, but physical editions were not released until January 2023.); Label: RCA, Legacy, Sony Music	— (Note: 1. 61 on the Billboard Album Sales chart)	—	—	—	46	—	—	—	53	—	52	—	—	—	27	43	
From Elvis in Memphis	Released: April 18, 2023; Label: RCA Victor, Mobile Fidelity Sound Lab, UltraDisc One-Step	—	—	—	—	—	—	—	—	—	—	—	—	—	—	—	—	
Elvis Aloha from Hawaii via Satellite – 50th Anniversary	Released: August 11, 2023; Label: RCA, Legacy, Sony Music	— (Note: 1. 44 on the Billboard Album Sales chart)	—	—	58	—	—	—	—	—	—	—	—	—	—	10	33	
Elvis Presley at 706 Union Ave: The Sun Singles 1954-55	Released: March 25, 2024; Label: Third Man Records, Sun; non-album box set (45 RPM records)	—	—	—	—	—	—	—	—	—	—	—	—	—	—	—	—	
Memphis	Released: August 9, 2024; Label: RCA, Legacy, Sony Music	—	—	—	53	92	—	—	158	48	—	—	—	—	—	11	83	
Las Vegas Hilton Presents Elvis On Stage February 1973 (box set version)	Released: Jun 21, 2024; Label: Memphis Recording Service (UK & Europe)	—	—	—	—	—	—	—	—	—	—	—	—	—	—	—	—	
Sunset Boulevard	Released: August 1, 2025; Label: RCA, Legacy, Sony Music	—	—	—	14	48	—	—	170	17	—	18	—	—	—	9	67	
"—" denotes items which were not released in that country or failed to chart.

=== Posthumous compilation albums ===
==== Compilations from 20th century ====
Title	Album details	Peak chart positions																Certifications
Title	Album details	US	US Cou.	AUS	AUT	BEL (FLA)	CAN	CAN Cou.	FIN	GER	JPN	NL	NZ	NOR	SWE	SWI	UK	Certifications
Elvis – His Songs of Inspiration	Released: 1977; Label: RCA Special Products, Candlelite Music	—	—	—	—	—	—	—	—	—	—	—	—	—	—	—	—	
The Elvis Tapes	Released: 1977; Label: The Great Northwest Music Company, Redwood Records	—	—	77	—	—	—	—	—	—	—	—	—	—	—	—	—	
Elvis Speaks to You	Released: 1977; Label: Green Valley Record Store	—	—	—	—	—	—	—	—	—	—	—	—	—	—	—	—	
The King Speaks. 1961 Press Conference Memphis, Tennessee	Released: 1977; Label: Green Valley Record Store, Inc, Hammer Records, The Great Northwest Music Company	—	—	—	—	—	—	—	—	—	—	—	—	—	—	—	—	
Interviews with Elvis (Canada 1957)	Released: 1977; Label: Starday Records	—	—	—	—	—	—	—	—	—	—	—	—	—	—	—	—	
20 Fantastic Hits	Released: 1977 (Netherlands); Label: RCA Victor	—	—	—	—	—	—	—	—	—	—	—	—	—	—	—	—	NVPI: Platinum
Elvis in Demand	Released: 1977 (Australia); Label: RCA Victor	—	—	89	—	—	—	—	—	—	—	—	—	—	—	—	—	
He Walks Beside Me	Released: April 1978; Label: RCA	113	6	—	—	—	—	—	—	—	—	—	—	—	—	—	37	RIAA: Gold
Mahalo from Elvis (Note: " Mahalo from Elvis" album Side 1 had previously unissued tracks recorded in Honolulu on January 14, 1973, for inclusion in the U.S.-version of the live concert TV special “Aloha from Hawaii,” side 2 were previously issued recordings from various movie soundtracks.)	Released: September 1978; Label: Pickwick	—	—	—	—	—	—	—	—	—	—	—	—	—	—	—	—	RIAA: Gold
Elvis: A Canadian Tribute	Released: October 1978; Label: RCA	86	7	—	—	—	1	1	—	—	—	—	—	—	—	—	—	MC: 2× Platinum
Elvis Sings for Children and Grownups Too	Released: August 5, 1978; Label: RCA	130	5	—	—	—	—	1	—	—	—	—	—	—	—	—	—	RIAA: Gold
Elvis: A Legendary Performer Volume 3	Released: November 1978; Label: RCA	113	10	—	—	—	—	—	—	—	—	—	33	18	—	—	43	RIAA: Gold; MC: Gold
Country Memories	Released: 1978; Label: RCA Victor	—	—	—	—	—	—	—	—	—	—	—	—	—	—	—	—	
Paul Lichter's Elvis Memories are Forever	Released: 1978; Label: Memphis Flash	—	—	—	—	—	—	—	—	—	—	—	—	—	—	—	—	
From Elvis with Love	Released: 1978; Label: RCA Victor	—	—	—	—	—	—	—	—	—	—	—	—	—	—	—	—	
Elvis - Legendary Concert Performances!	Released: 1978; Label: RCA Victor	—	—	—	—	—	—	—	—	—	—	—	—	—	—	—	—	
Elvis in the Greatest Show on Earth	Released: 1978; Label: RCA Victor	—	—	—	—	—	—	—	—	—	—	—	—	—	—	—	—	
The First Years	Released: 1978; Label: HALW, Inc.	—	—	—	—	—	—	—	—	—	—	—	—	—	—	—	—	
Elvis Love Songs	Released: November 1979 (non-US); Label: K-Tel (NA 531)	—	—	23	10	—	—	—	—	3	—	7	—	—	—	—	4	BPI: Platinum; BVMI: Gold; IFPI Sverige: Gold
Greatest Moments in Music	Released: 1979; Label: RCA Special Products	—	—	—	—	—	—	—	—	—	—	—	—	—	—	—	—	
Volume 2	Released: 1979 (France); Label: RCA, Impact	—	—	—	—	—	—	—	—	—	—	—	—	—	—	—	—	SNEP: Gold
Inspirations	Released: November 1980 (UK and Australia); Label: K-Tel; aka "Elvis Gospels" in the Netherlands (Common Wealth Records)	—	—	43	—	—	—	—	—	—	—	4	—	—	—	—	6	BPI: Platinum
Country Classics	Released: 1980; Label: RCA Victor	—	—	—	—	—	—	—	—	—	—	—	—	—	—	—	—	
Rock 'n' Roll Forever	Released: 1980; Label: RCA Special Products	—	—	—	—	—	—	—	—	—	—	—	—	—	—	—	—	
The Elvis Explosion	Released: 1980 (Australia); Label: RCA Pure Gold	—	—	63	—	—	—	—	—	—	—	—	—	—	—	—	—	
The Legendary Music of Elvis Presley	Released: 1980; Label: RCA Special Products, Candlelite Music	—	—	—	—	—	—	—	—	—	—	—	—	—	—	—	—	
Elvis Forever Vol. 2	Released: 1980 (Europe); Label: RCA International	—	—	—	—	—	—	—	—	—	—	—	—	—	22	—	—	
The Las Vegas Years	Released: 1980 (Sweden); Label: RCA Victor	—	—	—	—	—	—	—	—	—	—	—	—	—	43	—	—	
The Ultimate Performance	Released: November 1981 (UK); Label: K-Tel	—	—	—	—	—	—	—	—	—	—	—	—	—	—	—	45	BPI: Gold
This Is Elvis	Released: 1981; Label: RCA	115	—	84	—	—	—	—	—	—	—	—	—	—	—	—	47	RIAA: Gold
Elvis: Greatest Hits Volume 1	Released: 1981; Label: RCA	142	47	—	—	—	—	—	—	—	—	—	—	—	—	—	—	
Country Music	Released: 1981; Label: Time Life Records	—	—	—	—	—	—	—	—	—	—	—	—	—	—	—	—	
The Sound of Your Cry	Released: 1981 (UK); Label: RCA	—	—	—	—	—	—	—	—	—	—	—	—	—	—	—	31	
Memories of Christmas	Released: 1982; Label: RCA Victor	—	48	—	—	—	—	—	—	—	—	—	—	—	—	—	—	RIAA: Gold
All the Best from Elvis	Released: December 1982 (Australia); Label: RCA, Starcall	—	—	17	—	—	—	—	—	—	—	—	7	—	—	—	—	ARIA: Platinum
Elvis: The First Live Recordings	Released: 1982; Label: The Music Works	163	—	—	—	—	—	—	—	—	—	—	—	—	—	—	69	
Elvis: The Hillbilly Cat	Released: 1982; Label: The Music Works	—	—	—	—	—	—	—	—	—	—	—	—	—	—	—	—	
Elvis Sings Inspirational Favorites	Released: 1982; Label: Reader's Digest	—	—	—	—	—	—	—	—	—	—	—	—	—	—	—	—	
In Love with Elvis (18 Romantic Love Songs)	Released: 1982 (Germany); Label: RCA Victor	—	—	—	7	—	—	—	—	35	—	—	—	—	—	—	—	
Romantic Elvis / Rockin' Elvis	Released: 1982 (UK); Label: RCA	—	—	—	—	—	—	—	—	—	—	—	—	—	—	—	62	
Elvis: A Legendary Performer Volume 4	Released: 1983; Label: RCA	202	—	—	—	—	—	—	—	—	—	—	—	—	—	—	91	
Remembering Elvis Presley	Released: 1983; Label: RCA	—	—	—	—	—	—	—	—	—	—	—	—	—	—	—	—	
The Beginning Years, 1954 to '56	Released: 1983; Label: Louisiana Hayride	—	—	—	—	—	—	—	—	—	—	—	—	—	—	—	—	
Jailhouse Rock / Love in Las Vegas	Released: 1983 (UK); Label: RCA	—	—	—	—	—	—	—	—	—	—	—	—	—	—	—	40	
Elvis Blue	Released: March 1984 (Australia); Label: Starcall Records, RCA	—	—	6	—	—	—	—	—	—	—	—	14	—	—	—	—	Recorded Music NZ: Gold
Elvis' Gold Records Volume 5	Released: March 1984; Label: RCA	207	—	—	—	—	—	—	—	—	—	—	—	—	—	—	—	RIAA: Gold
The Real Elvis	Released: 1984; Label: Memphis Flash	—	—	—	—	—	—	—	—	—	—	—	—	—	—	—	—	
Rocker	Released: 1984; Label: RCA	154	—	—	—	—	—	—	—	—	—	—	—	—	—	—	—	
Elvis Sings Country Favorites	Released: 1984; Label: Reader's Digest	—	—	—	—	—	—	—	—	—	—	—	—	—	—	—	—	
Elvis Country	Released: 1984; Label: RCA Special Products	—	—	—	—	—	—	—	—	—	—	—	—	—	—	—	—	
Savage Young Elvis!	Released: 1984; Label: RCA Special Products, Realistic	—	—	—	—	—	—	—	—	—	—	—	—	—	—	—	—	
32 Film-Hits	Released: 1984 (Germany); Label: RCA Victor	—	—	—	—	—	—	—	—	11	—	42	—	—	—	—	—	
I Can Help and Other Great Hits	Released: 1984 (UK); Label: RCA	—	—	—	—	—	—	—	—	—	—	—	—	—	—	—	71	
Always on My Mind	Released: 1985; Label: RCA	—	—	—	—	—	—	—	—	—	—	—	—	—	—	—	—	
A Valentine Gift for You	Released: February 1985; Label: RCA	154	—	—	—	—	—	—	—	—	—	—	—	—	—	—	—	
Reconsider Baby	Released: 1985; Label: RCA	208	—	—	—	—	—	—	—	—	—	—	—	—	—	—	92	
Elvis Ballads - 18 Big Hits	Released: 1985 (UK); Released: 1986 (Australia); Label: J & B Records, Telstar; aka "18 Classic Love Songs"	—	—	18	—	—	—	—	—	—	—	31	6	—	—	—	23	BPI: Gold
Christmas with Elvis	Released: December 1986 (Australia); Label: Hammard	—	—	65	—	—	—	—	—	—	—	—	—	—	—	—	—	
The Rock 'N' Roll Era - Elvis Presley: 1954-1961	Released: March 1986; Label: Time Life Music	—	—	—	—	—	—	—	—	—	—	—	—	—	—	—	—	RIAA: Gold
Return of the Rocker	Released: 1986; Label: RCA	—	—	—	—	—	—	—	—	—	—	—	—	—	—	—	—	
His Songs of Faith and Inspiration	Released: 1986; Label: RCA Special Products	—	—	—	—	—	—	—	—	—	—	—	—	—	—	—	—	
The All Time Greatest Hits	Released: August 3, 1987 (UK); Released: 1988 (Spain); Released: July 1, 1991 (Australia); Released: December 31, 1993 (Europe); Label: RCA	—	—	7	—	—	—	—	—	—	—	—	12	—	—	—	4	BPI: Gold; ARIA: 2× Platinum; Promusicae: Platinum; Recorded Music NZ: Platinum
The Number One Hits	Released: 1987; Label: RCA	143	—	—	—	—	—	—	—	—	—	—	—	—	—	—	—	RIAA: 3× Platinum; MC: Gold
The Top Ten Hits	Released: 1987; Label: RCA	117	—	—	—	—	—	—	—	—	—	—	—	—	—	—	—	RIAA: 4× Platinum
The Complete Sun Sessions	Released: 1987; Label: RCA	—	—	—	—	—	—	—	—	—	—	—	—	—	—	—	—	RIAA: Gold
Words and Music – 10th Anniversary Commemorative Album	Released: 1987 (Australia); Label: RCA	—	—	8	—	—	—	—	—	—	—	—	—	—	—	—	—	
Love Me Tender	Released: 1987; Label: RCA Special Products, Camden, The Special Music Company	—	—	—	—	—	—	—	—	—	—	—	—	—	—	—	—	RIAA: Gold; BPI: Silver
The Memphis Record	Released: 1987; Label: RCA	—	—	—	—	—	—	—	—	—	—	—	—	—	—	—	—	
Elvis! La Légende (The Legend Vol. 1 & 2)	Released: 1987 (France); Label: RCA	—	—	—	—	—	—	—	—	—	—	—	—	—	—	—	—	SNEP: Gold
Elvis Country	Released: 1987; Label: RCA	—	—	—	—	—	—	—	—	—	—	—	—	—	—	—	—	
Merry Christmas from Elvis	Released: 1987; Label: RCA Special Products	—	—	—	—	—	—	—	—	—	—	—	—	—	—	—	—	
Great Hits of 1956-57	Released: 1987; Label: Reader's Digest	—	—	—	—	—	—	—	—	—	—	—	—	—	—	—	—	
Elvis Aron Presley "Forever"	Released: 1987; Label: Pair Records, RCA Special Products	—	—	—	—	—	—	—	—	—	—	—	—	—	—	—	—	
Country Feelings	Released: 1987; Label: RCA Special Products	—	—	—	—	—	—	—	—	—	—	—	—	—	—	—	—	
An Elvis Celebration	Released: 1987; Label: RCA Special Products	—	—	—	—	—	—	—	—	—	—	—	—	—	—	—	—	
Love Me Tender (Romantic Elvis)	Released: 1987 (Germany); Label: Ariola	—	—	—	—	—	—	—	—	30	—	—	—	—	—	—	—	
The Definitive Country Album	Released: 1987 (Netherlands); Label: EVA Columbia	—	—	—	—	—	—	—	—	—	—	24	—	—	—	—	—	
The Definitive Gospel Album	Released: 1987 (Netherlands); Label: EVA Columbia	—	—	—	—	—	—	—	—	—	—	36	—	—	—	—	—	
The Definitive Film Album	Released: 1987 (Netherlands); Label: EVA Columbia	—	—	—	—	—	—	—	—	—	—	34	—	—	—	—	—	
The Definitive Love Album	Released: 1987 (Netherlands); Label: EVA Columbia	—	—	—	—	—	—	—	—	—	—	18	—	—	—	—	—	
The Definitive Rock & Roll Album	Released: 1987 (Netherlands); Label: EVA Columbia	—	—	—	—	—	—	—	—	—	—	17	—	—	—	—	—	
True Love	Released: 1987 (USA & Europe); Label: NCB	—	—	—	—	—	—	—	—	—	—	—	—	—	—	—	—	
17 Number One Hits	Released: April 1988 (Australia); Label: J & B Records	—	—	51	—	—	—	—	—	—	—	—	—	—	—	—	—	
Essential Elvis	Released: 1988; Label: RCA	—	—	—	—	—	—	—	—	—	—	—	—	—	—	—	—	
Elvis in Nashville 1956 - 1971	Released: 1988; Label: RCA	—	—	—	—	—	—	—	—	—	—	—	—	—	—	—	—	
Elvis Presley Stereo '57 (Essential Elvis Vol. 2)	Released: 1988; Label: RCA	—	—	—	—	—	—	—	—	—	—	—	—	—	—	—	60	
"Good Rockin' Tonight"	Released: 1988; Label: RCA Special Products, BMG Music	—	—	—	—	—	—	—	—	—	—	—	—	—	—	—	—	
50 Worldwide Gold Award Hits, Volume 1	Released: 1988; Label: RCA	—	—	—	—	—	—	—	—	—	—	—	—	—	—	—	—	
The Alternate Aloha	Released: 1988, BMG; Label: RCA	—	—	—	—	—	—	—	—	—	—	—	—	—	—	—	—	
Great Performances	Released: 1989; Label: Pair Records, RCA Special Products, BMG Direct Marketing	—	—	—	—	—	—	—	—	—	—	—	—	—	—	—	—	
An Elvis Double Feature: Speedway, Clambake	Released: 1989; Label: Pair Records, RCA Special Products, BMG Direct Marketing	—	—	—	—	—	—	—	—	—	—	—	—	—	—	—	—	
A Legendary Performer Vol. 1 & Vol. 2	Released: 1989; Label: RCA, BMG; cassette 2-pack	—	—	—	—	—	—	—	—	—	—	—	—	—	—	—	—	
Christmas Classics	Released: 1989; Label: RCA, BMG	—	—	—	—	—	—	—	—	—	—	—	—	—	—	—	—	
Elvis Gospel 1957 - 1971 Known Only to Him	Released: 1989; Label: RCA	—	—	—	—	—	—	—	—	—	—	—	—	—	—	—	—	
Все В Порядке (That's All Right)	Released: 1989 (Russia); Label: Мелодия	—	—	—	—	—	—	—	—	—	—	—	—	—	—	—	—	
The Great Performances	Released: July 17, 1990; Label: BMG	—	—	51	—	—	—	—	—	—	—	—	—	—	—	—	62	RIAA: Gold
Heartbreak Hotel, Hound Dog & Other Top Ten Hits	Released: 1990; Label: RCA	—	—	—	—	—	—	—	—	—	—	—	—	—	—	—	—	
The Million Dollar Quartet	Released: 1990; Label: RCA, BMG Music, Sun Records Company; the complete edition appeared in 2006	—	—	—	—	—	—	—	—	—	—	—	—	—	50 (Note: 2008 rerelease)	—	—	
Elvis Vintage 1955	Released: 1990; Label: Oak Records	—	—	—	—	—	—	—	—	—	—	—	—	—	—	—	—	
Hits Like Never Before (Essential Elvis Vol. 3)	Released: 1991; Label: RCA, BMG	—	—	—	—	—	—	—	—	—	—	—	—	—	—	—	71	
Elvis Presley Sings Leiber & Stoller	Released: 1980 (UK); Released: 1991; Label: RCA, BMG	—	—	—	—	—	—	—	—	—	—	—	—	—	—	—	32	
Collector's Gold	Released: 1991; Label: BMG, RCA	—	—	—	—	—	—	—	—	—	—	85	—	—	—	—	57	
The Lost Album	Released: 1991; Label: RCA	—	—	—	—	—	—	—	—	—	—	—	—	—	—	—	—	
Elvis at His Romantic Best	Released: 1991; Label: RCA Special Products, BMG Direct Marketing	—	—	—	—	—	—	—	—	—	—	—	—	—	—	—	—	
Christmas Favorites (with Jim Reeves)	Released: 1991; Label: RCA Special Products, BMG Direct Marketing	—	—	—	—	—	—	—	—	—	—	—	—	—	—	—	—	
La Voix Du Rock (The King of Rock)	Released: 1992; Label: RCA/BMG France	—	—	—	—	—	—	—	—	—	—	—	—	—	—	—	—	SNEP: 2× Gold
From the Heart (His Greatest Love Songs)	Released: August 1992 (non-US); Label: RCA	—	—	5	—	—	—	—	—	—	—	—	12	—	—	—	4	BPI: Gold; ARIA: Platinum
Blue Christmas	Released: 1992; Label: RCA; originally released on cassette in 1989	(Note: "Blue Christmas" reached number 26 on the Billboard Christmas Albums chart.)	—	—	—	—	—	—	—	—	—	—	—	—	—	—	—	RIAA: Platinum
Norske Hits	Released: 1992; Label: RCA, BMG Ariola A/S (2)	—	—	—	—	—	—	—	—	—	—	—	—	10	—	—	—	
The World Of Elvis	Released: Dec 27, 1993; Label: AmeriVox (USA & Canada)	—	—	—	—	—	—	—	—	—	—	—	—	—	—	—	—	
Romantique	Released: 1993 (France); Label: RCA, BMG	—	—	—	—	—	—	—	—	—	—	—	—	—	—	—	—	SNEP: Gold
It Happened at the Worlds Fair & Fun in Acapulco	Released: 1993; Label: RCA, BMG	—	—	—	—	—	—	—	—	—	—	—	—	—	—	—	—	
Kid Galahad and Girls! Girls! Girls!	Released: 1993; Label: RCA, BMG	—	—	—	—	—	—	—	—	—	—	—	—	—	—	—	—	
Viva Las Vegas and Roustabout	Released: 1993; Label: RCA, BMG	—	—	—	—	—	—	—	—	—	—	—	—	—	—	—	—	
Harum Scarum and Girl Happy	Released: 1993; Label: RCA, BMG	—	—	—	—	—	—	—	—	—	—	—	—	—	—	—	—	
The Romantic	Released: April 1994 (Australia); Label: RCA	—	—	4	—	—	—	—	—	—	—	—	25	—	—	—	—	
If Every Day Was Like Christmas	Released: 1994; Label: RCA, BMG	94 (Note: "If Every Day Was Like Christmas" reached number 18 on the Billboard Christmas Albums chart.)	—	—	—	—	—	—	—	—	—	—	—	—	44	—	134	RIAA: Platinum
Amazing Grace: His Greatest Sacred Performances	Released: October 25, 1994; Label: RCA	—	—	—	—	—	—	—	—	—	—	—	—	—	—	—	—	RIAA: 2× Platinum
Frankie and Johnny & Paradise Hawaiian Style	Released: 1994; Label: RCA, BMG	—	—	—	—	—	—	—	—	—	—	—	—	—	—	—	—	
Spinout and Double Trouble	Released: 1994; Label: RCA, BMG	—	—	—	—	—	—	—	—	—	—	—	—	—	—	—	—	
Kissin' Cousins, Clambake and Stay Away Joe	Released: 1994; Label: RCA, BMG	—	—	—	—	—	—	—	—	—	—	—	—	—	—	—	—	
Svenska Hits	Released: 1994 (Sweden); Label: RCA, BMG	—	—	—	—	—	—	—	—	—	—	—	—	—	18	—	—	
Elvis Presley: Cristal Collection	Released: 1994 (France); Label: RCA, BMG	—	—	—	—	16	—	—	—	—	—	—	—	—	—	—	—	
Mega Elvis (The Essential Collection)	Released: 1995 (Japan); Label: BMG Victor Inc.	—	—	—	—	—	—	—	—	—	10	—	—	—	—	—	—	RIAJ: Gold
Heart and Soul	Released: 1995; Label: RCA, BMG	110 (Note: 1. 110 on the Billboard Top Album Sales chart in 2014.)	49	—	—	—	61	—	—	—	—	—	—	—	—	—	—	RIAA: Platinum
Command Performances: The Essential 60s Masters II	Released: July 18, 1995; Label: RCA, BMG	—	—	—	—	—	—	—	—	—	—	—	—	—	—	—	—	
The Essential Collection	Released: 1994, 1995 (non-US); Label: RCA, BMG	—	—	20	—	40	43	—	—	—	—	9	—	—	—	—	6	BPI: Platinum; SNEP: Platinum; MC: Gold; ARIA: Platinum; CAPIF: 2× Platinum
Flaming Star / Wild in the Country / Follow That Dream	Released: 1995; Label: RCA, BMG	—	—	—	—	—	—	—	—	—	—	—	—	—	—	—	—	
Easy Come, Easy Go / Speedway	Released: 1995; Label: RCA, BMG	—	—	—	—	—	—	—	—	—	—	—	—	—	—	—	—	
Live A Little, Love A Little - Charro! - The Trouble With Girls - Change Of Habit	Released: 1995; Label: RCA, BMG	—	—	—	—	—	—	—	—	—	—	—	—	—	—	—	—	
Elvis Gold: The Very Best of the King	Released: 1995 (Europe); Label: RCA, BMG	—	—	—	8	—	—	—	—	14	—	—	—	—	—	21	—	IFPI Austria: Gold; IFPI Schweiz: Gold
Elvis 56	Released: March 5, 1996; Label: RCA, BMG Entertainment	—	—	—	—	—	—	—	—	—	—	69	47	—	—	—	42	
A Hundred Years from Now (Essential Elvis Vol. 4)	Released: July 27, 1996; Label: RCA, BMG	—	—	—	—	—	—	—	—	—	—	—	—	—	—	—	120	
The Elvis Presley Gospel Treasury	Released: November 1996; Label: Heartland Music, BMG	—	—	—	—	—	—	—	—	—	—	—	—	—	—	—	—	RIAA: Gold
Great Country Songs	Released: 1996; Label: RCA	—	73	—	—	—	—	—	—	—	—	—	—	—	—	—	127	
The Elvis Presley Interviews - Talking With The King	Released: 1996; Label: LaserLight Digital	—	—	—	—	—	—	—	—	—	—	—	—	—	—	—	—	
Norske favoritter	Released: 1996; Label: RCA, BMG Norway AS	—	—	—	—	—	—	—	—	—	—	—	—	6	—	—	—	
20 Aniversario (1977 - 97) (Sus Grandes Canciones De Amor)	Released: 1997 (Spain); Label: RCA, BMG España	—	—	—	—	—	—	—	—	—	—	—	—	—	—	—	—	Promusicae: Platinum
Always Elvis: His Greatest Hits	Released: 1997 (Belgium); Label: RCA, BMG Ariola Belgium NV/SA	—	—	—	—	4	—	—	—	—	—	2	—	—	—	—	—	BRMA: Gold; NVPI: Platinum
Love Songs	Released: 1997; Label: RCA, Time Life Music, BMG	—	—	—	—	—	—	—	—	—	—	—	—	—	—	—	—	
Rock 'n' Roll	Released: 1997; Label: RCA, Time Life Music, BMG	—	—	—	—	—	—	—	—	—	—	—	—	—	—	—	—	
Movie Magic	Released: 1997; Label: RCA, Time Life Music, BMG	—	—	—	—	—	—	—	—	—	—	—	—	—	—	—	—	
Christmas with Elvis	Released: 1997; Label: Razor & Tie, BMG Special Products	—	—	—	—	—	—	—	—	—	—	—	—	—	—	—	—	
24 Karat Hits!	Released: 1997; Label: DCC Compact Classics, BMG Special Products, RCA Victor	—	—	—	—	—	—	—	—	—	—	—	—	—	—	—	—	
Always on My Mind: The Ultimate Love Songs Collection	Released: 1997 (Europe); Label: RCA, BMG	—	—	—	—	—	—	—	—	—	—	—	—	—	—	—	3	BPI: Platinum
An Afternoon in the Garden	Released: March 25, 1997; Label: RCA, BMG	85	—	—	—	—	—	—	—	—	—	61	—	—	—	—	—	RIAA: Gold
Classic Elvis	Released: April 4, 1997 (Europe, Australia); Label: Camden, BMG	—	—	—	—	—	—	—	—	—	—	—	—	—	—	—	—	BPI: Gold; ARIA: Gold
Jailhouse Rock	Released: April 21, 1997; Label: RCA, BMG	—	—	—	—	—	—	—	—	—	—	—	—	—	—	—	—	BPI: Silver
More Romantics	Released: August 1997 (Australia); Label: RCA, BMG	—	—	63	—	—	—	—	—	—	—	—	—	—	—	—	—	
Gospel Favourites	Released: August 1997 (Australia); Label: RCA, BMG	—	—	84	—	—	—	—	—	—	—	—	—	—	—	—	—	BPI: Silver
Greatest Jukebox Hits	Released: November 18, 1997; Label: RCA, BMG	—	75	—	—	—	—	—	—	—	—	—	—	—	—	—	114	RIAA: Gold
Forever in Love	Released: 1997 (Europe); Label: RCA	—	—	—	17	—	—	—	—	13	—	—	—	—	—	6	—	
30 suosituinta	Released: 1997 (Finland); Label: BMG Finland Oy, RCA	—	—	—	—	—	—	—	3	—	—	—	—	—	—	—	—	
Love Songs	Released: January 13, 1998; Label: RCA, BMG	—	—	23	—	—	—	—	—	—	—	—	—	—	—	—	—	BPI: Gold; ARIA: Platinum
Rhythm and Country (Essential Elvis Vol. 5)	Released: August 8, 1998; Label: RCA, BMG	—	57	—	—	—	—	—	—	—	—	—	—	—	—	—	—	
Tiger Man	Released: September 15, 1998; Label: RCA, BMG	—	—	—	—	—	—	—	—	—	—	—	—	—	—	—	—	
Memories: The '68 Comeback Special	Released: October 13, 1998; Label: RCA, BMG	57	—	—	—	—	—	—	—	—	—	—	—	—	—	—	—	
Treasures 1953-1958	Released: 1998; Label: RCA, Time Life Music, BMG	—	—	—	—	—	—	—	—	—	—	—	—	—	—	—	—	
Treasures 1963-1963	Released: 1998; Label: RCA, Time Life Music, BMG	—	—	—	—	—	—	—	—	—	—	—	—	—	—	—	—	
Rhythm & Blues	Released: 1998; Label: RCA, Time Life Music, BMG	—	—	—	—	—	—	—	—	—	—	—	—	—	—	—	—	
The Rocker	Released: 1998; Label: RCA, Time Life Music, BMG	—	—	—	—	—	—	—	—	—	—	—	—	—	—	—		
The Romantic	Released: 1998; Label: RCA, Time Life Music, BMG	—	—	—	—	—	—	—	—	—	—	—	—	—	—	—	—	
From the Heart	Released: 1998; Label: RCA, Time Life Music, BMG	—	—	—	—	—	—	—	—	—	—	—	—	—	—	—	—	
Gospel	Released: 1998; Label: RCA, Time Life Music, BMG	—	—	—	—	—	—	—	—	—	—	—	—	—	—	—	—	
A Touch Of Platinum - A Life In Music - Volume 1	Released: 1998; Label: RCA, BMG	—	—	—	—	28	—	—	—	—	—	23	—	—	31	—	—	
A Touch Of Platinum - A Life In Music - Volume 2	Released: 1998; Label: RCA, BMG	—	—	—	—	—	—	—	—	—	—	—	—	—	—	—	—	
Aloha via Satellite (EP)	Released: 1998; Label: BMG Special Products	—	—	—	—	—	—	—	—	—	—	—	—	—	—	—	—	
Elvis the Concert - 1999 World Tour	Released: 1998 (Australia); Label: RCA, BMG	—	—	54	—	—	—	—	—	—	—	—	—	—	—	—	—	
Blue Suede Shoes: The Ultimate Rock 'n' Roll Collection	Released: 1998 (UK & Europe); Label: RCA, BMG	—	—	—	—	—	—	—	—	—	—	—	—	—	—	—	39	
Sunrise	Released: February 9, 1999; Label: RCA, BMG	—	—	—	—	—	—	—	—	—	—	—	—	—	—	—	—	
Suspicious Minds (The Memphis 1969 Anthology)	Released: April 18, 1999; Label: RCA, BMG	—	—	—	—	—	—	—	—	—	—	—	—	—	—	—	—	
Tomorrow Is a Long Time	Released: May 15, 1999; Label: RCA, BMG	—	—	—	—	—	—	—	—	—	—	—	—	—	—	—	146	
Burning Love	Released: 1999; Label: RCA, BMG	—	—	—	—	—	—	—	—	—	—	—	—	—	—	—	—	
He Touched Me: The Gospel Music of Elvis Presley	Released: November 9, 1999; Label: RCA, BMG, Coming Home Music	— (Note: 1. 15 on the Billboard Christian Albums chart in 2000)	—	—	—	—	—	—	—	—	—	—	—	—	—	—	—	RIAA: Gold
It's Christmas Time	Released: November 1999; Label: RCA, BMG Special Products	25 (Note: "It's Christmas Time" reached number 5 on the Billboard Christmas Albums chart in 2003 and #34 on the Billboard Top Album Sales chart in 2019.)	2	—	—	—	—	—	—	—	—	—	—	—	—	—	—	RIAA: 4× Platinum; BPI: Silver
Peace in the Valley: The Complete Gospel Recordings	Released: November 17, 1999; Label: BMG, RCA	— (Note: 1. 13 on the Billboard Christian Albums chart in 2001)	—	—	—	—	—	—	—	—	—	—	—	—	—	—	—	RIAA: Gold
Can't Help Falling in Love (The Hollywood Hits)	Released: 1999; Label: RCA, BMG	—	—	—	—	—	—	—	—	—	—	—	—	—	—	—	—	
Treasures 1964-1969	Released: 1999; Label: RCA, Time Life Music, BMG	—	—	—	—	—	—	—	—	—	—	—	—	—	—	—	—	
Treasures 1970-1976	Released: 1999; Label: RCA, Time Life Music, BMG	—	—	—	—	—	—	—	—	—	—	—	—	—	—	—	—	
Fun at the Movies	Released: 1999; Label: RCA, Time Life Music, BMG	—	—	—	—	—	—	—	—	—	—	—	—	—	—	—	—	
The Home Recordings	Released: 1999; Label: RCA, Time Life Music, BMG	—	—	—	—	—	—	—	—	—	—	—	—	—	—	—	—	
Tomorrow Night (EP)	Released: 1999; Label: Sun	—	—	—	—	—	—	—	—	—	—	—	—	—	—	—	—	
Elvis Ballads	Released: November 1999 (Japan); Label: RCA, BMG	—	—	—	—	—	—	—	—	—	70	—	—	—	—	—	—	
Always Elvis Vol. 2 - King of Belgium	Released: 1999 (Belgium); Label: RCA, BMG	—	—	—	—	43	—	—	—	—	—	—	—	—	—	—	—	
Legendary	Released: 2000 (Australia); Label: BMG, RCA	—	—	—	—	—	—	—	—	—	—	—	—	—	—	—	—	ARIA: Platinum
Such a Night (Essential Elvis Vol.6)	Released: February 8, 2000; Label: RCA, BMG	—	—	—	—	—	—	—	—	—	—	—	—	—	—	—	—	
That's the Way It Is (2×CD special edition)	Released: 2000; Label: RCA, BMG	—	—	—	—	—	—	—	—	—	—	87	—	—	—	—	137	
The Elvis Presley Collection – Country	Released: 2000 (originally released in 1998); Label: RCA, Time Life Music, BMG	159	19	—	—	—	—	—	—	—	—	—	—	—	—	—	—	
The 50 Greatest Hits	Released: November 18, 2000 (non-USA); Label: RCA	—	—	7	3	—	—	—	—	—	—	94	1	4	—	49 (Note: 2015 rerelease)	2	BPI: 3× Platinum; ARIA: Gold; IFPI Austria: Gold; Recorded Music NZ: Platinum; IFPI Norge: Platinum
White Christmas	Released: 2000; Label: RCA, BMG	(Note: "White Christmas" reached number 15 on the Billboard Christmas Albums chart in 2002.)	—	—	—	—	37	—	—	—	—	—	—	—	—	—	—	RIAA: Gold
Best of Artist of the Century	Released: 2000; Label: RCA	—	—	—	—	—	—	—	—	—	—	—	—	—	—	—	—	
The Love Songs	Released: 2000; Label: Green Hill, BMG Special Products	—	—	—	—	—	—	—	—	—	—	—	—	—	—	—	—	
The Gospel Songs	Released: 2000; Label: Green Hill, BMG Special Products	—	—	—	—	—	—	—	—	—	—	—	—	—	—	—	—	
Christmas	Released: 2000; Label: RCA, Time Life Music, BMG	—	—	—	—	—	—	—	—	—	—	—	—	—	—	—	—	
Elvis Greatest Hits (Denmark)/Swedish Hit Collection	Released: 2000 (Sweden); Released: 2001 (Denmark); Label: RCA	—	—	—	—	—	—	—	—	—	—	—	—	—	6	—	—	IFPI Danmark: Platinum; IFPI Sverige: Platinum
Elvis 2000 - Best of the King	Released: 2000 (Europe); Label: RCA, BMG	—	—	—	—	—	—	—	—	18	—	—	—	—	—	68	—	
The Concert - 2000 World Tour	Released: 2000 (Europe); Label: RCA, BMG	—	—	—	—	—	—	—	—	—	—	50	—	—	—	—	—	

==== Compilations from 21st century ====
Title	Album details	Peak chart positions																	Certifications
Title	Album details	US	US Cou.	AUS	AUT	BEL (FLA)	CAN	DEN	FIN	FRA	GER	JPN	NL	NZ	NOR	SWE	SWI	UK	Certifications
The Very Best Of Love	Released: January 2001 (Canada); Label: Madacy Special Products, BMG Special Products	81 (Note: The October 8, 2007 US release reached #181)	—	—	—	—	—	—	—	—	—	—	—	—	—	—	—	—	RIAA: Gold
The 50 Greatest Love Songs	Released: January 2001; Label: RCA, BMG	150	—	23	—	—	—	—	26	—	70	—	—	—	4	18	—	21	RIAA: Gold; ARIA: Platinum; IFPI Sverige: Gold
Country Side of Elvis	Released: December 3, 2001; Label: RCA, BMG	—	51	—	—	—	—	—	—	—	—	—	—	—	—	—	—	—	
Lead Me, Guide Me	Released: 2001; Label: RCA, BMG	—	—	—	—	—	—	—	—	—	—	—	—	—	—	—	—	—	
It is No Secret	Released: 2001; Label: RCA, BMG	—	—	—	—	—	—	—	—	—	—	—	—	—	—	—	—	—	
Good Rockin' Elvis	Released: 2001; Label: BMG Special Products	—	—	—	—	—	—	—	—	—	—	—	—	—	—	—	—	—	
America the Beautiful	Released: 2001; Label: BMG Special Products	—	—	—	—	—	—	—	—	—	—	—	—	—	—	—	—	—	
The Very Best of Elvis Presley	Released: 2001; Label: BMG Special Products	—	—	—	—	—	—	—	—	—	—	—	—	—	—	—	—	—	
Graceland's Chapel in the Woods (Exclusive Elvis Presley Love Song Collection)	Released: 2001; Label: BMG Special Products	—	—	—	—	—	—	—	—	—	—	—	—	—	—	—	—	—	
He is My Everything	Released: 2001; Label: RCA, BMG	—	—	—	—	—	—	—	—	—	—	—	—	—	—	—	—	—	
The Christmas Songs	Released: 2001; Label: Green Hill, BMG Special Products	—	—	—	—	—	—	—	—	—	—	—	—	—	—	—	—	—	
Nearer My God to Thee	Released: 2001; Label: RCA, BMG	—	—	—	—	—	—	—	—	—	—	—	—	—	—	—	—	—	
Best of Elvis Presley	Released: 2001; Label: RCA, BMG	—	—	—	—	—	—	—	—	—	—	—	—	—	—	—	—	—	
Junichiro Koizumi Presents My Favorites Elvis Songs	Released: August 2001 (Japan); Label: RCA, BMG	—	—	—	—	—	—	—	—	—	—	8	—	—	—	—	—	—	
Gospel Classics	Released: 2001 (USA & Canada); Label: BMG	—	—	—	—	—	—	—	—	—	—	—	—	—	—	—	—	—	
I'll Be Home For Christmas	Released: 2001 (USA & Canada); Label: BMG	—	—	—	—	—	—	—	—	—	—	—	—	—	—	—	—	—	
The Live Greatest Hits	Released: 2001 (Europe); Label: BMG, RCA	—	—	—	—	—	—	34	—	—	—	—	—	—	—	—	—	50	
ELV1S: 30 #1 Hits	Released: September 24, 2002; Label: RCA	1 (Note: 1. 5 on the Billboard Top Rock Albums chart in 2022)	1	1	1	1	1	1	1	65	3	10	1	1	3	1	1	1	RIAA: 6× Platinum; RIAJ: Platinum; BVMI: 3× Gold; SNEP: 2× Gold; BPI: 8× Platinum; MC: 5× Platinum; ARIA: 7× Platinum; Recorded Music NZ: 3× Platinum; NVPI: Platinum; BRMA: Platinum; IFPI Danmark: Platinum; IFPI Schweiz: 2× Plat.; IFPI Austria: 2× Platinum; IFPI Sverige: 2× Platinum
Roots Revolution	Released: 2002; Label: Tomato	—	—	—	—	—	—	—	—	—	—	—	—	—	—	—	—	—	
The Country Songs	Released: 2002; Label: BMG Special Products, Green Hill	—	—	—	—	—	—	—	—	—	—	—	—	—	—	—	—	—	
Elvis Sings Beatles' Songs	Released: 2002; Label: BMG Special Products	—	—	—	—	—	—	—	—	—	—	—	—	—	—	—	—	—	
The Elvis Broadcasts (On Air)	Released: 2002; Label: Stardust Records	—	—	—	—	—	—	—	—	—	—	—	—	—	—	—	—	—	
In His Own Words....25th Anniversary Aug 16th 1977 to August 16th 2002	Released: 2002; Label: Passport Entertainment	—	—	—	—	—	—	—	—	—	—	—	—	—	—	—	—	—	
2nd to None	Released: October 7, 2003; Label: RCA, BMG	3	—	4	5	40	3	11	9	—	13	38	22	16	17	5	7	4	RIAA: Platinum; BPI: Gold; ARIA: Gold; BRMA: Gold; IFPI Schweiz: Gold; IFPI Austria: Platinum; IFPI Danmark: Gold; IFPI Sverige: Gold; Recorded Music NZ: Gold
Christmas Peace	Released: November 24, 2003; Label: RCA, BMG; aka "My Christmas #1" in Germany/Switzerland	175 (Note: "Christmas Peace" reached number 10 on the Billboard Christian Albums chart and number 16 on the Billboard Christmas Albums chart.)	30	—	65 (Note: Re-titled "My Christmas #1" in 2005, it reached number 33)	—	95	13	—	—	—	—	—	—	—	—	99 (Note: 2006 rerelease)	41	RIAA: Gold; BPI: Platinum
The Movie Songs	Released: 2003; Label: BMG Special Products, Green Hill	—	—	—	—	—	—	—	—	—	—	—	—	—	—	—	—	—	
Ultimate Gospel	Released: March 23, 2004; Label: RCA, BMG Strategic Marketing Group	— (Note: 1. 8 on the Billboard Christian Albums chart)	30	—	—	—	—	—	—	—	—	—	—	—	—	—	—	—	RIAA: Platinum
Elvis at Sun	Released: June 22, 2004; Label: RCA, BMG Strategic Marketing Group	—	37	69	—	—	—	—	—	—	—	—	88	—	—	—	—	—	
Elvis Presley – American Music Legends	Released: 2004; Label: Music Catalogue Cracker Barrel Old Country Store, BMG Music Entertainment	—	—	—	—	—	—	—	—	—	—	—	—	—	—	—	—	—	
Elvis Presley – American Music Legends Christmas Favorites	Released: 2004; Label: Music Catalogue Cracker Barrel Old Country Store, BMG Music Entertainment	—	—	—	—	—	—	—	—	—	—	—	—	—	—	—	—	—	
Boy from Tupelo	Released: 2004; Label: RCA, Hear Music, BMG Special Products, Starbucks Coffee (2008); The charted entry was based on the Starbucks CD	92	—	—	—	—	—	—	—	—	—	—	—	—	—	—	—	—	
Love Songs	Released: 2004; Label: BMG Special Products, Hallmark	—	—	—	—	—	—	—	—	—	—	—	—	—	—	—	—	—	
From His Roots	Released: 2004; Label: BMG Special Products	—	—	—	—	—	—	—	—	—	—	—	—	—	—	—	—	—	
Elvis Forever	Released: 2004 (Europe); Label: BMG Special Products; combines ELV1S: 30 #1 Hits and 2nd to None	—	—	—	16	—	—	—	—	—	—	—	—	—	—	—	—	—	
Love, Elvis	Released: January 31, 2005; Label: RCA, Sony BMG Music Entertainment	120	—	79	67	11	21	—	13	—	69	218	—	21	6	—	—	8	BPI: Gold
Elvis by the Presleys	Released: May 14, 2005; Label: RCA, Sony BMG Music Entertainment	15 (Note: "Elvis by the Presleys" reached number 1 on the Billboard Soundtracks chart.)	—	22	12	—	—	—	—	—	70	—	52	7	—	—	62	13	BPI: Silver
Hitstory	Released: October 11, 2005; Label: RCA, Sony BMG Music Entertainment	—	47	28	—	—	—	—	—	—	—	—	—	—	—	25	—	31	RIAA: Platinum; BPI: Gold; ARIA: Gold; IRMA
The Definitive Collection	Released: 2005 (Europe); Label: Reader's Digest, RCA	—	—	—	—	—	—	—	—	—	—	—	—	—	—	—	—	—	
Live from Las Vegas	Released: 2005; Label: RCA, Sony BMG Music Entertainment Strategic Marketing Group	—	—	—	—	—	—	—	—	—	—	—	—	—	—	—	—	—	
Songs from the Movies	Released: 2005; Label: Timeless Media Group	—	—	—	—	—	—	—	—	—	—	—	—	—	—	—	—	—	
Elvis Rock	Released: February 28, 2006; Label: RCA, Sony BMG Music Entertainment	—	—	—	—	—	—	—	—	—	—	—	—	—	—	—	—	—	RIAA: Gold
Elvis Inspirational	Released: February 28, 2006; Label: RCA, Sony BMG Music Entertainment Strategic Marketing Group	—	—	—	—	—	—	—	—	—	—	—	—	—	—	—	—	—	
Christmas Wishes	Released: September 17, 2006 (Europe); Label: RCA, Sony BMG Music Entertainment	—	—	—	—	—	—	—	—	—	—	—	—	—	—	—	—	—	BPI: Silver
Elvis Christmas	Released: 2006; Label: RCA, Sony BMG Music Entertainment Strategic Marketing Group	68	14	—	—	—	—	—	—	—	—	—	—	—	—	—	—	—	RIAA: Gold
Elvis Country	Released: 2006; Label: RCA, Sony BMG Music Entertainment	—	—	—	—	—	—	—	—	—	—	—	—	—	—	—	—	—	
Elvis Movies	Released: 2006; Label: RCA, Sony BMG Music Entertainment Strategic Marketing Group	—	—	—	—	—	—	—	—	—	—	—	—	—	—	—	—	—	
Elvis at the Hayride	Released: 2006; Label: Louisiana Hayride	—	—	—	—	—	—	—	—	—	—	—	—	—	—	—	—	—	
Elvis R&B	Released: 2006; Label: RCA, Sony BMG Music Entertainment	—	—	—	—	—	—	—	—	—	—	—	—	—	—	—	—	—	
Elvis Live	Released: 2006; Label: RCA, Sony BMG Music Entertainment	—	—	77	—	—	—	—	—	—	—	—	—	—	—	—	—	—	
The Essential Elvis Presley	Released: January 2, 2007; Label: RCA	42 (Note: 1. 6 on the Billboard Top Rock Albums chart in 2022)	— (Note: 1. 8 in 2022)	33	—	2	—	40	11	172	—	—	—	—	35	1	15	177	RIAA: Platinum; BPI: Silver; ARIA: 2× Platinum; IFPI Sverige: Gold; BRMA: Gold
Original Recordings (Icons)	Released: July 9, 2007 (UK); Label: Green Umbrella Entertainment	—	—	—	—	—	—	—	—	—	—	—	—	—	—	—	—	—	BPI: Gold
Elvis: Viva Las Vegas (single- and 2-CD versions)	Released: July 22, 2007; Label: RCA	54 (Note: 1. 14 on the Billboard Top Rock Albums chart)	—	57	7	—	—	—	—	—	—	—	—	—	—	—	37	—	
The King	Released: August 13, 2007 (Europe); Label: Sony BMG Music Entertainment Strategic Marketing Group	—	—	4	1	—	— (Note: 1. 1 on the Canadian country charts)	—	—	—	1	—	—	2	—	—	3	1	BPI: Gold; ARIA: 2× Platinum; IFPI Austria: Platinum; Recorded Music NZ: Gold
The Complete Dutch Collection	Released: August 16, 2007 (Netherlands); Label: Sony BMG Music Entertainment	—	—	—	—	—	—	—	—	—	—	—	1	—	—	—	—	—	NVPI: Gold
Christmas with Elvis	Released: 2007; Label: Hallmark, Sony BMG Music Entertainment Custom Marketing Group	—	—	—	—	—	—	—	—	—	—	—	—	—	—	—	—	—	
Elvis at the Movies	Released: 2007; Label: RCA, Sony BMG Music Entertainment Custom Marketing Group	—	—	95	—	51	—	—	—	—	—	—	—	—	—	30	—	—	
Anniversary Rock 'n' Roll Edition	Released: 2007; Label: Rojam Records	—	—	—	—	—	—	—	—	—	—	—	—	—	—	—	—	—	IFPI Austria: Gold
La Légende du King	Released: 2007 (France); Label: Puzzle Productions; included a 90-minute DVD	—	—	—	—	—	—	—	—	163	—	—	—	—	—	—	—	—	
Love Me Tender	Released: 2007 (USA & Europe); MCPS Ireland	—	—	—	—	—	—	—	—	—	—	—	—	—	—	—	—	—	
Early Elvis	Released: 2007 (Australia); Sony BMG Music Entertainment, RCA	—	—	74	—	—	—	—	—	—	—	—	—	—	—	—	—	—	
Original Recordings (Icons 2)	Released: March 3, 2008 (UK); Label: Go Entertain	—	—	—	—	—	—	—	—	—	—	—	—	—	—	—	—	—	BPI: Silver
Playlist: The Very Best of Elvis Presley	Released: April 29, 2008; Label: RCA	188	—	—	—	—	—	—	—	—	—	—	—	—	—	—	—	—	
Elvis Presley – American Music Legends Volume Two	Released: 2008; Label: Music Catalogue Cracker Barrel Old Country Store, BMG Music Entertainment	—	—	—	—	—	—	—	—	—	—	—	—	—	—	—	—	—	
Super Hits	Released: 2008; Label: Sony BMG Music Entertainment Custom Marketing Group	—	—	—	—	—	—	—	—	—	—	—	—	—	—	—	—	—	
The King	Released: 2008 (UK, Europe & US); Label: Weton-Wesgram	—	—	—	—	—	—	—	—	—	—	—	—	—	—	—	—	—	
Rock & Roll Legend	Released: 2008 (UK, Europe & US); Label: Hallmark, Sony BMG Music Entertainment Custom Marketing Group	—	—	—	—	—	—	—	—	—	—	—	—	—	—	—	—	—	
Timeless Favorites	Released: 2008 (UK, Europe & US); Label: Sony BMG Music Entertainment, Platinum Legends	—	—	—	—	—	—	—	—	—	—	—	—	—	—	—	—	—	
Burning Love and Hits From His Movies / Separate Ways / You'll Never Walk Alone	Released: 2009; Label: Sony Music Custom Marketing Group	—	—	—	—	—	—	—	—	—	—	—	—	—	—	—	—	—	
An Evening Prayer	Released: 2009; Label: Sony Music Custom Marketing Group	— (Note: 1. 20 on the Billboard Christian Albums chart in 2010)	—	—	—	—	—	—	—	—	—	—	—	—	—	—	—	—	
The UK Sun Sessions	Released: April 5, 2009 (UK); Label: RCA	—	—	—	—	—	—	—	—	—	—	—	—	—	—	—	—	—	
Elvis: Love Me Tender – The Love Songs	Released: August 25, 2009; Label: RCA	—	—	—	—	—	—	—	—	—	—	—	—	—	—	—	—	—	
Elvis På Nært Hold	Released: 2009 (Denmark); Label: soul media	—	—	—	—	—	—	29	—	—	—	—	—	—	—	—	—	—	
Blue Christmas	Released: 2010 (New Zealand); Label: RCA, Sony Music	—	—	—	—	—	—	—	—	—	—	—	—	35	—	—	—	—	Recorded Music NZ: Gold
50 Australian Top Ten Hits 1956–1977	Released: January 2010 (Australia); Label: RCA, Legacy	—	—	9	—	—	—	—	—	—	—	—	—	—	—	—	—	—	
Elvis 75	Released: January 5, 2010; Label: RCA	— (Note: 1. 8 on the Billboard Top Rock Albums chart)	—	—	—	—	—	—	—	—	34	—	35	—	—	—	19	8	
Elvis: Best of Love	Released: 2010; Label: RCA	139	—	—	—	—	—	—	—	—	—	—	—	—	—	—	—	—	
Playlist: The Very Best Gospel of Elvis Presley	Released: 2010; Label: RCA, Legacy	— (Note: 1. 28 on the Billboard Christian Albums chart in 2018)	—	—	—	—	—	—	—	—	—	—	—	—	—	—	—	—	
Elvis 1956-1959	Released: 2010 (Scandinavia); Label: Artistmagasinet	—	—	—	—	—	—	—	—	—	—	—	—	—	—	37	—	—	
The Real... Elvis (single- and 3-CD editions)	Released: June 20, 2011 (Europe); Label: Sony Music	—	—	—	—	—	—	—	—	174	—	—	—	—	—	—	—	—	BPI: Gold; FIMI: Gold
Classic Collection Gospel	Released: 2011; Label: Cracker Barrel Old Country Store, Sony Music	—	—	—	—	—	—	—	—	—	—	—	—	—	—	—	—	—	
Setlist: The Very Best Of Elvis Presley	Released: 2011; Label: RCA, Legacy	—	—	—	—	—	—	—	—	—	—	—	—	—	—	—	—	—	
Elvis: Love Songs	Released: 2011; Label: Time Life Music, Sony Music Commercial Music Group	—	—	—	—	—	—	—	—	—	—	—	—	—	—	—	—	—	
Elvis Presley: Legacy Edition	Released: September 11, 2011; Label: RCA, Legacy	—	—	—	—	—	—	—	—	—	—	—	—	—	—	—	—	—	
That's All Right	Released: 2011 (USA, Canada & Europe); Label: Legacy Entertainment	—	—	—	—	—	—	—	—	—	—	—	—	—	—	—	—	—	
The Platinum Collection	Released: February 13, 2012 (UK); Label: Not Now Music	—	—	—	—	—	— (Note: 1. 75 on the Canadian country charts)	—	—	—	—	—	—	—	—	—	—	75 (Note: 2016)	BPI: Gold
Uncovered	Released: May 29, 2012; Label: RCA	192 (Note: 1. 49 on the Billboard Top Rock Albums chart)	—	—	—	—	—	—	—	—	—	—	—	—	—	—	—	—	
I Am an Elvis Fan	Released: July 31, 2012; Label: RCA	137 (Note: 1. 45 on the Billboard Top Rock Albums chart)	27	—	—	—	—	—	—	—	—	—	—	7	—	—	—	—	
The Classic Christmas Album	Released: October 15, 2012; Label: RCA	— (Note: 1. 22 in 2025) (Note: 1. 1 on the Billboard Top Rock Albums chart and #39 on the Billboard Top Album Sales chart in 2019.)	4	—	—	—	16	24 (Note: 2023)	—	—	—	—	—	—	—	—	—	—	BPI: Silver
The King	Released: 2012 (Europe); Label: Columbia, Sony Music	—	—	—	—	—	—	—	—	—	—	—	—	—	—	—	—	—	
Gold & Platinum Collection	Released: 2012; Label: Reader's Digest Music, Sony Music Commercial Music Group, RCA	—	—	—	—	—	—	—	—	—	—	—	—	—	—	—	—	—	
Setlist: The Very Best Of Elvis Presley 1950's Live	Released: 2012; Label: RCA, Legacy	—	—	—	—	—	—	—	—	—	—	—	—	—	—	—	—	—	
Sings by Request Love Me (EP)	Released: 2012; Label: RCA Victor	—	—	—	—	—	—	—	—	—	—	—	—	—	—	—	—	—	
La Collection RTL	Released: 2012 (France); Label: Legacy	—	—	—	—	11	—	—	—	14	—	—	—	—	—	—	—	—	
Elvis by Request: The Australian Fan Edition	Released: 2012; Label: Sony Music	—	—	4	—	—	—	—	—	—	—	—	—	—	—	—	—	—	
Return to Sender	Released: 2012 (Europe); Label: Music Digital	—	—	—	—	—	—	—	—	—	—	—	—	—	—	—	—	66 (Note: 2015)	
The Very Best of	Released: 2012 (France); Label: Wagram Music	—	—	—	—	138	—	—	—	—	—	—	—	—	—	—	—	—	
Elvis Country (Classic Collection)	Released: 2013; Label: Cracker Barrel Old Country Store, Sony Music Commercial Music Group	—	—	—	—	—	—	—	—	—	—	—	—	—	—	—	—	—	
Uncovered (Vol. 2)	Released: 2013; Label: Sony Music Commercial Music Group	—	—	—	—	—	—	—	—	—	—	—	—	—	—	—	—	—	
The '60s	Released: 2013; Label: Sony Music Commercial Music Group	—	—	—	—	—	—	—	—	—	—	—	—	—	—	—	—	—	
Elvis at Stax (1×CD version)	Released: August 6, 2013; Label: RCA, Legacy	—	—	41	64	76	—	—	—	—	41	—	26	—	—	41	53	70	
Merry Christmas... Love, Elvis	Released: October 9, 2013; Label: RCA	101 (Note: 1. 19 on Billboard Top Rock Albums chart in 2013 and #72 on the Billboard Top Album Sales chart in 2016.)	13	—	—	—	—	—	—	—	—	—	—	—	—	—	—	—	
The Nation's Favourite Elvis Song	Released: November 4, 2013 (UK); Label: RCA	—	—	—	—	—	—	—	—	—	—	—	—	—	—	—	—	5	BPI: Platinum
The Very Best of	Released: 2013 (France); Label: Wagram Music; Vol. 2 of the 2012 set	—	—	—	—	112	—	—	—	—	—	—	—	—	—	—	—	—	
Elvis Sings...	Released: 2014 (New Zealand); Label: RCA, Sony Music	—	—	—	—	—	—	—	—	—	—	—	—	18	—	—	—	—	
The '70s	Released: 2014; Label: Sony Music Commercial Music Group	—	—	—	—	—	—	—	—	—	—	—	—	—	—	—	—	—	
Showroom Internationale	Released: 2014; Label: RCA, Legacy	—	—	—	—	—	—	—	—	—	—	—	—	—	—	—	—	—	
Elvis Recorded Live on Stage in Memphis: Legacy Edition	Released: March 18, 2014; Label: RCA, Legacy	— (Note: 1. 185 on the Billboard Top Album Sales chart.)	—	100	72	—	—	—	—	—	—	—	—	—	—	—	73	74	
Elvis 80	Released: December 5, 2014 (Germany); Label: Sony Music	—	—	—	6	—	—	—	—	—	15	—	—	—	—	—	18	—	
Elvis Forever	Released: 2015; Label: RCA	11 (Note: "Elvis Forever" reached number 1 on the Billboard Top Rock Albums chart and #7 on the Billboard Top Album Sales chart.)	2	—	—	—	—	—	—	—	—	—	—	—	—	—	—	—	
Elvis: Ultimate Christmas	Released: 2015; Label: RCA	107 (Note: 1. 9 on the Top Rock Albums chart and #66 on the Billboard Top Album Sales chart.)	10	—	—	—	—	—	—	—	—	—	—	—	—	—	—	—	
Love Me Tender	Released: 2015 (Europe); Label: Mcp/Vm (Mcp Sound & Media); also included a DVD	—	—	—	—	—	—	—	—	163	—	—	—	—	—	—	98	—	
I'm Leavin	Released: April 15, 2016; Label: RCA	—	27	—	—	—	—	—	—	—	—	—	—	—	—	—	—	—	
Way Down in the Jungle Room	Released: August 5, 2016; Label: RCA	79 (Note: 1. 8 on the Top Rock Albums chart and #25 on the Billboard Top Album Sales chart.)	6	9	32	33	—	—	—	161	67	—	25	—	35	59	26	16	
Merry Christmas Baby	Released: 2016; Label: RCA, Legacy	—	—	—	—	—	—	—	—	—	—	—	—	—	—	—	—	—	
Elvis Sings Country	Released: 2016 (UK, Canada); Label: SM Originals	—	—	—	—	—	89	—	—	—	—	—	—	—	—	—	—	—	
A Boy From Tupelo - The Sun Masters	Released: 2017; Label: RCA, Legacy, Sun	—	—	—	—	161	—	—	—	—	—	—	194	—	—	—	—	—	
Elvis Presley at the Movies Volume Two	Released: 2017 (UK, Europe & US); Label: Real Gone Music Company	—	—	—	—	—	—	—	—	—	—	—	—	—	—	—	—	—	
Crying In The Chapel	Released: 2017 (USA & Europe); Label: Sony BMG Music Entertainment, Gaither Music Group	—	—	—	—	—	—	—	—	—	—	—	—	—	—	—	—	—	
Solid Gold (The Greatest Hits On Air)	Released: 2017 (Europe); Label: The Store For Music, Coda Publishing, Britanya Ltd., Musea	—	—	—	—	—	—	—	—	—	—	—	—	—	—	—	—	—	SNEP: Gold
40 Years On	Released: 2017 (UK, Canada); Label: SM Originals	—	—	—	—	—	41	—	—	—	—	—	—	—	—	—	—	—	
Elvis Presley: The Searcher (The Original Soundtrack)	Released: April 6, 2018; Label: RCA, Legacy	145 (Note: 1. 8 on the Billboard Soundtracks chart, #27 on the Billboard Top Rock Albums chart, and #46 on the Billboard Top Album Sales chart.)	17	72	38	87	—	—	—	—	58	—	81	—	—	—	64	32	
The King in the Ring	Released: November 30, 2018; Label: RCA Victor, Legacy, Sony Music	—	—	—	—	—	—	—	—	—	—	—	—	—	—	—	—	—	
When We Were Kings (with Johnny Hallyday)	Released: 2018 (Europe); Label: Le Chant Du Monde	—	—	—	—	117	—	—	—	—	—	—	—	—	—	—	—	—	
The Best of the '68 Comeback Special	Released: February 15, 2019; Label: RCA, Legacy	89 (Note: 1. 6 on the Billboard Soundtracks chart,#12 on the Billboard Top Rock Albums chart, and #16 on the Billboard Top Album Sales chart.)	9	—	—	—	—	—	—	—	—	—	—	—	—	—	—	87	
International Hotel, Las Vegas, Nevada, August 26, 1969	Released: August 9, 2019; Label: RCA Records, Legacy	— (Note: 1. 90 on the Billboard Top Album Sales chart.)	—	—	—	—	—	—	—	—	—	—	50	—	—	—	98	—	
The International Hotel, Las Vegas, Nevada, August 23, 1969	Released: August 13, 2019; Label: RCA Records, Legacy	— (Note: 1. 81 on the Billboard Top Album Sales chart.)	—	—	—	—	—	—	—	—	—	—	—	—	—	—	—	—	
American Sound 1969 Highlights	Released: November 29, 2019; Label: RCA Victor, Legacy	—	—	—	—	—	—	—	—	—	—	—	—	—	—	—	—	—	
I Don't Sound Like Nobody	Released: 2021; Label: WHBQ Memphis	—	—	—	—	—	—	—	—	—	—	—	—	—	—	—	—	—	
The Hillbilly Cat	Released: 2021; Label: WHBQ Memphis	—	—	—	—	—	—	—	—	—	—	—	—	—	—	—	—	—	
Phone Booth Bully	Released: 2021; Label: WHBQ Memphis	—	—	—	—	—	—	—	—	—	—	—	—	—	—	—	—	—	
Like A Black Tornado (Live at Boston Garden 1971)	Released: 2022 (Europe); Label: Memphis Recording Service	—	—	—	—	—	—	—	—	—	—	—	—	—	—	—	76	—	
Elvis Live 1972	Released: March 24, 2023; Label: RCA, Legacy	—	—	—	—	190	—	—	—	—	53	—	—	—	—	—	93	—	
Burning Love (The RCA Rehearsals)	Released: April 22, 2023; Label: RCA Victor, Legacy	— (Note: 1. 64 on the Billboard Top Album Sales chart.)	—	—	—	—	—	—	—	—	—	—	—	—	—	—	—	—	
Elvis Greatest Hits	Released: Jul 23, 2023; Label: Dynamic	—	—	—	—	—	—	—	—	—	—	—	—	—	—	—	—	—	
At 3:AM Sahara Tahoe - Lake Tahoe 1973	Released: Feb 23, 2024 (Europe); Label: Memphis Recording Service	—	—	—	—	—	—	—	—	—	—	—	—	—	—	—	66	—	
Las Vegas Hilton Presents Elvis On Stage February 1973	Released: Feb 23, 2024 (Europe); Label: Memphis Recording Service	—	—	—	—	—	—	—	—	—	—	—	—	—	—	—	94	—	
Elvis & Priscilla Redemption	Released: 2024; Label: PCA	—	—	—	—	—	—	—	—	—	—	—	—	—	—	—	—	—	
Just for Old Time Sake: Elvis Sings Sid Tepper & Roy C. Bennett	Released: Apr 12, 2025 (Worldwide); Label: VPI	—	—	—	—	—	—	—	—	—	—	—	—	—	—	—	—	—	
Elvis 1960 : Everybody's Got the Fever	Released: Apr 12, 2025 (Worldwide); Label: Culture Factory	—	—	—	—	—	—	—	—	—	—	—	—	—	—	—	—	—	
Elvis Live at the Houston Astrodome 1974	Released: 2025 (Europe); Label: Memphis Recording Service	—	—	—	—	—	—	—	—	—	—	—	—	—	—	—	55	—	
Viva Las Vegas	Released: 2025; Label: Popcorn Production	—	—	—	—	—	—	—	—	—	—	—	—	—	—	—	—	—	
Love Me Tender (Songs from the Original Sound Track Recording)	Released: May 16, 2025 (Worldwide); Label: Culture Factory	—	—	—	—	—	—	—	—	—	—	—	—	—	—	—	—	—	
How Great Thou Art as Sung by Elvis	Released: 2025; Label: Victory	—	—	—	—	—	—	—	—	—	—	—	—	—	—	—	—	—	
1961: The King of the Whole Wide World…	Released: April 18, 2026 (Worldwide); Label: VPI	—	—	—	—	—	—	—	—	—	—	—	—	—	—	—	—	—	
"—" denotes items which were not released in that country or failed to chart.

=== Remix albums ===
Title	Album details	Peak chart positions																	Certifications
Title	Album details	US	US Cou.	AUS	AUT	BEL (FLA)	CAN	CAN Cou.	DEN	FRA	GER	JPN	NL	NZ	NOR	SWE	SWI	UK	Certifications
Our Memories of Elvis	Released: 1979; Label: RCA	132	6	—	—	—	—	1	—	—N/a	—	—	—	—	—	—	—	72	
Our Memories of Elvis Volume 2	Released: 1979; Label: RCA	157	12	—	—	—	—	—	—	—N/a	—	—	—	—	—	—	—	—	
Guitar Man	Released: 1981; Label: RCA	49	6	39	—	—	—	5	—	—N/a	—	—	28	22	—	—	—	33	
The Elvis Medley	Released: 1982; Label: RCA	133	29	—	—	—	—	—	—	—N/a	—	—	—	—	—	—	—	—	
I Was the One	Released: 1983; Label: RCA	183	35	—	—	—	—	—	—	—N/a	—	—	—	—	—	—	—	83	
Good Rockin' Tonight (EP)	Released: 2004; Label: Rock-A-Billy Records	—	—	—	—	—	—	—	—	—	—	—	—	—	—	—	—	—	
Concert Anthology 1954-1956	Released: 2005; Label: Master Classics	—	—	—	—	—	—	—	—	—	—	—	—	—	—	—	—	—	
Christmas Duets	Released: October 10, 2008; Label: RCA	17	3	20	—	—	6	—	—	—	—	—	—	—	—	—	—	—	RIAA: Gold; MC: Platinum
Re:Versions (Elvis vs Spankox)	Released: 2008; Label: Everness, Starwatch Music	—	—	—	—	—	—	—	—	—	52	—	83	—	—	—	—	—	
Elvis the King (Elvis Meets The Love Sunrise Orchestra)	Released: 2008; Label: Fonte Records	—	—	—	—	—	—	—	—	—	—	—	—	—	—	—	—	—	
Another Dance: Elvis-X Volume 1	Released: 2010; Label:	—	—	—	—	—	—	—	—	—	—	—	—	—	—	—	—	—	
Viva Elvis	Released: November 11, 2010; Label: RCA	48 (Note: 1. 9 on the Billboard Top Rock Albums chart)	—	45	54	36	10	—	29	—	54	—	13	21	21	13	26	19	BPI: Silver; IFPI Sverige: Gold
The New Recordings	Released: January 8, 2015; Label: PRS Music, Voice Masters	—	—	—	—	—	—	—	—	—	—	—	—	—	—	—	—	—	
If I Can Dream (with Royal Philharmonic Orchestra)	Released: October 30, 2015; Label: RCA, Legacy	21 (Note: "If I Can Dream" reached number 1 on the Billboard Classical Albums and the Billboard Classical Crossover Albums charts, while reaching #9 on the Top Album Sales chart.)	—	1	2	27	24	—	—	79	34	—	17	3	21	48	27	1	BPI: 4× Platinum; ARIA: Platinum; IFPI Austria: Gold
The New Sessions	Released: November 4, 2015; Label: Mint Audio, Voice Masters	—	—	—	—	—	—	—	—	—	—	—	—	—	—	—	—	—	
The Wonder of You (with Royal Philharmonic Orchestra)	Released: October 21, 2016; Label: RCA, Legacy	47 (Note: "The Wonder of You" reached number 1 on the Billboard Classical Albums and the Billboard Classical Crossover Albums charts, while reaching #8 on the Top Rock Albums chart and #16 on the Top Album Sales chart.)	—	3	7	42	40	—	—	4	11	—	—	2	35	—	11	1	BPI: Platinum 2×; ARIA: Gold; IFPI Austria: Gold; Recorded Music NZ: Gold
The Wonder of You & If I Can Dream	Released: 2016 (Australia); Label: RCA	—	—	27	—	4	—	—	—	—	—	—	24	—	—	—	—	—	
A New Way	Released: February 10, 2017; Label: New Found Records	—	—	—	—	—	—	—	—	—	—	—	—	—	—	—	—	—	
Elvis Symphonique (with Royal Philharmonic Orchestra)	Released: August 4, 2017; Label: RCA; aka "The Wonder Of You & If I Can Dream"	—	—	27	—	—	—	—	—	—	—	—	24	—	—	—	28	—	
Christmas with Elvis (with Royal Philharmonic Orchestra)	Released: October 6, 2017; Label: RCA, Legacy	73 (Note: Christmas with Elvis reached number 1 on the Billboard Classical Albums and the Billboard Classical Crossover Albums charts, while reaching #27 on the Top Album Sales chart.)	—	7	25	83	31	—	—	—	—	—	85	7	36	—	66	6	BPI: Gold
The Tender Side of Elvis	Released: February 10, 2018; Label: PRS Music, Voice Masters	—	—	—	—	—	—	—	—	—	—	—	—	—	—	—	—	—	
Where No One Stands Alone	Released: August 10, 2018; Label: RCA, Legacy	22 (Note: "Where No One Stands Alone" reached number 1 on the Billboard Top Christian Albums and the Billboard Vinyl Albums charts, while reaching #2 on the Top Rock Albums chart and #4 on the Top Album Sales chart.)	—	15	37	54	—	—	—	158	37	—	15	—	—	—	24	9	
Elvis (Original Motion Picture Soundtrack)	Released: June 24, 2022; Label: RCA Records	26 (Note: 1. 1 on the Billboard Soundtracks chart, #4 on the Top Rock Albums chart, and #9 on the Billboard Top Album Sales chart in 2022)	—	4	16	54	32	—	—	40	18	40	73	—	—	—	11	—	
EPiC: Elvis Presley in Concert (Original Motion Picture Soundtrack)	Released: February 20, 2026; Label: RCA Records	— (Note: 1. 6 on the Billboard Soundtracks chart and #13 on the Billboard Top Album Sales chart in 2026)	43	26	11	12	—	—	—	156	28	—	26	—	—	—	16	17	
"—" denotes items which were not released in that country or failed to chart.

== Follow That Dream Records ==
FTD (Follow That Dream), RCA/Sony Music's Official Elvis Presley collector's label, was established in 1999 to serve the dedicated Elvis collector and to complement the commercial and artistic level of RCA's retail release schedule by issuing repertoire that is considered of interest to serious Elvis fans and collectors, material that is generally not part of mainstream RCA label releases to the public at large.

There are the original "collector's CDs" with CDs ranging from soundboard-recorded concerts (recorded from the mixing desk in mono) to full RCA professionally recorded concerts in stereo and CDs consisting of unreleased material from recording sessions, such as The Jungle Room Sessions, Memphis Sessions, etc. Later FTD introduced the Elvis Classic Album Series, releases of the original albums in deluxe 7" size packaging with a booklet and usually a second CD of outtakes from the same period as the recordings on the album. There is also the Movie Soundtrack Series, usually released as a single CD but again in deluxe 7" packaging with booklet. More recent releases include "book(s)+CD(s)" releases, which usually include books focusing on a particular part of Elvis' career plus related recordings from that era), and the 8" "complete sessions" releases, which contain the most complete versions of recording sessions for studio and soundtrack recordings (most often as box sets).

FTDs are released as limited edition sets (the quantities produced per release has decreased over time, reportedly due to less demand); partly for these reasons, and because the FTD market is split worldwide, FTD releases have never charted on any chart in the United States, Canada, United Kingdom, elsewhere in Europe, Australia, Japan, or any other countries to date. Nevertheless, there are 277 (including 9 box sets) albums/EPs listed below as of June 2026.

Year	Album	Album type
1999	Burbank '68	Rehearsal
1999	Out in Hollywood	Studio out-takes
2000	In a Private Moment	Home recordings
2000	The Jungle Room Sessions	Studio out-takes
2000	Long Lonely Highway	Studio out-takes
2000	Too Much Monkey Business	Studio remixes
2000	Tucson '76	Soundboard concern
2000	Follow That Dream	Movie Soundtrack CD Sampler
2000	One Night in Vegas	Stereo concert
2001	6363 Sunset Boulevard	Studio out-takes
2001	Easter Special	Studio out-takes
2001	Dixieland Rocks	Soundboard concert
2001	The Way It Was	Book with CD(s)
2001	Memphis Sessions	Studio outtakes
2001	Silver Screen Stereo	Studio outtakes
2002	The Nashville Marathon	Studio outtakes
2002	Dinner at Eight	Soundboard concert
2002	Spring Tours '77	Stereo concert from August 24, 1974 at the Las Vegas Hilton
2002	It's Midnight	Soundboard concert
2002	Fame and Fortune	Studio outtakes
2002	Elvis at the International	Stereo concert
2003	Dragonheart	Soundboard concert
2003	Takin' Tahoe Tonight	Soundboard concert
2003	Frankie and Johnny	Movie Soundtrack
2003	Viva Las Vegas	Movie Soundtrack
2003	Harum Scarum	Movie Soundtrack
2003	Studio B Nashville Outtakes 1961–1964	Studio outtakes
2003	It Happened at the World's Fair	Movie Soundtrack
2003	Girl Happy	Movie Soundtrack
2003	Fun in Acapulco	Movie Soundtrack
2003	New Year's Eve 1976	Audience concert recording
2004	The Impossible Dream	Soundboard concert
2004	Elvis Recorded Live on Stage in Memphis	Classic Album
2004	Flashback	Book with CD(s)
2004	Closing Night	Soundboard concert
2004	Kid Galahad	Movie Soundtrack
2004	Paradise, Hawaiian Style	Movie Soundtrack
2004	Spinout	Movie Soundtrack
2004	Double Trouble	Movie Soundtrack
2004	So High: Nashville Outtakes 1966–1968	Studio outtakes
2004	Follow That Dream	Movie Soundtrack
2004	Polk Salad Annie	Stereo concert
2005	On Tour – The Rehearsals	Studio outtakes
2005	Rocking Across Texas	Book with CD(s)
2005	Elvis Is Back!	Classic Album
2005	Big Boss Man	Soundboard concert
2005	Today	Classic Album
2005	All Shook Up	Stereo concert
2005	Tickle Me	Movie Soundtrack
2005	Summer Festival	Soundboard soncert
2006	Loving You	Movie Soundtrack
2006	Southern Nights	Soundboard concert
2006	Something for Everybody	Classic Album
2006	Made In Memphis	Studio outtakes
2006	Clambake	Movie Soundtrack
2006	I Found My Thrill	Soundboard concert
2006	Elvis Presley	Classic Album
2006	Let Yourself Go	Studio outtakes
2006	Writing for the King	Book with CD(s)
2007	Unchained Melody	Soundboard concert
2007	Live in L.A.	Book with CD(s)
2007	An American Trilogy	Stereo concert
2007	50,000,000 Elvis Fans Can't Be Wrong	Classic Album
2007	I Sing All Kinds	Studio outtakes
2007	Raised on Rock	Classic Album
2007	Easy Come, Easy Go	Movie Soundtrack
2007	Pot Luck	Classic Album
2007	Girls! Girls! Girls!	Movie Soundtrack
2008	Wild in the Country	Movie Soundtrack
2008	That's The Way It Is	Classic Album
2008	Elvis Sings Memphis, Tennessee	Classic Album
2008	America	Soundboard concert
2008	Love Letters from Elvis	Classic Album
2008	Nevada Nights	Soundboard concert
2008	Elvis Country	Classic Album
2008	Elvis In Person At The International Hotel	Classic Album
2008	I'll Remember You	Soundboard concert
2008	The Way It Was	Book with CD(s) (re*release)
2009	Standing Room Only	Classic Album
2009	Dixieland Delight	Soundboard concert
2009	The Wonder of You	Stereo concert
2009	Jailhouse Rock, Volume 1	Movie Soundtrack
2009	From Sunset to Vegas	Studio outtakes
2009	New Haven '76	Soundboard concert
2009	Good Times	Classic Album - 2×CD deluxe edition
2009	Girl Happy	Movie Soundtrack (re-release)
2009	The Jungle Room Sessions	Studio out-takes - 2×LP special edition
2009	Blue Hawaii	Movie Soundtrack
2009	Too Much Monkey Business	Studio remixes - (re-release)
2009	Rocking Across Texas	2×CD concert recordings (re-release - no book)
2010	Elvis (aka The "Fool" Album)	Classic Album
2010	A Minnesota Moment	Soundboard concert
2010	Elvis Now	Classic Album
2010	How Great Thou Art	Classic Album
2010	King Creole – The Music	Book with CD(s)
2010	Jailhouse Rock, Volume 2	2×CD (includes the original EP, as well as the movie versions and other outtakes from the soundtrack sessions)
2010	Chicago Stadium	Soundboard concert
2010	Elvis as Recorded at Boston Garden '71	Soundboard concert
2010	High Sierra – May '74	Soundboard concert
2010	Showtime! Birmingham '76/Dallas '76	Soundboard concert
2010	Jailhouse Rock	2×LP special/limited edition (includes the classic EP, as well as other songs and outtakes from the soundtrack sessions)
2010	Good Times The Outtakes	2×LP (outtakes from the album's sessions)
2010	Viva Las Vegas	2×LP limited edition (the movie soundtrack session)
2011	His Hand in Mine	Classic Album
2011	Live In Vegas	Stereo concert
2011	A Moment in Time	Book
2011	Guitar Man	Studio outtakes
2011	Amarillo '77	Soundboard concert
2011	Stage Rehearsal	Studio outtakes
2011	Fashion for a King	Book with CD(s)
2011	He Touched Me	Classic Album
2011	Forty Eight Hours to Memphis	Soundboard concert
2011	Elvis Sings the Wonderful World of Christmas	Classic Album
2011	Promised Land	Classic Album
2012	Our Memories of Elvis – Volumes 1, 2 & 3	Studio outtakes
2012	On Stage – February 1970	Classic Album
2012	Another Saturday Night	Soundboard concert
2012	Welcome Home Elvis 1960	Book with CD(s)
2012	From Hawaii to Las Vegas	Rehearsal
2012	G.I. Blues	Movie Soundtrack
2012	A Boy From Tupelo	Book with CD(s)
2012	From Memphis to Hollywood	Book with CD(s)
2012	From Elvis Presley Boulevard, Memphis, Tennessee	Classic Album
2012	Hits of the '70s	Studio outtakes
2012	Elvis Back in Memphis	Classic Album
2012	3000 South Paradise Road	Soundboard concert
2012	That's the Way It Is - Special Edition	2×LP (the classic album plus)
2012	Promised Land (The Companion Album)	2×LP limited edition
2012	Elvis Country (I'm 10,000 Years Old) - Special Edition	2×LP limited edition (the classic Album and other outtakes from the session)
2013	From Elvis in Memphis	Classic Album
2013	Stay Away, Joe	Movie Soundtrack
2013	Hot August Night	Stereo concert
2013	Sold Out!	Soundboard concert
2013	On Stage - February, 1970 - Special	2×LP limited edition - the original songs from the classic album plus others from that concert
2013	Cafe Europa Sessions: G.I. Blues Volume 2	Studio outtakes
2013	Moody Blue	Classic Album
2013	From Elvis at American Sound Studio	Studio outtakes
2013	Summer of '61	CD - comes with a 388-page hardcover book about the film Follow That Dream
2013	The Best of British - The HMV Years 1956-1958	2×CD limited edition - all the songs released on the British record label and includes a 440-page hardcover book
2013	Recorded Live on Stage in Memphis	2×LP limited edition (the classic album plus)
2013	The On Stage Season: The Opening and Closing Shows, 1970	2×CD - includes a 4-color 16-page booklet
2013	From Elvis In Memphis - American Sound Sessions	2×LP limited edition (the complete sessions including the classic album)
2014	Destination USA	Soundboard concert album of 1972 shows from the Las Vegas Hilton
2014	Love Me Tender	2×CD (the classic EP also includes interviews, live tracks, and outtakes and alternate takes)
2014	Memphis to Nashville '61	268-page hardcover book with CD
2014	The Best of British - The RCA Years 1957-1958	CD - all the songs released in the UK for those years and includes a 510-page hardcover book
2014	The Return to Vegas	CD (soundboard concert - the August 3, 1969 dinner show)
2014	Elvis	2×CD (the classic album plus alternate takes and live numbers)
2014	Elvis' Christmas Album	CD (the classic album plus alternate takes and non-Christmas songs from the session)
2014	Elvis for Everyone	CD (the classic album)
2014	Something for the Girls	CD (the classic "Loving You" album, as well as alternate takes, non-soundtrack tracks and also a 528-page hardcover book)
2014	Hot August Night	2×LP limited edition (recorded live at the International Hotel, midnight show, August 25, 1969)
2014	Stay Away, Joe	2×LP (movie soundtrack including alternate takes)
2014	Flaming Star	CD (the classic EP also includes and outtakes and the movie versions)
2014	Back in Memphis (American Sound Sessions II)	2×LP limited edition (the classic album also includes the rest of the sessions)
2014	In Florida (April 1975)	CD (soundboard recordings for the evening show on April 27, 1975)
2014	The Something for Everybody Sessions	2×LP limited edition (the classic album also includes the rest of the sessions)
2015	Live a Little, Love a Little	CD (the movie soundtrack also includes alternate takes and outtakes)
2015	In West Texas – Odessa, May 30, 1976	CD (the soundboard concert includes a 12-page booklet)
2015	Elvis in Alabama - The Last Double Date (Huntsville, September 6, 1976)	2×CD (soundboard concert)
2015	Elvis' Golden Records	2×CD (the classic album also includes bonus hits as well as stereo/binaural hits and the binaural session tapes)
2015	Elvis' Golden Records Volume 3	2×CD (the classic album also includes an alternate take version as well as outtakes)
2015	The Best of British - The RCA Years 1959-1960	CD - all the songs released in the UK for those years and includes a 510-page hardcover book
2015	Rock Around the Bloch	CD - also includes a 288-page hardcover book
2015	This is Elvis	2×CD (the classic soundtrack album plus expanded home video tracks)
2015	Change of Habit	CD (the soundtrack album also includes an interview with Mary Tyler Moore and a 450-page hardcover book)
2015	Moody Blue	Classic Album - 2×LP limited/special edition
2015	King Creole	2×CD (classic album/movie soundtrack includes alternate takes, movie versions, demos and acetates, and a bonus song)
2015	Now...And Again	2×LP limited/special edition (alternate takes and outtakes from the album sessions)
2015	From Elvis At American Sound Studio Memphis, Tennessee	2×LP limited/special edition (the rest of the songs not included on From Elvis in Memphis" and "Back in Memphis")
2016	The West Coast Tour '76	Soundboard concert
2016	How RCA Brought Elvis to Europe	Book and EP
2016	He Touched Me (vinyl edition)	Classic album (abbreviated double-LP edition)
2016	NBC-TV Special	Classic album
2016	Las Vegas 1975	Soundboard concert
2016	King Creole: The Mono Monitor Mixes (vinyl edition)	Classic album/Movie soundtrack (abbreviated single-LP edition)
2016	Taking Care of Business - In A Flash	Book and CD (CD includes outtakes and an audience-recorded concert)
2016	Hometown Shows	Soundboard concert
2016	His Songs of Praise - Volume 1	Book and CD (CD includes outtakes and a radio show from 1967)
2016	Elvis' Gold Records, Volume 4	Classic album
2016	Today - The Original Session Mixes (vinyl edition)	Classic album (abbreviated double-LP edition)
2016	Spirit of Jackson, MS	Soundboard concert
2016	Speedway	Classic album/movie soundtrack (2×CD)
2017	A Date with Elvis	Classic album
2017	Speedway (vinyl edition)	Classic album/movie soundtrack (abbreviated double-LP edition)
2017	Las Vegas '74	Soundboard concert
2017	His Songs of Praise - Volume 2	Book and CD (CD includes outtakes and a radio show from 1967)
2017	Elvis in Atlanta	Soundboard concert
2017	Roustabout	Classic album/movie soundtrack
2017	Elvis at Madison Square Garden	Book and CD (CD includes audience recording of first Madison Square Garden concert: June 9, 1972)
2017	Too Much Monkey Business (vinyl edition)	Studio remixes (abbreviated double-LP edition, with exclusive bonus tracks not found on 2000 CD release)
2017	The Last Movies	Movie soundtrack (compilation of soundtracks from several movies)
2017	Lake Tahoe '74	Soundboard concert
2017	Roustabout (vinyl edition)	Classic album/movie soundtrack (abbreviated double-LP edition)
2017	Kissin' Cousins	Classic album/movie soundtrack
2017	The Bicentennial Show	Soundboard concert
2018	Murfreesboro '74	Soundboard concert
2018	Rebel With a Cause '56	Book and CD (CD includes UK edition of Elvis' second album plus live concert and television performances)
2018	Elvis ("Fool") (vinyl edition)	Classic album (abbreviated double-LP edition)
2018	Omaha, Nebraska '74	Soundboard concert
2018	Off-On Stage - February 1970 Revisited	Classic album-style multitrack live concert recordings
2018	The Last Movies (vinyl edition)	Movie soundtrack compilation (abbreviated double-LP edition)
2018	The Viva Las Vegas Sessions	8" 3×CD "complete sessions" box set (Movie soundtrack - expanded edition) (first in this series)
2018	Jailhouse Rock Volume 2 (vinyl edition)	Classic album/movie soundtrack (abbreviated double-LP vinyl edition)
2018	For LP Fans Only	Classic album
2018	Holiday Season in Vegas - December '75	Soundboard concert
2018	The Wild One '56	Book and CD (CD includes soundtrack recordings plus live concert and television recordings)
2018	Cafe Europa - G.I. Blues Volume 2 (vinyl edition)	Movie soundtrack (abbreviated double-LP edition)
2018	What Now My Love (The Midnight Shows, August 1972)	Concert recordings from the April 11–12, 1972 midnight shows
2019	St. Paul to Wichita - October '74	Soundboard concert
2019	Kissin' Cousins (vinyl edition)	Classic album/movie soundtrack (abbreviated double-LP edition)
2019	The Fun in Acapulco Sessions	3×CD "complete sessions" box set (Classic album/movie soundtrack - expanded edition)
2019	Through the Lens of Phillip Harrington	Book and CD (CD includes live concert recordings)
2019	From Georgia to Florida	Soundboard concert
2019	Elvis Sings Memphis, Tennessee (vinyl edition)	Classic album (abbreviated double-LP vinyl edition)
2019	The Making of Viva Las Vegas	Book and 3×CD (CDs include soundtrack recordings, cancelled album, outtakes, and songwriters' demos)
2019	The Elvis Is Back! Sessions	4×CD "complete sessions" box set (Classic album - expanded edition)
2019	American Sound 1969	5×CD "complete sessions" box set (also released to the greater general public as a digital- and streaming-only release)
2020	Elvis in California	Soundboard concert
2020	Love Letters from Elvis (vinyl edition)	Classic album (abbreviated double-LP edition)
2020	The Kid Galahad Sessions	2×CD "complete sessions" release (Movie soundtrack - expanded edition)
2020	St. Louis & Spokane: March/April 1976	Soundboard concerts (2×CD)
2020	Tickle Me (vinyl edition)	Movie soundtrack (abbreviated double-LP edition)
2020	That's the Way It Is - 50th Anniversary Collector's Edition	Two books and 8×CD (CDs include rehearsals)
2020	The Something for Everybody Sessions (featuring the Wild in the Country Sessions)	4×CD "complete sessions" box set (Classic album and movie soundtrack combined - expanded edition)
2020	Easy Come, Easy Go (vinyl edition)	Movie soundtrack (abbreviated double-LP vinyl edition)
2020	Bruce Jackson: On the Road with Elvis	Book and 3×CD (book is a biography of Elvis' live sound engineer Bruce Jackson; CDs include live soundboard concert recordings and an "audio documentary hosted by Jack Mullins")
2021	Raised on Rock (I've Got Rhythm In My Soul)	Classic album - 2×LP Limited/Special Edition
2021	South Bound (Tampa/Atlanta '75)	Soundboard recordings
2021	Girls! Girls! Girls!	Classic album/movie soundtrack - 2×LP Limited/Special Edition
2021	The His Hand in Mine Sessions	3×CD "complete sessions" box set (Classic album - expanded edition)
2021	Las Vegas Hilton 1973	2×CD set of the Hilton shows of August 20 and September 2
2021	Fort Worth, Texas 1974	2×CD soundboard recordings of the June 16 show
2021	Love Me Tender – Through the Lens of Robert Vose	Book and 2×CD (226-page hardcover book and the classic EP/movie soundtrack)
2021	The Pot Luck Sessions	5×CD box set - classic album and the rest of the session
2021	The Making of Jailhouse Rock	Book and 3×CD box set (365-page hardcover coffee-table deluxe book and the complete sessions/soundtrack)
2022	It Happened At The World's Fair	Classic album/movie soundtrack - 2×LP Limited/Special Edition
2022	Aloha From Hawaii Via Satellite	Classic "live" album - 3×CD Limited/Special Edition
2022	Kid Galahad	Classic album/movie soundtrack - 2×LP Limited/Special Edition
2022	Pine Bluff To Madison '76	2×CD soundboard recordings of the September 8 and October 19 shows
2022	From Vegas to Tahoe	2×CD sound booth/soundboard recordings of the January 27, February 21 and May 12 shows from 1973
2022	Devil in Disguise (The 'Lost Album' Sessions)	3×CD set of masters and outtakes from the session
2022	Las Vegas '71	3×CD recordings of the January 27–29 shows from the International Hotel
2022	From Louisiana and Memphis (Shreveport • Baton Rouge • Memphis, July 1976)	4×CD recordings of the July 1–2, and 5 shows
2022	Celluloid Sell-Out!	Book and 2×CD set (448-page hardcover book and all of Elvis' soundtrack recordings from the '50s)
2023	From Elvis Presley Boulevard, Memphis, Tennessee	Classic album - 2×LP Limited/Special Edition
2023	Fun in Acapulco	Classic album/soundtrack - 2×LP Limited/Special Edition
2023	The How Great Thou Art Sessions	5×CD box set - classic album and the rest of the session
2023	The Making of Blue Hawaii	4×CD box set, 7" EP, a deluxe 387-page movie book, and a 85 page music book (Classic album and movie soundtrack)
2023	Elvis Now in Person 1972	4×CD box set and 7" EP (live recordings and studio rehearsals that were used for the documentary Elvis on Tour)
2023	As Recorded at Madison Square Garden	4×CD box set and 7" EP (live recordings and studio rehearsals that were used for the documentary Elvis on Tour)
2023	Let Me Be There (January 28, 29, February 1, 1974, Hilton Hotel, Las Vegas)	3×CD box set of the shows
2023	Houston - Fort Worth - Baton Rouge - 1974	3×CD box set of the shows from March 3, June 15, and June 17
2023	August Season in Vegas (Hilton Hotel, 1974)	3×CD box set of the shows from August 27, 29, and 30
2023	Summer of '76	3×CD box set of the shows from July 24, July 29, and August 1
2024	Stateline Sahara 1974	3×CD box set of the Sahara shows of May 19, 20, and 25
2024	The Blue Hawaii Sessions	4×CD box set (the complete session including the classic album, the afternoon show)
2024	The Making of King Creole	2×CD, 1×LP set (he classic album on vinyl, as well as the complete soundtrack recordings - also included is a 380age hardback book and 35mm film cells)
2024	The Girl Happy Sessions	3×CD set (the classic album, as well as the complete soundtrack recordings)
2024	The Last Tours (Volume 1)	4×CD soundboard recordings of the February 13–14, 16, 18-21 shows from 1977
2024	The Last Tours (Volume 2)	3×CD soundboard recordings of the March 25–30 shows from 1977
2024	California Holiday	2×LP limited/special edition (soundtrack recordings from the Spinout sessions, as well as non-movie songs)
2024	Moody Blue	Classic Album - 2×LP limited/special edition (re-reissue)
2024	Guitar Man - The '67/'68 Sessions	3×CD set
2024	Celluloid Sell-Out! (Worldwide Elvis Presley Movie Memorabilia 1960-1961)	Book and 2×CD set (hardcover book and all of Elvis' soundtrack recordings from the years in question)
2025	June '75	4×CD soundboard recordings of the shows of June 2, 5, 7, and 8
2025	Girl Happy	2×LP set (the classic album plus alternate takes)
2025	The Harum Scarum Sessions	3×CD set (the classic album, as well as the complete soundtrack recordings)
2025	Elvis '57 The Final Fifties Tours	Book and EP set (500-page hardcover book and four songs recorded in '57)
2025	The Last Tours (Volume 3)	3×CD soundboard recordings of the April 23–30 shows from 1977
2025	Harum Holiday	2×LP set (the classic album plus alternate takes)
2025	G.I. Blues - 65th Anniversary Deluxe Collector's Edition	5×CD box set, 33 RPM double-EP, a deluxe 384-page movie book, and a 84 page music book (Classic album and movie soundtrack)
2025	Good Times The Outtakes	2×LP (limited edition Ocean Blue rerelase - outtakes from the album's sessions)
2026	The Last Concert	3xCD recordings of the June 26 show from 1977 and the October 18 and December 30 shows from 1976
2026	Clambake (vinyl edition)	2xLP limited edition (movie soundtrack including alternate takes)

== See also ==
- List of songs recorded by Elvis Presley
- Elvis Presley singles discography
- ELVIS (Original Motion Picture Soundtrack)
