= The RCA Albums Collection =

The RCA Albums Collection may refer to:

- The RCA Albums Collection (Harry Nilsson box set)
- The RCA Albums Collection (Elvis Presley box set)
