= A Boy from Tupelo: The Complete 1953–1955 Recordings =

Box set by Elvis Presley
- Released: July 28, 2017
- Length: 3:40:48
- Labels: RCA; Legacy

Elvis Presley chronology
The Wonder of You (2016)	A Boy from Tupelo: The Complete 1953–1955 Recordings (2017)	Christmas with Elvis and the Royal Philharmonic Orchestra (2017)

A Boy from Tupelo: The Complete 1953–1955 Recordings is a box set of the earliest recordings by Elvis Presley, released on July 28, 2017, by RCA Records and Legacy Recordings.

== Contents ==
The box set contains all of Presley's earliest recordings from 1953 to 1955, and all of his earliest singles.

== Release and reception ==
Professional ratings
Aggregate scores
Source	Rating
Metacritic	95/100
Review scores
Source	Rating
AllMusic	5/5 stars
Mojo	5/5 stars
PopMatters	7/10
Rolling Stone	5/5 stars
Uncut	4/5 stars

According to the review aggregator Metacritic, A Boy from Tupelo received "universal acclaim" based on a weighted average score of 95 out of 100 from 5 critic scores.

Senior AllMusic critic Stephen Thomas Erlewine writes that "it could as easily been dubbed The Sun Years", as it contains all of his Sun Records recordings. He notes that it "presents all this music in a logical, orderly sequence that suits Legacy's previous big Presley boxes", highlighting the 2011 set Young Man with the Big Beat: The Complete 1956 Masters, a similar set that focuses on his 1956 recordings. He concludes by writing "no matter how well executed A Boy from Tupelo is -- and it's very well done, boasting a handsome, detailed book and clean sound -- it can't help but feel a little old hat. Still, those consumers in the market for the earliest Elvis will be satisfied by this, as it not only has everything in one convenient box but the addition of the live material does provide a nice coda to the familiar Sun sessions." Will Hermes wrote in a 5-star review for Rolling Stone that "The sound quality is likely as good as it’ll ever get, and the performances are musical bedrock" noting that "More’d be fine. Ditto the Louisiana Hayride live recordings here, which show a 19[ ]and then 20-year-old galloping headlong into fame’s stratosphere." In a review for NPR, Tom Moon wrote that "A Boy From Tupelo presents the well-known biographical details from the Presley trajectory as they unfolded, week by week, with galvanic musical accidents followed by unremarkable contract signings and radio station visits", commenting that "Not all of this "process" stuff can be considered essential, but many of the studio alternates are worth hearing", he concluding by noting that "It was just another gig in a career of thousands, but as this set makes clear, sometimes an ordinary gig (or song or clowning moment) can trigger a cultural contagion."

== Charts ==
Chart (2017)	Peak position
Austrian Albums (Ö3 Austria)	48
Belgian Albums (Ultratop Flanders)	72
Belgian Albums (Ultratop Wallonia)	54
Dutch Albums (Album Top 100)	120
German Albums (Offizielle Top 100)	67
Spanish Albums (Promusicae)	68
Swedish Albums (Sverigetopplistan)	98
Scottish Albums (Official Charts)	52
UK Albums (Official Charts)	82
