= Elvis in Hollywood =

Compilation album by Elvis Presley
- Released: January 7, 1976
- Recorded: April 1957 – October 1968
- Genre: Rock and roll
- Length: 46:12
- Label: RCA Special Products/Brookville Records

Elvis Presley chronology
Today (1975)	Elvis in Hollywood (1976)	Elvis: A Legendary Performer Volume 2 (1975)

Elvis in Hollywood is a 2 record compilation album by American rock and roll singer Elvis Presley, issued in January 1976 by RCA Special Products in association with Brookville Records. The double album contained several songs from Presley's films released from 1956 to 1968. Elvis in Hollywood is the second and last TV mail-order album issued during Presley's lifetime and was certified platinum on December 2, 2010 by the Recording Industry Association of America.

The double LP set included a 20-page booklet. The album was also available on 8-track and cassette tape.

== Track listing ==
Side 1
No.	Title	Writer(s)	Date recorded	Length
1.	"Jailhouse Rock"	Jerry Leiber, Mike Stoller	April 30, 1957	2:27
2.	"Rock-A-Hula Baby"	Ben Weisman, Fred Wise and Dolores Fuller	March 23, 1961	1:59
3.	"G.I. Blues"	Sid Tepper and Roy C. Bennett	April 27, 1960	2:36
4.	"Kissin' Cousins"	Fred Wise and Randy Starr	September 30, 1963	2:14
5.	"Wild in the Country"	Luigi Creatore, Hugo Peretti, George David Weiss	November 7, 1960	1:58

Side 2
No.	Title	Writer(s)	Date recorded	Length
6.	"King Creole"	Jerry Leiber and Mike Stoller	January 16, 1958	2:16
7.	"Blue Hawaii"	Leo Robin and Ralph Rainger	March 22, 1961	2:36
8.	"Fun in Acapulco"	Ben Weisman and Sid Wayne	January 23, 1963	2:30
9.	"Follow That Dream"	Fred Wise and Ben Weisman	July 2, 1961	1:39
10.	"Girls! Girls! Girls!"	Jerry Leiber and Mike Stoller	March 27, 1962	2:34

Side 3
No.	Title	Writer(s)	Date recorded	Length
11.	"Viva Las Vegas"	Doc Pomus, Mort Shuman	July 10, 1963	2:27
12.	"Bossa Nova Baby"	Jerry Leiber and Mike Stoller	January 22, 1963	2:02
13.	"Flaming Star"	Sid Wayne and Sherman Edwards	October 7, 1960	2:25
14.	"Girl Happy"	Doc Pomus and Norman Meade	June 10, 1964	2:07
15.	"Frankie and Johnny"	Alex Gottlieb, Fred Karger, Ben Weisman	May 14, 1965	2:32

Side 4
No.	Title	Writer(s)	Date recorded	Length
16.	"Roustabout"	Bernie Baum, Bill Giant, Florence Kaye	April 29, 1964	1:56
17.	"Spinout"	Ben Weisman, Dolores Fuller, Sid Wayne	February 17, 1966	2:32
18.	"Double Trouble"	Doc Pomus, Mort Shuman	June 29, 1966	1:38
19.	"Charro"	Billy Strange, Mac Davis	October 15, 1968	2:45
20.	"They Remind Me Too Much of You"	Don Robertson	September 22, 1962	2:30

== Certifications ==
Region	Certification	Certified units/sales
United States (RIAA)	Platinum	1,000,000^{^}
^{^} Shipments figures based on certification alone.
