= Elvis by the Presleys =

Compilation album by Elvis Presley

Elvis by the Presleys is a compilation album by American singer and musician Elvis Presley, released as the soundtrack to the TV documentary of the same name. It includes one disc with a selection of previously released tracks and a bonus disc with 8 rarities.

The songs on the first disc appear roughly chronologically, thematically classified by the documentary categories "On Stage," "Elvis Meets Priscilla," "Introducing Mrs. Presley," "The Seeker," "After Dark," "Taking Care of Business," "The Generous," "The King," "The Inner Child," "Style" and "Forever."

== Track listing ==
=== Disc 1 ===
1. "Trying to Get to You"
2. "Heartbreak Hotel"
3. "I Want You, I Need You, I Love You"
4. "I Got a Woman"
5. "Got a Lot o' Livin' to Do!"
6. "(There'll Be) Peace in the Valley (for Me)"
7. "Trouble"
8. "Hawaiian Wedding Song"
9. "Indescribably Blue"
10. "In the Ghetto"
11. "Suspicious Minds"
12. "I'll Hold You in My Heart (Till I Can Hold You in My Arms)"
13. "Bridge over Troubled Water"
14. "You've Lost That Loving Feeling" (Live in Las Vegas, 1970)
15. "It's Over" (Live in Las Vegas, 1972)
16. "Separate Ways"
17. "Always on My Mind"
18. "My Way"
19. "Burning Love"
20. "Welcome to My World" (Live in Hawaii, 1973)
21. "Steamroller Blues" (Live in Hawaii, 1973)
22. "I Got a Feelin' in My Body"
23. "If I Can Dream"
24. "A Little Less Conversation (JXL Radio Edit Remix)"

=== Disc 2 ===
1. "It Wouldn't Be the Same Without You" (Demo)
2. "Jailhouse Rock" (Takes 3-5)
3. "Anything That's Part of You" (Take 9)
4. "You'll Be Gone" (Take 2)
5. "Too Much Monkey Business" (Takes 4, 10)
6. "Baby What You Want Me to Do" (Private Linda Thompson Recording, 1973)
7. "I'm So Lonesome I Could Cry" (Private Linda Thompson Recording, 1973)
8. "Blue Christmas" (Live in Norman, Oklahoma, 1977)
