= Guitar Man (Elvis Presley album) =

Remix album by Elvis Presley
- Released: January 1981
- Recorded: 1966–1970, 1973, 1976 (Elvis' vocals from original recordings); 1980 (new backing tracks)
- Studio: Young 'Un Sound, Nashville, Tennessee
- Genre: Country
- Length: 29:24
- Label: RCA
- Producer: Felton Jarvis

Elvis Presley chronology
Elvis Aron Presley (1980)	Guitar Man (1981)	This Is Elvis (1981)

Singles from Guitar Man
- 1. "Guitar Man" b/w "Faded Love" Released: January 2, 1981

Guitar Man is an Elvis Presley album released by RCA Records in January 1981. The album consists of ten songs that Presley's longtime producer, Felton Jarvis, took and re-imagined for a contemporary sound. The instrumentation and backing singers from the original recordings were stripped away for new instrumentation. The process began on January 15, 1980, and lasted through November 11, 1980, with 40 songs being reworked. In 2000, Follow That Dream records released a CD, Too Much Monkey Business, that included the original album with 10 additional tracks from these sessions.

Singer-songwriter Jerry Reed was recruited to lay down the guitar work on the new version of the song "Guitar Man", which he had done the same on the original Elvis recording in 1967. This time, instead of an acoustic, Reed overdubbed electric guitar that gave the rocker a more modern sound and contributed to its No. 1 C&W and No. 28 POP status when issued as the LP's lead A-side in January 1981. In the United States, the album peaked at number 49 on the Billboard albums chart and number 6 on the Billboard country albums chart.

== Track listing ==
Side one
No.	Title	Length
1.	"Guitar Man"	2:50
2.	"After Loving You"	3:21
3.	"Too Much Monkey Business"	2:49
4.	"Just Call Me Lonesome"	2:04
5.	"Lovin' Arms"	3:00

Side two
No.	Title	Length
1.	"You Asked Me To"	2:59
2.	"Clean Up Your Own Backyard"	3:10
3.	"She Thinks I Still Care"	3:36
4.	"Faded Love"	2:53
5.	"I'm Moving On"	2:47
