= Blue Christmas (Elvis Presley album) =

Compilation album by Elvis Presley
- Released: (United States) 1992
- Recorded: 1957, 1971
- Genre: Christmas
- Length: 17:04
- Producer: Felton Jarvis, Steve Sholes

Blue Christmas is a 1992 Christmas compilation album with songs sung by American singer and musician Elvis Presley. Elvis is accompanied by the vocal group the Jordanaires on the recordings from 1957, recorded and initially released on for Elvis' Christmas Album, and by The Imperials on the recordings from 1971, which were recorded and initially released on Elvis Sings the Wonderful World of Christmas.

== Track listing ==
1976 album

No.	Title	Writer(s)	Recording date	Length
1.	"Blue Christmas"	Billy Hayes and Jay Johnson	September 5, 1957	2:05
2.	"O Come, All Ye Faithful"	Traditional; arranged by Elvis Presley	May 16, 1971	2:47
3.	"On A Snowy Christmas Night"	Stanley Gelber	May 16, 1971	2:46
4.	"It Won’t Seem Like Christmas (Without You)"	J.A. Balthrop	May 15, 1971	2:38
5.	"Holly Leaves and Christmas Trees"	Red West and Glen Spreen	May 15, 1971	2:12
6.	"Santa Bring My Baby Back (To Me)"	Aaron Schroeder and Claude Demetrius	September 7, 1957	1:52
7.	"I’ll Be Home on Christmas Day"	Michael Jarrett	May 16, 1971	3:48
8.	"Santa Claus Is Back in Town"	Jerry Leiber and Mike Stoller	September 7, 1957	2:21
9.	"Silent Night"	Joseph Mohr and Franz Gruber; arranged by Presley	September 6, 1957	2:23
10.	"Here Comes Santa Claus (Right Down Santa Claus Lane)"	Gene Autry and Oakley Haldeman	September 6, 1957	2:00
11.	"Winter Wonderland"	Felix Bernard, Richard B. Smith	May 16, 1971	3:17? Or 2:17?
12.	"White Christmas"	Irving Berlin	September 6, 1957	2:23
13.	"Silver Bells"	Jay Livingston, Ray Evans	May 15, 1971	2:27
14.	"Mama Liked the Roses"	John Christopher	1969	2:35

1992 album

No.	Title	Writer(s)	Recording date	Length
1.	"O Come, All Ye Faithful"	Traditional; arranged by Elvis Presley	May 16, 1971	2:47
2.	"The First Noel"	Traditional; arranged by Presley	May 16, 1971	2:08
3.	"Winter Wonderland"	Felix Bernard, Richard B. Smith	May 16, 1971	2:17
4.	"Silver Bells"	Jay Livingston, Ray Evans	May 15, 1971	2:27
5.	"Blue Christmas"	Billy Hayes and Jay Johnson	September 5, 1957	2:05
6.	"Silent Night"	Joseph Mohr and Franz Gruber; arranged by Presley)	September 6, 1957	2:23
7.	"White Christmas"	Irving Berlin	September 6, 1957	2:23
8.	"I'll Be Home for Christmas"	Kim Gannon, Walter Kent, Buck Ram	September 7, 1957	1:54
