= Suspicious Minds (album) =

Compilation album by Elvis Presley
- Released: April 18, 1999
- Recorded: January – February 1969
- Genre: Rock
- Length: 2:13:00
- Label: RCA
- Producer: Ernst Mikael Jorgensen, Roger Semon

Elvis Presley chronology
Sunrise (1999)	Suspicious Minds (1999)	Tomorrow Is A Long Time (1999)

Professional ratings
Review scores
Source	Rating
Allmusic	5/5 stars
Q	4/5 stars

Suspicious Minds: The Memphis 1969 Anthology is a two-disc compilation of Elvis Presley's studio recordings at American Sound Studio during the winter of 1969, released in 1999, RCA 67677-2. This set features all of the master recordings made by Presley that would eventually feature on multiple singles as well as the albums From Elvis in Memphis and the studio disk of From Memphis to Vegas/From Vegas to Memphis. Original recordings produced by Chips Moman and Felton Jarvis.

== Contents ==
For the bulk of the 1960s, Elvis had been trapped in a cycle of making three movies a year, and recording their attendant soundtracks in either Nashville or Hollywood. After the success of his Christmas special on NBC in December 1968, Presley made a decision not to continue with business as usual, but instead to return to recording in his hometown of Memphis, Tennessee, to take advantage of the thriving soul music scene active at the city's studios such as Stax and Hi Records. Presley chose American Studios, run by songwriter Chips Moman, for several reasons. First, their music staff was populated by session musicians steeped in Elvis' upbringing in blues, country, gospel, and rock and roll; second, they knew how to give the music a "commercial" gloss, Moman having already produced or written hits for Aretha Franklin and The Box Tops; third, after hitting the top ten on the singles chart only once since 1963 with a song that had been recorded in 1960, Presley needed hits.

The choice would prove fortuitous, as singles gleaned from these sessions would yield three top ten hits, including the last chart-topper of Presley's career, his latter-day signature song "Suspicious Minds." The album work would be equally respected, From Elvis in Memphis being considered by myriad sources as one of Presley's greatest. In 2003, the album was ranked number 190 on Rolling Stone magazine's list of the 500 greatest albums of all time.

The first twelve tracks of disc one present From Elvis in Memphis in order, including the lead single of "In the Ghetto" backed with "Any Day Now," released two months before the album hit the stores. It continues with the hit singles and "Stranger in My Own Hometown," a song Presley would return to in the future, a Rehearsal version issued on disc five of the 1970s box set. The second disc compiles the balance of From Memphis to Vegas, along with the remaining masters that ended up buttressing various albums in the 1970s. Ten alternate takes are included, along with a previously unissued snippet of a song attempted at the sessions but never completed. The success of this material would infuse Presley's career with a new vigor, which would fuel re-acquaintance with his talents both in the studio and in live performance during the early years of the new decade.

== Track listing ==
Chart positions for LPs Billboard 200 chart; positions for singles from Billboard Hot 100 chart.

=== Disc one ===
Track	Recorded	Original LP Issue	Catalogue	Release date	Chart peak	Song title	Writer(s)	Time
1.	1/13/69	From Elvis in Memphis	LSP 4155	6/17/69	#13	Wearin' That Loved-On Look	A. L. Owens and Dallas Frazier	2:44
2.	2/19/69	From Elvis in Memphis	LSP 4155	6/17/69	#13	Only the Strong Survive	Jerry Butler, Kenny Gamble, Leon Huff	2:40
3.	1/22/69	From Elvis in Memphis	LSP 4155	6/17/69	#13	I'll Hold You In My Heart	Eddy Arnold, Tommy Dilbeck, Hal Horton	4:32
4.	1/13/69	From Elvis in Memphis	LSP 4155	6/17/69	#13	Long Black Limousine	Bobby George and Vern Stovall	3:37
5.	2/20/69	From Elvis in Memphis	LSP 4155	6/17/69	#13	It Keeps Right On a-Hurtin'	Johnny Tillotson	2:36
6.	1/14/69	From Elvis in Memphis	LSP 4155	6/17/69	#13	I'm Moving On	Hank Snow	2:52
7.	2/18/69	From Elvis in Memphis	LSP 4155	6/17/69	#13	Power of My Love	Bernie Baum, Bill Giant, Florence Kaye	2:34
8.	1/14/69	From Elvis in Memphis	LSP 4155	6/17/69	#13	Gentle On My Mind	John Hartford	3:20
9.	2/18/69	From Elvis in Memphis	LSP 4155	6/17/69	#13	After Loving You	Johnny Lantz and Eddie Miller	3:05
10.	2/17/69	From Elvis in Memphis	LSP 4155	6/17/69	#13	True Love Travels on a Gravel Road	Dallas Frazier and A. L. Owens	2:37
11.	2/20/69	From Elvis in Memphis	47-9741b	4/14/69		Any Day Now	Burt Bacharach and Bob Hilliard	2:58
12.	1/20/69	From Elvis in Memphis	47-9741	4/14/69	#3	In the Ghetto	Mac Davis	2:45
13.	1/15/69		47-9835b	4/20/70		Mama Liked the Roses	Johnny Christopher	2:47
14.	1/22/69		47–9764	8/26/69	#1	Suspicious Minds	Mark James	3:28
15.	1/14/69	Memphis to Vegas	47-9764b	8/26/69		You'll Think of Me	Mort Shuman	3:58
16.	1/15/69		47–9768	11/11/69	#6	Don't Cry Daddy	Mac Davis	2:46
17.	2/21/69	Memphis to Vegas	47-9747b	6/17/69		The Fair Is Moving On	Guy Fletcher and Doug Flett	3:07
18.	2/19/69		47–9791	1/29/70	#16	Kentucky Rain	Eddie Rabbitt and Dick Heard	3:14
19.	2/17/69	Memphis to Vegas	LSP 6020	11/69	#12	Stranger In My Own Home Town	Percy Mayfield	4:23
20.	1/22/69	Memphis to Vegas	LSP 6020	11/69	#12	Without Love (There Is Nothing)	Danny Small	2:51

=== Disc two ===
Track	Recorded	Original LP Issue	Catalogue	Release date	Chart peak	Song title	Writer(s)	Time
1.	2/17/69	From Nashville to Memphis	66160-2	9/28/93		This Time / I Can't Stop Loving You	Chips Moman / Don Gibson	3:50
2.	2/18/69	unreleased alternate take				After Loving You	Johnny Lantz and Eddie Miller	3:38
3.	1/22/69	unreleased alternate take				Without Love (There Is Nothing)	Danny Small	2:59
4.	1/14/69	unreleased alternate mix and vocal				I'm Moving On	Hank Snow	2:58
5.	1/21/69	Memphis to Vegas	LSP 6020	11/69	#12	From A Jack To A King	Ned Miller	2:23
6.	2/20/69	unreleased alternate take				It Keeps Right On a-Hurtin'	Johnny Tillotson	2:53
7.	2/17/69	unreleased alternate take				True Love Travels on a Gravel Road	Dallas Frazier and A. L. Owens	2:28
8.	2/18/69	unreleased alternate take				Power of My Love	Bernie Baum, Bill Giant, Florence Kaye	3:15
9.	1/14/69	unreleased alternate take				You'll Think of Me	Mort Shuman	4:33
10.	2/20/69	Let's Be Friends	CAS 2408	4/70	#105	If I'm A Fool (For Loving You)	Stan Kesler	2:43
11.	2/18/69	Memphis to Vegas	LSP 6020	11/69	#12	Do You Know Who I Am?	Bobby Russell	2:47
12.	1/14/69	Memphis to Vegas	LSP 6020	11/69	#12	A Little Bit of Green	Calvin Arnold, David Martin, Geoff Morrow	3:21
13.	2/17/69	Memphis to Vegas	LSP 6020	11/69	#12	And the Grass Won't Pay No Mind	Neil Diamond	3:08
14.	1/13/69	Memphis to Vegas	LSP 6020	11/69	#12	This Is the Story	Calvin Arnold, David Martin, Geoff Morrow	2:28
15.	1/22/69	Let's Be Friends	CAS 2408	4/70	#105	I'll Be There	Bobby Darin	2:21
16.	1/21/69	Elvis Now	LSP 4671	2/20/72	#43	Hey Jude	John Lennon and Paul McCartney	4:29
17.	1/20/69	Almost In Love	47-9768b	11/11/69		Rubberneckin'	Dory Jones and Bunny Warren	2:09
18.	1/21/69	previously unreleased				Poor Man's Gold	Mac Davis	0:13
19.	1/15/69	Memphis to Vegas	LSP 6020	11/69	#12	Inherit the Wind	Eddie Rabbitt	2:56
20.	1/16/69	Almost In Love	47-9791b	1/29/70		My Little Friend	Shirl Milete	2:43
21.	2/22/69	You'll Never Walk Alone	CALX 2472	3/22/71	#69	Who Am I?	Charles Rusty Goodman	2:07
22.	2/19/69	unreleased alternate take				Kentucky Rain	Eddie Rabbitt and Dick Heard	3:12
23.	1/22/69	unreleased alternate take				Suspicious Minds	Mark James	3:53
24.	1/20/69	unreleased alternate take				In the Ghetto	Mac Davis	2:40

== Personnel ==
- Elvis Presley – vocals, guitar, piano
- Reggie Young – guitar, electric sitar
- Bobby Wood – piano
- Bobby Emmons – organ
- Tommy Cogbill – bass
- Mike Leech – bass
- Gene Chrisman – drums
- Ed Kollis – harmonica
- R.F. Taylor – trumpet
- Wayne Jackson – trumpet
- Dick Steff – trumpet
- Ed Logan – trombone
- Jack Hale – trombone
- Gerald Richardson – trombone
- Jackie Thomas – saxophone, trombone
- Andrew Love – saxophone
- Glen Spreen – saxophone, string and horn arrangements
- J.P. Luper – saxophone
- Tony Cason – French horn
- Joe D'Gerolamo – French horn
- Joe Babcock – backing vocals
- Dolores Edgin – backing vocals
- Mary Greene – backing vocals
- Charlie Hodge – backing vocals
- Ginger Holladay – backing vocals
- Mary Holladay – backing vocals
- Millie Kirkham – backing vocals
- June Page – backing vocals
- Susan Pilkington – backing vocals
- Sandy Posey – backing vocals
- Donna Thatcher – backing vocals
- Hurschel Wiginton – backing vocals
