= Change of Habit =

1969 film by William A. Graham

- Theatrical release poster
- Directed by: William A. Graham
- Screenplay by: James Lee; S.S. Schweitzer; Eric Bercovici
- Story by: John Joseph; Richard Morris
- Produced by: Joe Connelly
- Starring: Elvis Presley; Mary Tyler Moore; Barbara McNair; Jane Elliot
- Cinematography: Russell Metty
- Edited by: Douglas Stewart
- Music by: Billy Goldenberg; Buddy Kaye; Ben Weisman
- Production company: NBC Productions
- Distributed by: Universal Pictures
- Release date: November 10, 1969 (USA)
- Running time: 93 minutes
- Country: United States
- Language: English
- Budget: $2,000,000
- Box office: $4,000,000

Change of Habit is a 1969 American crime drama musical film directed by William A. Graham, and starring Elvis Presley and Mary Tyler Moore. Written by James Lee, S.S. Schweitzer, and Eric Bercovici, based on a story by John Joseph and Richard Morris, the film is about three Catholic nuns, preparing for their final vows, who are sent to a rough inner city neighborhood dressed as lay missionaries to work at a clinic run by John Carpenter, a young doctor. Their lives become complicated by the realities they face in the inner city, and by Carpenter who falls in love with Sister Michelle Gallagher, one of the nuns.

The film was produced by Joe Connelly for NBC Productions and distributed by Universal Pictures. Filmed on location in the Los Angeles area and at Universal Studios during March and April 1969, Change of Habit was released in the United States on November 10, 1969. It spent four weeks on the Variety Box Office Survey and peaked at #17 among the year's highest-grossing films.

Change of Habit was Elvis Presley's 31st and final film acting role and stars as a professional man for the only time in his career. There was interest in this film being a major Academy Awards contender, but Presley's manager Colonel Tom Parker knew the Academy of Motion Picture Arts and Sciences' bias against Presley ensured it was not considered. He famously said "Don't go buying no tuxedoes."

Change of Habit is considered to be among Presley's best films and it has been praised for how it dealt with inner city problems in ways that had never been seen in a Hollywood film. It was also the first Hollywood film to deal with autism. Presley's remaining film appearances were in concert documentaries, although he was working on the film The New Gladiators at the time of his death.

This film was Mary Tyler Moore's fourth and final film under her Universal Pictures contract; she did not appear in another theatrical movie until Ordinary People in 1980. Moore and Edward Asner, who also appears in the film playing police officer Lt. Moretti, went on to star in The Mary Tyler Moore Show, which premiered in September of the following year. In this film, however, Moore and Asner shared no scenes together.

== Plot ==
Dr. John Carpenter heads a clinic serving an underprivileged community in a major metropolis with an ethnic Puerto Rican population. He is surprised to be offered assistance by three women. Unknown to him, the three are nuns in street clothing who want to aid the community but are afraid the local residents might be reluctant to seek help if their true identities were known. The nuns are also facing opposition from the rude and arrogant priest Father Gibbons from the local parish. Dr. Carpenter and the nuns are shown dealing with non-verbal autistic girl Amanda, severely stuttering teenager Julio Hernandez and a man beaten by loan shark enforcers. The nuns at times are sexually harassed by loiterers and one nun, Sister Michelle Gallagher, suffers as an attempted rape.

Dr. Carpenter falls for Sister Michelle but her true vocation remains unknown to him. She also has feelings for Dr. Carpenter but is reluctant to leave the order. The film concludes with Sister Michelle and Sister Irene entering a church where Dr. Carpenter is singing to pray for guidance to make her choice.

== Cast ==
- Elvis Presley as Dr. John Carpenter
- Mary Tyler Moore as Sister Michelle Gallagher
- Barbara McNair as Sister Irene Hawkins
- Jane Elliot as Sister Barbara Bennett
- Leora Dana as Mother Joseph
- Ed Asner as Lieutenant Moretti
- Robert Emhardt as The Banker
- Regis Toomey as Father Gibbons
- Doro Merande as Rose
- Ruth McDevitt as Lily
- Richard Carlson as Bishop Finley
- Nefti Millet as Julio Hernandez
- Laura Figueroa as Desiree
- Lorena Kirk as Amanda
- Virginia Vincent as Miss Parker
- David Renard as Colom
- Ji-Tu Cumbuka as "Hawk"
- William Elliott as Robbie
- Rodolfo Hoyos Jr. as Mr. Hernandez
- Timothy Carey as Manager
- Stella Garcia as Maria
- Pepe Hern as Man
- Darlene Love as Backup Singer
- A Martinez as Teen
- Lenny Montana as Grocer
- Charlie Hodge as Patient

== Production ==
By 1969, Elvis Presley's future in Hollywood was under threat. Although still financially successful, mainly due to the "make 'em quick, make 'em cheap" attitude of Presley's manager Colonel Tom Parker, Presley's films had been making less profit in recent years. When Parker had struggled to find any studio willing to pay Presley's usual $1,000,000 fee, he struck a deal with NBC to produce one feature film, and a TV special entitled Elvis. NBC would pay Presley $1,250,000 million for both features, and Parker was happy in the knowledge that he was still able to earn $1,000,000 for his client.

The film Change of Habit had been announced in 1967, with Mary Tyler Moore signing up in October 1968. It was considered a Moore vehicle until January 1969 when Presley signed on to take the lead role. Although set in New York City, the film was shot in the Los Angeles area and at the Universal Studios lot during March and April 1969. It was released nationwide in the United States on November 10, 1969.

In the film, the character of Amanda (Lorena Kirk), a young autistic child, is believed to be the first portrayal of autism in a film by name. It accurately portrays the common misdiagnosis of deafness and once Amanda's autism is defined, she is treated with a therapy that was then quite common: Rage Reduction therapy, also known as Attachment therapy. This treatment has since fallen out of favor, now considered pseudoscientific. Indeed, the scene was supervised by Robert Zaslow, known as the father of rage reduction therapy. Zaslow is credited as an additional member of the film's crew as "(supervisor: rage reduction scene - as Dr. Robert W. Zaslow)" In an era when Folk Mass was just catching on, Presley's Dr. John Carpenter character is seen playing guitar and singing "Let Us Pray" in an early depiction of folk music at Mass.

Moore and Edward Asner would soon become co-stars of her self-named The Mary Tyler Moore Show, one of television's enduring hits from 1970 to 77. In Change of Habit, however, they shared no scenes. In 1973, four years after Change of Habit, the issue of mass with guitar and off-duty nuns without habits would again be brought up in All in the Family episode "Edith's Conversion."

By the time Change of Habit was released, Presley was experiencing one of the greatest years of any singer-turned-actor in music and film history. Between December 1968 and December 1969, Presley starred in three hit films at the box office, he starred in the top rated television special of the year Elvis, he scored three top-ten singles including the number one "Suspicious Minds" and "In the Ghetto", had three hit albums including the legendary From Elvis in Memphis and became the number one live act in Las Vegas. In 1969 alone, Presley made more than $7,000,000 from films, records, television and personal appearances, which equates to over $59,000,000 adjusted for inflation.

After Change of Habit, Presley next co-wrote and produced his own film, The New Gladiators, which was unfinished at the time of his death. This dream project would have featured Presley starring as a karate cop in a role that showed off his skills as a martial artist. He was also asked by Barbra Streisand to star in her remake of A Star is Born but Parker wanted to ensure Presley got top billing and a $1,000,000 salary before agreeing. No agreement happened. As of October 2025, Jane Elliot, who played Sister Barbara Bennett, is the last surviving main cast member still living.

== Reception ==
A. H. Weiler of The New York Times reviewed the film on a double bill with House of Cards and noted that both were "merely exemplary of professional technique and dialogue rather than memorable characterization and emotion." Variety wrote that "its intriguing idea has a well-enough-constructed plotline to flesh out its premise for good family fare ... Presley displays his customary easy presence." Kevin Thomas of the Los Angeles Times wrote, "Today we're simply too much aware how agonizing social injustices can be for them to be treated with the breezy, jaunty touch of simple-minded light comedy ... to watch all this frantically bouncy, thoroughly bogus business is as discomforting as listening to chalk screech across a blackboard."

Change of Habit holds a 10% rating on Rotten Tomatoes based on ten reviews, making it Presley's worst-received film on the site.

== Soundtrack ==
When Presley entered Decca Universal Studio on March 5, 1969, for two days to record his final motion picture soundtrack, what would come to be known as the comeback television special had already been broadcast, its attendant album Elvis had been his first top ten LP on the Billboard 200 in four years, and he had just finished the sessions at American Sound Studio yielding From Elvis in Memphis and the top ten singles "In the Ghetto" and "Suspicious Minds" that would cement his resurgence as a force in American popular music. He had a month-long engagement at the International Hotel in Paradise, Nevada lined up in August, his first live performances in eight years, and had turned his career around.

A song recorded at American, "Rubberneckin'", would be used in the film and subsequently issued as the b-side of RCA single 47-9768 "Don't Cry Daddy" in conjunction with the movie premiere. Four songs would be recorded at the soundtrack sessions, of which "Let's Be Friends" would not be used in the film. The four songs would be released commercially on budget albums, "Let's Be Friends", the title track "Change of Habit", and "Have a Happy" on Let's Be Friends the following year, with "Let Us Pray" issued on the 1971 album You'll Never Walk Alone.

Some reference sources erroneously list an outtake from the earlier Presley film, Charro!, "Let's Forget About the Stars" (a song also released on the Let's Be Friends album), as being a song recorded for Change of Habit.

=== Personnel ===
- Elvis Presley - vocals / piano (played live)
- The Blossoms - backing vocals
- B.J. Baker, Sally Stevens, Jackie Ward - backing vocals
- Howard Roberts, Dennis Budimir, Mike Deasy, Robert Bain - electric guitar
- Roger Kellaway - piano
- Joe Mondragon, Lyle Ritz, Max Bennett - double bass
- Carol Kaye - electric bass
- Carl O'Brien - drums

=== Film music track listing ===
1. "Change of Habit" (Buddy Kaye and Ben Weisman)
2. "Let's Be Friends" (Chris Arnold, David Martin, Geoffrey Morrow) (not used in film)
3. "Let Us Pray" (Buddy Kaye and Ben Weisman)
4. "Have a Happy" (Buddy Kaye, Dolores Fuller, Ben Weisman)
5. "Rubberneckin'" (Dory Jones and Bunny Warren) (Not initially recorded for the film, but added to the soundtrack and performed by Presley on camera)

== See also ==
- List of American films of 1969
- Elvis Presley on film and television
- List of hood films
- Elvis Presley discography
