= From Elvis in Memphis =

Studio album by Elvis Presley
- Released: June 2, 1969
- Recorded: January – February 1969
- Studio: American Sound (Memphis)
- Genres: Rock; soul; country; blues
- Length: 36:42
- Label: RCA Victor
- Producers: Chips Moman; Felton Jarvis

Elvis Presley chronology
Elvis (1968)	From Elvis in Memphis (1969)	From Memphis to Vegas / From Vegas to Memphis (1969)

Singles from From Elvis in Memphis
- 1. "In the Ghetto" Released: April 14, 1969

From Elvis in Memphis is the tenth studio album by American singer Elvis Presley. It was released by RCA Records on June 2, 1969. It was recorded at American Sound Studio in Memphis in January and February 1969 under the direction of producer Chips Moman and backed by its house band, informally known as the Memphis Boys. Following the success of Presley's TV special Elvis and its soundtrack, the album marked Presley's return to non-soundtrack albums after the completion of his film contract with Metro-Goldwyn-Mayer (MGM).

Presley's entourage convinced him to leave the RCA studios and record this album at American Sound, a Memphis studio at the peak of a hit-producing streak. The reason was for the southern soul sound of the aforementioned group going by the name of Memphis Boys. The predominance of country songs among those recorded in these sessions gave them the feel of the "country soul" style. This impression was emphasized by the frequent use of the dobro in the arrangements.

From Elvis in Memphis was released in June 1969 to favorable reviews and attracted international attention. It reached number 13 on the Billboard 200, number two on the country charts and number one in the United Kingdom, and its single "In the Ghetto" reached number three on the Billboard Hot 100. It was certified gold by the Recording Industry Association of America (RIAA) in 1970. In later years, it garnered further favorable reviews, which included the release being ranked number 190 on Rolling Stone's 2003 list of the 500 greatest albums of all time.

== Background ==
In 1960, after Presley returned from military service, his manager, Colonel Tom Parker, shifted the direction of his career from live performances and studio recordings to acting in motion pictures and recording their accompanying soundtracks. In March 1961, Presley performed his last live concert for eight years: a benefit for the construction of the USS Arizona Memorial at Bloch Arena in Pearl Harbor, Hawaii. During the first half of the 1960s, three of Presley's soundtrack albums reached number one on the pop charts and a number of his most popular songs were from his films, including "Can't Help Falling in Love" (1961) and "Return to Sender" (1962).

After 1964, Parker decided that Presley should only record soundtrack albums. He viewed the films and soundtracks as complementary, with each helping to promote the other. However, as the quality and commercial success of his films and soundtracks steadily diminished, Presley became increasingly disappointed and frustrated with the quality of his work. From 1964 to 1968, Presley had just one top-ten hit: "Crying in the Chapel" (1965), a gospel song recorded in 1960. During this period, only one album of new material by Presley was issued: the gospel collection How Great Thou Art (1967), which won Presley his first Grammy Award for Best Sacred Performance.

In 1968, Parker arranged a deal with NBC for a Christmas television special starring Presley in front of a live audience. Parker originally planned to have Presley sing Christmas carols only, but the producer, Steve Binder, convinced Presley to perform songs from his original repertoire. The high ratings received by the NBC special and its accompanying RCA Victor LP re-established Presley's popularity. During the making of the special, Presley said to Binder: "I'll never sing another song that I don't believe in, I'm never going to make another movie that I don't believe in." As part of his decision to concentrate on music rather than films, Presley decided to record a new album.

== Recording ==
Presley left his usual musicians and studios (Radio Recorders in Hollywood, California and RCA Studio B in Nashville, Tennessee), recording new material in Memphis. After the special he approached Scotty Moore and D. J. Fontana, who had played with Presley during his early hit-making career, and who rejoined him on the television show. Presley asked Moore about using Music City Recorders in Nashville, but that suggestion never came to fruition.

During a January 1969 meeting at Graceland, Presley told RCA Victor producer, Felton Jarvis, that he did not want to record his next album at RCA Studios. Two of Presley's friends, DJ George Klein and Marty Lacker, suggested that he use American Sound Studio, an up-and-coming studio with which Lacker was involved. RCA contacted the studio's producer Chips Moman. Willing to work with Presley, Moman postponed a session with Neil Diamond after being asked to produce the sessions with Felton Jarvis as second producer. It was agreed that Presley's recordings would take ten days and cost $25,000. He would be backed by the studio's house band, the 827 Thomas Street Band (informally known as the Memphis Boys), which consisted of Reggie Young on guitar, Tommy Cogbill and Mike Leech on bass, Gene Chrisman on drums, Bobby Wood on piano, and Bobby Emmons on organ.

Although at that time, RCA Records company policy was to record only in their own studios, the label sent their personnel to American Sound. Recording began on January 13, 1969, when Presley arrived at the studio nursing a cold. In addition to his personal entourage, Presley was accompanied by Hill & Range publisher Freddy Bienstock, Colonel Parker's assistant Tom Diskin, producer Felton Jarvis, executive Harry Jenkins and engineer Al Pachucki, representing RCA Records. With Pachucki on the board, American Sound engineer Ed Kollis joined the musicians on harmonica. The session, which produced recordings of "Long Black Limousine", "Wearin' That Loved On Look" and several non-album songs, continued until 5:00 am. After the first day's recording, Moman and his colleagues expressed discomfort with the size of Presley's entourage, and Presley was accompanied by fewer people for the remaining sessions.

The next day Presley recorded "I'm Moving On" and "Gentle on My Mind", leaving the studio while working on the latter to rest his throat. The following night, he did not appear, as his cold worsened, and on January 15 and 16 the house band recorded backing tracks for subsequent sessions. Presley returned on January 20, recording "In the Ghetto" in 23 takes and finishing the vocal track for "Gentle on My Mind". On January 22, he recorded Eddy Arnold's "I'll Hold You in My Heart (Till I Can Hold You in My Arms)" and the non-album single "Suspicious Minds". Presley then took a break from recording for a vacation trip to Aspen, Colorado to celebrate his daughter Lisa Marie's first birthday.

During Presley's absence, Moman was approached by Bienstock, who was concerned about possible future disputes concerning the songs' publication. Moman and Presley decided not to record Hill & Range compositions, instead using songs by American Sound writers. Bienstock, particularly interested in the non-album "Suspicious Minds" and "Mama Liked the Roses", warned that Moman would have to surrender the publishing rights to release the songs. In response, Moman told Bienstock to take all the recordings and leave the studio. RCA Records vice-president Harry Jenkins interceded, siding with Moman and ordering Bienstock to stay away from the studio and let Presley work with the staff. Meanwhile, Diskin informed Presley about the publishing issues. Presley supported Moman, assuring Diskin that he and the producer would handle the session work. Diskin contacted Parker, who told him to return to California. Moman retained the publishing rights, and the sessions were scheduled to resume several weeks later.

Presley returned on February 17, recording "True Love Travels on a Gravel Road" and "Power of My Love", and Eddy Arnold's "After Loving You" and "Do You Know Who I Am?" the following day. On February 19, he devoted most of the session to the non-album single "Kentucky Rain", one of the few Hill & Range songs used on the American Sound recordings. Presley followed with a recording of "Only the Strong Survive", a hit for Jerry Butler the previous year, which took twenty-nine takes. On February 20, he recorded Johnny Tillotson's "It Keeps Right on a Hurtin'" in three takes and "Any Day Now" in six. Presley's final session was on February 22, when he recorded vocal overdubs for "True Love Travels on a Gravel Road" and "Power of My Love" and vocals for several non-album cuts. The following month, Mike Leech and Glenn Spreen began work on the string and horn overdubs to finish the album; several brass overdubs were recorded by the Memphis Horns.

== Music ==
Moman moved away from the usual Presley pop recordings aimed at an established audience. A developer of the Stax Records sound, he incorporated a Memphis sound integrating soul, country, gospel and rural and electric blues. Many arrangements lean heavily on the rhythm section, with lesser contributions from strings, brass and woodwinds. Arrangers Glenn Spreen and Mike Leech changed Presley's image on the tracks with the addition of violas, cellos and French horns. The arrangers intended to blend the tracks for a distinctive sound; the strings are used in counterpoint, rising when the track fades and vice versa. The violas play the same lines as the French horns, with cello used for darker tones. Syncopation was incorporated by bowing.

"Wearin' That Loved on Look"
The first track on side one introduces Memphis soul, with a bass lead used for the first time on a Presley recording.

"Power of My Love"
The opening track of side two features lyrics full of sexual innuendo.

The twelve tracks on the album were selected from thirty-four which were recorded in the American Sound sessions. The first song, "Wearin' That Loved On Look" features an electric bass lead for the first time in a Presley recording. The second is "Only the Strong Survive", with Presley backed by bass and drums. He plays piano on the third track, the country song "I Hold You in My Heart ('Till I Can Hold You in My Arms)". Presley's voice is roughened by a cold on the fourth song, the country-rhythm-and-blues "Long Black Limousine" featuring a trumpet solo. The fifth song, Johnny Tillotson's traditional country-western "It Keeps Right on A-Hurtin'", was arranged to sound more like Memphis soul. Side one ends with a version of Hank Snow's country-western "I'm Moving On" with a strong bass line and driving rhythm.

Side two begins with Florence Kaye and Bernie Baum's "Power of My Love". The song has a blues-based sound, with Presley backed by a brass section, drums, an electric guitar, and organ. The lyrics include double entendres ("Crush it, kick it / You can never win / I know baby you can't lick it/ I'll make you give in)", with groans by backing female singers emphasizing sexuality. The second track, a cover of John Hartford's "Gentle on My Mind" follows. The string-laden arrangement was inspired by Glen Campbell's 1967 Grammy-winning version of the song. The next song, Eddy Arnold's 1962 hit "After Loving You", is arranged in a 12/8 tempo. Elvis plays guitar throughout the song including the intro. This is followed by Dallas Frazier's "True Love Travels on a Gravel Road" and Chuck Jackson's 1962 hit, "Any Day Now".

The twelfth and final song of the album, selected as a single, is "In The Ghetto", written by Mac Davis. The song was chosen by Billy Strange, who had previously picked material for other Presley sessions. The protest song denounces the consequences of poverty, with compassion for inner-city youth. Because of "In the Ghetto"'s lyrics, controversial for its time, Presley originally did not plan to record the song because he thought it might alienate fans. After Moman said he might give the song to Rosey Grier, Presley's friends convinced him to record it.

The album cover is a still from the "Trouble"-"Guitar Man" production number of NBC's Elvis special. Presley is featured with a red electric guitar, wearing a black leather suit with a red scarf around his neck, with silhouettes of guitar players at the back of the set. From Elvis in Memphis became one of American Sound Studio's best-known productions, with Dusty Springfield's Dusty in Memphis; both albums reflected similar times and musical trends on the Memphis scene.

== Release and reception ==
The single "In the Ghetto" was released on April 14, 1969, with 300,000 copies shipped by RCA. In its second week after release, it entered the charts, where it remained for thirteen weeks (reaching number three on June 14). The single sold a million copies in the United States. Meanwhile, it reached number two on the British Singles chart. However, its success triggered a confrontation between RCA and American Sound. During the sessions, Presley's usual producer, Jarvis, grew increasingly worried about losing control of Presley and his recordings. During its first two weeks on the chart, "In the Ghetto"'s production was credited to Jarvis. Lacker then called Billboard and had them correct the producer credit to Moman. During the fourth week, Parker asked Billboard to remove the production credit from the song's entry entirely (arguing that Presley's records did not traditionally list a producer credit).

Professional ratings
Review scores
Source	Rating
AllMusic	5/5 stars
MusicHound Rock	4.5/5 stars
PopMatters	9/10 stars
The Rolling Stone Album Guide	5/5 stars
The Rough Guide to Elvis	5/5 stars
Sputnikmusic	5/5 stars

From Elvis in Memphis was released on June 2, 1969. The album topped the UK Albums Chart, disposing for one week Jethro Tull's Stand Up. In the United States, it reached number thirteen on Billboard's Top LPs, and was ranked number seventeen on the magazine's Top Country albums of 1969. By January 28, 1970, it was certified gold by the Recording Industry Association of America after selling over 500,000 copies.

On July 12, 1969, Presley was featured on the cover of Rolling Stone, with the album receiving the lead review. Peter Guralnick, the magazine's reviewer, described it as "great ... Flatly and unequivocally the equal of anything (Presley) has ever done" and praised the "evident passion which (Presley) has invested in this music", adding: "(he) is trying, and trying very hard, to please us. He needs to have our attention ... It is his involvement after all which comes as the surprise." Billboard also published a positive review, saying that Presley had "never sounded better, and the choice of material is perfect". High Fidelity wrote, "Elvis has been through a number of stages, and his latest is the best".

The Los Angeles Times delivered a mixed review: Critic Pete Johnson praised Presley's voice, which he considered had gone back "down to grittiness". Meanwhile, Johnson criticized the music arrangements that he considered inconsistent with the original Sun Records style of Presley, or the contemporary Memphis Sound produced by Stax Records. He pointed that the rhythm section "rarely gets off the ground", called the use of the horns "scarse and generally insipid", the arrangements "Hollywoodish", and he attributed to "laziness" the production of the more scarcely backed tracks to Moman and arrangers Spreen and Leech. Johnson concluded that Presley's voice had "arrived in Memphis" but "no one else concerned with the LP did". For the Associated Press, the album presented "quality country" and Presley's voice featured "depth" and "feeling". The Pittsburgh Press felt that it was a "typical" Presley album that featured a "rock 'n' roll style" that later morphed into "love portions". Detroit Free Press considered that Presley's style appeared "brand new" in From Elvis in Memphis that featured lyrics that were "country hip" and a beat that was "1969 all the way".

From Elvis in Memphis has continued to receive praise in retrospective reviews. In 2009 Rolling Stone described it as "extraordinary" and attributed the sessions' success to Presley's "newfound maturity and soulfulness" and Moman's "warm, distinctly Southern musical backing". AllMusic gives it five stars out of five, and highlights it as an "AllMusic album pick". Critic Bruce Eder said that together with 1956's Elvis Presley, From Elvis in Memphis was Presley's "greatest album". Eder called it "one of the greatest white soul albums (and one of the greatest soul albums) ever cut", with Presley "rejuvenated artistically (while) he's supported by the best playing and backup singing of his entire recording history". Richie Unterberger of the same website cited the album as a return to rock music for Elvis and called it "reasonably gutsy late-'60s pop/rock".

PopMatters has described From Elvis in Memphis as "some of the best music Elvis Presley ever made". Sputnik Music's reviewer considered that the album "rivaled" Presley's early recordings in "terms of historical importance and innovation", and was "downright essential, for any Elvis fan and for any music fan".

== Legacy ==
Following the American Sound sessions, Presley returned to Hollywood. Between March–April 1969, he recorded the soundtrack and starred in his thirty-first and last motion picture as an actor, Change of Habit.

When the album was due for release, Parker arranged Presley's return to performing live. He made a deal with Kirk Kerkorian, owner of the Las Vegas International Hotel, to play the newly built 2,000-seat showroom for four weeks (two shows per night, with Mondays off) for $400,000. For his appearance, he assembled a band later known as the TCB Band: James Burton (guitar), John Wilkinson (rhythm guitar), Jerry Scheff (bass-guitar), Ronnie Tutt (drums), Larry Muhoberac (piano) and Charlie Hodge (rhythm guitar, background vocals). The band was complemented by the backing vocals of the Sweet inspirations and the Imperials. His initial Las Vegas show attracted an audience of 101,500, setting a new Vegas performance record. In 1970, Presley began to tour the United States for the first time in thirteen years.

"Don't Cry Daddy" reached No. 6 on the Billboard Hot 100. "Kentucky Rain" was a moderate hit in 1970, reaching No. 16, but "Suspicious Minds" became one of Presley's signature songs and was the final chart-topper of his career.

In 2003, From Elvis in Memphis was number 190 on Rolling Stone's list of the 500 greatest albums of all time, maintaining the rating in a 2012 revised list, then dropping to number 322 in a 2020 revised list.

== Reissues ==
RCA first reissued the original 12 track album on compact disc in 1991. In 2000, RCA released a remastered CD of From Elvis in Memphis, including six bonus tracks (released as A- or B-sides) recorded during the album sessions. The reissue received five stars out of five from Rolling Stone. In 2009, a Legacy RCA Edition of the album was released for its 40th anniversary: two discs (From Elvis In Memphis and the studio disk of From Memphis To Vegas/From Vegas To Memphis), four outtakes and ten tracks originally released as monaural singles (including "Suspicious Minds" and "Kentucky Rain"). In 2013, From Elvis in Memphis was reissued on the Follow That Dream label in a special two-disc edition that contained the original album tracks along with numerous alternate takes. The 1970 Quadraphonic mix on eight-track tape has never been reissued.

== Track listing ==
=== Original release ===
Side one
No.	Title	Writer(s)	Recording date	Length
1.	"Wearin' That Loved On Look"	Dallas Frazier, A. L. Owens	January 13, 1969	2:47
2.	"Only the Strong Survive"	Jerry Butler, Kenny Gamble, Leon Huff	February 19, 1969	2:46
3.	"I'll Hold You in My Heart (Till I Can Hold You in My Arms)"	Eddy Arnold, Thomas Dilbeck, Hal Horton	January 22, 1969	4:34
4.	"Long Black Limousine"	Bobby George, Vern Stovall	January 13, 1969	3:44
5.	"It Keeps Right On A-Hurtin'"	Johnny Tillotson	February 20, 1969	2:38
6.	"I'm Movin' On"	Hank Snow	January 14, 1969	2:50

Side two
No.	Title	Writer(s)	Recording date	Length
7.	"Power of My Love"	Bernie Baum, Bill Giant, Florence Kaye	February 18, 1969	2:37
8.	"Gentle on My Mind"	John Hartford	January 14, 1969	3:22
9.	"After Loving You"	Johnny Lantz, Eddie Miller	February 18, 1969	3:09
10.	"True Love Travels on a Gravel Road"	Dallas Frazier, A. L. Owens	February 17, 1969	2:38
11.	"Any Day Now"	Burt Bacharach, Bob Hilliard	February 20, 1969	2:56
12.	"In the Ghetto"	Mac Davis	January 20, 1969	2:47

2000 reissue bonus tracks
No.	Title	Writer(s)	Recording date	Length
13.	"The Fair Is Moving On"	Guy Fletcher, Doug Flett	February 21, 1969	3:08
14.	"Suspicious Minds"	Mark James	January 22, 1969	4:29
15.	"You'll Think of Me"	Mort Shuman	January 14, 1969	4:00
16.	"Don't Cry Daddy"	Mac Davis	January 15, 1969	2:48
17.	"Kentucky Rain"	Eddie Rabbitt, Dick Heard	February 19, 1969	3:14
18.	"Mama Liked the Roses"	Johnny Christopher	January 15, 1969	2:47

=== 2009 CD reissue ===
Disc one
No.	Title	Length
1.	"Wearin' That Loved On Look"	2:46
2.	"Only the Strong Survive"	2:42
3.	"I'll Hold You in My Heart (Till I Can Hold You in My Arms)"	4:32
4.	"Long Black Limousine"	3:42
5.	"It Keeps Right On A-Hurtin'"	2:36
6.	"I'm Movin' On"	2:53
7.	"Power of My Love"	2:38
8.	"Gentle on My Mind"	3:22
9.	"After Loving You"	3:05
10.	"True Love Travels on a Gravel Road"	2:38
11.	"Any Day Now"	3:00
12.	"In the Ghetto"	2:47
13.	"I'll Be There"	2:25
14.	"Hey Jude"	4:31
15.	"If I'm a Fool (For Loving You)"	2:44
16.	"Who Am I?"	3:18

Disc two
No.	Title	Length
1.	"Inherit the Wind"	2:56
2.	"This Is the Story"	2:29
3.	"Stranger in My Own Home Town"	4:24
4.	"A Little Bit of Green"	3:21
5.	"And the Grass Won't Pay No Mind"	3:10
6.	"Do You Know Who I Am"	2:49
7.	"From a Jack to a King"	2:24
8.	"The Fair Is Moving On"	3:09
9.	"You'll Think of Me"	4:01
10.	"Without Love (There Is Nothing)"	2:53
11.	"In The Ghetto" (single mix)	2:50
12.	"Any Day Now" (single mix)	2:56
13.	"The Fair Is Moving On" (single mix)	3:10
14.	"Suspicious Minds"	4:29
15.	"You'll Think of Me" (single mix)	4:36
16.	"Don't Cry Daddy"	2:45
17.	"Rubberneckin'"	2:12
18.	"Kentucky Rain"	3:27
19.	"My Little Friend"	2:51
20.	"Mama Liked the Roses"	2:41

== Personnel ==
- Elvis Presley – vocals, guitar, piano on "I'll Hold You In My Heart (Till I Can Hold You In My Arms)"
- Ed Kollis – harmonica on "Power of My Love" and "True Love Travels on a Gravel Road"
- John Hughey – pedal steel guitar (on "In the Ghetto")
- Reggie Young – lead guitar, electric sitar
- Bobby Wood – piano
- Bobby Emmons – Hammond organ
- Tommy Cogbill – bass guitar
- Mike Leech – bass guitar, string and horn arrangements
- Gene Chrisman – drums
- Glen Spreen – string and horn arrangements

Overdubbed

- Wayne Jackson – trumpet
- Dick Steff – trumpet
- R.F. Taylor – trumpet
- Ed Logan – trombone
- Jack Hale – trombone
- Gerald Richardson – trombone
- Tony Cason – French horn
- Joe D'Gerolamo – French horn
- Andrew Love – saxophone
- Jackie Thomas – saxophone
- Glen Spreen – saxophone
- J.P. Luper – saxophone
- Joe Babcock – backing vocals
- Dolores Edgin – backing vocals
- Mary Greene – backing vocals
- Charlie Hodge – backing vocals
- Ginger Holladay – backing vocals
- Mary Holladay – backing vocals
- Millie Kirkham – backing vocals
- Ronnie Milsap – backing vocals
- Sonja Montgomery – backing vocals
- June Page – backing vocals
- Susan Pilkington – backing vocals
- Sandy Posey – backing vocals
- Donna Thatcher – backing vocals
- Hurschel Wiginton – backing vocals

== Charts ==
Chart	Peak position
1969
Australian Albums Chart	5
Belgium Albums Top 50	3
Canadian Top 50 Albums	10
French Top Albums	9
German Albums Chart	4
Greece Top 75 Albums Chart	6
Netherlands Top 100 Albums	10
Norwegian Top 40 Albums	1
UK Albums Chart	1
US Billboard 200	13
US Country Albums	2
2009
Belgium (Wallonia) 100 Albums	47
US Top Pop Catalog Albums	29

== Certifications ==
Region	Certification	Certified units/sales
United States (RIAA)	Gold	500,000^{^}
^{^} Shipments figures based on certification alone.

== Release history ==
Region	Date	Label	Format	Catalog
North America	May 20, 1969	RCA Victor	stereo LP	LSP-4155
North America	May 20, 1969	RCA Victor	Stereo 8	P8S-1456
United Kingdom	June 1969	RCA Victor	stereo LP	SF 8029
North America	December 1970	RCA Victor	Quadraphonic 8-track	PQ8-1456
North America	1970	RCA Victor	cassette	PK-1456
Various	May 16, 2000	RCA Records	CD	07863 67932 2
Worldwide reissue	July 28, 2009	RCA Records/Legacy Recordings	double CD	88697 51497 2
Europe	2013	Follow That Dream Records	double CD	506020-975047
