= Live in Las Vegas (Elvis Presley album) =

Box set by Elvis Presley
- Released: July 10, 2001
- Recorded: 1956, 1969, 1970, 1972, 1974, 1975
- Genre: Rock and roll
- Length: 4:29:34
- Label: RCA

Elvis Presley chronology
Peace in the Valley: The Complete Gospel Recordings (2000)	Live in Las Vegas (2001)	Today, Tomorrow, and Forever (2002)

Live in Las Vegas is a four-disc box set by American singer and musician Elvis Presley, released in July 2001 on RCA Records, catalogue 07863 69354-2. It comprises live recordings from shows given by Presley in Las Vegas through every decade of his career.

== Content ==
Disc one comprises a complete show from August 24, 1969, and disc two a complete show from August 11, 1970. Discs three and four present recordings from shows over a time span from 1956 through 1975, not in chronological order.

In his review of the album, music critic Lindsay Planer stated:

A vibrant and overwhelmingly energetic Presley is the focus of the first two discs - containing complete performances from August 24, 1969, and August 11, 1970, respectively. As one may well anticipate, the sets feature a healthy sampling of Presley's voluminous back catalogue. "Hound Dog", "Heartbreak Hotel", "Love Me Tender", and "I Got a Woman" are given a workout during each performance. As were the more current hits such as "Suspicious Minds", "In the Ghetto", and "Can't Help Falling in Love". Presley's knack for inimitable remakes is also displayed as he gains inspiration from concurrent chart-toppers such as "Hey Jude", "Bridge over Troubled Water", and "Polk Salad Annie". Unlike the first two discs, the final pair do not contain complete performances and likewise are not presented chronologically. For the sake of contrast, the four song mini-set documenting the final performance of Presley's first Vegas stand on May 6, 1956, begins disc four. What remains consistent - in both the brief 1956 set as well as on the remainder of the mid-'70s recordings - is Presley's impeccable taste in cover material.

== Track listing ==
Disc one - August 24, 1969
No.	Title	Writer(s)	Length
1.	"Blue Suede Shoes"	Carl Perkins	2:37
2.	"I Got A Woman"	Ray Charles, Renald Richard	2:55
3.	"All Shook Up"	Otis Blackwell	1:49
4.	"Elvis welcomes the audience"	—	1:48
5.	"Love Me Tender"	Vera Matson	2:37
6.	"Jailhouse Rock" / "Don't Be Cruel" (medley)	Jerry Leiber, Mike Stoller / Otis Blackwell	2:37
7.	"Heartbreak Hotel"	Mae Boren Axton, Tommy Durden	2:01
8.	"Hound Dog"	Jerry Leiber, Mike Stoller	3:22
9.	"I Can't Stop Loving You"	Don Gibson	2:42
10.	"Johnny B. Goode"	Chuck Berry	3:15
11.	"Baby What You Want Me to Do"	Jimmy Reed	2:37
12.	"Runaway"	Max Crook, Del Shannon	2:16
13.	"Are You Lonesome Tonight?"	Lou Handman, Roy Turk	3:03
14.	"Yesterday" / "Hey Jude" (medley)	John Lennon, Paul McCartney	4:06
15.	"Introductions"	—	2:34
16.	"In the Ghetto"	Mac Davis	2:47
17.	"Suspicious Minds"	Mark James	6:32
18.	"What'd I Say"	Ray Charles	3:47
19.	"Can't Help Falling in Love"	Luigi Creatore, Hugo Peretti, George David Weiss	2:08
20.	"Elvis talks about his career"	—	6:41
Total length:			1:02:14

Disc two - August 11, 1970
No.	Title	Writer(s)	Length
1.	"That's All Right"	Arthur "Big Boy" Crudup	2:47
2.	"I Got A Woman"	Ray Charles, Renald Richard	2:34
3.	"Hound Dog"	Jerry Leiber, Mike Stoller	3:59
4.	"Love Me Tender"	Vera Matson	2:56
5.	"There Goes My Everything"	Dallas Frazier	3:56
6.	"Just Pretend"	Guy Fletcher, Doug Flett	4:18
7.	"Just Can't Help Believin'"	Barry Mann, Cynthia Weil	4:53
8.	"Something"	George Harrison	3:38
9.	"Men with Broken Hearts"	Hank Williams	0:40
10.	"Walk A Mile In My Shoes"	Joe South	2:12
11.	"You've Lost That Lovin' Feelin'"	Barry Mann, Phil Spector, Cynthia Weil	5:32
12.	"Polk Salad Annie"	Tony Joe White	5:10
13.	"One Night"	Dave Bartholomew, Pearl King, Anita Steiman	2:00
14.	"Don't Be Cruel"	Otis Blackwell	1:34
15.	"Love Me"	Jerry Leiber, Mike Stoller	1:56
16.	"Instrumental vamp"	—	0:58
17.	"Heartbreak Hotel"	Mae Boren Axton, Tommy Durden	2:19
18.	"Introductions"	—	2:25
19.	"Bridge Over Troubled Water"	Paul Simon	4:14
20.	"Suspicious Minds"	Mark James	6:05
21.	"Can't Help Falling In Love"	Luigi Creatore, Hugo Peretti, George David Weiss	2:07
22.	"When the Snow Is on the Roses"	Ernst Bader, Larry Kusik, Eddie Snyder	1:27
Total length:			1:07:40

Disc three
No.	Title	Writer(s)	Recording date	Length
1.	"See See Rider"	Traditional	February 18, 1970	2:33
2.	"Release Me"	Eddie Miller, Robert Yount	February 18, 1970	3:09
3.	"Sweet Caroline"	Neil Diamond	February 16, 1970	2:51
4.	"The Wonder of You"	Baker Knight	February 18, 1970	2:35
5.	"Polk Salad Annie"	Tony Joe White	February 18, 1970	4:42
6.	"Proud Mary"	John Fogerty	February 16, 1970	2:46
7.	"Walk A Mile In My Shoes"	Joe South	February 19, 1970	2:49
8.	"In the Ghetto"	Mac Davis	February 19, 1970	2:45
9.	"Let It Be Me"	Gilbert Bécaud, Manny Curtis, Pierre Delanoë	February 17, 1970	3:23
10.	"Don't Cry Daddy"	Mac Davis	February 17, 1970	2:59
11.	"Kentucky Rain"	Dick Heard, Eddie Rabbitt	February 17, 1970	3:53
12.	"Long Tall Sally"	Robert Blackwell, Enotris Johnson, Richard Penniman	February 18, 1970	1:26
13.	"I Can't Stop Loving You"	Don Gibson	February 19, 1970	2:21
14.	"Suspicious Minds"	Mark James	February 19, 1970	5:04
15.	"Never Been to Spain"	Hoyt Axton	February 16, 1972	3:28
16.	"You Gave Me A Mountain"	Marty Robbins	February 16, 1972	3:15
17.	"It's Impossible"	Armando Manzanero, Sid Wayne	February 16, 1972	2:52
18.	"It's Over"	Jimmie Rodgers	February 17, 1972	2:20
19.	"Hound Dog"	Jerry Leiber, Mike Stoller	February 14, 1972	1:06
20.	"Little Sister" / "Get Back" (medley)	Doc Pomus, Mort Shuman / John Lennon, Paul McCartney	February 14, 1972	1:54
21.	"A Big Hunk o' Love"	Aaron Schroeder, Sidney Wyche	February 16, 1972	2:02
22.	"The Impossible Dream"	Joe Darion, Mitch Leigh	February 16, 1972	2:29
23.	"An American Trilogy"	arranged by Mickey Newbury	February 16, 1972	4:31
Total length:				1:07:13

Disc four
No.	Title	Writer(s)	Recording date	Length
1.	"Heartbreak Hotel"	Mae Boren Axton, Tommy Durden	May 6, 1956	3:02
2.	"Long Tall Sally"	Robert Blackwell, Enotris Johnson, Richard Penniman	May 6, 1956	4:02
3.	"Blue Suede Shoes"	Carl Perkins	May 6, 1956	3:32
4.	"Money Honey"	Jesse Stone	May 6, 1956	2:49
5.	"Promised Land"	Chuck Berry	August 19, 1974	2:43
6.	"It’s Midnight"	Jerry Chesnut, Billy Edd Wheeler	August 21, 1974	2:54
7.	"If You Talk in Your Sleep"	Johnny Christopher, Red West	August 21, 1974	3:04
8.	"I'm Leavin'"	Sonny Charles, Michael Jarrett	August 21, 1974	3:05
9.	"Why Me Lord"	Kris Kristofferson	August 21, 1974	3:00
10.	"Help Me"	Larry Gatlin, Elvis Presley	August 22, 1974	2:26
11.	"Softly As I Leave You"	Giorgio Calabrese, Tony de Vita, Hal Shaper	August 21, 1974	2:30
12.	"My Baby Left Me"	Arthur "Big Boy" Crudup	August 19, 1974	3:10
13.	"It's Now or Never"	Eduardo Di Capua, Wally Gold, Aaron Schroeder	August 27, 1974	2:30
14.	"Hawaiian Wedding Song"	Al Hoffman, Charles E. King, Dick Manning	August 21, 1974	1:59
15.	"Tryin' to Get to You"	Rose Marie McCoy, Charles Singleton	August 20, 1974	1:55
16.	"Green Green Grass of Home"	Curly Putman	March 22, 1975	3:30
17.	"You're the Reason I'm Living"	Bobby Darin	March 22, 1975	2:40
18.	"Big Boss Man"	Luther Dixon, Al Smith	March 30, 1975	2:30
19.	"Burning Love"	Dennis Linde	March 30, 1975	2:42
20.	"My Boy"	Jean-Pierre Bourtayre, Claude François, Phil Coulter, Bill Martin	March 30, 1975	4:40
21.	"And I Love You So"	Don McLean	December 6, 1975	3:24
22.	"Just Pretend"	Guy Fletcher, Doug Flett	December 6, 1975	3:44
23.	"How Great Thou Art"	Stuart K. Hine	December 6, 1975	4:24
24.	"America the Beautiful"	Katherine Lee Bates, Samuel A. Ward	December 6, 1975	2:12
Total length:				1:12:27

== Chart performance ==
Chart (2015)	Peak position
Dutch Top 100 Albums	63
