= From Memphis to Vegas / From Vegas to Memphis =

- The cover of side one and side two, known as Elvis In Person at the International Hotel

Studio album and live album by Elvis Presley
- Released: October 14, 1969
- Recorded: January, February, August 24–26, 1969
- Venue: International Hotel (Winchester)
- Studio: American Sound (Memphis)
- Genres: Rock, soul, pop
- Length: 32:06 (Studio LP); 36:38 (Live LP); 68:44 (Total)
- Label: RCA Victor
- Producers: Chips Moman Studio LP; Felton Jarvis Live LP

Elvis Presley chronology
From Elvis in Memphis (1969)	From Memphis to Vegas / From Vegas to Memphis (1969)	Let's Be Friends (1970)

Alternative cover
- The cover of side three and side four, known as Back in Memphis

Professional ratings
Review scores
Source	Rating
AllMusic	&
Robert Christgau	B+
MusicHound	3/5 stars
Rolling Stone	(unfavourable)
The Rolling Stone Album Guide	4/5 stars
Rough Guides	4/5 stars

From Memphis to Vegas / From Vegas to Memphis is the eleventh studio album and the second live album by American singer and musician Elvis Presley. It was released on October 14, 1969, by RCA Records. It is a double album: the first album, titled In Person at the International Hotel, Las Vegas, Nevada, contains the live recordings of Presley's hits at the International Hotel in Winchester, Nevada, while the second album, titled Back in Memphis, contains entirely new material recorded at American Sound Studio in Memphis. The album peaked at No. 12 on the Billboard 200, and was certified Gold on December 13, 1969, by the Recording Industry Association of America.

== Content ==
Issued to capitalize upon the response to From Elvis in Memphis and its hit singles, and his newfound success as a headliner in Las Vegas, Vegas/Memphis is Presley's first double album and his first official live album. Presley's manager, Colonel Tom Parker, secured a month-long engagement at the International Hotel, and in keeping with the "clear-the-decks" philosophy of the previous album, Presley jettisoned his long-serving 1960s sidemen in favor of musicians who would become his Taking Care of Business band. The musicians used on the second LP were assembled by Chips Moman dating back from early 1969 at the American Sound Studios sessions in Memphis.

The first album consisted of recordings from those shows, Elvis' first live performances since his March 1961 benefit concert in Hawaii. Signature hits from his 1950s and early 1960s repertoire appeared alongside a cover of "Words" by the Bee Gees, his recent hit single "In The Ghetto" and an extended version of "Suspicious Minds", the single of which had only just been released during the engagement.

The second album consisted of ten recordings from the winter of 1969 sessions at American Sound not used for From Elvis in Memphis. Although drawn from what were basically leftovers, still "Stranger in My Hometown" equaled the intensity of the already issued songs. Of these remainders, "The Fair's Moving On" and "You'll Think of Me" had previously appeared as B-sides respectively to "Clean Up Your Own Backyard" and "Suspicious Minds" earlier in the year.

== Reissues ==
In November 1970, RCA reissued the set as individual albums, only in the US, identified by the subtitles that appeared on the original double LP, In Person at the International Hotel, Las Vegas, Nevada as LSP 4428, and Back in Memphis as LSP 4429. They have been issued separately ever since. However, the double LP LSP 6020 was also available concurrently through the 1970s. In the United Kingdom, this has only ever been released as the double LP set, keeping the integrity of the original project. The entirety of Back in Memphis can be found on compact disc in the boxed set From Nashville to Memphis: The Essential 60s Masters, and on the double-disc compilation of recordings at American Sound Studio, Suspicious Minds.

RCA reissued both albums on separate CDs in 1992. On July 28, 2009, Back in Memphis was reissued on the second disc of the RCA/Legacy Edition of From Elvis in Memphis. A similar Legacy Edition of On Stage released on March 23, 2010, features the entirety of In Person at the International Hotel, Las Vegas, Nevada on its second disc.

The collectors' label Follow That Dream has released several of the full performances from Presley's August 1969 season in Las Vegas. The full August 22 performance was included on a reissue of the live album, titled In Person. The full midnight show from August 23 was released under the title Elvis At The International, while the midnight show from August 26 was released as All Shook Up. The August 24 show is available on the first disc of the 2001 box set Live in Las Vegas. In 2013, FTD released the complete midnight show from August 25.

== Track listing ==
=== Elvis in Person ===
Side one
No.	Title	Writer(s)	Recording date	Length
1.	"Blue Suede Shoes"	Carl Perkins	August 25, 1969	2:06
2.	"Johnny B. Goode"	Chuck Berry	August 24, 1969	2:12
3.	"All Shook Up"	Otis Blackwell, Elvis Presley	August 25, 1969	2:15
4.	"Are You Lonesome Tonight?"	Lou Handman, Roy Turk	August 24, 1969	3:16
5.	"Hound Dog"	Jerry Leiber, Mike Stoller	August 25, 1969	1:53
6.	"I Can't Stop Loving You"	Don Gibson	August 25, 1969	3:19
7.	"My Babe"	Willie Dixon	August 25, 1969	2:12

Side two
No.	Title	Writer(s)	Recording date	Length
1.	"Mystery Train" / "Tiger Man"	Junior Parker, / Joe Hill Louis, Sam Phillips (as Sam Burns)	August 25, 1969	3:46
2.	"Words"	Robin Gibb, Barry Gibb, Maurice Gibb	August 25, 1969	2:46
3.	"In the Ghetto"	Mac Davis	August 25, 1969	2:56
4.	"Suspicious Minds"	Mark James	August 26, 1969	7:46
5.	"Can't Help Falling In Love"	George Weiss, Hugo Peretti, Luigi Creatore	August 26, 1969	2:12

=== Back in Memphis ===
Side three
No.	Title	Writer(s)	Recording date	Length
1.	"Inherit the Wind"	Eddie Rabbitt	January 15, 1969	2:56
2.	"This Is the Story"	Chris Arnold, David Martin, Geoff Morrow	January 13, 1969	2:28
3.	"Stranger in My Own Home Town"	Percy Mayfield	February 17, 1969	4:23
4.	"A Little Bit of Green"	Chris Arnold, David Martin, Geoff Morrow	January 14, 1969	3:21
5.	"And the Grass Won't Pay No Mind"	Neil Diamond	February 17, 1969	3:08

Side four
No.	Title	Writer(s)	Recording date	Length
1.	"Do You Know Who I Am?"	Bobby Russell	February 18, 1969	2:49
2.	"From a Jack to a King"	Ned Miller	January 21, 1969	2:23
3.	"The Fair's Moving On"	Guy Fletcher, Doug Flett	February 21, 1969	3:09
4.	"You'll Think of Me"	Mort Shuman	January 14, 1969	4:01
5.	"Without Love (There Is Nothing)"	Danny Small	January 22, 1969	2:51

== Personnel ==
Elvis in Person at the International Hotel

- Elvis Presley – vocals, electric guitar, acoustic guitar, overdubbed backing vocals on “Johnny B. Goode”
- James Burton – lead guitar
- John Wilkinson − rhythm guitar
- Charlie Hodge − harmony and backing vocals, acoustic rhythm guitar
- Larry Muhoberac − keyboards
- Jerry Scheff – bass
- Ron Tutt − drums
- Millie Kirkham − backing vocals
- The Imperials − backing vocals
- The Sweet Inspirations − backing vocals
- Bobby Morris and his Orchestra – orchestra

Back in Memphis

- Elvis Presley − vocals, guitar, piano
- Ed Kollis − harmonica
- Reggie Young − electric guitar
- Bobby Wood − piano
- Bobby Emmons − organ
- Tommy Cogbill, Mike Leech − bass
- Gene Chrisman − drums
- Glen Spreen − string and horn arrangements

Overdubbed:

- Wayne Jackson, Dick Steff, R. F. Taylor − trumpets
- Ed Logan, Jack Hale, Gerald Richardson − trombones
- Tony Cason, Joe D'Gerolamo − French horns
- Andrew Love, Jackie Thomas, Glen Spreen, J.P. Luper − saxophones
- Joe Babcock, Dolores Edgin, Mary Greene, Charlie Hodge, Ginger Holladay, Mary Holladay, Millie Kirkham, Ronnie Milsap, Sonja Montgomery, June Page, Susan Pilkington, Sandy Posey, Donna Thatcher, Hurschel Wiginton − backing vocals

== Charts ==
Charts (1969–1970)	Peak position
Norwegian Albums (VG-lista)	20
UK Albums (Official Charts)	6
US Billboard 200	12
