= Rubberneckin' =

1969 single by Elvis Presley

Single by Elvis Presley
- A-side: "Don't Cry Daddy"
- Released: November 11, 1969
- Recorded: January 20, 1969
- Studio: American Sound
- Length: 2:11
- Label: RCA Victor
- Songwriters: Dory Jones; Bunny Warren

Elvis Presley singles chronology
"Suspicious Minds" / "You'll Think of Me" (1969)	"Rubberneckin'" (1969)	"Kentucky Rain" (1970)

"Rubberneckin'" is a song performed by Elvis Presley, which was recorded at American Sound Studio. It was used in the film Change of Habit and subsequently issued as the B-side of "Don't Cry Daddy" (RCA single 47–9768) in conjunction with the movie premiere. It reached number six in the United States on the Billboard Hot 100 in 1969.

== Paul Oakenfold remix ==
"Rubberneckin'" (Paul Oakenfold remix)

Single by Elvis

from the album 2nd to None
- Released: August 25, 2003
- Length: 3:28
- Label: RCA; BMG
- Songwriters: Dory Jones; Bunny Warren
- Producers: Paul Oakenfold; Ad Bradley

Elvis singles chronology
"A Little Less Conversation" (2002)	"Rubberneckin'" (Paul Oakenfold remix) (2003)	"That's All Right" (2004)

Paul Oakenfold singles chronology
"Hypnotised" (2003)	"Rubberneckin'" (Paul Oakenfold remix) (2003)	"Faster Kill Pussycat" (2006)

In 2003, after the worldwide success of Dutch musician Junkie XL's remix of "A Little Less Conversation" a year before, English record producer Paul Oakenfold remixed "Rubberneckin'", and it was released as a single from the album Elvis 2nd to None. It peaked at number two in Canada, number three in Australia, and reached the top 10 in Denmark, Finland, Ireland, and the United Kingdom.

=== Track listings ===
Standard CD single

1. "Rubberneckin'" (Paul Oakenfold remix radio edit) – 3:28
2. "Rubberneckin'" (Paul Oakenfold remix 12-inch extended) – 5:19
3. "Rubberneckin'" (original) – 2:09

12-inch single

A1. "Rubberneckin'" (Paul Oakenfold remix 12-inch extended) – 5:19
B1. "Rubberneckin'" (Paul Oakenfold remix radio edit) – 3:28
B2. "Rubberneckin'" (original) – 2:09

7-inch and European CD single

A. "Rubberneckin'" (Paul Oakenfold remix radio edit) – 3:28
B. "Rubberneckin'" (original) – 2:09

=== Charts ===
==== Weekly charts ====
Chart (2003)	Peak position
Australia (ARIA)	3
Belgium (Ultratop 50 Flanders)	17
Belgium (Ultratip Bubbling Under Wallonia)	5
Canada (Nielsen SoundScan)	2
CIS Airplay (TopHit)	27
Denmark (Tracklisten)	4
Europe (Eurochart Hot 100)	8
Finland (Suomen virallinen lista)	6
Hungary (Rádiós Top 40)	40
Ireland (IRMA)	10
Italy (FIMI)	15
Netherlands (Dutch Top 40)	9
Netherlands (Single Top 100)	4
New Zealand (Recorded Music NZ)	18
Russia Airplay (TopHit)	12
Scotland Singles (OCC)	6
Spain (Promusicae)	13
Switzerland (Schweizer Hitparade)	19
UK Singles (OCC)	5
UK Dance (OCC)	6
Ukraine Airplay (TopHit)	32
US Billboard Hot 100	94
US Dance Singles Sales (Billboard)	1

==== Year-end charts ====
Chart (2003)	Position
Australia (ARIA)	75
CIS Airplay (TopHit)	40
Netherlands (Single Top 100)	85
Russia Airplay (TopHit)	20
Sweden (Hitlistan)	84
UK Singles (OCC)	154
Ukraine Airplay (TopHit)	103
US Dance Singles Sales (Billboard)	5

Chart (2004)	Position
US Dance Singles Sales (Billboard)	6

=== Release history ===
Region	Date	Format(s)	Label(s)	Ref.
United States	August 25, 2003	Contemporary hit; hot adult contemporary radio	RCA; BMG	
Australia	September 1, 2003	CD	RCA; BMG	
Denmark	September 8, 2003	CD	RCA; BMG	
Japan	September 10, 2003	CD	RCA; BMG	
United Kingdom	September 22, 2003	CD	RCA; BMG	
