= Mama Liked the Roses =

Single by Elvis Presley
- A-side: "The Wonder of You"
- Released: April 20, 1970
- Recorded: January 15–16 and 21–22, 1969; March 18–19, 1969; March 31, 1970
- Studio: American Sound Studios, Memphis, Tennessee
- Genre: Gospel
- Length: 2:36
- Label: RCA Victor
- Songwriter: John L. Christopher
- Producers: Chips Moman, Felton Jarvis

Elvis Presley singles chronology
"Kentucky Rain" (1970)	"Mama Liked the Roses" / "The Wonder of You" (1970)	"I've Lost You" / "The Next Step Is Love" (1970)

"Mama Liked the Roses" is a song by Elvis Presley released in 1970. The song was released as the B-side to "The Wonder of You" single on April 20, 1970, and on the 1970 RCA Camden reissue of Elvis' Christmas Album, though the song is not specifically about Christmas.

== Background ==
The song's basic track (guitar, two basses, piano, organ, and drums from The Memphis Boys, the house band for American Sound Studio) was recorded on January 15–16, 1969, without Elvis Presley present. Elvis overdubbed his lead vocals and a harmony vocal part that was unused in the final master recording, on January 21–22, 1969. Initial backing vocals were also recorded on January 21–22, 1969. Strings and brass were overdubbed on March 18 and 19, 1969, before a final backing vocal overdub was added on March 31, 1970.

The song peaked at No. 9 on the Billboard Hot 100 singles chart in a pairing with "The Wonder of You". The song was composed by Johnny Christopher, who also co-wrote "If You Talk in Your Sleep" and "Always on My Mind", both recorded by Elvis Presley.

== Personnel ==
Credits from Keith Flynn and Ernst Jorgensen's examination of session tapes and RCA and AFM paperwork.

- Elvis Presley – lead vocals; harmony vocals (unused in final mix)
- Reggie Young – guitar
- Tommy Cogbill – bass
- Mike Leech – bass; horn and string arrangements; overdubbed viola; session "leader" for string overdub session
- Bobby Wood – piano
- Bobby Emmons – organ
- Gene Chrisman – drums

Overdubbed

- Mary "Jeanie" Greene, Mary Holladay, Ginger Holladay, Donna Thatcher, Sandra Posey Robinson – backing vocals
- Dolores Edgin, June "Ricki" Page, Hurschel Wiginton, Joseph Babcock – backing vocals (uncertain)
- Glen Spreen – saxophone; horn and string arrangements
- Wayne Jackson, R.F. Taylor – trumpets
- Jackie Thomas, Jack Hale – trombones
- Joe D'Gerolamo, Tony Cason – French horns
- Noel Gilbert – violin; session contractor for string overdub session
- Gloria Hendricks, Albert Edelman, Robert Snyder, Anna Oldham, Hal Saunders, Edward Freudberg – violins
- Mary Snyder, John Wehlan, Nono Ravarono, Vernon Taylor – violas
- Anne Kendall, Peter Spurbeck – cellos

Production staff

- Chips Moman – producer
- Felton Jarvis – producer
- Al Pachucki – engineer
- Roy Shockley – technician
