= Let's Be Friends =

Compilation album by Elvis Presley
- Released: April 1970
- Recorded: March 1962 to March 1969
- Genres: Rock, country
- Length: 21:23
- Label: RCA Camden

Elvis Presley chronology
From Memphis to Vegas / From Vegas to Memphis (1969)	Let's Be Friends (1970)	On Stage (1970)

Let's Be Friends is a compilation album by American singer and musician Elvis Presley, released by RCA Records CAS 2408, in April 1970. It is the second Presley budget album to appear on the low-priced RCA Camden label. It peaked at number 105 on the Billboard 200 album chart. It was certified Gold on June 15, 1999, and Platinum on January 6, 2004, by the Recording Industry Association of America.

== Content ==
Similar to its predecessor Elvis Sings Flaming Star, Let's Be Friends collects mostly unreleased songs recorded for Presley film soundtracks. Given the recent work of the revitalized Presley, in the past, his manager Colonel Tom Parker might have objected to this kind of market saturation, but under the terms of Presley's agreement with RCA Records, budget albums brought extra cash outside of contract stipulations.

Two non-movie outtakes appeared from the winter of 1969 sessions at American Sound Studio in Memphis, "I'll Be There" and "If I'm a Fool (For Loving You)". "Mama" was sung in the film Girls! Girls! Girls! by The Amigos and Presley's version first appeared on this album, with an alternate, abridged version included on the compact disc Elvis Double Features: Kid Galahad/Girls! Girls! Girls!. "Let's Forget About the Stars" had been recorded for the film Charro!, but cut from the picture. "Almost" was one of only two tracks from The Trouble with Girls to see release in Presley's lifetime. Three tracks, "Let's Be Friends", "Change of Habit", and "Have a Happy", originated from Presley's then-current film Change of Habit, thus casting the album in the additional role as soundtrack LP for the film (two additional tracks from the movie, "Rubberneckin'" and "Let Us Pray", are omitted, the former being released on a single in 1969 and the latter held until the 1971 budget collection You'll Never Walk Alone).

Like all Presley releases on the budget RCA Camden label, the album's running time was shorter than most full-priced albums in the 1970s. In 1975, RCA leased several Camden titles for reissue by Pickwick Records. Pickwick reissued the LP under the original RCA Camden catalog number CAS 2408 and with a black border around the original cover art. In 2006, RCA/Sony reissued Let's Be Friends along with most of Presley's other RCA Camden titles on compact disc.

== Track listing ==
Side one
No.	Title	Writer(s)	Recording date	Length
1.	"Stay Away, Joe" (from Stay Away, Joe)	Ben Weisman, Sid Wayne	October 1, 1967	1:37
2.	"If I'm a Fool (For Loving You)"	Stan Kesler	February 20, 1969	2:43
3.	"Let's Be Friends" (recorded for Change of Habit)	Chris Arnold, David Martin, Geoff Morrow	March 5, 1969	2:41
4.	"Let's Forget About the Stars" (from Charro! [cut from final print])	A. L. Owens	October 15, 1968	2:22
5.	"Mama" (from Girls! Girls! Girls!)	Charles O'Curran, Dudley Brooks	March 28, 1962	2:13

Side two
No.	Title	Writer(s)	Recording date	Length
1.	"I'll Be There"	Bobby Darin	January 23, 1969	2:21
2.	"Almost" (from The Trouble with Girls)	Ben Weisman, Buddy Kaye	October 23, 1968	1:47
3.	"Change of Habit" (from Change of Habit)	Ben Weisman, Buddy Kaye	March 5, 1969	3:18
4.	"Have a Happy" (from Change of Habit)	Ben Weisman, Dolores Fuller, Buddy Kaye	March 5, 1969	2:21

== See also ==
- Elvis for Everyone, 1965 album
