= Suspicious Minds (disambiguation) =

"Suspicious Minds" is a song written and recorded by Mark James and made famous by Elvis Presley.

Suspicious Minds may also refer to:

- Suspicious Minds (album), an anthology album (full name Suspicious Minds: The Memphis 1969 Anthology) a compilation of Elvis songs
- "Suspicious Minds" (Birds of a Feather), a 1993 television episode
- "Suspicious Minds" (Desperate Housewives), a 2004 television episode
- "Suspicious Minds" (NCIS: New Orleans), a 2016 television episode
- "Suspicious Minds" (The Real Housewives of Orange County), a 2015 television episode
- "Suspicious Minds" (Supergirl), a 2019 television episode

== See also ==
- With Suspicious Minds, an album by Vesna Pisarović
