= Do You Know Who I Am =

Do You Know Who I Am may refer to:

- A song by Elvis Presley appearing on the album From Memphis to Vegas/From Vegas to Memphis
- A British game show. See Do You Know Who I Am?
- A book by British author Nichola Wilson-Miller
