= Elvis Presley on film and television =

Filmography

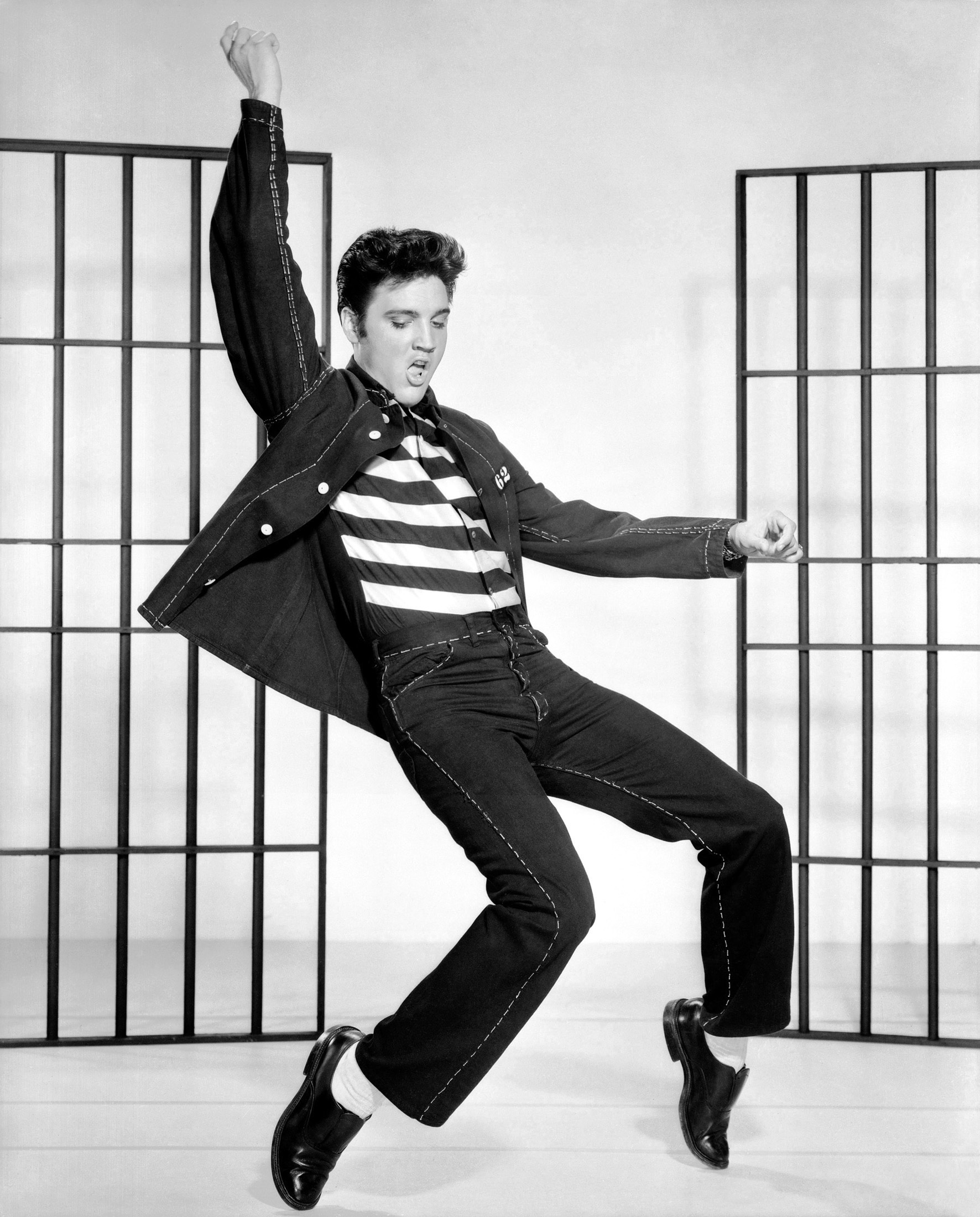
- Elvis in a publicity photo for the film Jailhouse Rock in 1957
- Films: 31
- Documentary films: 7
- Television: 10
- Home videos: 45

Elvis Presley was an American entertainer and Laurel Award-winning actor who achieved initial success as a singer and stage performer, with later success as an actor. He had hit films at the box office, hit singles, and hit albums simultaneously. Presley starred in 17 box office top-ten films between 1956 and 1965, with 17 number one singles and 8 number one albums in the same time period.

His feature debut was in Love Me Tender in 1956 for 20th Century Fox, with the commercial success of the soundtrack EP being a bellwether for the next three Presley films, Loving You, Jailhouse Rock, and King Creole, with the latter achieving critical acclaim. Presley was in the Top Ten Money Making Stars Poll for seven years, making $1 million per film. His films combined made $284 million.

== Acting credits ==
=== Television ===
as himself
Year	Title	Notes	Ref(s)
1956	Stage Show	6 episodes at the CBS studios in New York City, NY: January 28, February 4, 11, 18, March 17, 24; Tommy and Jimmy Dorsey's show, produced by Jackie Gleason as a lead-in for his show	
1956	Texaco Star Theatre	2 episodes: April 3 aboard the USS Hancock in San Diego, CA; June 5 NBC studios Los Angeles, CA	
1956	Teenage Dance Party	June 16; hosted by Wink Martindale, WHBQ-TV Memphis, TN (interview only)	
1956	Hy Gardner Calling	July 1 television interview, WRCA-TV, New York City, NY (interview only)	
1956	The Steve Allen Show	July 1; NBC, New York City, NY	
1956–57	The Ed Sullivan Show	3 episodes: September 9, October 28, 1956; January 6, 1957, CBS New York City, NY	
1960	The Frank Sinatra Timex Show: Welcome Home Elvis	Taped March 26, in Miami, FL; aired on ABC May 12	
1968	Elvis: The 1968 Comeback Special	Also known as One Night With You; June taping at NBC Los Angeles, CA; air date December 3	
1973	Aloha from Hawaii Via Satellite	Kui Lee Cancer Fund benefit concert at Honolulu's Neal S. Blaisdell Center broadcast by NBC world-wide January 14	
1977	Elvis in Concert	The last concert tour before Presley died; broadcast by CBS after his death; has never been re-broadcast or officially released on home video	

=== Film ===
Year	Title	Role	Studio	Notes	Ref(s)
1956	Love Me Tender	Clint Reno	20th Century Fox	First feature film role. Caused a protest among fans at the film's premiere when they learn that Presley's character dies at the end of the film, triggering an alternate ending. Includes the song "Love Me Tender".	
1957	Loving You	Jimmy Tompkins (Deke Rivers)	Paramount Pictures		
1957	Jailhouse Rock	Vince Everett	MGM	Added to the National Film Registry in 2004. Title song listed at #24 in AFI's 100 Years...100 Songs.	
1958	King Creole	Danny Fisher	Paramount Pictures	Banned in Mexico after a riot ensued at the Las Americas cinema in Mexico City, where the movie had its premiere. Final film before military service.	
1960	G.I. Blues	Tulsa McLean	Paramount Pictures	Grammy nominated soundtrack album. Banned in Mexico after a similar riot took place, also at the Las Americas cinema in Mexico City. All further Elvis films banned as a result, with the restriction being lifted in 1971.	
1960	Flaming Star	Pacer Burton	20th Century Fox	A single film still from the film was used by Andy Warhol in 26 of his silkscreen paintings, eight of which are known to have garnered US$375 million at auction and in private sales. The paintings include Triple Elvis and Eight Elvises.	
1961	Wild in the Country	Glenn Tyler	20th Century Fox		
1961	Blue Hawaii	Chad Gates	Paramount Pictures	Grammy nominated soundtrack album	
1962	Follow That Dream	Toby Kwimper	Mirisch Company		
1962	Kid Galahad	Walter Gulick / Kid Galahad	Mirisch Company		
1962	Girls! Girls! Girls!	Ross Carpenter	Paramount Pictures		
1963	It Happened at the World's Fair	Mike Edwards	MGM	Filmed at the Seattle World's Fair	
1963	Fun in Acapulco	Mike Windgren	Paramount Pictures	Filmed in Acapulco by the 2nd unit crew with an Elvis double as his stand-in, as Elvis was persona non grata in Mexico in November 1962, with filming resuming in Hollywood in January 1963 at Paramount, where Elvis filmed his own scenes in the studio in front of a screen showing scenes filmed earlier at the Mexican location. The movie was not shown in Mexico, whose government only lifted its Presley ban in the summer of 1971, when Elvis: That's the Way It Is opened outside the US.	
1964	Kissin' Cousins	Josh Morgan / Jodie Tatum	MGM	Featured Presley in a dual role. Filmed after Viva Las Vegas	
1964	Viva Las Vegas	Lucky Jackson	MGM	Laurel Award nominated Best Actor. Filmed before Kissin' Cousins	
1964	Roustabout	Charlie Rogers	Paramount Pictures	Elvis did his own stunts for the film and was badly injured in a motorcycle crash. He hid the accident from his manager and made sure it was included in the film before this was found out. Elvis was too valuable an actor to be insured.	
1965	Girl Happy	Rusty Wells	MGM		
1965	Tickle Me	Lonnie Beale / Panhandle Kid	Allied Artists	Laurel Award winner Best Actor	
1965	Harum Scarum	Johnny Tyronne	MGM		
1966	Frankie and Johnny	Johnny	United Artists		
1966	Paradise, Hawaiian Style	Rick Richards	Paramount Pictures		
1966	Spinout	Mike McCoy	MGM		
1967	Easy Come, Easy Go	Lt. (j.g.) Ted Jackson	Paramount Pictures	Filmed after Double Trouble	
1967	Double Trouble	Guy Lambert	MGM	Filmed before Easy Come, Easy Go	
1967	Clambake	Scott Heyward	United Artists		
1968	Stay Away, Joe	Joe Lightcloud	MGM	Filmed after Speedway	
1968	Speedway	Steve Grayson	MGM	Filmed in part at Charlotte Motor Speedway in Concord, NC, with various NASCAR drivers of the day contributing. Filmed before Stay Away, Joe	
1968	Live a Little, Love a Little	Greg Nolan	MGM		
1969	Charro!	Jess Wade	National General		
1969	The Trouble with Girls	Walter Hale	MGM		
1969	Change of Habit	Dr. John Carpenter	Universal	Final feature film role.	
1970	Elvis: That's the Way It Is	Himself	MGM	Concert documentary	
1972	Elvis on Tour	Himself	MGM	Concert documentary, co-winner Golden Globe for Best Documentary 1972	
1974 (released 2002)	New Gladiators	Karate Expert Cop	MGM	Film & Documentary	
1981	This Is Elvis	Himself	Warner	Documentary	
2018	Elvis Presley: The Searcher	Himself (archival documentary footage)	HBO	Documentary	
2023	Reinventing Elvis: The '68 Comeback	Himself (archival documentary footage)	MTV Studios/Paramount+	Documentary	
2024	The Return of the King: The Fall and Rise of Elvis Presley	Himself (archival documentary footage)	Netflix	Documentary	
2026	EPiC: Elvis Presley in Concert	Himself (archival documentary footage)	Universal Pictures	Documentary	

=== Home video ===
At the present time, he has 13 certified RIAA video longforms (1 Gold and 12 Platinum) and one video single (Platinum) - 34 certifications in all.

Year	Title	Studio	Formats	Certifications	Ref(s)
1977	The Story of Elvis Presley	Burbank Video/RCA/Columbia Pictures Home Video	VHS 1990/1991		
1982	Elvis on Tour	MGM/UA Home Video, Warner Home Video	VHS 1982, DVD 2010		
1984	Elvis Presley's Graceland	Elvis Presley Enterprises/Congress Video Group	VHS 1984/1985/1988/1997, DVD, 2xDVD 2008, streaming 2021		
1984	Elvis: Aloha From Hawaii	Pioneer Artists, Music Media, RCA	VHS 1984, VHS	RIAA: Platinum	
1985	Elvis '68 Comeback Special	Media Home Entertainment Inc., Music Media, RCA, BMG Strategic Marketing	VHS 1985	RIAA: Gold	
1985	Elvis: Memories	Live Home Video/Vestron Video International/ElvisPresleyShop.com	VHS 1985/1986, DVD		
1985	Elvis: One Night with You	Elvis Presley Enterprises/HBO/RCA Records/Media Home Entertainment/Warner Home Video	VHS 1989/1992/2000, DVD 2000		
1987	Elvis '56	Lightyear Entertainment/BMG Video/Sony Pictures Home Entertainment	VHS 1987, DVD 1997/2004/2006/2009/2012/2017, streaming 2020	BPI: Gold	
1987	Elvis: His Life and Times	Elvis Presley Enterprises/RayCom Video Ent.	VHS 1993		
1989	The Milton Berle Show: The Lost Elvis	Amvest/Hotline Sales/BMG Models	VHS 1989, DVD 2003, streaming 2017		
1989	The Great Performances (Volume One: Center Stage)	Buena Vista Home Video,	Laserdisc 1989. VHS 1990	RIAA: Platinum	
1989	The Great Performances (Volume Two: The Man and the Music)	Buena Vista Home Video,	Laserdisc 1989. VHS 1990	RIAA: Platinum	
1992	Elvis: The Lost Performances	MGM/UA Home Entertainment	VHS/DVD	RIAA: Platinum; BPI: Gold	
1993	Biography - Elvis Aaron Presley: Story of a Legend	A&E Home Video	VHS 1998, DVD 2005, streaming 2020		
1993	Elvis in Hollywood	Elvis Presley Enterprises/Sony Legacy/BMG Special Products	VHS/DVD		
1995	Elvis: Touch the Dream, a New Generation	Elvis Presley Enterprises/Raycom Media/Turner Classic Movies	Broadcast		
1997	Elvis: The Great Performances, Volume 3 - From the Waist Up	Rhino Home Video	DVD 1997		
1998	He Touched Me: The Gospel Music of Elvis Presley	Coming Home Music/EMI/Gaither Music Group/Chordant	VHS 1998	RIAA: Platinum	
1999	He Touched Me: The Gospel Music of Elvis Presley, Vol. 2	Coming Home Music/EMI/Gaither Music Group/Chordant	VHS 1999	RIAA: 2× Platinum	
2000	He Touched Me: The Gospel Music of Elvis Presley, Vol. 1 & 2	Coming Home Music/EMI/Gaither Music Group/Chordant	2xVHS 2000, 2xDVD 2000/2005, streaming 2020		
2001	Classic Albums: Elvis Presley	EagleVision/Qello Concerts	VHS/DVD 2002, streaming 2016		
2001	That's The Way it Is	Warner Home Video	DVD 2001	BPI: 5× Platinum	
2002	Elvis: His Best Friend Remembers	Proletariat Filmworks/MCA/Universal Pictures	VHS/DVD 2002, streaming 2018		
2002	Elvis: The Ultimate Collection	Universal Pictures	DVD 2002	BPI: Platinum	
2002	Elvis: The Great Performances, Vol. 1-3	Elvis Presley Enterprises/Andrew Solt Prods./Rhino Home Video/Buena Vista Pictures/SOFA Entertainment	DVD 2002/2010/2011/2018, streaming 2020		
2002	Rare Moments with the King	GoodTimes Entertainment	DVD 2002		
2003	A Little Less Conversation (video single)	Lidrock	CD-ROM 2003	RIAA: 6× Platinum	
2004	Elvis: Aloha From Hawaii (Deluxe Edition)	RCA	DVD 2004	RIAA: 4× Platinum; BPI: 3× Platinum; ARIA: 2× Platinum; MC: 3× Platinum; SNEP: Platinum; IFPI Austria: Gold	
2004	Elvis '68 Comeback Special (Deluxe Edition)	Media Home Entertainment Inc., Music Media, RCA, BMG Strategic Marketing	DVD 2004	RIAA: 4× Platinum; BPI: 3× Platinum; ARIA: 6× Platinum; MC: 3× Platinum; SNEP: Platinum; RMNZ: Gold	
2005	Elvis by the Presleys	Elvis Presley Enterprises/CBS/RCA Records/Sony BMG/Sony Legacy/Cineverse	2xDVD, streaming	RIAA: 2× Platinum; BPI: Platinum	
2005	In Concert (The Early Years)	WHE International Limited	DVD 2005	BPI: Platinum	
2006	Elvis: The Ed Sullivan Shows	Elvis Presley Enterprises/Image Entertainment	3xDVD 2006/2009, streaming 2020	MC: Platinum	
2006	Elvis: Classic Performances	Elvis Presley Enterprises/Coda Publishing Ltd.	DVD 2006, streaming 2012		
2006	Elvis: Aloha From Hawaii (Special Edition)	RCA, Sony BMG Music Entertainment Strategic Marketing Group	DVD 2006	RIAA: 2× Platinum	
2006	Elvis '68 Comeback Special (Special Edition)	Media Home Entertainment Inc., Music Media, RCA, BMG Strategic Marketing	DVD 2006	RIAA: 2× Platinum	
2007	Elvis Lives: The 25th Anniversary Concert, 'Live' from Memphis	Elvis Presley Enterprises/Coming Home Music/EMI/Gaither Music Group/Chordant	DVD 2007/2012, streaming 2007	BPI: Gold	
2007	Elvis: #1 Hit Performances	Elvis Presley Enterprises/Sony BMG/Sony Legacy	DVD 2007/2011, streaming 2020	RIAA: Platinum	
2007	The King of Rock 'n' Roll (#1 Hit Performances and More)	Elvis Presley Enterprises/Sony BMG/Sony Legacy	DVD 2007	BPI: Gold	
2007	This is Elvis	Warner Home Video	DVD 2007	BPI: Gold	
2008	Elvis: #1 Hit Performances & More, Vol 2	Elvis Presley Enterprises/Sony BMG/Sony Legacy	DVD 2008, streaming 2020		
2009	Elvis: Love Me Tender - The Love Songs	Coming Home Music/EMI Music	DVD 2009		
2011	Elvis: Summer of '56	Stuart Goldman Company/Image Entertainment/Docubay	DVD 2011/2015/2021, streaming 2024		
2011	The Elvis Collection	Warner Home Video	DVD 2011	BPI: Gold	
2014	The First Ed Sullivan Show	StarVista Entertainment, Time Life	DVD 2014		
2018	The Searcher	Sony Pictures Television	DVD 2018	BPI: Gold	

== See also ==
- The Pied Piper of Cleveland

== Bibliography ==
- Ellroy, James; Penzler, Otto (2011). The Best American Noir of the Century. New York, NY: Mariner Books. ISBN 978-0-547-57744-9.
- Guralnick, Peter (1994). Last train to Memphis : The Rise of Elvis Presley. Boston, MA: Little, Brown and Company. ISBN 978-0-316-33220-0.
- Guralnick, Peter (1999). Careless Love : The Unmaking of Elvis Presley. Boston, MA: Little, Brown and Company. ISBN 0-316-33222-4.
- Guralnick, Peter; Jorgensen, Ernst (1999). Elvis Day by Day: The Definitive Record of His Life and Music. New York, NY: Ballantine Books. ISBN 978-0-345-42089-3.
- Jorgensen, Ernst; Guralnick, Peter (1998). Elvis Presley: A Live in Music: The Complete Recording Sessions. New York, NY: St. Martin's Press. ISBN 978-0-312-18572-5.
- Lisanti, Tom (2000). Fantasy Femmes of 60's Cinema: Interviews with 20 Actresses from Biker, Beach, and Elvis Movies. Jefferson, NC: McFarland & Company. ISBN 978-0-7864-0868-9.
- Lisanti, Tom (2012). Hollywood Surf and Beach Movies The First Wave, 1959–1969. McFarland & Company. ISBN 978-0-7864-7297-0.
- Marsh, Dave (1982). Elvis. New York, NY: Time Books. ISBN 0-8129-0947-X.
- Neibaur, James L. (2014). The Elvis Movies. Lanham, MD: Rowman & Littlefield. ISBN 978-1-4422-3073-6.
- Rose, Frank (1996). The Agency: William Morris and the Hidden History of Show Business. New York, NY: HarperBusiness. ISBN 978-0-88730-807-9.
- Templeton, Steve; Craig, Yvonne (2002). Elvis Presley: Silver Screen Icon: A Collection of Movie Posters. Johnson City, TN: Overmountain Press. ISBN 978-1-57072-232-5.
