= DNX (disambiguation) =

DNX or DNx may refer to:

- Intact dilation and extraction, a surgical procedure that removes an intact fetus from the uterus
- Galegu Airport, the IATA code DNX
- DNx (Digital Nonlinear Extensible) codecs
  - DNxHR codec, a lossy UHDTV post-production codec
  - Avid DNxHD, a lossy high-definition video post-production codec
- DNX (comics), a Marvel Comics storyline

== See also ==
- DNX vs. The Voice, a German duo
