= Wearin' That Loved-On Look =

Song by Elvis Presley

from the album From Elvis in Memphis
- Released: June 2, 1969 (album)
- Recorded: January 13, 1969
- Studio: American Sound Studio
- Length: 2:44
- Label: RCA Victor
- Songwriters: Dallas Frazier, A.L. "Doodle" Owens
- Producer: Chips Moman

"Wearin' That Loved-On Look" is a song by Nashville songwriters Dallas Frazier and A.L. "Doodle" Owens. It was recorded in 1969 by Elvis Presley for his album From Elvis in Memphis. The song was covered by Canadian band the Sadies on their 2001 album, Tremendous Efforts.
