= The New Gladiators =

The New gladiators may refer to:

- The New Gladiators (film), a karate documentary made by Elvis Presley filmed 1973 and released 2002
- The New Gladiators, also known as Warriors of the Year 2072, a 1984 Italian science fiction film
