= Clean Up Your Own Backyard =

Single by Elvis Presley
- B-side: "The Fair's Moving On"
- Released: June 17, 1969
- Recorded: October 23, 1968
- Studio: United Recorders, Hollywood
- Genre: Country
- Length: 3:06
- Label: RCA Victor
- Songwriters: Mac Davis, Billy Strange

Elvis Presley singles chronology
"In the Ghetto" (1969)	"Clean Up Your Own Backyard" (1969)	"Suspicious Minds" / "You'll Think of Me" (1969)

"Clean Up Your Own Backyard" is a 1969 song recorded by Elvis Presley and released as a single. The song was featured in the Metro-Goldwyn-Mayer film The Trouble with Girls (and How to Get into It).

== Background ==
Written by Mac Davis and Billy Strange and published by Gladys Music, Inc., it was released as a 7" single in 1969 with "The Fair Is Moving On" on the B-side, but not featured on any studio album. The single was also released in the UK, Canada, Germany, Australia, New Zealand, and India.

It reached No. 35 on the Billboard Hot 100 and No. 21 on the UK Singles Chart. The single reached No. 18 on the Record World chart and No. 29 on the Australian Go-Set chart. The RIAA certified the single Gold in March 1992.

The song was from the soundtrack of the MGM film The Trouble with Girls, and was later included on the budget RCA Camden album Almost In Love.

Although The Trouble with Girls is set in the 1920s, several lyrics within this song are anachronistic for the era, such as a reference to "armchair quarterbacks", a term not coined until the advent of television sports broadcasting decades later. The film version of the song does not include the female backing vocals of the single.

== Chart history ==
Chart (1969)	Peak position
Australia (Go-Set)	29
Canada RPM Top Singles	23
New Zealand (Listener)	15
UK	21
U.S. Billboard Hot 100	35
U.S. Billboard Adult Contemporary	37
U.S. Cash Box Top 100	25
U.S. Record World	18

== Other recordings ==
The song has been recorded by Nat Stuckey, O.C. Smith, Tom Green, Jennifer Scott, Sue Moreno, Darrel Higham and The Enforcers, and Lee Birchfield in 2012.
