= DNX vs. The Voice =

DNX vs. The Voice is a German duo. Their first single In The Ghetto released in 2005 is a contemporary version of Elvis Presley's hit (brought out in 1969). The song was accepted at once in the United Kingdom and in the United States. The main vocal of the song is sung by a voice that resembles the voice of Elvis. The genre of music, which the song belongs to, could be defined as funky-house or dance-pop. In The Ghetto is the first song of the series Superstar Elvis Presley. The whole album should have been released in summer 2006.
