= Terry Moloney (filmmaker) =

American film director

- Born: April 7, 1969 (age 57)

Terry Moloney (born April 7, 1969) is an American writer, producer, director and film editor. He has won numerous awards for his work in film and television.

== Career ==
Moloney graduated from the University of Southern California with a BA in journalism. He is a member of the Directors Guild of America, the Producers Guild of America, and the Academy of Television Arts & Sciences, and has won over 50 awards for his creative work in film, TV and advertising. He is also the owner and founder of the Los Angeles-based production company, Proletariat Filmworks.

Moloney is best known for his documentary films, including: We Have The Power, a 60-minute consciousness-raising film on oil, terrorism and America’s energy future (2008), hosted by former Speaker of the House, Newt Gingrich, Walking Home From Moscow, (2007) a chronicle of U.S. citizens seeking out and receiving unproven stem cell treatments and stem cell therapies outside the United States, the multi-award-winning Scene Smoking: Cigarettes, Cinema and the Myth of Cool (2001) featuring Academy Award winner Sean Penn, on the negative impact smoking in film and television has on young people vis-à-vis artists' rights, social responsibility and the first amendment, Elvis: His Best Friend Remembers (2003), covering Diamond Joe Esposito's 20 years with Elvis, for Universal Studios, and A Brief History of Winnie The Pooh (1999), an award-winning short documentary film chronicling the cinematic origin of Pooh Bear for the Walt Disney Studios. He directed the 2004 feature film, Alabama Love Story (2003), and was a staff director on the PAX-TV series Chicken Soup for the Soul (1999).

== Partial filmography ==
as writer/producer/director

- We Have The Power: Making America Energy Independent (2008)
- Walking Home From Moscow, (2007)
- Alabama Love Story (2003)
- Elvis: His Best Friend Remembers (2002) (V)
- Scene Smoking: Cigarettes, Cinema & the Myth of Cool (2001)
- A Brief History of Winnie The Pooh (1999)
- Chicken Soup for the Soul (1999)

as actor

- Shaking the Tree (1991) [Actor .... Barry's Work Buddy
