= You'll Think of Me (Elvis Presley song) =

Single by Elvis Presley

from the album From Memphis to Vegas / From Vegas to Memphis
- A-side: "Suspicious Minds"
- Released: August 26, 1969
- Recorded: January 14, 1969
- Studio: American (Memphis, Tennessee)
- Length: 3:58
- Label: RCA Victor
- Songwriter: Mort Shuman

Elvis Presley singles chronology
"Clean Up Your Own Backyard" (1969)	"Suspicious Minds" / "You'll Think of Me" (1969)	"Don't Cry Daddy" (1969)

"You'll Think of Me" is a song by Elvis Presley from his 1969 double album From Memphis to Vegas / From Vegas to Memphis.

Its first release on record was in August or September 1969 on a single as the reverse side to "Suspicious Minds". On December 1, 1970, the single "Suspicious Minds" / "You'll Think of Me" was re-released as part of RCA Victor's Gold Standard Series (together with nine older Presley's singles).

The single "Suspicious Minds" was certified Gold by RIAA for sales in 1 million copies in the United States on October 28, 1969. On March 27, 1992, it was certified Platinum. It also was the South African single of the year.

== Writing and recording history ==
The song was written by Mort Shuman.

Presley recorded it on January 14, 1969, during a studio session for RCA at the American Sound Studio in Memphis, Tennessee.

== Critical reception ==
Robert Matthew-Walker writes in his book Heartbreak Hotel: the Life and Music of Elvis Presley:

In the last song, 'You'll Think Of Me', there is a strangely disconnected opening which gradually builds to the basic tempo. The song, which lasts almost four minutes, is long for the material, but Presley manages to hold it together through the layers of sound.

== Track listings ==
7-inch single (RCA 47–9764)
7-inch single (RCA Victor 49.623, France, 1969)
7-inch single (A|B RCA Victor N 1588, Italy, 1969)
7-inch single (RCA SS-1913, Japan, 1969)
7-inch single (RCA Victor 3–10436, Spain, 1969)
7-inch single (RCA Victor PB 1103, France, 1977)
7-inch single (RCA Victor RCA-2712, Canada, 1978)

1. "Suspicious Minds" (4:22)
2. "You'll Think of Me" (4:02)

7-inch EP Suspicious Minds (RCA Victor TP-510, Portugal, 1969)

1. "Suspicious Minds"
2. "Known Only to Him"
3. "You'll Think of Me"
4. "Joshua Fit The Battle"

CD single "Suspicious Minds" (RCA Victor 0886971223729, Sony BMG, EAN 0886971223729, 10 August 2007)

1. "Suspicious Minds" (4:22)
2. "You'll Think of Me" (4:02)
3. "Suspicious Minds (Alt. Take 7)"
