= Bobby Emmons =

American musician and songwriter (1943–2015)

Bobby Gene Emmons (February 19, 1943 – February 23, 2015) was an American keyboard player and songwriter. He was an active session musician in Memphis, Tennessee, and was the keyboardist of the Memphis Boys, playing keyboards on tracks by Elvis Presley, Willie Nelson and many others from the 1950s onward. His compositions included "Luckenbach, Texas (Back to the Basics of Love)", written with Chips Moman and recorded by Waylon Jennings; and "Love Me Like You Used To", co-written with Paul Davis and recorded by both Johnny Cash and Tanya Tucker.

Emmons was born in Corinth, Mississippi, and began performing when at high school. In 1960 he joined Bill Black's band and toured widely with Black, both nationally in the US and internationally. He began playing keyboards in the house band at Hi Records around 1963, before moving to Chips Moman's American Sound Studio as a session musician. Among the many records on which he played keyboards in the 1960s and 1970s were Elvis Presley's "Suspicious Minds" and "In the Ghetto", Dusty Springfield's "Son of a Preacher Man", Merrilee Rush's "Angel of the Morning", and Neil Diamond's "Sweet Caroline". He also played on many of Willie Nelson's albums and toured internationally with The Highwaymen.

He died in Nashville in 2015, aged 72.
