= Johnny Christopher =

American musician

John Lee Christopher Jr. (born May 5, 1944, in Atlanta, Georgia) is an American singer, guitarist, session musician and songwriter.

== Music career ==
Christopher's singles included "(She's A) Girl Of Many Colors / The Teacher And The Pet" (1969) and "Love Stuff" (1972).

As a songwriter, he wrote "Mama Liked the Roses" for Elvis Presley and co-wrote "Always on My Mind" with Mark James and Wayne Carson, a song first released by Gwen McCrae in 1972. Brenda Lee and Elvis Presley also recorded and released the song in 1972. The song has been covered by several well-known artists including John Wesley Ryles and the Pet Shop Boys. For Willie Nelson's 1982 cover, Christopher, James, and Carson won Grammy Awards for Song of the Year and Best Country Song, 10 years after its original release.

Christopher also co-wrote the 1974 song "If You Talk in Your Sleep" for Elvis Presley with Red West.

As of 2014, he was no longer in the music industry.
