= Mark James (songwriter) =

American songwriter (1940–2024)

- Also known as: Francis Zambon
- Born: Francis Rodney Zambon; November 29, 1940; Houston, Texas, U.S.
- Died: June 8, 2024 (aged 83) Nashville, Tennessee, U.S.
- Occupations: Singer, songwriter, record producer
- Instrument: Vocals
- Years active: 1968–2024
- Labels: Bell, Scepter, Liberty, Masterfonics

Francis Rodney Zambon (November 29, 1940 – June 8, 2024), known professionally as Mark James, was an American songwriter. He wrote hits for B.J. Thomas, Brenda Lee and Elvis Presley, including "Hooked on a Feeling", "Always on My Mind", and Presley's hit single "Suspicious Minds".

== Early life ==
Mark James was born an Italian-American in Houston, Texas, on November 29, 1940, the son of an Italian-born building contractor and a school teacher, and he was raised there. In high school, he played the violin and the accordion and conducted the school orchestra, but he said later that he had not realised how much he loved music until he picked up a guitar. James befriended singer B.J. Thomas when both were young. He began writing songs and performing in clubs in Houston, and changed his name to Mark James after he was told that 'Francis Zambon' was "a non-starter".

== Career beginning and songwriting ==
At first James intended to record his songs himself rather than give them to other singers. He released his first single, "Jive Note", in 1959. He formed a band, the Mark James Trio, and released several more songs co-written with Bobby Winder, including Running Back and Tell Me, released on Crazy Cajun Records in Houston, Texas, which was a minor hit in 1963. His career was temporarily halted when he was drafted into the US Army to serve in Vietnam with the First Infantry Division.

After his discharge, he moved to Memphis in 1968 and worked as a staff songwriter for Memphis producer Chips Moman's publishing company. In 1968 and 1969 Moman produced Thomas’s versions of "The Eyes of a New York Woman", "Hooked on a Feeling", and "It's Only Love", all of which were successful. "Hooked on a Feeling", inspired by Karen Taylor his high school sweetheart who had inspired "Suspicious Minds", was his first top ten hit.

James released his own version of his song "Suspicious Minds", also produced by Moman, on Scepter Records in 1968. Elvis Presley, looking for a song with which to relaunch his career, had "Suspicious Minds" played to him by Moman and recorded a version in 1969 with an almost identical arrangement. The song became a smash hit and was later listed on Rolling Stone's 500 Greatest Songs of All Time at no. 91.

=== 1969–1977: Continued success ===
In 1972 James signed a long-term contract with Screen Gems-Columbia Music. In 1973, his song "Sunday Sunrise" was recorded by American Country singer Brenda Lee. Lee's version was a huge hit and became a top ten single on charts in the US. In 1975, Canadian musician Anne Murray covered "Sunday Sunrise". Elvis Presley recorded more of James's songs, "Raised on Rock", "It's Only Love" and "Moody Blue", which was the title track to Presley's last studio album. James's greatest success came with "Always on My Mind", which he wrote with Johnny Christopher and Wayne Carson. It was issued as a b-side by Presley in 1972. In 1973, jazz-rock group Blood, Sweat & Tears released James’s "Roller Coaster" as a single from their album No Sweat. The song was recorded by David Cassidy in the same year for the last Partridge Family album Bulletin Board, which contained two other James songs, "Where Do We Go From Here" and "Alone Too Long", which he wrote with Cynthia Weil.

=== From 1978: Grammy wins, "Always on My Mind" covers, Mark James Trio ===
Mark James Trio released the album She's Gone Away in 1960 on Crazy Cajun Records, with band members Joey Longoria and Bobby Winder who cowrote with Mark James.

A decade after "Always on My Mind" was released, Willie Nelson covered it and made the song a huge hit. James won a Grammy Award for Song of the Year and Grammy Award for Best Country Song for Nelson's version. In 1987 the UK's Pet Shop Boys released a version of "Always on My Mind" which reached No. 1 in the UK and No. 4 in the US. On October 11, 2015, James entered the Nashville Songwriters Hall of Fame.

== Private life and death ==
James married his first wife, Shirley Yates, in Houston, Texas. They had a daughter. He married his second wife, Karen Taylor, in 1971. She had a daughter from her first marriage. Mark James died at his home in Nashville, Tennessee, on June 8, 2024, at the age of 83.

== Accolades ==
Year	Award	Category	Nominated work	Result	Ref.
1983	Grammy Awards	Song of the Year	"Always on My Mind"	Won	
1983	Grammy Awards	Best Country Song	"Always on My Mind"	Won	
