= Kentucky Rain =

1970 single by Elvis Presley

Single by Elvis Presley
- B-side: "My Little Friend"
- Released: January 29, 1970
- Recorded: February 19, 1969
- Studio: American Sound, Memphis
- Genre: Country, soft rock
- Length: 3:20
- Label: RCA Victor
- Songwriters: Eddie Rabbitt, Dick Heard
- Producer: Chips Moman

Elvis Presley singles chronology
| "Don't Cry Daddy" (1969) | "Kentucky Rain" (1970) | "The Wonder Of You" (1970) |

"Kentucky Rain" is a 1970 song written by Eddie Rabbitt and Dick Heard and recorded by Elvis Presley. It was recorded at American Sound Studio and features then session pianist Ronnie Milsap. Other musicians on the record include Bobby Wood on piano, Bobby Emmons on organ, Reggie Young on guitar, Tommy Cogbill on bass, and Gene Chrisman on drums. The song and session was produced by Felton Jarvis (RCA Victor) and Chips Moman (American Sound Studio of Memphis). It was certified Gold by the RIAA, signifying United States sales of more than a million copies.

== Story ==
The song's lyrics describe a man searching for a woman he loves who fled his side for an unknown reason and the protagonist's search through rural Kentucky during a persistent rain storm.

== Background ==
"Kentucky Rain" was first recorded by Elvis Presley. The single peaked at #16 on the Billboard Hot 100 pop singles chart. Released as a single on January 29, 1970, featuring "My Little Friend" as the B side, "Kentucky Rain" was one of the decade's first hits for Presley. Its first appearance on an album was in the August 1970 compilation package Worldwide 50 Gold Award Hits Vol. 1 (LPM-6401). While the track does appear on the 2000 rerelease of From Elvis in Memphis, it was not included on the original 1969 album. During Presley's February 1970 engagement in Las Vegas, he performed it some sixteen times, introducing it as a new song "out about a week." Live versions are available on the box sets Elvis Aron Presley and Live in Las Vegas.

The song is included on the CD Elvis with the Royal Philharmonic Orchestra: The Wonder of You (2016). It was published by Elvis Presley Music, Inc. and S-P-R Music Corporation. The single was certified Gold by the RIAA in March, 1992.

== Charts ==
The single peaked at #10 on the Cash Box Top 100 and #16 on the Billboard Hot 100. It also reached #6 in Canada, #21 on the UK Singles Chart, and #7 in Australia.

== Chart performance ==
| Chart (1970) | Peak position |
|---|---|
| Australian Go-Set Singles | 7 |
| Canadian RPM Top Singles | 10 |
| Canadian RPM Adult Contemporary Tracks | 4 |
| Canadian RPM Country Tracks | 1 |
| Ireland (IRMA) | 14 |
| UK Singles Chart | 21 |
| U.S. Cash Box Top 100 | 10 |
| U.S. Billboard Hot 100 | 16 |
| U.S. Billboard Easy Listening | 3 |
| U.S. Billboard Hot Country Singles | 31 |
