= In the Ghetto =

1969 single by Elvis Presley

Single by Elvis Presley

from the album From Elvis in Memphis
- B-side: "Any Day Now"
- Released: April 14, 1969
- Recorded: January 20, 1969
- Studio: American Sound, Memphis
- Genre: Country rock; folk; pop; gospel
- Length: 2:47
- Label: RCA Victor
- Songwriter: Mac Davis
- Producer: Chips Moman

Elvis Presley singles chronology
"How Great Thou Art" (1967)	"In the Ghetto" (1969)	"Clean Up Your Own Backyard" (1969)

Music video
- "In the Ghetto" (audio) on YouTube

"In the Ghetto" (originally titled "The Vicious Circle") is a 1969 song written by Mac Davis and recorded by Elvis Presley. It was released in 1969 as a part of Presley's comeback album, From Elvis in Memphis, and was also released as a single, with "Any Day Now" as its B-side.

== Background ==
The lyrics to the song were written by country music singer-songwriter Mac Davis. The version recorded by Elvis Presley is played in the key of B flat. "In the Ghetto" was recorded during Presley's session for his From Elvis in Memphis album at the American Sound Studio in Memphis, Tennessee. It was Presley's first creative recording session after his 1968 comeback special Elvis. Other hits recorded at this session were "Suspicious Minds", "Kentucky Rain", and the Davis-written "Don't Cry Daddy".

The song was published by Gladys Music, Inc., Elvis Presley's publishing company, and was Presley's first Top 10 hit in the United States in four years, peaking at number 3 on the Billboard Hot 100, and number 2 in Canada. It was his first UK Top 10 hit in three years, also peaking at No. 2 on the UK Singles Chart. It hit No. 1 on Cashbox and No. 8 Easy Listening. It was a number-one hit in West Germany, Norway, Australia, New Zealand and on the Irish Singles Chart.

== Lyrical content ==
A boy is born to a mother who already has more children than she can support in a Chicago ghetto. The boy grows up deprived, and turns to a life of delinquency through adolescence. Eventually in adulthood, the man purchases a gun and steals a car to begin a crime spree, but he is killed shortly after. The song ends with another child being born the same day in the ghetto, implying that the newborn could meet the same fate, continuing the cycle of poverty and violence.

== Charts ==
Chart (1969)	Peak position
Australia (Go-Set)	1
Austria (Ö3 Austria Top 40)	6
Belgium (Ultratop 50 Flanders)	1
Canada (RPM)	2
Denmark (Hitlisten)	3
Germany (GfK)	1
Ireland (IRMA)	1
Netherlands (Dutch Top 40)	4
New Zealand (Listener)	1
Norway (VG-lista)	1
Spain (AFYVE)	1
Sweden (Kvällstoppen)	1
Switzerland (Schweizer Hitparade)	2
UK Singles (Official Charts)	2
US Billboard Hot 100	3

== Certifications and sales ==
Region	Certification	Certified units/sales
Ireland	—	4,200
New Zealand (RMNZ)	Platinum	30,000^{‡}
United Kingdom (BPI)	Platinum	600,000^{‡}
United States (RIAA)	Platinum	1,000,000^{^}
^{^} Shipments figures based on certification alone.^{‡} Sales+streaming figures based on certification alone.

== Cover versions ==
After Elvis Presley, the song has been performed by many other artists. Dolly Parton sang the song on her 1969 album My Blue Ridge Mountain Boy. Songwriter Mac Davis recorded his own version of the song for his 1970 album Song Painter. Candi Staton recorded the song for her 1972 self titled album, and released it as a single the same year when it charted at R&B No. 12, US No. 48. In 1991, Norman Cook issued a dance version with his Beats International collective, which reached number 44 on the UK chart. In 1996, the 'Fugees-esque' hip-hop trio Ghetto People had a top ten hit on the German charts with a version recorded with local singer Detlef Malinkewitz. As Malinkewitz was recording under the pseudonym L-Viz at the time, some broadcasters in the UK credited the record to El Vez by mistake.

Gospel recording artist Reverend James Cleveland recorded a gospel version of the song, and won his first Grammy Award for Best Soul Gospel Performance at the 17th Annual Grammy Awards in 1975 with the Southern California Community Choir for his 1974 album release, In the Ghetto.

Following the death of Mac Davis, Reba McEntire and Darius Rucker recorded a duet version of the song to honor him. It was released on November 11, 2020, immediately following a live performance at the 54th Annual Country Music Association Awards.

=== Nick Cave and the Bad Seeds version ===
"In the Ghetto"

Single by Nick Cave and the Bad Seeds

from the album From Her to Eternity
- Released: June 18, 1984
- Recorded: March 1984
- Label: Mute
- Songwriter: Mac Davis
- Producer: Flood

Nick Cave and the Bad Seeds singles chronology
"In the Ghetto" (1984)	"Tupelo" (1985)

"In the Ghetto" was covered by Nick Cave and the Bad Seeds as their debut single. It was recorded at Trident Studios in London and released as a 7-inch single on June 18, 1984, with the B-side "The Moon Is in the Gutter". It reached No. 84 on the UK Singles Chart and No. 1 on the UK Independent Singles Chart. While originally not present on any album, it was later included on the CD reissue of the band's first album, From Her to Eternity.

=== DNX vs. The Voice version ===
German duo DNX vs. The Voice released "In the Ghetto" as their first single in 2005. The song was accepted in the United Kingdom and in the United States.

=== Charts ===
Chart (1984)	Peak position
UK Indie Chart	1
