= The New Gladiators (film) =

- Elvis Presley's The New Gladiators poster.
- Directed by: Bob Hammer
- Written by: Elvis Presley, Ed Parker
- Produced by: Don Warrener, Isaac Florentine
- Starring: Emil Farkas, Darnel Garcia, Roy Kurban, Ron Marchini and Benny Urquidez, and Ticky Donovan
- Narrated by: Chuck Sullivan
- Cinematography: Allen Daviau, John Hora
- Edited by: Isaac Florentine, Don Warrener
- Music by: David Crosby, Graham Nash
- Distributed by: Rising Sun Productions
- Release date: 2002
- Running time: 94 minutes
- Country: United States
- Language: English

The New Gladiators is a documentary movie by Elvis Presley and Ed Parker centered on the fights of the United States Karate team in London, England and Brussels, Belgium. Narrated by Chuck Sullivan, it was filmed between 1973 and 1974 but finally remastered and later released in 2002. The movie was financed by American singer and actor Elvis Presley, who began to practice karate during his duty years in the United States Army.

== Production ==
In 1974, George Waite presented the idea of the film to Ed Parker (no relation to Colonel Tom Parker), Presley's karate instructor. In the film, Presley was playing the main role, introducing Karate arts divided in narration and demonstrations. Parker presented the idea to Presley, who subsequently liked the idea. There was a meeting organized at Graceland, but no major details were arranged because Presley had to leave for travel to Las Vegas to perform on a show. The next morning Presley called Waite and sent his private plane to fly Waite and his wife to Vegas to complete the meeting. During the show, Presley extended a $50,000 check for beginning the production of the film. In 1977, after Presley's death, the movie was stored in a garage in West Hollywood inside the bed of a truck, along with other memorabilia objects. In 2001, the footage was found, restored, and later released on August 17, 2002. On August 16, 2009, Elvis Presley Enterprises released a new version of the film with extra footage of Presley in Karate training sessions.

== See also ==
- List of American films of 1974
