= Don't Cry Daddy =

1969 single by Elvis Presley

Single by Elvis Presley
- B-side: "Rubberneckin'"
- Released: November 11, 1969
- Recorded: January 15, 1969
- Studio: American Sound, Memphis
- Genre: Country
- Length: 2:43
- Label: RCA Victor
- Songwriter: Mac Davis
- Producer: Chips Moman

Elvis Presley singles chronology
| "Suspicious Minds" / "You'll Think of Me" (1969) | "Don't Cry Daddy" (1969) | "Kentucky Rain" (1970) |

"Don't Cry Daddy" is a 1969 song recorded by Elvis Presley written by Mac Davis. The song was paired with "Rubberneckin'" and peaked at number six in the United States Billboard Hot 100 chart in January 1970.

== Concept ==
The song takes place in the mind of the husband of the wife and mother who is no longer present (it is not stated in the lyrics whether her absence is due to death, marital separation, divorce or abandonment). The characters are the father, one of his unnamed children, and a young child named Tommy. The unnamed child begs the father not to cry, saying they will find a new "mommy", and urges the father to play with the children as they did in happier times.

== Background ==
The song was written by Mac Davis and recorded by Elvis Presley on January 15 and 21, 1969 and released as a single. The rhythm track was laid down on January 15 and Elvis' vocal overdub on the January 21. The song reached number 6 on the U.S. Billboard Hot 100 and number 8 in the UK Singles Chart. "Don't Cry Daddy" was Presley's first entry in the top 40 of Billboard's Country chart in nine years.

Live recordings were made during his second season in Las Vegas during February 1970 and several of these have been released. However, during the dinner show at the International Hotel on August 13, 1970, he recorded a version that led seamlessly into "In the Ghetto".

== Chart performance ==
| Chart (1969–70) | Peak position |
|---|---|
| New Zealand (Listener) | 3 |
| UK Singles (The Official Charts Company) | 8 |
| U.S. Billboard Easy Listening | 3 |
| U.S. Billboard Hot Country Singles | 13 |
| US Billboard Hot 100 | 6 |

== Duet ==
In 1997, Lisa Marie Presley recorded a duet of "Don't Cry Daddy" and made a video of it, where she sings it with her father. This video was presented on August 16, 1997, at the tribute concert that marked the 20th anniversary of Elvis' death. The recording has Elvis' original vocal, to which new instrumentation and Lisa Marie's vocals were added. The studio version of this duet, however, was unreleased at that time.
