= Suspicious Minds =

1968 single by Mark James

Single by Mark James
- B-side: "A Taste of Heaven"
- Released: 1968
- Recorded: 1968
- Genre: Rock
- Length: 2:47
- Label: Scepter
- Songwriter: Mark James
- Producer: Chips Moman

"Suspicious Minds" is a 1968 song written and first recorded by the American songwriter Mark James. After this recording failed commercially, it was recorded by Elvis Presley in 1969 with the producer Chips Moman. Presley's version topped the Billboard Hot 100, his 18th and final number-one single on the chart. In 1999, Presley's RCA Victor Records version was inducted into the Grammy Hall of Fame. The recording was also one of two Presley songs to be included in CBS News's list of the "250 essential American songs of the past 250 years".

== Song ==
The song is about a mistrusting and dysfunctional relationship, and the need of the characters to overcome their issues in order to maintain it. Written in 1968 by Mark James, who was also the co-writer of "Always on My Mind" (which Elvis Presley would later record), the song was first recorded and released by James on Scepter Records in 1968. Chips Moman had asked James to come to Memphis to write songs for American Sound Studio. At the time, James was residing in Houston. He had written three songs that became No.1 hits in the Southern United States. American Sound Studio was gaining a reputation in the industry, as the Box Tops had just recorded "The Letter" there, so James relocated to Memphis.

James said that late one night, he was fooling around on his Fender guitar and using his Hammond organ pedals for a bass line and came up with what he thought was a catchy melody. At the time, he was married to his first wife Shirley Yates but still had feelings for his childhood sweetheart, who was married back in Houston. James's wife had suspicions about his feelings. He felt it was a confusing time for him and that all three were "caught in this trap that they could not walk out of". At the recording session, James sang the lead vocals and the studio band backed him; Moman produced. The horns, strings, and vocals of the Holladay Sisters were later overdubbed. After the tape was mixed, James and Moman flew to New York, where James's manager had contacts with Scepter Records. The label loved the song and put it out, but Scepter did not have the money to promote new artists and the song did not make the charts.

Later that year, Don Crews, Moman's partner, told James that Presley had booked their studio to record what would become the From Elvis in Memphis album. Crews kept asking James if he had any songs that would be right for Presley. James felt Presley needed a mature rock 'n' roll song to bring him back, as Tom Jones was a popular artist at the time. Crews and James thought of "Suspicious Minds" and James began urging others to get Presley to hear it. Though James's recording had not been commercially successful, upon reviewing the song, Presley decided he could turn it into a hit.

== Elvis Presley version ==
"Suspicious Minds"

Single by Elvis Presley
- B-side: "You'll Think of Me"
- Released: August 26, 1969
- Recorded: January 22, 1969
- Studio: American Sound, Memphis
- Genre: Rock; country rock; soul; pop
- Length: 4:22
- Label: RCA Victor
- Songwriter: Mark James
- Producers: Chips Moman and Felton Jarvis

Elvis Presley singles chronology
"Clean Up Your Own Backyard" (1969)	"Suspicious Minds" / "You'll Think of Me" (1969)	"Don't Cry Daddy" (1969)

Music video
- "Suspicious Minds" (audio) on YouTube

=== Background ===
Presley had not recorded in Memphis since 1955. His 1969 recordings at American Sound Studio were a direct consequence of his '68 Comeback Special, leading Chips Moman to produce them in the singer's new style; Presley was making his comeback to the Memphis musical scene by recording rock, gospel, country, rhythm & blues, and soul. Marty Lacker, a close friend of Elvis, suggested "Suspicious Minds" at the studio. The sessions that followed produced the album From Elvis in Memphis.

=== American Sound Studio session ===
"Suspicious Minds" was a product of a session that took place between 4 and 7 a.m. on Thursday, January 23, 1969. James was in Memphis, but he was not at the recording session. A few days earlier, he had walked into the recording studio during a session and sensed that Presley was uncomfortable with his presence. James did not want to jinx the song, so he stayed away. When he heard the track the day after it was recorded, he initially thought it sounded too slow. When he later heard the embellished version, he said he was blown away. In later years, whenever Presley saw James, he would cross the room to say hello.

Production of the song was nearly scuttled over a copyright dispute. Presley's business people Hill & Range said they wanted half of Moman's publishing rights. Moman accused them of stealing and threatened to halt the recording session. Harry Jenkins of RCA agreed with Moman because he sensed that "the song would be a big hit and there would be plenty to go around". The songs "I'll Hold You in My Heart (Till I Can Hold You in My Arms)", "Without Love (There Is Nothing)", and "I'll Be There" were recorded in the same session. On August 7, "Suspicious Minds" was again overdubbed to stereo and mono in Las Vegas, where the final master was produced by Bill Porter. The song's time signature changes in the bridge section, from 4/4 to the slower 6/8, then back again to the faster 4/4 rhythm. The instrumental arrangement uses an electric guitar, bass guitar, organ, strings, trumpets, trombones, and drums. As Parade magazine wrote in a survey of some of Presley's biggest hits, the recording "boasts one of the most innovative arrangements in Elvis' career ... two time-signature changes, a jangling electric guitar, spiraling strings, pumping horns and a barreling backup choir".

RCA staff producer Felton Jarvis decided to add a fade-out to the song starting at 3:36 and lasting for nearly 15 seconds before fading back in. The first verse then continues repeatedly until the song completely fades out at 4:22. In a 2012 interview with Marc Myers of The Wall Street Journal, Moman disclosed that Jarvis was never happy with Presley recording at American Sound Studio, saying "it was a control thing". He added: "So when Jarvis took the tape of 'Suspicious Minds', he added this crazy 15-second fade toward the end, like the song was ending, and brought it back by overdubbing to extend it. I have no idea why he did that, but he messed it up. It was like a scar. None of which mattered. Soon after the song was released, Elvis was back on top of the charts."

Future Grateful Dead vocalist Donna Jean Godchaux sang backing vocals on the track.

"Suspicious Minds" was one of the singles that revived Presley's chart success in the US, following his '68 Comeback Special. It was his 18th and last Billboard Hot 100 No.1 single in the United States. In 2004, Rolling Stone ranked it No. 91 on their list of the 500 Greatest Songs of All Time. Session guitarist Reggie Young played on both the James and Presley versions.

The song was later included on the legacy edition of From Elvis in Memphis and the Follow That Dream reissue of Back In Memphis.

=== Personnel ===
Sourced from Keith Flynn.

- Elvis Presley – lead and harmony vocals; guitar (uncertain)
- Reggie Young – guitar
- Mike Leech – bass
- Bobby Wood – piano
- Bobby Emmons – organ
- Gene Chrisman – drums
- Art Vasquez, Norman Prentice, Bobby Shew – trumpets
- Archie LeCoque, Johnny Boice – trombones
- Kenneth Adkins – bass trombone
- Glen Spreen – string and horn arrangements
- Donna Thatcher (Godchaux), Mary "Jeannie" Greene, Ginger Holladay, Mary Holladay – backing vocals

=== Release and performances ===
Presley first performed the song at the Las Vegas International Hotel (later renamed the Hilton) on July 31, 1969, and the 45 rpm single was released 26 days later. It reached No.1 on the US Billboard Hot 100 for the week of November 1 and stayed there for one week. It would be Presley's final No.1 single on the Billboard Hot 100, before his death ("Burning Love" in 1972 was a No.1 hit on the Cashbox chart; "The Wonder Of You" in 1970, "Way Down" in 1977, and Junkie XL's remix of "A Little Less Conversation" in 2002 all hit No.1 on the UK Singles Chart, followed by re-issues of several previous chart-toppers in 2005).

=== Charts ===
==== Weekly ====
Chart (1969)	Peak position
Australia (Go-Set)	1
Austria (Ö3 Austria Top 40)	1
Belgium (Ultratop 50 Flanders)	1
Belgium (Ultratop 50 Wallonia)	4
Canada Top Singles (RPM)	1
Canada Adult Contemporary (RPM)	3
Germany (GfK)	7
Ireland (IRMA)	2
Netherlands (Dutch Top 40)	6
Netherlands (Single Top 100)	4
New Zealand (Listener)	1
Norway (VG-lista)	10
South Africa (Springbok)	1
Sweden (Sverigetopplistan)	1
Switzerland (Schweizer Hitparade)	2
UK Singles (Official Charts)	2
US Billboard Hot 100	1
US Adult Contemporary (Billboard)	4

==== Year-end ====
Chart (1969)	Rank
Canada Top Singles (RPM)	9
US Billboard Hot 100	18

=== Certifications ===
Region	Certification	Certified units/sales
Denmark (IFPI Danmark)	Gold	45,000^{‡}
Italy (FIMI)	Gold	25,000^{*}
Mexico (AMPROFON)	Gold	30,000^{*}
New Zealand (RMNZ)	2× Platinum	60,000^{‡}
Spain (Promusicae)	Gold	30,000^{‡}
United Kingdom (BPI)	3× Platinum	1,800,000^{‡}
United States (RIAA)	Platinum	1,000,000^{^}
^{*} Sales figures based on certification alone.^{^} Shipments figures based on certification alone.^{‡} Sales+streaming figures based on certification alone.

== Fine Young Cannibals version ==
"Suspicious Minds"

Single by Fine Young Cannibals

from the album Fine Young Cannibals
- B-side: "Prick Up Your Ears"
- Released: January 2, 1986
- Genre: Rock
- Length: 3:58
- Label: London, I.R.S.
- Songwriter: Mark James
- Producer: Robin Millar

Fine Young Cannibals singles chronology
"Blue" (1986)	"Suspicious Minds" (1986)	"Funny How Love Is" (1986)

In 1986, the band Fine Young Cannibals' cover version, which features backing vocals by Jimmy Somerville, reached No. 8 on the UK Singles Chart. The video of the song was filmed in black and white and is mostly shown that way, only colorized following the bridge section. It pays homage to Elvis Presley in its monochromaticity (common during his early career) and the shiny spangled suits the band wears in the second half.

=== Charts ===
==== Weekly ====
Chart (1986)	Peak position
Australia (Kent Music Report)	6
Belgium (Ultratop 50 Flanders)	22
Canada Top Singles (RPM)	21
Europe (European Hot 100 Singles)	25
Ireland (IRMA)	9
Netherlands (Dutch Top 40)	31
Netherlands (Single Top 100)	21
New Zealand (Recorded Music NZ)	14
UK Singles (Official Charts)	8
US 12-inch Singles Sales (Billboard)	49
US Dance/Disco Club Play (Billboard)	23
West Germany (GfK)	37

==== Year-end ====
Chart (1986)	Position
Australia (Kent Music Report)	77

== Dwight Yoakam version ==
"Suspicious Minds"

Single by Dwight Yoakam

from the album Honeymoon in Vegas Soundtrack
- Released: 1992
- Genre: Country
- Length: 3:51
- Label: Epic
- Songwriter: Mark James
- Producer: Pete Anderson

Dwight Yoakam singles chronology
"Send a Message to My Heart" (1992)	"Suspicious Minds" (1992)	"Ain't That Lonely Yet" (1993)

In 1992, country singer Dwight Yoakam recorded his version, for the soundtrack of the film Honeymoon in Vegas, and also filmed an accompanying video. The track was later released on his 2004 compilation album The Very Best of Dwight Yoakam.

=== Charts ===
Chart (1992)	Peak position
Australia (ARIA)	129
Canada Country Singles (RPM)	51
US Hot Country Songs (Billboard)	35

== Gareth Gates version ==
"Suspicious Minds"

Single by Gareth Gates

from the album What My Heart Wants to Say
- A-side: "The Long and Winding Road"
- Released: September 23, 2002
- Recorded: 2002
- Genre: Pop
- Length: 3:52: 19; S; RCA; BMG
- Songwriter: Mark James
- Producer: Steve Mac

Gareth Gates singles chronology
"Anyone of Us (Stupid Mistake)" (2002)	"The Long and Winding Road" / "Suspicious Minds" (2002)	"What My Heart Wants to Say" (2002)

Music video
- "Suspicious Minds" by Gareth Gates on YouTube

Gareth Gates, the runner-up of the first series of the ITV talent show Pop Idol, released a cover version of "Suspicious Minds" on BMG-related record labels on September 23, 2002. The single is a double-A side record containing a cover of the Beatles' "The Long and Winding Road" performed with Pop Idol series one winner Will Young. The single topped the UK Singles Chart, where it stayed for two consecutive weeks. The music video features Gates changing color, alternating between black and white in a white background, while clips from the 2002 film Lilo & Stitch are shown.

=== Charts ===
==== Weekly ====
Chart (2002)	Peak position
Europe (Eurochart Hot 100)	9
Ireland (IRMA)	4
Scottish Singles Sales (Official Charts)	1
UK Singles (Official Charts)	1

==== Year-end ====
Chart (2002)	Position
UK Singles (OCC)	22

=== Certifications ===
Region	Certification	Certified units/sales
United Kingdom (BPI)	Gold	400,000^{^}
^{^} Shipments figures based on certification alone.

== Warwick, Jennings and Staton versions ==
Dee Dee Warwick, Dionne Warwick's sister, covered "Suspicious Minds" in 1970. Warwick's version was a minor US pop hit, peaking at No. 80 in 1970. It reached No. 24 on the Billboard R&B chart for May 8, 1971.

Waylon Jennings and Jessi Colter recorded the song for RCA in 1970. Their version reached No. 25 on the Billboard Country chart in November of that year. The Jennings-Colter version was re-released by RCA in 1976, topping out at No. 2, and was included on the album Wanted! The Outlaws that same year. Their version was nominated for a Grammy Award for Best Country Performance by a Duo or Group with Vocal at the 13th Annual Grammy Awards.

Candi Staton had a No. 31 UK hit with her revival in 1982.
