= Chips Moman =

American songwriter (1937–2016)

- Born: Lincoln Wayne Moman; June 12, 1937; LaGrange, Georgia, U.S.
- Died: June 13, 2016 (aged 79) LaGrange, Georgia, U.S.
- Genres: Record producer, guitarist, songwriter, recording engineer
- Years active: 1950–2016

Lincoln Wayne "Chips" Moman (June 12, 1937 – June 13, 2016) was an American record producer, guitarist, and songwriter. He is known for working in R&B, pop music and country music, operating American Sound Studios and producing hit albums like Elvis Presley's 1969 From Elvis in Memphis and the 1985 debut album for The Highwaymen. Moman won a Grammy Award for co-writing "(Hey Won't You Play) Another Somebody Done Somebody Wrong Song", a 1975 hit for B.J. Thomas.

== Music career ==
=== Early years ===
Moman was born in LaGrange, Georgia. After moving to Memphis, Tennessee, as a teenager, he played in the road band of Warren Smith, before moving to Los Angeles around 1957 with Johnny Burnette's band and then touring with Gene Vincent. While in Los Angeles, he played guitar on sessions recorded at the Gold Star Studios.

=== 1960s ===
Returning to Memphis, he began an association with Satellite Records (later Stax Records), helping find the disused movie theater on McLemore Avenue that became the Stax headquarters. He worked as the company's recording engineer and produced their first hit single, Carla Thomas's 1960 "Gee Whiz (Look at His Eyes)". He also produced the first single for the Stax subsidiary label Volt, "Burnt Biscuits" b/w "Raw Dough," by the Triumphs, whose members included future soul star Al Green and drummer Howard Grimes. Leaving Stax in 1964 after a monetary dispute with label founder Jim Stewart, he began operating his own Memphis recording studio, American Sound Studio.

At American Sound, he, along with guitarists Reggie Young and Bobby Womack, bassists Tommy Cogbill and Mike Leech, pianists and organists Bobby Woods and Bobby Emmons, and drummer Gene Chrisman, recorded the Box Tops ("Soul Deep"), Bobby Womack, Merrilee Rush, Mark Lindsay (Paul Revere and the Raiders), Sandy Posey (notably "Born a Woman" and "Single Girl"), Joe Tex, Wilson Pickett, Herbie Mann, Roy Hamilton, and Petula Clark. During this period Moman established a songwriting partnership with fellow Memphis producer and songwriter Dan Penn. The pair co-wrote "Do Right Woman, Do Right Man", recorded by Aretha Franklin, and "The Dark End of the Street", which became the best-known song of the soul singer James Carr. Moman also played guitar on Franklin's recording sessions at the FAME Studios in Muscle Shoals.

In the 1960s, Moman worked for Stax Records before founding the American Sound Studio in Memphis, Tennessee, and later worked extensively in Nashville. As a record producer, Moman was known for recording Elvis Presley, Tammy Wynette, Bobby Womack, Carla Thomas, and Merrilee Rush, as well as guiding the career of the Box Tops. As a songwriter, he was responsible for standards associated with Aretha Franklin, James Carr, Waylon Jennings, and B. J. Thomas, including the Grammy-winning "(Hey Won't You Play) Another Somebody Done Somebody Wrong Song". He was also a session guitarist for Franklin and other musicians.

=== 1970s ===
During the late 1960s and early 1970s, American Sound became one of the most successful recording studios in the country, producing more than 120 charting singles by pop, soul, and country artists and at one point contributing over a quarter of the hits on the Billboard Hot 100. Moman produced Elvis Presley's 1969 album, From Elvis in Memphis – described as "arguably [Presley's] best album". Recording sessions for the album produced hit songs "In the Ghetto", "Suspicious Minds", and "Kentucky Rain," though the latter two did not appear on the album itself. During this time, Moman had a record label American Group Records (AGP), distributed by Amy-Mala-Bell.

Moman left Memphis in 1971 and briefly operated a studio in Atlanta. He moved to Nashville, where he married fellow songwriter Toni Wine, and where he produced and (with fellow producer Larry Butler) co-wrote a hit for B. J. Thomas, "(Hey Won't You Play) Another Somebody Done Somebody Wrong Song" (1975). This effort earned Moman a Grammy Award. He also co-wrote "Luckenbach, Texas (Back to the Basics of Love)" for Waylon Jennings, and produced albums by Willie Nelson, Gary Stewart, Tammy Wynette, Ronnie Milsap, and Petula Clark.

=== Later years ===
After a brief return to Memphis in the mid-1980s, during which time his attempt to open a new studio floundered, he settled in LaGrange, Georgia, where he operated another recording studio.

Moman recorded the first demo cut on the song "Always on My Mind". Mark James was working for him as a session musician and Wayne Carson was in the studio recording songs, Carson asking the co-writers to add a bridge to the song that Moman insisted it needed. The musicians felt the song was complete, but Moman refused to record it unless they came up with a bridge on the studio's old piano. The two-line bridge was then added. The song was passed to Elvis via a bodyguard and, consequently, it was not recorded by the studio despite originating in it. However, Moman produced Willie Nelson's version years later. Moman also produced Highwayman, the first studio album released by country supergroup The Highwaymen, comprising Kris Kristofferson, Johnny Cash, Waylon Jennings, and Willie Nelson. Highwayman, released through Columbia Records in 1985, was the group's first and most successful album.

== Death ==
Moman died on 13 June 2016, the day after his 79th birthday, at a hospice in LaGrange, Georgia. He had been suffering from a lung disease and died of emphysema.
