= American Sound Studio =

US recording studio (1967–1972) located at 827 Thomas Street in Memphis, Tennessee

Coordinates: 35.163844°N 90.036715°W

- Industry: recording studio
- Founded: 1964
- Defunct: 1972
- Successor: American Studios
- Headquarters: Memphis, Tennessee
- Key people: Chips Moman Don Crews

The American Sound Studio was a recording studio located in Memphis, Tennessee which operated from 1964 to 1972. Founded by Chips Moman, the studio at 827 Thomas Street came to be known as American North, and the studio at 2272 Deadrick Street came to be known as American East or the Annex.

More than one hundred hit songs were recorded at these studios, with backing provided by the studio musicians "The Memphis Boys", also known as the "827 Thomas Street Band". Artists who recorded at American included Elvis Presley, Joe Tex, Wilson Pickett, Bobby Womack, Joe Simon, Merrilee Rush, Aretha Franklin, Oscar Toney Jr., Neil Diamond, Dusty Springfield, B. J. Thomas, Petula Clark, Roy Hamilton, and The Box Tops.

In 2011, producer/engineer Brad Dunn and partners, seeking to preserve its recording history legacy, reopened the American East location as American Recording Studio.

== History ==
=== Beginnings on Thomas Street ===
American Sound Studio was started in 1964 at 827 Thomas Street in North Memphis by producer Chips Moman and Don Crews. Between 1967 and 1971 approximately 120 hit songs were produced, and listed in the top 100 of Billboard, at the American Sound Studio. During one week span, 25% of Billboard's top 100 not only came from the same studio, but featured the same band backing a variety of artists. It was further noted that the Memphis Boys recorded 122 Top 10 records using the same rhythm team, and were also known as the “827 Thomas Street Band” after the address of the studio.

The first American Sound Studio facility on Thomas Street was closed in 1972 and the building was torn down in 1989. In its place is a Family Dollar store with a County historical marker. Moman moved first to Atlanta, and then to Nashville,opening and operating American Recording Studio facilities in each city. Neither location remains today. Chips Moman changed the name too American Recording Studios in 1967 when the second studio was opened in Memphis. In 1968 Chip's ran full page advertisement in the trade Magazine Billboard. Chips had announced the name change in 1967 in the Industry news section of Billboard.

=== American Recording Studio East ===
American Sound Studios and the Memphis Boys were in high demand, and had to use other studios in Memphis, such as Royal Studios (where "Dark End of the Street" was recorded), Sounds of Memphis, Ardent Studios, National Street Studios, Lyn Lou Studios, and Fame Studios in Muscle Shoals, Alabama. By acquiring a second studio they could keep most productions in house.

They found a studio located at 2272 Deadrick Avenue in East Memphis. Designed and built in 1967 as Onyx, with construction commissioned by Steve Sholes of RCA Records, it was the first purpose-built recording studio in Memphis. Onyx was utilized by different record companies. The studio's staff included Ronnie "Angel" Stoots from the Mar-Keys and George Klein. The first single cut there was "Mama"/"Merry Go Round" produced by Bobby Manuel. By 1968 the studio became popular with Jerry Wexler and Tom Dowd of Atlantic Records, as well as Dot Records/Paramount Records. In November 1968 Moman and Crews ran a full page advertisement in Billboard to announce the new studio acquisition and operation of both their "North" and "East" studios.

Moman and Don Crews purchased Onyx in December 1968, renaming it American Recording Studio East, AKA “The Annex”. The studio was custom-designed with stereo echo chambers, and its new large tracking floor made it well suited for larger productions such as horn and orchestra sessions (Presley's "Kentucky Rain" arranged by Glen Spreen, is an example). Wayne Jackson recorded there as part of the Memphis Horns, including the trumpet part on Neil Diamond's "Sweet Caroline". The studio had easy access to the Memphis International Airport, and next door was the Memphis landmark John Grisanti's restaurant.

American East helped complete many of the productions made at American's North Memphis studio between 1968 and 1972. Both studios were fitted with similar equipment which allowed the easy transfer of tapes, and were able to operate all day and night to handle the demand. So much more work could be done, as Moman quoted to Billboard magazine. Moman also liked to work in anonymity during these years and the East location served that purpose well.

In 1972 Moman and Crews made arrangements to dissolve their partnership and crews restored American East back to Onyx. Following Don Crews' retirement in 1978, Onyx was purchased by musicians/producers Doyle and Bernice Turner. STAX's studio had closed by 1975, and from 1978 to 1988 Onyx was the studio for ex-STAX engineer and producer Allen Jones (the Bar-Kays, Isaac Hayes, Albert King, Kwik), and the studio home for the Bar-Kays.

By 1990 the studio was leased to producers Doug Easley and Davis McCain, and known as Easley McCain Recording from 1990 to 2005. Under the direction of producers Easley, McCain and Stuart Sikes, the studio was used by acts including Alex Chilton, Tav Falco, Rufus Thomas, The White Stripes, Loretta Lynn, Wilco, and Jeff Buckley. In 2005 the studio suffered a major fire and Easley McCain relocated to new premises in 2009.

The now-vacant fire-damaged Deadrick studio was bought by an out-of-state developer. After negotiating with the developer to protect this Memphis landmark, custodial power was given to Brad Dunn in 2006 to campaign to get the studio reopened. Brad was supported by his father, Robert, and his uncle, Donald "Duck" Dunn, and sought input from Chips Moman, Don and Erick Crews on preserving the historical site. A trust was set up by new owner David Gicking & partner Brad Dunn to preserve the studio's future. Following a detailed restoration, the first phase was completed in 2011.

Brad Dunn (producer, engineer), Matt Martone and Will Gilbert (engineer) re-opened the studio in 2011 as American Recording Studio. Owned by David Glicking and Brad Dunn, American Recording Studio is the only remaining physical location of the American Sound Studios legacy.

== Recording artists ==
In January 1969, Elvis Presley recorded his last number one hit "Suspicious Minds" with producer/engineer Chips Moman. Around this time, American Sound Studio was at the top of its game, in the middle of a three-year span that would yield more than 100 hit records for artists that included B. J. Thomas, Neil Diamond, and Dusty Springfield.

=== The Memphis Boys ===
The studio's house band, known both as the 827 Thomas Street Band and (informally) as the Memphis Boys, consisted of Reggie Young on guitar, Tommy Cogbill and Mike Leech on bass, Gene Chrisman on drums, Bobby Wood on piano, and Bobby Emmons on organ. They brought versatility to the studio, including Joe Tex's "Skinny Legs and All","I Gotcha"; Wilson Pickett's "I'm in Love"; Joe Simon's "Hangin' On"; The Box Tops' "Cry Like a Baby"; Neil Diamond's "Sweet Caroline"; Merrilee Rush's "Angel of the Morning"; Elvis Presley's "In the Ghetto"; and Danny O'Keefe's "Good Time Charlie's Got the Blues". It was Tommy Cogbill's bass ride out in Dusty Springfield's hit "Son of a Preacher Man." They were also the band in flutist Herbie Mann's 1969 Jazz Rock classic Memphis Underground. In 2007, they were inducted into the Musicians Hall of Fame and Museum in Nashville, TN.

=== Bobby Womack ===
Bobby Womack worked at producer Chips Moman's American Sound Studio in Memphis, and played on recordings by Joe Tex and The Box Tops. Until this point, around 1967, he had had little success as a solo artist, but at American he began to record a string of hit singles, including 1968's "What Is This" (his first chart hit), "It's Gonna Rain", and "More Than I Can Stand". During this period he became known as a songwriter, contributing many songs to Wilson Pickett's repertoire; these include "I'm in Love" and "I'm a Midnight Mover." He also played guitar on three of Aretha Franklin's hit-making late 1960s recordings, including the Lady Soul album, and "Chain of Fools". Among his appearances as a session musician from this period are Sly & the Family Stone's 1971 album There's a Riot Goin' On, and Janis Joplin's Pearl, which features a song by Womack and Michael McClure entitled "Trust Me". In 1971, on an album with jazz guitarist Gábor Szabó, he recorded the instrumental "Breezin'", which later became a hit for George Benson.

=== Joe Tex ===
Joe Tex recorded his major hit, "Skinny Legs and All"(1967), and "I Gotcha"(1972), at American Sound Studio. "I Gotcha" was originally intended to be recorded by King Floyd, but Floyd never recorded a version of it. Instead, Tex went ahead and recorded it himself in the late 1960s, but ended up not releasing it. He decided to re-record the song in late 1971 at American Sound Studio and released it as the B-side of "A Mother's Prayer," the first single off his 1972 album that was also titled I Gotcha. Radio DJs decided to flip the single over and started playing "I Gotcha." This would result in Tex having his first major hit in five years as "I Gotcha" eventually peaked at number one on the R&B chart and number two on the Pop chart and would sell around three million copies.

=== Elvis Presley ===
In January and February 1969, Elvis Presley recorded an extensive number of tracks during a period known as his comeback. One notable track, and the first to be released, was "In the Ghetto", unusual in Presley's repertoire for its social commentary on the cycle of crime and poverty, followed by "Suspicious Minds", which became a centerpiece of his live performances that would begin that year. Indeed, four charting singles came from these sessions- "Suspicious Minds", "Don't Cry Daddy", "In the Ghetto", and "Kentucky Rain" —as well as two critically acclaimed albums released during 1969, From Elvis in Memphis and the studio portion of From Memphis to Vegas/From Vegas to Memphis, also the strings and horns were scored at American East Studio. Mike Leach and Glen Spreen did most of the arranging, “sweetening” the tracks at American East. The studio portion of From Memphis to Vegas/From Vegas to Memphis was later released separately as Back in Memphis in 1970. Additional tracks recorded during the 1969 sessions would continue to appear haphazardly on assorted Elvis albums as late as 1972, including a cover version of The Beatles' "Hey Jude".

=== B. J. Thomas ===
B. J. Thomas made his name in the mid-1960s with easy listening hits like "Hooked on a Feeling" and "Raindrops Keep Fallin' on My Head" recorded at American Sound Studio. The song "Raindrops Keep Fallin' on My Head", written by Hal David and Burt Bacharach for the 1969 film Butch Cassidy and the Sundance Kid, won an Academy Award for Best Original Song. Further, David and Bacharach won Best Original Score. The version by B. J. Thomas was number one on the Billboard Hot 100 chart in the United States in January 1970 for four weeks and the first No. 1 single of the 1970s. It also spent seven weeks atop the U.S. adult contemporary chart.

The song was recorded in seven takes, after Bacharach expressed dissatisfaction with the first six.

=== Dusty Springfield ===
The sudden changes of pop music in the mid-1960s left female singers out of fashion. To boost her credibility as a soul artist, Dusty Springfield went to Memphis, Tennessee to record an album of pop and soul music at American Sound Studio. The LP Dusty in Memphis earned Springfield a nomination for a Grammy Award for Best Female Pop Vocal Performance in 1970 and received the Grammy Hall of Fame Award in 2001. International readers and viewers polls list the record among the one hundred greatest albums of all time. The LP's standout track "Son of a Preacher Man" was an international Top 10 hit in 1969.

=== The Box Tops ===
The Box Tops recorded Wayne Carson Thompson's "The Letter". Under two minutes in length, it was an international hit in late 1967, reaching Billboard's number-one position and remaining there for four weeks. Produced by Dan Penn and featuring 16-year-old vocalist Alex Chilton, the single sold over four million copies and received two Grammy Awards nominations. Their single "Cry Like a Baby" was a major hit in 1968, peaking at number two on Billboard. Some of their recordings' instrumental tracks were performed by session musicians like Reggie Young, Tommy Cogbill, Gene Chrisman, and Bobby Womack at Moman's American Sound Studio, and by future Chilton producer Terry Manning at Ardent Studios, although the actual group members performed on a number of the recordings, including their first hit "The Letter", and on all live performances.

=== Neil Diamond ===
"Sweet Caroline", recorded at American Sound Studio, was Neil Diamond's first major hit after his slump. Wayne Jackson of The Memphis Horns recorded his trumpet part at the Annex, American East.

== See also ==
- Booker T and the MGs
- The Funk Brothers
- Muscle Shoals Rhythm Section
- FAME Studios
