= Elvis' Gold Records Volume 5 =

Greatest hits album by Elvis Presley
- Released: March 1984
- Recorded: January 1969–October 1976 (original version): September 1967 to October 1976 (reissue version)
- Genre: Rock
- Length: 30:09 (original release); 46:00 (reissue)
- Label: RCA Victor
- Producer: Joan Deary

Elvis Presley chronology
Elvis: A Legendary Performer Volume 4 (1983)	Elvis' Gold Records Volume 5 (1984)	Elvis: The First Live Recordings (1984)

Elvis' Gold Records Volume 5 is the final album in the RCA Victor Golden/Gold Records series by American singer and musician Elvis Presley (which began in 1958), and the only volume in the series to be issued posthumously. The album was released by RCA Records in March 1984 on both LP and compact disc. The album is a compilation of hit singles released between 1968 and 1977. It is the only one of the series to not appear on the Billboard album chart, "bubbling under" at #207 for two weeks. It was certified Gold on 7/15/1999 by the RIAA.

== Content ==
Gold Records Volume 5 comprises nine Top 40 A-sides along with one b-side, "For the Heart" from 1976. Released more than sixteen years since the previous installment in the series, it covers a span of almost ten years. The first side of the album focused on Elvis' late 1960s comeback-era recordings: "If I Can Dream" was taken from his comeback special, three singles from the American studios sessions "Suspicious Minds", "Kentucky Rain", and "In The Ghetto", and "Clean Up Your Own Backyard" was a soundtrack recording from The Trouble with Girls. The second side contained Elvis' late period singles including "Burning Love" and "Moody Blue". RCA apparently did not base the track selection solely on commercial factors, as two top ten hit singles from this time period, "Don't Cry Daddy" from 1969 and "The Wonder of You" from 1970, were omitted.

Originally recorded at RCA Studio B in Nashville, Tennessee, RCA Studio C in Hollywood, Western Recorders in Burbank, California, Stax Studio and in The Jungle Room in Memphis, Tennessee. Original recordings produced by Felton Jarvis, Chips Moman, Bones Howe and Billy Strange.

== Reissues ==
RCA reissued the album on July 15, 1997, and added six bonus tracks taken from a three-year span from 1967 to 1970, including three additional Top 40 singles. The original album sequence was largely left intact, though "If I Can Dream" was moved to the end of the disc. RCA's selection of bonus tracks is somewhat puzzling as it features several of Elvis' pre-comeback recordings, rather than 1970s hits; "Always On My Mind", "Promised Land", "Steamroller Blues", "Separate Ways", "Hurt", "T-R-O-U-B-L-E", "I Really Don't Want To Know", and "Until It's Time for You to Go" were among Elvis' top forty hits during the decade. Inexplicably, “The Wonder of You” and “Don’t Cry Daddy”, both top 10 hits in 1970, were still not included on the reissued expanded version.

Only "Memories" which was featured on Elvis' comeback special and "You Don't Have To Say You Love Me", a top twenty single in 1970 are consistent with the selection from the original album. Three of the bonus tracks are from soundtrack recordings. "Big Boss Man" and "Guitar Man" were originally released as top 40 singles and as bonus songs on the Clambake album. "Edge of Reality" is from Live a Little, Love a Little (it was also the B-side to "If I Can Dream"). The remaining track, "U.S. Male" was a 1968 single.

Professional ratings
Review scores
Source	Rating
Allmusic	4.5/5 stars

== Track listing ==
Chart positions taken from the Billboard singles chart

=== Original release ===
Side one
No.	Z	Song Title	Writer(s)	Recorded	Catalogue	Release date	Chart Peak	Time
1.		"Suspicious Minds"	Mark James	January 22, 1969	47-9764	August 26, 1969	1	3:28
2.		"Kentucky Rain"	Eddie Rabbitt and Dick Heard	February 19, 1969	47-9791	January 29, 1970	16	3:14
3.		"In the Ghetto"	Mac Davis	January 20, 1969	47-9741	April 14, 1969	3	2:45
4.		"Clean Up Your Own Backyard"	Billy Strange and Mac Davis	October 23, 1968	47-9747	June 17, 1969	35	3:07
5.		"If I Can Dream"	Walter Earl Brown	June 23, 1968	47-9670	November 5, 1968	12	3:11
Side two
No.	Z	Song Title	Writer(s)	Recorded	Catalogue	Release date	Chart Peak	Time
1.		"Burning Love"	Dennis Linde	March 28, 1972	74-0769	August 1, 1972	2	2:50
2.		"If You Talk In Your Sleep"	Red West and Johnny Christopher	December 11, 1973	APBO 0280	May 10, 1974	17	2:34
3.		"For the Heart"	Dennis Linde	February 5, 1976	PB 10601b	March 12, 1976	̶	3:22
4.		"Moody Blue"	Mark James	February 4, 1976	PB 10857	November 29, 1976	31	3:22
5.		"Way Down"	Layng Martine Jr.	October 29, 1976	PB 10998	June 6, 1977	18	2:38
=== 1997 CD reissue ===
No.	Z	Song Title	Writer(s)	Recorded	Catalogue	Release date	Chart Peak	Time
1.		"Suspicious Minds"	Mark James	January 22, 1969	47-9764	August 26, 1969	1	3:28
2.		"Kentucky Rain"	Eddie Rabbitt and Dick Heard	February 19, 1969	47-9791	January 29, 1970	16	3:14
3.		"In the Ghetto"	Mac Davis	January 20, 1969	47-9741	April 14, 1969	3	2:45
4.		"Clean Up Your Own Backyard"	Billy Strange and Mac Davis	October 23, 1968	47-9747	June 17, 1969	35	3:07
5.		"Burning Love"	Dennis Linde	March 28, 1972	74-0769	August 1, 1972	2	2:50
6.		"If You Talk In Your Sleep"	Red West and Johnny Christopher	December 11, 1973	APBO 0280	May 10, 1974	17	2:34
7.		"For the Heart"	Dennis Linde	February 5, 1976	PB 10601b	March 12, 1976	̶	3:22
8.		"Moody Blue"	Mark James	February 4, 1976	PB 10857	November 29, 1976	31	3:22
9.		"Way Down"	Layng Martine Jr.	October 29, 1976	PB 10998	June 6, 1977	18	2:38
10.		"Big Boss Man"	Luther Dixon and Al Smith	September 10, 1967	47-9341	September 26, 1967	38	2:50
11.		"Guitar Man"	Jerry Reed	September 10, 1967	47-9425	January 9, 1968	43	2:12
12.		"U.S. Male"	Jerry Reed	January 16, 1968	47-9465	February 28, 1968	28	2:42
13.		"You Don't Have to Say You Love Me"	Vicki Wickham, Simon Napier-Bell, Pino Donaggio, Vito Pallavicini	June 6, 1970	47-9916	October 6, 1970	11	2:30
14.		"Edge of Reality"	Bernie Baum, Bill Giant, Florence Kaye	March 7, 1968	47-9670b	November 5, 1968	̶	3:33
15.		"Memories"	Billy Strange and Mac Davis	June 23, 1968	47-9731	February 25, 1969	35	3:03
16.		"If I Can Dream"	Walter Earl Brown	June 23, 1968	47-9670	November 5, 1968	12	3:11

== Personnel ==
- Elvis Presley – lead vocals
- Scotty Moore – guitar
- Chip Young – guitar
- James Burton – guitar
- John Wilkinson – guitar
- Charlie Hodge – guitar, backing vocals
- Jerry Reed – guitar
- Mike Deasy – guitar
- Tommy Tedesco – guitar
- Harold Bradley – guitar, six-string bass
- Gerry McGee – guitar
- Morton Marker – guitar
- Joseph Gibbons – guitar
- Neil LeVang – guitar
- Charles Britz – guitar
- Al Casey – guitar
- Dennis Linde – guitar
- Billy Sanford – guitar
- Reggie Young – guitar
- Ed Kollis – harmonica
- Charlie McCoy – guitar, organ, harmonica
- Pete Drake – steel guitar
- Floyd Cramer – piano
- Glen D. Hardin – piano
- Don Randi – piano
- David Briggs – piano
- Bobby Wood – piano
- Bobby Emmons – organ
- Bob Moore – bass
- Larry Knechtel – bass
- Charles Berghofer – bass
- Max Bennett – bass
- Norbert Putnam – bass
- Emory Gordy – bass
- Jerry Scheff – bass
- Tommy Cogbill – bass
- Mike Leech – bass
- D. J. Fontana – drums
- Buddy Harman – drums
- Hal Blaine – drums
- Gary Coleman – drums
- Frank Carlson – drums
- John Guerin – drums
- Jerry Carrigan – drums
- Ronnie Tutt – drums
- Gene Chrisman – drums
- Boots Randolph – saxophone
- The Jordanaires – backing vocals
- J.D. Sumner and the Stamps – backing vocals
- Millie Kirkham – backing vocals
- The Blossoms – backing vocals
- B.J. Baker – backing vocals
- Sally Stevens – backing vocals
- Bob Tebow – backing vocals
- John Bahler – backing vocals
- Dolores Edgin – backing vocals
- June Page – backing vocals
- Kathy Westmoreland – backing vocals
- Joe Babcock – backing vocals
- Dolores Edgin – backing vocals
- Mary Greene – backing vocals
- Ginger Holladay – backing vocals
- Mary Holladay – backing vocals
- June Page – backing vocals
- Susan Pilkington – backing vocals
- Sandy Posey – backing vocals
- Donna Thatcher – backing vocals
- Hurschel Wiginton – backing vocals
