= Elvis (1968 album) =

Live album by Elvis Presley
- Released: December 1968
- Recorded: June 20–30, 1968
- Venue: NBC Studios (Burbank)
- Studio: Western Recorders (Hollywood)
- Genre: Rock and roll; R&B; country; gospel
- Length: 44:27
- Label: RCA Victor
- Producer: Bones Howe, Steve Binder

Elvis Presley chronology
Elvis Sings Flaming Star (1968)	Elvis (1968)	From Elvis in Memphis (1969)

Singles from Elvis
- 1. "If I Can Dream" Released: November 5, 1968; 2. "Memories" Released: February 25, 1969

Professional ratings
Review scores
Source	Rating
AllMusic	4.5/5 stars
MusicHound	4.5/5 stars
Rolling Stone	(mixed)
The Rolling Stone Album Guide	5/5 stars
Rough Guides	4/5 stars

Elvis is the soundtrack album for American rock and roll singer Elvis Presley's 1968 television special of the same title, released by RCA Records. It was recorded live at NBC Studios in Burbank, California, with additional studio work taking place at Western Recorders, in June 1968. The album peaked at No. 8 on the Billboard 200; along with the TV special, it revitalized Presley's career after years of diminishing commercial and critical success. It was certified Gold on July 22, 1969, and Platinum on July 15, 1999, by the RIAA.

== Content ==
The live album from the Elvis special is the audio-only version of the special, and consists of a mixture of studio and live recordings, the live material itself a mixture of "sit-down" tracks with a small group and "stand-up" tracks with an orchestra.

Unlike the drudgery of the feature film soundtrack recordings, Presley was genuinely excited by the project. For the album, the musical format presented Presley in three different settings: production numbers featuring medleys of his material; an informal small band featuring full songs in front of a live audience; and the two original numbers with Presley backed by an orchestra in front of a live audience. The two ballad tracks from this album were issued as singles. "If I Can Dream" being released earlier in the month, backed on the B-side with a song from his movie in theaters at the time, Live a Little, Love a Little, making it a double promotion on one record. It peaked at No. 12 on the Billboard Hot 100, his highest-charting single since 1965. "Memories" was released over two months after the broadcast, backed with the title song to his next film, Charro!. By making it to the top ten on the album chart after his previous album had charted at a dismal No. 82, this LP resuscitated his recording career at a time when it seemed practically moribund. Presley insisted the mono mixes for these songs were retained for the album.

== Reissues ==
Several hours of music were recorded for the special, and the unused material has been reissued in many different formats over the years.

- RCA first issued the original album on compact disc in Japan only in 1988. This disc contains the original LP track listing and no additional material.
- On August 27, 1991, RCA issued an expanded version with 8 bonus tracks on CD, NBC-TV Special, including unedited versions of the medleys in several cases.
- Two extensive compact disc releases appeared in 1998, Memories: The '68 Comeback Special featuring more comprehensive versions of the production and orchestral numbers, along with the complete first informal small band show of June 27, and Tiger Man featuring the complete evening show of the two informal small band concerts of June 27, 1968. (Both small band shows would be issued on vinyl as The King in the Ring for Record Store Day 2018.)
- In July 1999, a single-CD companion album, named Burbank '68: The NBC-TV 'Comeback Special' , was released as the debut release of Follow that Dream Records (FTD), Sony/RCA's Elvis Presley collectors' label dedicated to releasing archival material from RCA's vault of Elvis Presley studio, live, and rehearsal recordings. Burbank '68 included parts of the June 25th rehearsal, the second stand-up show on June 29, and some of the studio recordings made for the special.
- On August 5, 2008, RCA/Legacy released The Complete '68 Comeback Special, a 4-CD compilation of recording sessions and complete live performances recorded for the special, to celebrate the TV special's 40th anniversary.
- In May 2016, an expanded version of Elvis (NBC-TV Special) was released by FTD (Follow that Dream Records).
- On November 30, 2018, the 40th anniversary box (The Complete '68 Comeback Special) was expanded and re-issued as '68 Comeback Special – 50th Anniversary Edition, adding new stereo mixes of "Memories" and "If I Can Dream" as well as a bonus (fifth) disc of sessions and alternate takes (most of which had previously been released on the FTD edition of the album) and two Blu-ray discs of video. The 2018 box set removed a version of "A Little Less Conversation" which had included in the 2008 box set (and the 1998 album Memories: The 68 Comeback Special beforehand), as it had since been determined that, while this version and arrangement of the song had been considered for the special, it ultimately had been recorded as an alternate take (take 2) of the song for its original use (in Presley's film Live a Little, Love a Little).

== Track listing ==
=== Original release ===
Side one
No.	Title	Writer(s)	Recording date(s)	Length
1.	"Trouble" "Guitar Man"	Jerry Leiber and Mike Stoller; Jerry Reed	June 22, 1968	3:26
2.	"Lawdy Miss Clawdy" "Baby What You Want Me to Do" "Heartbreak Hotel" "Hound Dog" "All Shook Up" "Can't Help Falling in Love" "Jailhouse Rock" "Love Me Tender"	Lloyd Price; Jimmy Reed; Mae Boren Axton, Tommy Durden, Elvis Presley; Jerry Leiber and Mike Stoller; Otis Blackwell, Elvis Presley; George Weiss, Hugo Peretti, Luigi Creatore; Jerry Leiber and Mike Stoller; Vera Matson and Elvis Presley	June 27 and 29, 1968	14:52

Side two
No.	Title	Writer(s)	Recording date(s)	Length
1.	"Where Could I Go But to the Lord?" "Up Above My Head" "Saved"	J. B. Coats; Walter Earl Brown; Jerry Leiber and Mike Stoller	June 20–21, 1968	7:31
2.	"Blue Christmas" "One Night"	Billy Hayes and Jay W. Johnson; Dave Bartholomew and Pearl King	June 27, 1968	5:33
3.	"Memories"	Billy Strange and Mac Davis	June 23, 1968	3:16
4.	"Nothingville" "Big Boss Man" "Guitar Man" "Little Egypt" "Trouble" "Guitar Man"	Billy Strange and Mac Davis; Luther Dixon and Al Smith; Jerry Reed; Jerry Leiber and Mike Stoller; Jerry Leiber and Mike Stoller; Jerry Reed	June 20–21, 1968	6:42
5.	"If I Can Dream"	Walter Earl Brown	June 23, 1968	3:19

=== 1991 CD reissue ===
Bonus sections are listed in italics
No.	Title	Writer(s)	Recording date(s)	Length
1.	"Trouble" "Guitar Man"	Jerry Leiber and Mike Stoller; Jerry Reed	June 22, 1968	3:26
2.	"Lawdy Miss Clawdy" "Baby What You Want Me to Do"	Lloyd Price; Jimmy Reed	June 27, 1968	3:34
3.	"Heartbreak Hotel" "Hound Dog" "All Shook Up" "Can't Help Falling in Love" "Jailhouse Rock" "Don't Be Cruel" "Blue Suede Shoes" "Love Me Tender"	Mae Boren Axton, Tommy Durden, Elvis Presley; Jerry Leiber and Mike Stoller; Otis Blackwell and Elvis Presley/ George David Weiss, Hugo Peretti, Luigi Creatore; Jerry Leiber and Mike Stoller; Otis Blackwell and Elvis Presley; Carl Perkins; Vera Matson and Elvis Presley	June 29, 1968	14:14
4.	"Where Could I Go But to the Lord?" "Up Above My Head" "Saved"	J. B. Coats; Walter Earl Brown; Jerry Leiber and Mike Stoller	June 21–22, 1968	7:31
5.	"Baby What You Want Me to Do" "That's All Right (Mama)" "Blue Christmas" "One Night" "Tiger Man" "Trying to Get to You"	Jimmy Reed; Arthur Crudup; Billy Hayes and Jay W. Johnson; Dave Bartholomew and Pearl King; Lewis Burns, Al Lewis, Joe Hill Louis; Rose Marie McCoy and Charles Singleton	June 27, 1968	15:49
6.	"Memories"	Billy Strange and Mac Davis	June 23, 1968	3:16
7.	"Nothingville" "Big Boss Man" "Let Yourself Go" "It Hurts Me" "Guitar Man" "Little Egypt" "Trouble"	Billy Strange and Mac Davis; Luther Dixon and Al Smith; Joy Byers; Joy Byers and Charlie Daniels; Jerry Reed; Jerry Leiber and Mike Stoller	June 20–21, 1968	11:46
8.	"If I Can Dream"	Walter Earl Brown	June 23, 1968	3:19

=== Memories ===
Disc one
No.	Title	Writer(s)	Recording date	Length
1.	"Trouble" "Guitar Man"	Jerry Leiber and Mike Stoller; Jerry Reed	June 22, 1968	3:22
2.	"Heartbreak Hotel"	Mae Boren Axton, Tommy Durden, Elvis Presley	June 29, 1968	1:34
3.	"Hound Dog"	Jerry Leiber and Mike Stoller	June 29, 1968	0:47
4.	"All Shook Up"	Otis Blackwell and Elvis Presley	June 29, 1968	2:01
5.	"Can't Help Falling in Love"	George David Weiss, Hugo Peretti, Luigi Creatore	June 29, 1968	2:19
6.	"Jailhouse Rock"	Jerry Leiber and Mike Stoller	June 29, 1968	1:59
7.	"Don't Be Cruel"	Otis Blackwell and Elvis Presley	June 29, 1968	1:42
8.	"Blue Suede Shoes"	Carl Perkins	June 29, 1968	2:24
9.	"Love Me Tender"	Vera Matson and Elvis Presley	June 29, 1968	3:29
10.	"Baby What You Want Me to Do"	Jimmy Reed	June 29, 1968	3:16
11.	"Trouble" "Guitar Man"	Jerry Leiber and Mike Stoller; Jerry Reed	June 22, 1968	4:22
12.	"Sometimes I Feel Like a Motherless Child" (Vocals: Darlene Love); Where Could I Go But to the Lord?" "Up Above My Head" "Saved"	Traditional (arranged by Walter Earl Brown); J. B. Coats; Walter Earl Brown; Jerry Leiber and Mike Stoller	June 21–28, 1968	9:00
13.	"Memories"	Billy Strange and Mac Davis	June 23, 1968	3:15
14.	"A Little Less Conversation"	Billy Strange and Mac Davis	June 23, 1968	1:43
15.	"Nothingville" "Big Boss Man" "Let Yourself Go" "It Hurts Me" "Guitar Man" "Little Egypt" "Trouble"	Billy Strange and Mac Davis; Luther Dixon and Al Smith; Joy Byers; Joy Byers and Charles E. Daniels; Jerry Reed; Jerry Leiber and Mike Stoller; Jerry Leiber and Mike Stoller	June 20–21, 1968	15:42
16.	"If I Can Dream"	Walter Earl Brown	June 23, 1968	3:11

Disc two
No.	Title	Writer(s)	Recording date	Length
1.	"When It Rains, It Really Pours"	Billy Emerson	June 24, 1968	1:51
2.	"Lawdy, Miss Clawdy"	Lloyd Price	June 25, 1968	1:45
3.	"Baby What You Want Me To Do"	Jimmy Reed	June 26, 1968	1:27
4.	"That's All Right"	Arthur Crudup	June 27, 1968	6:42
5.	"Heartbreak Hotel"	Mae Boren Axton, Tommy Durden, Elvis Presley	June 27, 1968	2:53
6.	"Love Me"	Jerry Leiber and Mike Stoller	June 27, 1968	2:55
7.	"Baby What You Want Me To Do"	Jimmy Reed	June 27, 1968	3:45
8.	"Blue Suede Shoes"	Carl Perkins	June 27, 1968	4:40
9.	"Baby What You Want Me To Do"	Jimmy Reed	June 27, 1968	2:53
10.	"Lawdy, Miss Clawdy"	Lloyd Price	June 27, 1968	4:03
11.	"Are You Lonesome Tonight?"	Roy Turk and Lou Handman	June 27, 1968	2:56
12.	"When My Blue Moon Turns To Gold Again"	Wiley Walker and Gene Sullivan	June 27, 1968	0:38
13.	"Blue Christmas"	Billy Hayes and Jay W. Johnson	June 27, 1968	2:27
14.	"Trying To Get To You"	Rose Marie McCoy and Charles Singleton	June 27, 1968	2:58
15.	"One Night"	Dave Bartholomew and Pearl King	June 27, 1968	3:54
16.	"Baby What You Want Me To Do"	Jimmy Reed	June 27, 1968	3:59
17.	"One Night"	Dave Bartholomew and Pearl King	June 27, 1968	3:51
18.	"Memories"	Billy Strange and Mac Davis	June 27, 1968	3:25
19.	"If I Can Dream"	Walter Earl Brown	June 30, 1968	3:10

=== The Complete '68 Comeback Special ===
Disc one
No.	Title	Length
1.	"Trouble" / "Guitar Man"	3:29
2.	"Lawdy, Miss Clawdy" / "Baby What You Want Me to Do" / "Heartbreak Hotel" / "Hound Dog" / "All Shook Up" / "Can't Help Falling in Love" / "Jailhouse Rock" / "Love Me Tender"	14:42
3.	"Where Could I Go But to the Lord" / "Up Above My Head" / "Saved"	7:35
4.	"Blue Christmas" / "One Night"	5:34
5.	"Memories"	3:20
6.	"Medley: Nothingville" / "Big Boss Man" / "Guitar Man" / "Little Egypt" / "Trouble" / "Guitar Man"	6:43
7.	"If I Can Dream"	3:22
8.	"It Hurts Me"	2:32
9.	"Let Yourself Go"	2:37
10.	"A Little Less Conversation"	1:46
11.	"Memories"	3:08
12.	"If I Can Dream"	3:09

Disc two
No.	Title	Length
1.	"That's All Right"	4:08
2.	"Heartbreak Hotel"	2:54
3.	"Love Me"	3:12
4.	"Baby, What You Want Me to Do"	5:44
5.	"Blue Suede Shoes"	2:20
6.	"Baby, What You Want Me to Do"	4:02
7.	"Lawdy, Miss Clawdy"	3:02
8.	"Are You Lonesome Tonight?"	2:51
9.	"When My Blue Moon Turns to Gold Again"	0:38
10.	"Blue Christmas"	2:36
11.	"Trying to Get to You"	2:49
12.	"One Night"	3:56
13.	"Baby, What You Want Me to Do"	5:10
14.	"One Night"	2:37
15.	"Memories"	3:26
16.	"Heartbreak Hotel"	1:28
17.	"Hound Dog"	0:46
18.	"All Shook Up"	1:57
19.	"Can't Help Falling in Love"	2:18
20.	"Jailhouse Rock"	1:59
21.	"Don't Be Cruel"	1:42
22.	"Blue Suede Shoes"	2:33
23.	"Love Me Tender"	4:17
24.	"Trouble"	3:01
25.	"Baby, What You Want Me to Do"	3:05
26.	"If I Can Dream"	3:16

Disc three
No.	Title	Length
1.	"Heartbreak Hotel"	4:12
2.	"Baby, What You Want Me to Do"	3:27
3.	"Introductions"	2:16
4.	"That's All Right"	3:07
5.	"Are You Lonesome Tonight?"	3:59
6.	"Baby, What You Want Me to Do"	3:24
7.	"Blue Suede Shoes"	2:26
8.	"One Night"	3:19
9.	"Love Me"	4:14
10.	"Trying to Get to You"	3:04
11.	"Lawdy, Miss Clawdy"	2:57
12.	"Santa Claus Is Back in Town"	1:17
13.	"Blue Christmas"	4:02
14.	"Tiger Man"	3:11
15.	"When My Blue Moon Turns to Gold Again"	1:17
16.	"Memories"	3:15
17.	"Heartbreak Hotel"	1:23
18.	"Hound Dog"	0:46
19.	"All Shook Up"	1:36
20.	"Can't Help Falling in Love"	2:25
21.	"Jailhouse Rock"	2:00
22.	"Don't Be Cruel"	1:37
23.	"Blue Suede Shoes"	2:46
24.	"Love Me Tender"	3:31
25.	"Trouble" / "Guitar Man"	5:10
26.	"Trouble" / "Guitar Man"	2:32
27.	"If I Can Dream"	3:20

Disc four
No.	Title	Length
1.	"I Got a Woman"	2:47
2.	"Blue Moon" / "Young Love" / "Oh, Happy Day"	2:21
3.	"When It Rains It Really Pours"	2:55
4.	"Blue Christmas"	3:28
5.	"Are You Lonesome Tonight?" / "That's My Desire"	3:12
6.	"That's When Your Heartaches Begin"	0:49
7.	"Peter Gunn Theme"	1:37
8.	"Love Me"	1:45
9.	"When My Blue Moon Turns to Gold Again"	1:52
10.	"Blue Christmas" / "Santa Claus Is Back in Town"	3:03
11.	"Danny Boy"	1:35
12.	"Baby, What You Want Me to Do"	3:22
13.	"Love Me"	2:38
14.	"Tiger Man"	3:14
15.	"Santa Claus Is Back in Town"	2:44
16.	"Lawdy, Miss Clawdy"	2:18
17.	"One Night"	2:18
18.	"Blue Christmas"	2:49
19.	"Baby, What You Want Me to Do"	1:25
20.	"When My Blue Moon Turns to Gold Again"	1:14
21.	"Blue Moon of Kentucky"	1:43

== Personnel ==
on June 20–23, 29, 1968

- Elvis Presley – vocals, electric rhythm guitar
- The Blossoms (Darlene Love, Fanita James, Jean King) – backing vocals
- Tommy Morgan – harmonica
- Mike Deasy – electric guitar
- Al Casey – electric guitar
- Tommy Tedesco – electric guitar
- Larry Knechtel – keyboards, bass guitar
- Don Randi – piano
- Charles Berghofer – double bass
- Hal Blaine – drums
- John Cyr, Elliot Franks – percussion
- Frank DeVito – bongo
- Billy Goldenberg – orchestra conductor

on June 24-25, 27, 1968

- Elvis Presley – lead vocals, acoustic and electric rhythm guitars, electric lead guitar
- Scotty Moore – acoustic rhythm guitar, electric and acoustic lead guitars
- Charlie Hodge – harmony and backing vocals, acoustic rhythm guitar
- D.J. Fontana – percussion
- Alan Fortas – percussion
- Lance LeGault – tambourine

== Charts ==
=== Album ===
Year	Chart	Position
1968	Billboard Pop Albums	8

=== Certifications and sales ===
Region	Certification	Certified units/sales
United States (RIAA)	Platinum	1,000,000^{^}
^{^} Shipments figures based on certification alone.
