= Almost in Love =

Compilation album by Elvis Presley
- Released: November 1970
- Recorded: June 29, 1966 – January 20, 1969
- Genre: Rock and roll
- Length: 25:44
- Label: RCA Camden

Elvis Presley chronology
Worldwide 50 Gold Award Hits Vol. 1 (1970)	Almost in Love (1970)	That's the Way It Is (1970)

Professional ratings
Review scores
Source	Rating
AllMusic	3.5/5 stars
MusicHound	3/5 stars

Almost in Love is a compilation album by American singer Elvis Presley, released in November 1970 by RCA Records on their budget label, RCA Camden. It was the first of several albums on the low-priced RCA Camden label (others including C'mon Everybody and I Got Lucky) to make available in LP format tracks that had previously been available only on 45 rpm singles or EPs.

It was certified Gold and Platinum on January 6, 2004 by the Recording Industry Association of America.

== Content ==
Tracks of note on Almost in Love include 1968's "A Little Less Conversation" from the soundtrack of Live a Little, Love a Little (an alternate take of this song by Elvis for his 1968 TV Special would later be remixed by Tom Holkenborg a.k.a. Junkie XL and become a worldwide hit in 2002) and "Rubberneckin'", a 1969 single from the film Change of Habit that had also been recorded in Memphis during the 1969 recording sessions. The song would later be remixed by Paul Oakenfold in 2003.

The track "Stay Away, Joe" (the theme from Elvis's 1967 film of the same title) was included in error as it was already released earlier in 1970 on the compilation Let's Be Friends); when RCA reissued Almost in Love in 1973, it was replaced with a different song, "Stay Away", from the same film, which had never previously been available on an album. The only track in the collection previously available in LP format was "Long Legged Girl (with the Short Dress On)", which had been previously included on the soundtrack album to Double Trouble.

The title track of the album is a song from Presley's 1968 film, Live a Little, Love a Little.

== Reissues ==
In 1975, The album was reissued by Pickwick Records by arrangement with RCA featuring different cover art. RCA reissued the album on compact disc in 2006.

== Track listing ==
Side one
No.	Title	Writer(s)	Recording date	Length
1.	"Almost in Love" (from Live a Little, Love a Little)	Luiz Bonfá, Randy Starr	March 7, 1968	2:54
2.	"Long Legged Girl (with the Short Dress On)" (from Double Trouble)	John Leslie McFarland, Winfield Scott	June 29, 1966	1:27
3.	"Edge of Reality" (from Live a Little, Love a Little)	Bill Giant, Bernie Baum, Florence Kaye	March 7, 1968	3:14
4.	"My Little Friend"	Shirl Milete	January 16, 1969	2:50
5.	"A Little Less Conversation" (from Live a Little, Love a Little)	Billy Strange, Mac Davis	March 7, 1968	2:00

Side two
No.	Title	Writer(s)	Recording date	Length
1.	"Rubberneckin'" (from Change Of Habit)	Dory Jones, Bunny Warren	January 20, 1969	2:12
2.	"Clean Up Your Own Backyard" (from The Trouble With Girls)	Billy Strange, Mac Davis	October 23, 1968	3:10
3.	"U.S. Male"	Jerry Reed	January 16, 1968	2:42
4.	"Charro" (from Charro!)	Billy Strange, Mac Davis	October 15, 1968	2:45
5.	"Stay Away, Joe" (from Stay Away, Joe)	Ben Weisman, Sid Wayne	October 1, 1967	1:37

The final track was replaced by the following on the 1973 LP re-release and the 2006 compact disc release:

No.	Title	Writer(s)	Recording date	Length
5.	"Stay Away"	Sid Tepper, Roy C. Bennett	January 16, 1968	2:23
