= Charro (song) =

Single by Elvis Presley

from the album Almost in Love
- A-side: "Memories"
- Released: February 25, 1969
- Recorded: October 15, 1968
- Studio: Samuel Goldwyn Studio, Hollywood
- Genre: Western, Baroque pop
- Length: 2:42
- Label: RCA Records
- Songwriters: Billy Strange; Mac Davis

Elvis Presley singles chronology
"If I Can Dream" / "Edge of Reality" (1968)	"Charro" / "Memories'" (1969)	"His Hand in Mine" (1969)

"Charro" is a song first recorded by Elvis Presley as part of the soundtrack for his 1969 motion picture Charro!, a western directed by Charles Marquis Warren. It is the film's title song and the only song featured, as Charro! was Presley's first film in which he didn't sing in character.

== Writing and recording ==
The song was written by Billy Strange and Mac Davis specially for the movie Charro!.

The recordings took place at the Samuel Goldwyn Studio in Hollywood in October–November 1968. Presley probably overdubbed his vocals on October 15. Takes 5 and 9 were spliced together to form the vocal master.

== Release ==
The song was first released on a single (in March 1969) with "Memories", a song from Elvis' 1968 NBC TV comeback special, on the opposite side. "Charro!" didn't chart on the Billboard Hot 100, while "Memories" charted, peaking at number 35.

"Charro"'s first LP release was on the album Almost in Love in late 1970.

On December 1, 1970, the single was re-released as part of RCA Victor's Gold Standard Series (together with 9 other Presley's singles).

== Musical style and lyrics ==
It is a western-style song.

== Track listing ==
7" single RCA 47-9731 (March 1969)

1. "Memories"
2. "Charro"
