= Tiger Man (album) =

Compilation album by Elvis Presley
- Released: September 15, 1998
- Recorded: June 27, 1968
- Genre: Rock and roll
- Label: RCA Records

Elvis Presley chronology
| An Afternoon in the Garden (1997) | Tiger Man (1998) | Memories: The '68 Comeback Special (1998) |

Professional ratings
Review scores
| Source | Rating |
|---|---|
| AllMusic | 3/5 stars |

Tiger Man is a compilation issued in 1998 by RCA Records from American singer and musician Elvis Presley consisting of tracks from his second comeback concert in 1968.

== Track listing ==
| No. | Title | Writer(s) | Length |
|---|---|---|---|
| 1. | "Heartbreak Hotel" | Mae Boren Axton, Tommy Durden, Elvis Presley | 4:42 |
| 2. | "Baby, What You Want Me to Do" | Jimmy Reed | 2:29 |
| 3. | "Introductions 8pm" | ̶̶ | 2:50 |
| 4. | "That's All Right" | Arthur "Big Boy" Crudup | 3:41 |
| 5. | "Are You Lonesome Tonight?" | Lou Handman, Roy Turk | 3:50 |
| 6. | "Baby, What You Want Me to Do" | Jimmy Reed | 3:30 |
| 7. | "Blue Suede Shoes" | Carl Perkins | 2:22 |
| 8. | "One Night" | Dave Bartholomew, Pearl King, Anita Steiman | 3:18 |
| 9. | "Love Me" | Jerry Leiber and Mike Stoller | 4:14 |
| 10. | "Tryin' to Get to You" | Rose Marie McCoy, Charles Singleton | 3:03 |
| 11. | "Lawdy Miss Clawdy" | Lloyd Price | 2:54 |
| 12. | "Santa Claus Is Back in Town" | Jerry Leiber and Mike Stoller | 1:20 |
| 13. | "Blue Christmas" | Bill Hayes, Jay Johnson | 4:02 |
| 14. | "Tiger Man" | Joe Hill Louis, Sam Phillips (as Sam Burns) | 3:11 |
| 15. | "When My Blue Moon Turns to Gold Again" | Gene Sullivan, Wiley Walker | 1:17 |
| 16. | "Memories" | Mac Davis, Billy Strange | 3:20 |
