= Burbank '68 =

Live album by Elvis Presley
- Released: 1999
- Recorded: June 1968
- Genre: Rock
- Label: Follow That Dream

Elvis Presley chronology
On Stage (1999)	Burbank '68 (1999)	Elvis (1999)

Burbank '68 is an Elvis Presley album released by Follow That Dream Records in 1999.

== Content ==
This compact disc contains rehearsal material for the NBC television special Elvis performed in June 1968. There are 23 tracks (including two tracks of dialogue) on the CD, of which no less than 14 are previously unreleased. This album focuses on the June 25 so called 'dress rehearsal' and the June 29, 6 PM 'stand up' show, along with a few studio tracks.

== Track listing ==
1. "Danny Boy (Instrumental)" – 2:00
2. "Baby What You Want Me to Do" – 3:22
3. "Love Me" – 2:38
4. "Tiger Man" – 3:14
5. "Dialogue with Steve Binder" – 2:55
6. "Lawdy Miss Clawdy" – 2:18
7. "One Night" – 2:19
8. "Blue Christmas" – 2:29
9. "Baby What You Want Me to Do" – 1:25
10. "When My Blue Moon Turns to Gold Again" – 1:14
11. "Blue Moon Of Kentucky" – 1:43
12. "Elvis Dialogue 2" –
13. "Heartbreak Hotel" - 1:15
14. "Hound Dog" - 0:55
15. "All Shook Up" - 1:36
16. "Can't Help Falling In Love" - 2:25
17. "Jailhouse Rock" - 2:14
18. "Don't Be Cruel" - 1:36
19. "Love Me Tender" - 3:23
20. "Blue Suede Shoes" - 2:32
21. "Trouble/Guitar Man" - 2:38
22. "If I Can Dream" - 3:21
23. "Let Yourself Go (Instrumental)" -
