= Memories: The '68 Comeback Special =

Compilation album by Elvis Presley
- Released: October 13, 1998
- Recorded: June 20–29, 1968
- Genre: Rock and roll, easy listening, rockabilly
- Label: RCA Records

Elvis Presley chronology
Tiger Man (1998)	Memories: The '68 Comeback Special (1998)	Sunrise (1999)

Professional ratings
Review scores
Source	Rating
Allmusic	4/5 stars

Memories: The '68 Comeback Special was a 1998 double album released by RCA Records that was a repackaging of material from the 1968 Elvis Presley television special, Elvis (commonly referred to as the Elvis Presley '68 Comeback Special).

Twenty-two of the compilation's 35 tracks were previously unreleased recordings, including several alternate takes. The album is named after the song "Memories" which appears twice on the album. The album includes exclusive songs that were never issued again, including full length, unedited versions of the gospel and road medleys, along with the opening "Trouble/Guitar Man" song without any overdubbed audience.

== Track listing ==
Disc one
No.	Title	Length
1.	"Trouble/Guitar Man"	3:22
2.	"Heartbreak Hotel"	1:34
3.	"Hound Dog"	0:47
4.	"All Shook Up"	2:01
5.	"Can't Help Falling in Love"	2:19
6.	"Jailhouse Rock" (previous unreleased)	1:59
7.	"Don't Be Cruel" (previous unreleased)	1:42
8.	"Blue Suede Shoes" (previous unreleased)	2:24
9.	"Love Me Tender" (previous unreleased)	3:29
10.	"Baby What You Want Me to Do" (previous unreleased)	3:16
11.	"Trouble/Guitar Man" (previous unreleased)	4:22
12.	"Sometimes I Feel Like a Motherless Child" / "Where Could I Go But the Lord" / "Up Above My Head" / "Saved" (Gospel medley)	9:00
13.	"Memories"	3:15
14.	"A Little Less Conversation" (previous unreleased)	1:43
15.	"Nothingville" / "Big Boss Man" / "Let Yourself Go" / "It Hurts Me" (road medley)	15:42
16.	"If I Can Dream" (previous unreleased)	3:11

Disc two
No.	Title	Length
1.	"When It Rains, It Really Pours" (previous unreleased)	1:51
2.	"Lawdy, Miss Clawdy" (previous unreleased)	1:45
3.	"Baby What You Want Me To Do" (previous unreleased)	1:27
4.	"That's All Right" (previous unreleased)	6:42
5.	"Heartbreak Hotel" (previous unreleased)	2:53
6.	"Love Me" (previous unreleased)	2:55
7.	"Baby What You Want Me To Do" (previous unreleased)	3:45
8.	"Blue Suede Shoes"	4:40
9.	"Baby What You Want Me To Do"	2:53
10.	"Lawdy, Miss Clawdy" (previous unreleased)	4:03
11.	"Are You Lonesome Tonight?" (previous unreleased)	2:56
12.	"When My Blue Moon Turns To Gold Again" (previous unreleased)	0:38
13.	"Blue Christmas" (previous unreleased)	2:27
14.	"Trying To Get To You" (previous unreleased)	2:58
15.	"One Night" (previous unreleased)	3:54
16.	"Baby What You Want Me To Do" (previous unreleased)	3:59
17.	"One Night"	3:51
18.	"Memories" (previous unreleased)	3:25
19.	"If I Can Dream" (previous unreleased)	3:10
