= Edge of Reality (disambiguation) =

Edge of Reality is an American video game company.

Edge of Reality may also refer to:

- "Edge of Reality" (Elvis Presley song), a single released in 1968
- Edge of Reality, a 2012 EP by the Dead Rabbitts
- Doctor Who: The Edge of Reality, a 2020 video game published by Maze Theory
