= Platinum: A Life in Music =

Box set by Elvis Presley
- Released: July 15, 1997
- Genres: Rock; pop
- Length: 4:23:38
- Label: RCA

Elvis Presley chronology
An Afternoon in the Garden (1997)	Platinum: A Life in Music (1997)	Greatest Jukebox Hits (1997)

Platinum: A Life in Music is a box set by Elvis Presley that chronicles Presley's career from a "unique" perspective. The box set was reissued in 2017.

== Release ==
A few months the release of Platinum: A Life in Music, a sequel titled A Touch of Platinum was released. 5 months after the release of A Touch of Platinum, a second volume was released.

== Reception ==
Professional ratings
Review scores
Source	Rating
AllMusic (Platinum: A Life in Music)	3/5 stars
AllMusic (A Touch of Platinum: Volume 1)	4/5 stars
AllMusic (A Touch of Platinum: Volume 2)	3/5 stars
The Encyclopedia of Popular Music	4/5 stars
Entertainment Weekly	B
MusicHound	1.5/5
Rolling Stone	4/5 stars
The Rolling Stone Album Guide (Platinum: A Life in Music)	3.5/5 stars
The Rolling Stone Album Guide (A Touch of Platinum: Volume 2)	2.5/5 stars

Rolling Stone critic David McGee stated that it "does an exemplary job of charting the evolution of Elvis’ approach to his material" and that "The headline news of Platinum, however — which can be appreciated by fans, scholars, critics and religious fanatics alike — is the inclusion of a newly discovered 1954 demo of the unsigned Elvis singing a lilting wisp of a pop song called 'I'll Never Stand in Your Way.'" AllMusic critic Stephen Thomas Erlewine called it an "alternative history of Elvis' career" and that "Platinum: A Life in Music is targeted at hardcore collectors," and calling it "worthwhile for any serious Elvis collector."

== Track listing ==
Disc one
No.	Title	Tracks in medley	Length
1.	"I'll Never Stand In Your Way"		2:00
2.	"That's All Right" (unspecified take)		2:03
3.	"Blue Moon" (unspecified take)		3:13
4.	"Good Rockin' Tonight"		2:12
5.	"Mystery Train"		2:25
6.	"I Got A Woman" (unspecified take)		2:34
7.	"Heartbreak Hotel" (take 6)		2:15
8.	"I'm Counting On You" (take 13)		2:29
9.	"Shake, Rattle and Roll/Flip, Flop and Fly"		2:09
10.	"Lawdy Miss Clawdy" (take 1)		2:21
11.	"I Want You, I Need You, I Love You" (take 4)		2:47
12.	"Hound Dog"		2:35
13.	"Don't Be Cruel"		2:02
14.	"Rip It Up" (take 14)		2:10
15.	"Love Me Tender"		3:17
16.	"When The Saints Go Marching In"		1:22
17.	"All Shook Up"		1:57
18.	"(There'll Be) Peace In The Valley (For Me)" (take 3)		3:22
19.	"Blueberry Hill"		3:20
20.	"(Let Me Be Your) Teddy Bear"		1:46
21.	"Jailhouse Rock"		2:27
22.	"New Orleans"		1:59
23.	"I Need Your Love Tonight" (take 7)		2:01
24.	"A Big Hunk O' Love" (take 4)		2:12
25.	"Bad Nauheim Medley"	I'll Take You Home Again, Kathleen/I Will Be True/It's Been So Long Darling/Apron Strings/There's No Tomorrow	4:06

Disc two
No.	Title	Length
1.	"Stuck on You"	2:24
2.	"Fame and Fortune"	2:24
3.	"It's Now or Never"	3:13
4.	"It Feels So Right" (take 3)	2:09
5.	"A Mess of Blues" (take 1)	2:44
6.	"Are You Lonesome Tonight?"	3:06
7.	"Reconsider Baby"	3:39
8.	"Tonight's So Right for Love" (take 3)	2:15
9.	"His Hand in Mine" (take 2)	3:15
10.	"Milky White Way" (take 3)	2:30
11.	"I'm Comin' Home" (take 3)	2:24
12.	"I Feel So Bad" (take 1)	2:56
13.	"Can't Help Falling in Love"	2:56
14.	"Something Blue" (unspecified take)	3:04
15.	"Return to Sender"	2:05
16.	"Bossa Nova Baby" (take 2)	2:13
17.	"How Great Thou Art" (take 4)	2:54
18.	"Guitar Man" (take 4)	2:25
19.	"You'll Never Walk Alone" (take 2)	3:40
20.	"Oh, How I Love Jesus"	1:36
21.	"Tennessee Waltz"	1:19
22.	"Blowin' In The Wind"	2:04
23.	"I Can't Help It (If I'm Still in Love with You)"	1:52
24.	"I'm Beginning To Forget You"	0:53
25.	"After Loving You"	2:25

Disc three
No.	Title	Length
1.	"I Got a Woman"	1:40
2.	"Tiger Man"	2:45
3.	"When My Blue Moon Turns to Gold Again"	0:35
4.	"Trying to Get to You"	2:56
5.	"If I Can Dream" (take 1)	3:08
6.	"In the Ghetto" (take 3)	3:06
7.	"Suspicious Minds" (take 7)	3:17
8.	"Power Of My Love" (take 3)	2:15
9.	"Baby What You Want Me to Do"	2:18
10.	"10 Words"	2:33
11.	"Johnny B. Goode"	2:03
12.	"Release Me"	1:47
13.	"See See Rider"	3:04
14.	"The Wonder Of You"	2:37
15.	"The Sound of Your Cry" (take 3)	3:30
16.	"You Don't Have to Say You Love Me"	2:13
17.	"Funny How Time Slips Away"	4:18
18.	"I Washed My Hands In Muddy Water"	4:15
19.	"I Was The One"	1:02
20.	"Cattle Call"	0:25
21.	"Baby Let's Play House"	1:10
22.	"Don't"	1:55
23.	"Money Honey"	1:24
24.	"What’d I Say"	4:46
25.	"Bridge over Troubled Water"	4:12

Disc four
No.	Title	Length
1.	"Miracle Of The Rosary" (take 1)	3:51
2.	"He Touched Me" (take 2)	2:36
3.	"Bossom Of Abraham" (take 3)	1:37
4.	"I'll Be Home on Christmas Day" (take 4)	3:48
5.	"For the Good Times" (take 3)	3:13
6.	"Burning Love" (take 4)	3:04
7.	"Separate Ways" (take 25)	2:37
8.	"Always on my Mind" (take 2)	2:32
9.	"An American Trilogy"	4:16
10.	"Take Good Care of Her" (take 4)	2:53
11.	"I've Got a Thing About You Baby"	2:20
12.	"Are You Sincere" (take 2)	2:01
13.	"It's Midnight" (take 10)	3:21
14.	"Promised Land" (take 5)	3:21
15.	"Steamroller Blues"	2:50
16.	"And I Love You So" (take 2)	2:13
17.	"T-R-O-U-B-L-E"	3:02
18.	"Danny Doy"	3:53
19.	"Moody Blue" (take 9)	1:02
20.	"Hurt" (take 2)	2:09
21.	"For The Heart" (take 1)	1:10
22.	"Pledging My Love" (take 3)	4:52
23.	"Way Down" (take 2)	3:04
24.	"My Way"	4:46
25.	"(Excerpt From) The Jaycees Speech"

== Charts ==
=== Platinum: A Life in Music ===
Weekly chart performance for Platinum: A Life in Music
Chart (1997)	Peak position
Australian Albums (ARIA)	52
UK Albums (Official Charts)	86
UK Physical Albums (OCC)	86
US Billboard 200	80

=== A Touch of Platinum – A Life in Music: Volume 1 ===
Weekly chart performance for A Touch of Platinum – A Life in Music: Volume 1
Chart (1997)	Peak position
Belgian Albums (Ultratop Flanders)	21
Belgian Albums (Ultratop Wallonia)	28
Dutch Albums (Album Top 100)	23
German Albums (Offizielle Top 100)	98
Norwegian Albums (VG-lista)	23
Swedish Albums (Sverigetopplistan)	31

== Certifications and sales ==
Region	Certification	Certified units/sales
United States (RIAA)	Gold	500,000^{^}
^{^} Shipments figures based on certification alone.
