= Charro! =

1969 film by Charles Marquis Warren

- Theatrical release poster
- Directed by: Charles Marquis Warren
- Screenplay by: Charles Marquis Warren
- Story by: Frederick Louis Fox
- Produced by: Charles Marquis Warren
- Starring: Elvis Presley; Ina Balin; Victor French; Barbara Werle; Solomon Sturges; Lynn Kellogg
- Cinematography: Ellsworth Fredericks
- Edited by: Al Clark
- Music by: Hugo Montenegro
- Production company: National General Pictures
- Distributed by: National General Pictures
- Release date: March 12, 1969 (USA)
- Running time: 98 minutes
- Country: United States
- Language: English
- Box office: $1.5 million (US/ Canada rentals)

Charro! is a 1969 American Western film starring Elvis Presley, shot on location at Apacheland Movie Ranch and Old Tucson Studios in Arizona. This was Presley's only film in which he did not sing on-screen; the film featured no songs at all other than the main title theme, which was played over the opening credits. It was also the only movie in which Presley wore a beard. The film was novelized by Harry Whittington.

Ina Balin, Victor French, Barbara Werle, and Solomon Sturges co-starred. It was the final film for director Charles Marquis Warren, who also produced and wrote it. It was also the only Presley film distributed by National General Pictures. The film made a profit but was not a runaway success, and remains one of Presley's least-seen films despite being regarded among his best in terms of his acting (as opposed to his singing).

== Plot ==
Jess Wade, a former member of a gang of outlaws led by Vince Hackett, is led to believe that an old flame, Tracy Winters, wants to meet him in a seedy Mexican saloon. Jess sees Billy Roy Hackett, Vince's younger brother, summoning Vince and the other members of the gang into the saloon, and realizes he has been set up. Jess orders the bar patrons to leave before a shootout ensues. Making a break for the door, Jess is stopped by Gunner, another gang member, and is forced to relinquish his gun and to go with them to their hideout in the mountains. Vince later tells him that the gang has stolen a gold-plated cannon that was used by Emperor Maximilian in his ill-fated fight against popular Mexican leader Benito Juárez. Vince informs him that a wanted poster has been produced: it says that Jess is in the gang who stole the cannon and has sustained a neck wound as a result of being shot by one of the guards. Ordering his men to subdue Jess on the ground, Vince uses a branding iron to burn his neck. They take his horse, leaving him stranded. He captures a wild horse in the desert and saddle-breaks it. The gang's motive is to force a ransom from the town they stole the cannon from, but the gang also use the cannon to hold the townspeople at bay. Only Jess can save the people from his former gang.

== Cast ==
- Elvis Presley as Jess Wade
- Ina Balin as Tracey Winters
- Victor French as Vince Hackett
- Barbara Werle as Sara Ramsey
- Solomon Sturges as Billy Roy Hackett
- Lynn Kellogg as Marcie
- Paul Brinegar as Opie Keetch
- Harry Landers as Heff
- Tony Young as Lt. Rivera
- James Almanzar as Sheriff Ramsey
- James Sikking as Gunner

== Background ==
The role of Jess Wade was originally offered to Clint Eastwood, who turned it down. The budget for the movie was estimated at $2.5 million and Elvis was paid his now standard $850,000 plus 50% of the profits.

Committed to the role of a rough gunfighter in the film, Elvis grew a beard for the only time in a movie. His Memphis Mafia cohorts showed their support for Elvis by also growing beards at this time. Elvis also did his own horse riding in the film, which was helped by the experience he had with horses on his own ranch, the Circle G.

Elvis had long been a gun owner and collector of firearms, and he used to practice his quick draw with Clint Eastwood. Elvis made sure that he could show off his skills with firearms in this film.

Working titles for the film included Jack Valentine, Johnny Hung, and Come Hell or Come Sundown. Presley signed up to the project with high hopes after reading the serious, song-free script, but was left disappointed when he arrived for his first day of shooting on July 22, 1968, to find that the script he had originally signed up for had been changed beyond recognition, although Elvis ensured the main characters name of Jesus Wade was changed to Jess Wade.

The original opening scene, which was to feature female nudity, was dropped and focused instead on the film's opening gunfight. Frederick Louis Fox's original story for Charro! contains many violent scenes that were dropped from the film altogether, such as a closeup and longer edit of the branding scene. Harry Whittington based his novelization of Charro! on Fox's story, and included the scenes that Warren deemed too violent for the film. A scene featuring a nude Ina Balin climbing from a bath was also removed (despite the fact that she herself is dubbed), although this scene has been restored in the complete unedited version. Location scenes were shot at Apache Junction and the Apacheland Movie Ranch in Arizona.

Proud of his work in Charro!, Elvis said this was one of his favorite films, whilst there was much interest in Elvis starring in a western at that time. Warren Beatty wanted to co-star with Elvis in Butch Cassidy and the Sundance Kid and John Wayne wanted Elvis to co-star with him in True Grit. Elvis's manager Colonel Tom Parker contested Elvis's billing and would only agree if he was top billed. Eventually, he was paid more money to star in Charro than he would have been in those films.

Charro has been strongly reassessed as one of Elvis' best films and his performance as Jess Wade has been called the most convincing of his career. Many fans believe that a new phase of Elvis' acting career should have been ahead for him after this film and Change of Habit, but the concert stage beckoned.

Quentin Tarantino used the name of Charro's director, Charles Marquis Warren, for Samuel L. Jackson's character in his western The Hateful Eight.

== Reception ==
The film, although successful, was not received as well as Presley's previous films. Many of Presley's fans were put off by the lack of songs, and critics were generally unimpressed with the film as a whole. Despite this, the film made a good profit and Presley received $850,000 for his work and 50% of the profits.

Roger Greenspun of The New York Times wrote of Presley's performance, "He treats his part rather as a minor embarrassment, and he seems determined not to push himself in a role that could have used a stronger personality to fill the lapses in the story and the wide open spaces in the dialogue." Variety wrote that "Presley strolls through a tedious role that would have driven many another actor up the wall ... Even more at fault than Presley, who has occasionally responded in the past to the demands of a good director, is Charles Marquis Warren, who takes credit (or blame?) for the script, the direction, and even part of the production." Kevin Thomas of the Los Angeles Times wrote that in the film Presley "sings nary a note, which is too bad. A song or two, though arguably inappropriate, would have helped to relieve the tedium of this trite low-budget Western that has quick-sale-to-TV stamped all over it." Gary Arnold of The Washington Post called it "the least kinesthetic Western I've ever seen," which "seems to have conceived for the small screen. A plot that might suffice for 30 minutes of restless entertainment has been stretched to a somnambulent 98 minutes." Allan Eyles of The Monthly Film Bulletin wrote, "Unfortunately, Charro is fatally undermined by the slack staging of its action highlights and by a plot riddled with irrational behaviour and dialogue ... As if to compensate for the film's lack of impact, Hugo Montenegro's lively but over-attentive score does too much underlining of mood and character."

== Soundtrack ==
In June 1968, Presley had already completed the sequences and recorded the songs for what would be his comeback television special and its attendant album, Elvis, that put his musical talents back on display after the long slog of the soundtrack years. During the special, Presley erroneously states that he had made twenty-nine "pictures" up to that time. The actual tally was twenty-eight at taping. Charro would be the twenty-ninth. By the time the special aired in December 1968, Presley had completed his thirtieth film, The Trouble with Girls (and How to Get into It).

His confidence and enthusiasm restored, Presley turned to his musical obligations for Charro! Appropriately for a Western, the studio hired Hugo Montenegro to produce the two songs intended for the film. The recording session took place at Samuel Goldwyn Studio in Hollywood, California on October 15, 1968. The title song appeared in the movie during the opening credits, and was released commercially on February 25, 1969, as the b-side to RCA 47-9731 "Memories," which had also appeared on the TV special and album. The other song recorded for the film, but not used, "Let's Forget About the Stars", appeared on the budget album Let's Be Friends in 1970. This song is erroneously referred to in some sources as an outtake from the soundtrack of the later Presley film Change of Habit.

=== Personnel ===
- Elvis Presley - vocals
- Sue Allen, Sally Stevens, Allan Capps, Loren Faber
  Ronald Hicklin, Ian Freebairn Smith, Robert Zwirn - backing vocals
- Howard Roberts, Tommy Tedesco, Ralph Grasso - electric guitar
- Don Randi - piano
- Max Bennett - bass guitar
- Ray Brown - double bass
- Cubby O'Brien - drums
- Emil Radocchia - percussion
- unknown horns and strings

=== Film music track listing ===
1. "Charro" (Billy Strange and Mac Davis)
2. "Let's Forget About the Stars" (A. L. Owens) (Recorded for the film, but unused)

== Home media ==
Charro! was released on Video CD in 1996. Charro! was released to DVD in the summer of 2007. It marked the very first time that an uncut release of the film was presented to the retail market, and in its original wide-screen letterbox format. This DVD version underwent an extensive re-mastering process to restore the original 35mm film-print quality. Previous VHS issues of the film, notably the 1990 Warner Home Video release, were of an inferior standard, mainly due to poor picture quality and minor edits throughout the film. An oddity concerning Charro! is the film's classification. Despite containing violence and partial nudity (the latter a scene in which Ina Balin's character is shown exiting a bath tub), it was released with an MPAA G rating, even though other Presley films from the 1968-69 period carry PG ratings. These latter releases are somewhat less 'adult' than Charro!.

== See also ==
- List of American films of 1969
