= Barbara Werle =

American actress

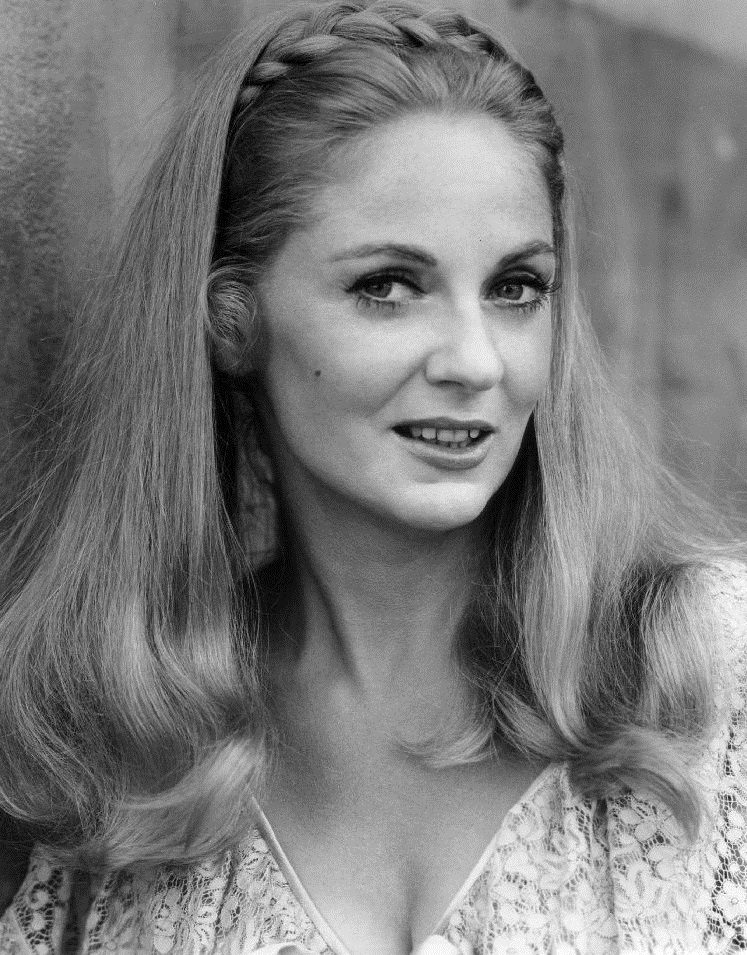
- Werle in 1978
- Born: Barbara May Theresa Werle; October 6, 1928; Mount Vernon, New York, U.S.
- Died: January 1, 2013 (aged 84); Carlsbad, California, U.S.
- Occupations: Actress, singer
- Years active: 1963–1976
- Spouse: John Branca Sr.
- Children: John Gregory Branca

Barbara May Theresa Werle (October 6, 1928 – January 1, 2013) was an American actress, dancer and singer, best known for her role in Seconds (1966).

== Career ==
Werle was born on October 6, 1928, in Mount Vernon, New York. She became a ballroom dancer after graduating from high school, winning the acclaimed Harvest Moon Ball in the early 1950s. As part of the dance team Barbara and Mansell, she toured the U.S.

On television, Werle had the role of June on San Francisco International Airport (1970–1971). Her other television credits included appearances on The Ed Sullivan Show and recurring roles on the NBC television series, The Virginian, during the 1960s and 1970s.

Werle's film credits included the Elvis Presley films Tickle Me, Harum Scarum (1965), and Charro! (1969); Battle of the Bulge (1965), The Rare Breed (1966), Gunfight in Abilene (1967), Krakatoa, East of Java (1969), and Gone with the West (1974).

== Retirement ==
She retired to La Costa, California. She sang as a soprano for the local St. Elizabeth Seton Traditional Choir from 2000 until 2012. Her children include entertainment lawyer John Gregory Branca.

== Death ==
Werle died at age 84 on January 1, 2013, from undisclosed causes, at Carlsbad, California.

== Filmography ==
Year	Title	Role	Notes
1965	Tickle Me	Barbara	
1965	Harum Scarum	Leilah	
1965	Battle of the Bulge	Elena	
1966	The Rare Breed	Gert	
1966	Seconds	Secretary	
1967	Gunfight in Abilene	Leann	
1967	Bikini Paradise	Bit part	Uncredited
1968	Krakatoa, East of Java	Charley	
1968	The Virginian (TV series)	Mrs Buell	saison 6 episode 23 (Stacey)
1968	The Virginian (TV series)	Clair French	saison 7 episode 08 (Ride to Misadventure)
1969	Charro!	Sara Ramsey	
1970	The Virginian (TV series)	Evelyn Neely	saison 8 episode 18 (Train of darkness)
1974	Gone with the West	Billie	
