= Almost in Love (song) =

Single by Elvis Presley

from the album Almost in Love
- B-side: "A Little Less Conversation"
- Released: September 3, 1968
- Recorded: March 7, 1968
- Studio: Western Recorders, Hollywood
- Length: 2:54
- Label: RCA Victor
- Songwriters: Luiz Bonfá; Randy Starr

Elvis Presley singles chronology
"Let Yourself Go" (1968)	"Almost in Love" (1968)	"If I Can Dream" / "Edge of Reality" (1968)

"Almost in Love" is a song recorded by Elvis Presley as part of the soundtrack for his 1968 motion picture Live a Little, Love a Little. Brazilian guitarist Luiz Bonfá had previously released an instrumental version of this tune in 1966 called "Moonlight in Rio".

In September 1968, it was released on a single, backed with the song "A Little Less Conversation". Its first LP release was as the title track of Presley's budget album Almost in Love in November 1970.

On December 1, 1970, the single "Almost in Love" / "A Little Less Conversation" was re-released as part of RCA Victor's Gold Standard Series (together with nine other Presley's singles).

== Writing ==
The song is credited to Luiz Bonfá and Randy Starr.

== Recording ==
Presley recorded it on March 7, 1968.

== Track listings ==
7" single (RCA Victor 49.569, November 29, 1968)

1. "Almost in Love" (3:00)
2. "A Little Less Conversation" (2:00)

== Charts ==
Chart (1968)	Peak position
Belgium (Ultratip Bubbling Under Wallonia)	–
U.S. Billboard Hot 100	95
"Almost in Love" / "A Little Less Conversation"
Australia (retrospect Kent Music Report)	64
