= Bob Finkel =

American director and producer

- Born: Robert S. Finkel; March 25, 1918; Philadelphia, Pennsylvania, U.S.
- Died: April 30, 2012 (aged 94); Beverly Hills, California, U.S.
- Education: Carnegie Mellon University
- Occupations: Director, producer
- Years active: 1950-1996
- Spouse: Jane Kramer (1922-1999)
- Children: 2

Robert S. Finkel (March 25, 1918 – April 30, 2012) was an American producer and director. Finkel has notable credits on the TV shows The Eddie Fisher Show, The Dinah Shore Chevy Show and The Andy Williams Show. Finkel also produced multiple broadcasts of the People's Choice Awards, the Oscars and the Emmy Awards. He also produced the televised comeback concert for singer Elvis Presley in 1968, the highest rated television show for the week of broadcast, and the highest rated television special of the year.

== Early life ==
Robert S. Finkel was born on March 25, 1918, in Philadelphia, Pennsylvania, the only son of William and Esther Finkel. Finkel had two sisters; Margery and Sally. His father owned several nickelodeon movie theaters in and around Philadelphia. He graduated from the Carnegie Mellon University with a Bachelor of Arts degree in drama. After college, Finkel secured several odd jobs including dancing in the Keith Circuit, being the resident director of the Wharf Theater in Provincetown, Massachusetts, and as director and lighting manager at the Pittsburgh Civic Light Opera Company.

Finkel enlisted and served in the Army Signal Corps during World War II. He was stationed in Burma. He was awarded a Citation Medal by the Chinese Government for his services during the war. He came back from the war in 1946.

== Career ==
Finkel began his professional career in show business as the director of an episode of ABC's Mysteries of Chinatown in 1950. From there Finkel continued his career becoming well known for producing, directing and even writing credits on such programs as The Colgate Comedy Hour, Gruen Guild Theater, City Detective, Sneak Preview, and The People’s Choice Awards. Finkel stepped into the producer’s role in 1959 on NBC's The Dinah Shore Chevy Show, a series he continued to produce and direct for the next several years. His career as a producer would crest over the next decade and a half, as he produced The Andy Williams Show during the mid-1960s.

During his latter career, Finkel worked as a writer and producer for several specials for celebrities such as Elvis Presley, Bing Crosby, Wayne Newton and John Denver. During this same time period of the 1970s and 1980s, Finkel directed episodes of Barney Miller, The Bob Newhart Show and Circus of the Stars.

Finkel's last credit was as the director of the 1996 made-for-television movie Have You Seen My Son.

== Personal life ==
Outside of his career as a director and producer, Finkel served as president of the Producers Guild of America from 1969 to 1971. In 1994, he became only the fourth PGA member honored with the Charles FitzSimons Lifetime Membership Award for his outstanding service to the Guild.

Finkel was also a member of the Writers Guild of America, West, Directors Guild of America, Academy of Television Arts & Sciences, American Federation of Musicians, Actors' Equity Association, and the Stage Directors and Choreographers Society.

Finkel also served on staff at the universities of UCLA and USC. He also taught seminars for the American Film Institute during the 1980s and 1990s.

Finkel was married once and had two daughters; Terry Lee Baldwin and Pamela Ann Lavaf. His wife Jane died on April 3, 1999, in Los Angeles at the age of 77. His daughter Pamela died on October 12, 2006, at the age of 53. Finkel's grandson, Drew Baldwin, is also a member of the Producers Guild.

== Death ==
Finkel died on April 30, 2012, in his Beverly Hills, California, home due to age-related illnesses. He was 94. He was preceded in death by his wife Jane Finkel and daughter Pamela Lavaf. Survivors included his daughter Terry Baldwin and other relatives.

== Awards and nominations ==
Finkel has received several honors and awards in his life which include being the recipient of two Primetime Emmy Awards for his work on The Andy Williams Show and the recipient of the Charles FitzSimons Lifetime Membership Award from the Producers Guild of America which he received in 1994. He was also nominated for a Primetime Emmy Award in 1965 for The Andy Williams Show.

Year	Award	Category	Work	Result	Ref
1965	Primetime Emmy Award	Outstanding Program Achievement in Entertainment	The Andy Williams Show	Nominated	
1966	Primetime Emmy Award	Outstanding Variety Series	The Andy Williams Show	Won	
1967	Primetime Emmy Award	Outstanding Variety Series	The Andy Williams Show	Won	
1994	Charles FitzSimons Lifetime Membership Award		Producers Guild of America	Won	
