= Live a Little, Love a Little =

1968 film by Norman Taurog, starring Elvis Presley

- Theatrical release poster
- Directed by: Norman Taurog
- Screenplay by: Michael A. Hoey; Dan Greenburg
- Based on: Kiss My Firm But Pliant Lips; 1965 novel by Dan Greenburg
- Produced by: Douglas Laurence
- Starring: Elvis Presley; Don Porter; Rudy Vallee; Michele Carey; Dick Sargent
- Cinematography: Fred J. Koenekamp
- Edited by: John McSweeney, Jr.
- Music by: Billy Strange
- Production company: Metro-Goldwyn-Mayer
- Distributed by: Metro-Goldwyn-Mayer
- Release date: October 23, 1968 (USA)
- Running time: 90 minutes
- Country: United States
- Language: English
- Budget: $3.6 million
- Box office: $8.1 million

Live a Little, Love a Little is a 1968 American musical comedy film starring Elvis Presley. It was directed by Norman Taurog, who had directed several previous Presley films. This was to be Taurog's final film, as he went blind shortly after production ended. Presley shares the screen with fellow legendary singing idol Rudy Vallée, whose career dated to the 1920s, but Vallee, in his late 60s, did not sing in the film.

The film introduced the song "A Little Less Conversation", an alternate take of which would form the basis of a remix that returned Presley to international music sales charts in 2002.

== Plot ==
Greg Nolan is a newspaper photographer who lives a carefree life until he encounters an eccentric, lovelorn woman named Bernice on the beach. Bernice assumes different names and personalities whenever the mood hits her. She introduces herself to Greg as "Alice" but she is known to the grocery delivery boy as "Susie" and to the milkman as "Betty."

After having her Great Dane dog Albert chase Greg into the water when he insults her after a kiss, Bernice invites him to stay at her beachfront home. Bernice later causes Greg to get fired from his job and get evicted from his apartment after drugging him, which leaves him in a deep sleep for days.

However, Bernice manages to find Greg another home. Greg wants to repay her, so he procures two full-time photographer jobs: one for a Playboy-like magazine owned by Mike Lansdown, and the other for a very conservative advertising firm co-owned by Mr. Penlow. The two jobs are in the same building, forcing Greg to run from one to the other without being detected. Greg also deals with Bernice and her eccentric ways, and finally realizes he has fallen in love with her.

== Cast ==
- Elvis Presley as Greg Nolan
- Michele Carey as Bernice
- Don Porter as Mike Lansdown
- Rudy Vallee as Mr. Penlow
- Dick Sargent as Harry
- Sterling Holloway as The Milkman
- Celeste Yarnall as Ellen
- Eddie Hodges as The Delivery Boy
- Joan Shawlee as Robbie's Mother
- Mary Grover as Miss Selfridge
- Emily Banks as RKC&P Receptionist
- Phyllis Davis as Secretary #2

== Background ==
Based on the 1965 novel Kiss My Firm, But Pliant, Lips by Dan Greenburg, and with a screenplay co-written by Greenburg, Live a Little, Love a Little was a departure from the standard Presley films of the period. It had a more mature tone than other Presley musicals, with strong language, drug references and an implied sexual encounter.

Presley was paid $850,000 plus 50% of the profits. Elvis also did all of his own stunts in the film, including the high speed driving and stunt work in a dune buggy during the film's opening scene. This has been compared to a similar scene featuring Steve McQueen in the film The Thomas Crown Affair, which was released at the same time as Live a Little, Love a Little.

Elvis also choreographed the film's fight scenes with the intention of displaying his karate skills. The fight in the newspaper pressing plant is also thought to have been an influence on the fight scene in a newspaper pressing plant in the James Bond film Tomorrow Never Dies. Perhaps because the producers knew how big of a fan Elvis was of James Bond.

Unlike many previous films that involved "location scenes" shot against a backdrop, Presley appeared in more real location scenes than usual. Scenes were filmed in and around Hollywood, along the Malibu coast, at Marineland and at the Los Angeles Music Center.

The film co-starred Michele Carey, Don Porter, Rudy Vallee and Dick Sargent, and featured Presley's father Vernon in an uncredited cameo. Several of Presley's Memphis Mafia friends, such as Red West and Joe Esposito, also appeared.

Released on October 23, 1968, the film failed to impress most critics. With a very poor performance on its American release, the film was not released in many regions, including in the U.K. Retrospectively, this film has become a cult favourite, with the standout song "A Little Less Conversation" becoming a smash hit and worldwide number one in 2001. Live a Little, Love a Little was also considered the first true postmodern screwball comedy. Also, Michelle Carey's character is similar to what became known as the Manic Pixie Dream Girl in contemporary cinema.

== Soundtrack ==
Live a Little, Love a Little, the second of Presley's five final movies during the 1960s, included just a handful of musical numbers. The recording session for the four songs written for the film took place at Western Recorders in Hollywood on March 7, 1968. The producer in nominal charge of the session, Billy Strange (also known for his work as a session guitarist and songwriter), was attuned to current trends in popular music and brought in a group of musicians outside of Presley's usual stable, offering written arrangements that strayed from Presley's usual sound. "Almost in Love" was co-written by Brazilian Bossa Nova great Luiz Bonfá, and has the undeniable groove of the Samba and Jazz blended style sweeping the World at that time. "Edge of Reality" was a piece of pseudo-acid rock and "A Little Less Conversation", written by Strange and his new discovery Mac Davis, bordered on funk.

"A Little Less Conversation" was released as a single with "Almost in Love" on the reverse side on September 3, 1968, RCA catalog nr. 47–9610. It peaked at No. 69, while its B-side scraped into the Billboard Hot 100 at No. 95 independently. Over three decades later, a remix of "A Little Less Conversation" became a global No. 1 hit record. The version sourced for the remix was initially believed to be a later re-recording made for the soundtrack of Presley's 1968 NBC comeback special, and not the movie version; however, when the Live a Little, Love a Little soundtrack tapes were rediscovered in the vaults. "Edge of Reality" appeared on November 5, 1968, as the B-side of RCA single 47-9670 "If I Can Dream," the song Presley used to close out his 1968 Christmas Special. "Wonderful World," which played over the opening credits to the film, appeared on the compilation Elvis Sings Flaming Star. All three tracks released on singles also appear on Command Performances: The Essential 60's Masters II.

=== Track listing ===
1. "Wonderful World" (Doug Flett, Guy Fletcher)
2. "Edge of Reality" (Bernie Baum, Bill Giant, Florence Kaye)
3. "A Little Less Conversation" (Billy Strange, Mac Davis)
4. "Almost in Love" (Luiz Bonfá, Randy Starr)

=== Personnel ===
Credits compiled from RCA and AFM union paperwork as organized and published by sessionographer Keith Flynn.

- Elvis Presley – vocals
- B. J. Baker, Sally Stevens, Bob Tebow, John Bahler – backing vocals
- Joseph 'Bobby' Gibbons – electric guitar
- Neil LeVang – electric guitar
- Al Casey – electric guitar
- Charles Britz – electric guitar
- Don Randi – piano
- Larry Knechtel – electric bass
- Charles Berghofer – double bass
- Hal Blaine – drums
- Gary Coleman – percussion
- Lew McCreary, Thomas Shepard, Richard Leith, Dick Hyde - trombones
- Roy Caton, Oliver Mitchell - trumpets
- James Horn - saxophone
- Lou Raderman, Sidney Sharp, Leonard Malarsky, Ralph Schaeffer, William Kurasch, Tibor Zelig, Jerome Reisler, James Getzoff, Harry Bluestone, Arnold Belnick, Bernard Kundell, Stanley Plummer - violins
- Harry Hyams, Joe DiFiore, Leonard Selic, Louis Kievman, David Burke, Gareth Nuttycombe - violas
- Jesse Ehrlich, Armand Kaproff, Joseph DiTullio, Victor Sazer, Frederick Seykora, H.G. Bemko - cellos
- Billy Strange - producer
- Chuck Britz - engineer

== Quotes ==
Celeste Yarnall, who played Ellen, recalled the making of the film and her impressions of Presley:

I adored Elvis. When I met him for the first time he immediately put me at ease. We had to film our kissing first and neither of us heard the director say, 'Cut!' For me, it was love at first kiss! We became very good friends. He was warm and kind and full of love. He had this tremendous desire to please people. We watched the funeral of Martin Luther King Jr. together over lunch in his trailer. He cried. He really cared deeply. He was far more handsome in person with deep blue eyes and a Roman profile. He held jam sessions on the set and would play cars with George Barris or play football with the 'boys' who traveled with him everywhere. He was truly 'The King.'

== Reception ==
Variety called the film one of Presley's "dimmest vehicles," writing that Taurog's direction "tried to give some lilt to the proceedings. Nothing, however, can buck that writing. Songs are dull, physical values are standard, and mediocrity prevails."

Kevin Thomas of the Los Angeles Times called the film "a pleasant Elvis Presley picture that's rather more sophisticated than the durable singing star's 27 prior efforts."

The Monthly Film Bulletin, reviewing the film in 1978, wrote that it "commendably attempts to create a more eccentric, 'sophisticated' setting for Presley than hitherto," but that it "fails to achieve the kind of comic invention vital to a screwball romantic comedy," and that its songs were "unmemorable."

== Home media ==
Live a Little, Love a Little was released by Warner Home Video on August 7, 2007, as a Region 1 widescreen DVD.

== See also ==
- List of American films of 1968
