= Charlie Hodge (guitarist) =

American singer, vocal coach and musician

- Born: Charles Franklin Hodge; December 14, 1934; Decatur, Alabama, U.S.
- Died: March 3, 2006 (aged 71); Knoxville, Tennessee, U.S.
- Occupations: singer, guitarist, pianist, actor
- Years active: 1954–2006
- Spouse: Jennifer Hodge

Charles Franklin Hodge (December 14, 1934 – March 3, 2006), better known as Charlie Hodge, was an American singer, vocal coach and musician who was a confidant and best friend of Elvis Presley, and lived at Graceland.

== Biography ==
=== Early music career ===
Born in Decatur, Alabama, Hodge began his musical career at age 17 in a gospel quartet, The Path Finders, with Bill Gaither. At 5'3", the tenor singer used an empty Coke crate to stand on as a comedy routine while singing with the quartet. Hodge then joined The Foggy River Boys, and first met Presley in 1955 when Presley came backstage after the group performed in Memphis, Tennessee while visiting to promote ABC-TV's Ozark Jubilee. Before Presley became a national success he commented to Hodge that he listened to him and his group on the radio. At that time The Foggy River Boys were the number one gospel quartet in the country. As a part of Ozark Jubilee, Hodge was also on network television before Presley.

=== The Elvis Presley years ===
During Hodge and Presley's Army service they met again in 1958 at Fort Hood, Texas. The two became friends, and Hodge subsequently became part of Presley's entourage, nicknamed the "Memphis Mafia".

Hodge is said to have been with Presley in Germany when the latter met his future wife, Priscilla. Hodge would later be the stage manager and a musician of The Elvis Presley Show, when Presley returned to live performances after Elvis, his 1968 comeback special. During Presley's movie making years Hodge would sometimes perform with singer/musician Jimmy Wakely in Reno. He also performed with the famous singing cowboy Roy Rogers and his horse, Trigger. He became known by the public for singing harmony for Presley, handing Presley water and scarves onstage, but had many other tasks, such as laying out the song list Presley was to perform, and sometimes holding the microphone when Presley was playing the piano or guitar with both hands. Presley also put him in charge of presenting songs directly to Presley that he might want to record or perform, and many were recorded. Music companies contracted to give Presley songs to record would refer to Hodge and bodyguard Red West, also a musician and songwriter, as "The Imperial Council" because Presley would look to them for their advice on songs presented for possible recording. Hodge recorded a duet with Presley in 1960 entitled "I Will Be Home Again". Hodge can also be heard playing the piano in the recording, "Suppose". Hodge received a songwriting credit for the song "You'll Be Gone" which he co-wrote with Presley and Red West in 1962. He changed the orchestration to that of a Spanish style.

Hodge helped out director George Sidney in the filming of Viva Las Vegas suggesting a special effect on a production number; three years later, in the studio with Presley as he pored through demos for the picture Spinout, he transformed an ignominious film soundtrack tune into a “walking blues“ (“I'll Be Back“), which impressed the director so much the plot denouement was rewritten to accommodate the number.

Hodge always figured heavily as Presley's musical advisor, initially teaching him the rarified near-falsetto style Presley would heavily rely upon in the early 1960s. He also played important roles in Presley's late 1960s show business comeback, first in a TV special, then in a documentary.

When Presley was needing to put a band together for his return to live performances he turned to Hodge for advice. Hodge recommended James Burton, lead guitarist, after seeing him play in a small club. After The Imperials left the Elvis Show, Hodge recommended using The Stamps Quartet.

Hodge lived for 17 years at Presley's Memphis, Tennessee estate, Graceland, and also had rooms in all of Presley's other homes away from Graceland which were personally decorated by Priscilla, in his favorite color schemes. Hodge was with Presley to the very end and was with the guarded escort to bring Presley and his mother Gladys's remains back to Graceland for reburial. Hodge stayed at Graceland for a year afterward, helping Presley's father Vernon with any affairs of the estate.

=== After Elvis Presley ===
Hodge's post-Elvis Presley life and career were subsequently dedicated to the deceased music legend. In 1979, Hodge made a cameo appearance in the TV film ELVIS starring Kurt Russell in which he played himself and served as a technical adviser for the project. From the early 1980s to 1993 Hodge discovered, lived, and toured globally with actor and impressionist Gary Wayne Bridges and co-produced the touring creation 'For the Love of Elvis" along with J.D. Sumner, and many of the original cast of Presley's group endorsing 20 year old Bridges as what they called at the time, the most authentic vocal double of Presley himself. Working with his then manager for both him and Bridges, Lewis Victor, Hodge co-produced and performed on two albums with Bridges featuring post non-Presley music of the day that Presley could have recorded as covers that sold over two million copies through national DRTV campaigns throughout North America.

Upon Bridges leaving the Elvis World and becoming a producer in Nashville and Las Vegas, he was able to facilitate a meeting in Pigeon Forge, Tennessee with Dee Gallon, and her brother Michael J. Ferraro, co-owners at that time of the Memories Theater that yielded a potential wonderful opportunity for Hodge to perform live for the fans for many years to come. During the last 15 years of his life, Hodge became a featured performer at the Memories Theater in "A Salute to Elvis" with a select group of some of the world's greatest Elvis Tribute Artists (ETA) and close friends William Stiles, Pete Wilcox, Eddie Miles, and Lou Vuto. While at Memories Theatre, Hodge performed some of the same duties he did while performing with Presley such as singing harmony, draping the scarves around the ETA's neck as he did with Presley, and played guitar, or if it was required for a certain song, he played the piano. Hodge traveled the world annually to speak at Elvis Presley events and to sometimes perform with longtime friend, singer and musician, Terry Mike Jeffery. Countries Hodge visited included England, Ireland, Belgium, Holland, Sweden, Norway, Finland, Germany, Italy, France, Spain, Switzerland, Hungary, Australia, and Japan. In 1988, Hodge wrote an autobiography-memoir, Me 'n Elvis, and in 1994, produced a DVD titled The Elvis I Knew.

In 1987 and 1988 Charlie Hodge was the opening act for Elvis World's Largest Tribute to the King. This was a major production with a 25 piece band plus backup singers. Charlie Hodge would come out and talk to the audience about his days with Elvis and warm up the crowd said Charlie Stickerod, the man who played Elvis in the show. Stickerod also said that besides being a great friend to me he was the kindest person that you would ever want to meet. Charlie Hodge also introduced Mr. Stickerod to Bill Belew (who was Elvis' costume designer) he then became Mr. Stickerod's costume designer and best friends until Mr. Belew's passing.

=== Last year and death ===
In October 2005, Hodge was diagnosed with lung cancer. He completed treatment and was told the cancer was gone, but succumbed to the disease on March 3, 2006. He was 71.

== Legacy ==
He was portrayed by Ryan Rilette in the 2005 CBS miniseries Elvis, which starred Jonathan Rhys-Meyers as Presley. The series was nominated for six Emmy Awards.

In 2004 he was inducted into the Alabama Hall of Fame.

On March 12, 2007, Hodge was honored at the 2007 Rock and Roll Hall of Fame induction ceremony in New York City. The ceremony opened with "in memoriam" photos of personalities important in rock and roll who had died in 2006, which included Hodge.

In the band Dread Zeppelin, which plays Led Zeppelin songs in a reggae style with an Elvis impersonator singer, the vocalist's assistant is called Charlie Haj in tribute to Hodge.

== Film appearances ==
Hodge performed in several of Presley's films. Although often recognized by Charlie Hodge fans in these films, his name does not appear in the films' credits.

Year	Film	Role	Notes
1967	Clambake	Mr. Hayward's barber	uncredited
1968	Speedway	Guitar player	uncredited
1968	Stay Away, Joe	Guitar player	uncredited
1969	Charro!	Mexican peon	uncredited
1979	Elvis	Himself	
