= Ralph Grasso =

American session guitarist

- Ralph Grasso (2009)

Background information
- Birth name: Ralph Santo Grasso
- Born: March 5, 1934; Newark, New Jersey, US
- Died: September 21, 2021 (aged 87); Arizona, US
- Genres: Film score
- Occupation: Guitarist
- Instrument: 6 string guitar
- Spouse: Leah

Ralph Santo Grasso (March 5, 1934 – September 14, 2021) was an American guitar player and a session guitarist from Newark, New Jersey. During his career he worked as a session musician and he also worked on television and film scores.

== Early life ==
Grasso was born March 5, 1934, and grew up in Newark, New Jersey. He claimed in an interview that his family was poor without heat or hot water. He also claimed the family lived in an empty store front and shared a toilet with fourteen families. When he was a boy someone gave him a guitar and he said, "It was a small, three-quarter guitar with a Hawaiian scene painted on it." Ralph's father had musician friends who gave him guitar lessons. In 1952 both he and brother Robert signed up for the Naval Reserve and he auditioned for the Navy bandmaster. Grasso was talented and he was admitted to the Navy Band. His guitar playing won him an international Navy music contest.

== Career ==
While in the Navy Grasso made an appearance on the "Ed Sullivan show. He became friends with a singer named Randy Sparks and was talked into moving to Los Angeles in 1958. In Los Angeles Grasson became friends with Hugo Montenegro and the two wrote a film score.

Beginning in the 1950s Grasso worked on movie scores, television shows and as a session musician for Frank Sinatra and other artists. During his career he appeared regularly on "The Glen Campbell Goodtime Hour," and "The Jonathan Winters Show". He also did work for artists Jimmie Rodgers and Ella Fitzgerald and he did film scores for Elvis Presley's films. Grasso also performed for US Presidents: Dwight D. Eisenhower, Nixon, Gerald Ford, Jimmy Carter and Ronald Reagan. He also performed for Vice President Walter Mondale and Queen Elizabeth The Queen Mother.

In 1974 he started a company called Seagull Publishing in Los Angeles.

== Personal life ==
Grasso moved to Quail Creek resort community in Southern Arizona and gave guitar lessons and held clinics and workshops. He was married to Leah in 1983 and they were married for 38 years (until his death). He died September 14, 2021, after having heart surgery.
