= A Little Less Conversation =

1968 single by Elvis Presley

- The original picture sleeve of the 1968 single

Single by Elvis Presley

from the album Almost in Love
- A-side: "Almost in Love"
- Released: September 3, 1968
- Recorded: March 7, 1968
- Studio: Western Recorders, Hollywood
- Genre: Rock and roll
- Length: 2:28
- Label: RCA Victor
- Songwriters: Mac Davis; Billy Strange
- Producer: Elvis Presley

Elvis Presley singles chronology
"Let Yourself Go" / "Your Time Hasn't Come Yet, Baby" (1968)	"Almost in Love" / "A Little Less Conversation" (1968)	"If I Can Dream" / "Edge of Reality" (1968)

"A Little Less Conversation" is a 1968 song recorded by American singer Elvis Presley, written by Mac Davis and Billy Strange and published by Gladys Music, Inc., originally performed in the film Live a Little, Love a Little. The song became a minor hit in the United States when released as a single with "Almost in Love" as the A-side. A 2002 remix by Dutch musician Junkie XL of a later re-recording of the song by Presley became a worldwide hit, topping the singles charts in nine countries and was awarded certifications in ten countries by 2003.

The song has made numerous appearances in popular culture and has been covered by several artists.

== Original recordings ==
"A Little Less Conversation" was first recorded on March 7, 1968, at Western Recorders in Hollywood, California, and released on a single backed by "Almost in Love", another song from the movie. The song was not released on an LP until November 1970, when it was included on the RCA Camden budget label LP Almost in Love. There are several different takes that were made of the song in the session on March 7. The single version used take 16, which was also used for the soundtrack of the film. The version released on the Almost in Love album is take 10, which is one second longer in duration.

The musicians on the March 7 recording session included Hal Blaine, drums; Al Casey, guitar and Larry Knechtel, bass.

== 1968 television special re-recording ==
It was thought Presley re-recorded the song in June 1968 for the soundtrack of his 1968 comeback special, with the intent of performing it during the program (in part due to Live a Little, Love a Little being scheduled for release about a month before the special's broadcast date). Ultimately, it was decided not to use this recording, and the song was dropped from the planned special. The newer version transposed the key of A major recording of three months earlier into E major and featured a vocal and heavy reverb with backup vocals from The Blossoms. In the mid-1990s, Joseph A. Tunzi sold this recording to Bertelsmann Music Group and it was initially included on the 1998 release Memories: The '68 Comeback Special. Tunzi had been the first to document this recording in his 1996 book Elvis Sessions II: The Recorded Music of Elvis Aron Presley 1953-1977. After the tapes from the original session were rediscovered, it is now known to be take 2, recorded on March 7, 1968.

== Charts ==
Chart (1968)	Peak position
US Billboard Hot 100	69

== Junkie XL / JXL remix ==
"A Little Less Conversation"

Single by Elvis vs. JXL

from the album ELV1S: 30 No. 1 Hits
- Released: June 10, 2002
- Recorded: 1968 (original vocals and instrumental)
- Length: 3:30 (radio edit); 6:09 (extended remix); 6:22 (album version)
- Label: RCA
- Songwriters: Morris Davis; William Strange
- Producers: Junkie XL; Ad Bradley

Junkie XL singles chronology
"B Y Whop to the Y" / "Siyncho" (2002)	"A Little Less Conversation" (2002)	"Obsession" (2002)

Audio sample
- file; help

Music video
- "A Little Less Conversation" on YouTube

Following the song's use in the 2001 film Ocean's Eleven, "A Little Less Conversation" was remixed by Dutch musician Tom Holkenborg, better known as Junkie XL (billed as JXL (Note: Likely due to drug associations with the word 'Junkie'.)). The electronic remix featured Elvis with his baritone voice, and added emphasis to the 1968 guitars, horns, and a funk drum beat. Holkenborg is the first artist outside the Presley organization to receive authorization from the Presley estate to remix a Presley song (in the 1980s, Presley's longtime producer Felton Jarvis had overseen remixes of a number of Elvis recordings that saw new backing added to Presley's original vocals, the first of which were released as the album Guitar Man in 1981). The electronic version of the song became a number-one hit in the UK in 2002. The song also became a top-10 hit in many other countries, reaching number one in 13 of them.

In 2002, "A Little Less Conversation" as remixed by Junkie XL was used for Nike's 2002 FIFA World Cup advertising campaign, titled "Secret Tournament". A single, credited to "Elvis vs. JXL", was issued and went on to become a number-one hit in over 20 countries.

At about the same time, a compilation of Presley's US and UK number-one chart hits, titled ELV1S: 30 No. 1 Hits, was being prepared for release. At the last minute, "A Little Less Conversation (Junkie's remix version)" was added as the album's 31st and final track, just before its release in October 2002. The full 6:09 version was edited slightly and extended to 6:22, and this version was featured on the US version of Junkie XL's 2003 album Radio JXL: A Broadcast from the Computer Hell Cabin.

=== Chart performance ===
In the United States, the song peaked at number 50 on the Billboard Hot 100. It also spent four consecutive weeks at number one on the UK singles chart, which is the only number-one hit by Elvis Presley to be released after his death in 1977. The song was re-released as a single in the United Kingdom in 2005, and reached No. 3.

=== Charts ===
==== Weekly charts ====
2002 weekly chart performance for "A Little Less Conversation"
Chart (2002)	Peak position
Australia (ARIA)	1
Australian Club Chart (ARIA)	1
Australian Dance (ARIA)	1
Austria (Ö3 Austria Top 40)	3
Belgium (Ultratop 50 Flanders)	3
Belgium (Ultratop 50 Wallonia)	8
Belgium Dance (Ultratop Flanders)	1
Canada (Nielsen SoundScan)	1
Croatia (HRT)	5
Czech Republic (IFPI)	8
Denmark (Tracklisten)	1
Europe (Eurochart Hot 100)	2
Finland (Suomen virallinen lista)	6
France (SNEP)	5
Germany (GfK)	8
Greece (IFPI)	7
Hungary (Rádiós Top 40)	1
Hungary (Single Top 40)	1
Ireland (IRMA)	1
Italy (FIMI)	3
Japan (Oricon)	30
Netherlands (Dutch Top 40)	2
Netherlands (Single Top 100)	1
New Zealand (Recorded Music NZ)	1
Norway (VG-lista)	1
Poland (Polish Airplay Charts)	9
Romania (Romanian Top 100)	2
Scottish Singles Sales (Official Charts)	1
Spain (Promusicae)	2
Sweden (Sverigetopplistan)	1
Switzerland (Schweizer Hitparade)	1
UK Singles (Official Charts)	1
US Billboard Hot 100	50
US Adult Pop Airplay (Billboard)	26

2005 weekly chart performance for "A Little Less Conversation"
Chart (2005)	Peak position
Ireland (IRMA)	19
Sweden (Sverigetopplistan)	59
UK Singles (Official Charts)	3

==== Year-end charts ====
2002 year-end chart performance for "A Little Less Conversation"
Chart (2002)	Position
Australia (ARIA)	3
Australian Club Chart (ARIA)	38
Australian Dance (ARIA)	1
Austria (Ö3 Austria Top 40)	21
Belgium (Ultratop 50 Flanders)	16
Belgium (Ultratop 50 Wallonia)	44
Canada (Nielsen SoundScan)	4
Europe (Eurochart Hot 100)	13
France (SNEP)	75
Germany (Media Control)	30
Ireland (IRMA)	11
Italy (FIMI)	18
Netherlands (Dutch Top 40)	8
Netherlands (Single Top 100)	7
New Zealand (RIANZ)	20
Spain (AFYVE)	9
Sweden (Hitlistan)	7
Switzerland (Schweizer Hitparade)	5
UK Singles (OCC)	5
UK Airplay (Music Week)	3

2005 year-end chart performance for "A Little Less Conversation"
Chart (2005)	Position
UK Singles (OCC)	155

==== Decade-end charts ====
Decade-end chart performance for "A Little Less Conversation"
Chart (2000–2009)	Position
Australia (ARIA)	36
Netherlands (Single Top 100)	61
UK Singles (OCC)	31

=== Certifications ===
Certifications for "A Little Less Conversation"
Region	Certification	Certified units/sales
Australia (ARIA)	2× Platinum	140,000^{^}
Austria (IFPI Austria)	Gold	15,000^{*}
Belgium (BRMA)	Gold	25,000^{*}
Denmark (IFPI Danmark)	Platinum	8,000^{^}
France (SNEP)	Silver	125,000^{*}
Netherlands (NVPI)	Gold	40,000^{^}
New Zealand (RMNZ)	Gold	5,000^{*}
Norway (IFPI Norway)	2× Platinum	20,000^{*}
Sweden (GLF)	Platinum	30,000^{^}
Switzerland (IFPI Switzerland)	Platinum	40,000^{^}
United Kingdom (BPI)	2× Platinum	1,200,000^{‡}
United States (RIAA)	Gold	500,000^{*}
United States (RIAA) Video Single	6× Platinum	300,000^{^}
^{*} Sales figures based on certification alone.^{^} Shipments figures based on certification alone.^{‡} Sales+streaming figures based on certification alone.

=== Release history ===
Release dates and formats for "A Little Less Conversation"
Region	Date	Format(s)	Label(s)	Ref(s).
United Kingdom	June 10, 2002	12-inch vinyl; CD; cassette	RCA; BMG	
Japan	June 12, 2002	CD	RCA; BMG	
Australia	June 17, 2002	CD	RCA; BMG	
United States	July 8, 2002	Radio	RCA; BMG	
