= Edge of Reality (song) =

Single by Elvis Presley

from the album Almost in Love
- A-side: "If I Can Dream"
- B-side: "Edge of Reality"
- Released: November 5, 1968
- Recorded: March 7, 1968
- Genre: Psychedelic soul
- Length: 3:15
- Label: RCA Victor
- Songwriters: Bernie Baum; Bill Giant; Florence Kaye

Elvis Presley singles chronology
"Almost in Love" / "A Little Less Conversation" (1968)	"If I Can Dream" / "Edge Of Reality" (1968)	"Memories" (1969)

"Edge of Reality" is a song first recorded by Elvis Presley as part of the soundtrack for his 1968 motion picture Live a Little, Love a Little, released to cinemas on October 23.

In October or November 1968 it was released on a single (RCA Victor 47–9670) with "If I Can Dream" (from his soon to be released album Elvis, the soundtrack for the upcoming NBC TV comeback special) on the other side. The single was the first Presley record on the orange label.

On December 1, 1970, the single "If I Can Dream" / "Edge of Reality" was re-released as part of RCA Victor's Gold Standard Series (together with nine other Presley singles).

== Writing and recording ==
The song was written by Bernie Baum, Bill Giant, and Florence Kaye.

Elvis Presley recorded it in March 1968.

== Tame Impala remix ==
Tame Impala remixed this song for the Baz Luhrmann 2022 film Elvis and was included in the film's soundtrack.

== Charts ==
Chart (1968)	Peak position
U.S. Billboard Bubbling Under the Hot 100	112

Chart (1969)	Peak position
Australia Kent Music Report	2
