= Steve Binder =

American director and producer (born 1932)

- Born: Irwin Sheppard Binder; December 12, 1932 (age 93); Los Angeles, California, U.S.
- Occupations: Producer; director
- Known for: Collaborating with Elvis Presley, directing the Star Wars Holiday Special

Irwin Sheppard "Steve" Binder (born December 12, 1932) is an American producer and director. He found success behind the camera on television shows showcasing music, when he was only in his early twenties. He was also influential in creating music programs with racially and ethnically diverse casts, featuring a variety of musical styles.

Binder is arguably best known as director of the T.A.M.I. Show, Elvis Presley's '68 Comeback Special, and Diana Ross Live in Central Park, in which a torrential thunderstorm passed through minutes into Ross's first set, and the Star Wars Holiday Special. In addition to working with Petula Clark and Elvis Presley, Binder also worked on numerous TV shows and specials with Steve Allen, Soupy Sales, Chevy Chase, Patti LaBelle, Barry Manilow, Wayne Newton, Mac Davis, Liza Minnelli, Pee-wee Herman, and John Denver.

== Partial career ==
=== T.A.M.I. Show ===
In 1964, Binder directed the concert film T.A.M.I. Show. T.A.M.I. Show would go on to be deemed "culturally, historically, or aesthetically significant" by the United States Library of Congress and selected for preservation in 2006 in the National Film Registry.

=== Petula Clark TV special ===
In 1968, Binder was working at NBC. Its executives invited Petula Clark—who had appeared on Hullabaloo—to host her own special. While singing a duet of "On the Path of Glory" with guest Harry Belafonte, she touched his arm, which prompted complaints from the advertising manager of the sponsor of the show, the Plymouth division of Chrysler. The car giant feared the brief moment would offend Southern viewers at a time when racial mixing was still a major issue of controversy in the US. The manager, Doyle Lott, insisted "the touch" (as it became known) should be edited and substituted with a different take. However, director Binder, Clark and her husband/producer refused, destroyed all other takes of the song, and delivered the finished program to NBC with "the touch" intact. Lott blamed fatigue for his reaction, but Belafonte rejected that reasoning and Chrysler relieved Lott of his duties. It aired on April 2, 1968, to high ratings and critical acclaim, and marked the first time a man and woman of different races exchanged physical contact on American television.

=== Elvis Presley's '68 Comeback Special ===
NBC executive Bob Finkel was keen to find a producer/director to work on Singer Presents ... Elvis. Finkel had heard about the controversy of the Clark special, and thought Binder's rebelliousness would suit Elvis. Partner Bones Howe, who had engineered a Presley album, overheard Binder on the phone declining the offer to direct Presley. Howe urged him to change his mind and at least agree to meet the singer.

Subsequently, Binder impressed Presley with his honesty: Elvis asked him where he thought Presley's career was at, and Binder claims to have replied: "I think it's in the toilet." Both Binder and Presley had reservations about doing a TV show; Presley said the recording studio was his turf, so Binder said: "Then why don't you just make a record and I'll put pictures to it?" Presley's manager, Colonel Tom Parker, already had firm ideas for the show: "Thanks to the courage of a young producer named Steve Binder, Elvis did not appear in a tuxedo and croon 'Silent night' to a room of cameramen for his upcoming Christmas special." as Parker had planned. In a move slated to recapture the raw Elvis of the 1950s, Binder continued to stand up to Parker and reunited the star with Scotty Moore and DJ Fontana. Presley was filmed performing informal sessions in front of a live studio audience, where Presley could re-create his rebel image wearing a black leather outfit.

Any lingering doubts Elvis may have had about doing the special were put to rest by one piece of ingenuity by Binder. He took Presley into the street and showed him how virtually no-one recognized him.

According to Samuel Roy, Binder also "tried to warn Elvis of the danger of his environment and the people around him", but the singer was "rather naive and would not listen." Because Presley's manager hated Binder for challenging him, Parker seems to have put an order out that Binder was no longer to get through the Graceland secretaries, who screened all calls.

In 2008, for the 40th anniversary of the "Singer Presents Elvis" television special, Steve Binder wrote his memoir of his time producing the television special titled, "'68 At 40: Retrospective." (JAT Productions.) In 2022, Binder further wrote Elvis '68 Comeback: The Story Behind the Special.

=== Star Wars Holiday Special ===
The Star Wars Holiday Special was a 1978 two-hour prime-time special on CBS that was directed by Binder, starring the original cast of Star Wars along with actors such as Art Carney and Bea Arthur. It combined the Star Wars universe with the traditional television variety show. Generally, the Star Wars Holiday Special has received a large amount of criticism, both from Star Wars fans and the general public. David Hofstede, author of What Were They Thinking?: The 100 Dumbest Events in Television History, ranked the holiday special at number one, calling it "the worst two hours of television ever."

== Podcast appearances ==
Binder has appeared on Peter Anthony's The Stuph File (July 4, 2016), Ken Reid's TV Guidance Counselor (July 15, 2016), The Gilbert Gottfried Amazing Colossal Podcast (November 7, 2016), Skywalking Through Neverland (November 17, 2016), Ed Robertson's TV Confidential (March 2017), Inside The Music (April 30, 2020), and Mark Malkoff’s The Carson Podcast (November 26, 2020).

== Legacy ==
Binder is portrayed by Jack Noseworthy in the 2005 CBS TV miniseries Elvis. Dacre Montgomery portrayed Binder in the 2022 film biography of Elvis Presley. In 2023, a documentary which focused primarily on Binder's experience while producing Elvis' 1968 comeback special, titled Reinventing Elvis: The '68 Comeback, was released on Paramount Plus.
