= If I Can Dream =

Song recorded by Elvis Presley in 1968

Single by Elvis Presley

from the album Elvis
- B-side: "Edge of Reality" "Memories" (UK)
- Released: December 3, 1968
- Recorded: June 23, 1968 (Instrumental backing track); June 29, 1968 (Elvis second session vocal recording)
- Studio: United Western, Hollywood
- Genre: Soul • gospel
- Length: 3:08
- Label: RCA Victor
- Songwriter: Walter Earl Brown
- Producers: Bones Howe, Steve Binder

Elvis Presley singles chronology
"Almost in Love" / "A Little Less Conversation" (1968)	"If I Can Dream" / "Edge of Reality" (1968)	"Charro" (1969)

"If I Can Dream" is a song made famous by Elvis Presley, written by Walter Earl Brown of The Skylarks for the singer and notable for its similarities with Martin Luther King Jr.'s 1963 "I Have a Dream" speech. The song was published by Elvis Presley's music publishing company Gladys Music. It was recorded by Presley in June 1968, just two months after King's assassination, and also a short time after Robert F. Kennedy's assassination. The recording was first released to the public as the finale of Presley's '68 Comeback Special.

== History ==
Composer Billy Goldenberg and lyricist Walter Earl Brown were asked to write a song to replace "I'll Be Home for Christmas" as the grand finale on NBC's Elvis, taped from June 20–23, 1968 (now also known as '68 Comeback Special). Knowing about Presley's fondness for Martin Luther King Jr., and about his devastation related to his then-recent assassination in Memphis, Brown wrote "If I Can Dream" with Presley in mind. After Presley heard the demo, he proclaimed: "I'm never going to sing another song I don't believe in. I'm never going to make another movie I don't believe in".

According to Steve Binder, who directed Elvis' 68 Comeback Special, the song was also motivated by the assassination of Robert F. Kennedy which occurred a few weeks prior to its recording. Binder claimed in a 2005 interview that "One night when we were rehearsing, the television set was on the other room and all of a sudden there was this moment of silence. And I said, 'I think Bobby Kennedy's just been shot'. And we all rushed into the other office and that's exactly what happened. They had live at the Ambassador Hotel, Kennedy making his speech. We were in the piano room at the time, but there was just something weird that evening and I just sensed something had gone wrong. Then we spent the whole night basically talking about the Kennedy assassination, of both Bobby and John."

Goldenberg removed his name from the credits to avoid a publishing dispute. The song was published by Presley's company Gladys Music, Inc.

After Colonel Tom Parker heard the demo of the song sent by Earl Brown, he said: "This ain't Elvis' kind of song." Elvis was also there, and after countering Parker's argument, pleaded: "Let me give it a shot, man." Binder claimed that Parker in fact wanted Elvis to "come out in a tux and sing Christmas songs." Earl Brown said while Elvis recorded the song, he saw tears rolling down the cheeks of the backing vocalists. One of them whispered to him: "Elvis never sung with so much emotion. Looks like he means every word." Presley associate Jerry Schilling has said, "I consider Elvis to be a writer on this song. That song was him expressing how he truly felt."

== Recording success ==
After filming for the TV special was complete with its eventual editing, the song was released as a single with "Edge of Reality" as the flip side on November 22, 1968, with the TV special airing 11 days later. It charted on Billboard's Hot 100 for 3 months and a week, peaking at No. 12, with more than one million sales; although the RIAA certified the song as only gold (500,000 units shipped) as of March 27, 1992. In Canada, the song peaked at No. 6 on RPM's top singles chart, maintaining that position for two weeks.

=== Charts ===
==== Weekly charts ====
Chart (1968–69)	Peak position
Australia (Kent Music Report)	2
Canada RPM Top Singles	6
Ireland (IRMA)	13
Italy	13
New Zealand (Listener)	9
South Africa (Springbok)	7
UK Singles (OCC)	11
U.S. Billboard Hot 100	12
U.S. Cash Box Top 100	9

Chart (2007)	Peak position
Ireland (IRMA)	27
UK Singles (OCC)	17

==== Year-end charts ====
Chart (1969)	Rank
Canada (RPM)	57
U.S. (Joel Whitburn's Pop Annual)	106

== Certifications ==
Region	Certification	Certified units/sales
United Kingdom (BPI)	Platinum	600,000^{‡}
United States (RIAA)	Gold	500,000^{^}
^{^} Shipments figures based on certification alone.^{‡} Sales+streaming figures based on certification alone.

== Compilations ==
The song appeared in many Presley compilations, of which many are related to the '68 Comeback Special or Inspirational collections. Sony BMG remastered the song in 2004. The song is referred to as stereo mix (as opposed to the 2004 remaster honorific) in '68 Comeback Special releases after 2004. Other compilations, such as Platinum: A Life in Music, include alternative takes on the song less polished than the official takes. For instance, the background vocalists are not present in most of these takes, specifically with "If I Can Dream". According to unsubstantiated rumors, Presley nailed the perfect take after the backing vocalists left the studio. In 2015, an orchestrated version was released on the album of the same name.

== Cover versions ==
- In 1990, Barry Manilow's cover reached No. 81 on the UK Singles Chart.
- Michael Ball's version went to No. 51 in the UK in 1992.
- Christian rock band Mad at the World covered the song on their 1992 album, Through the Forest.
- Della Reese covered the song on the 1999 Touched by an Angel Christmas album
- A 2010 version by Terry Venables went to No. 23 in the UK.
- At the Eurovision Song Contest 2022, Italian band Måneskin performed a version of the song that was later included in the soundtrack of the film Elvis. The song reached No. 95 on the Lithuanian charts.
- Ed Ames on his 1969 album A Time for Living, a Time for Hope
- John Raitt on his 1970 album The Giant
- Celine Dion on the 2012 album The Best of Celine Dion & David Foster
- Michael Feinstein & Cheyenne Jackson - The Power of Two (2009)
- Mojo Nixon on the 1995 album Whereabouts Unknown
- Sofronio Vasquez on season 26, episode 18, of The Voice.

== See also ==
- List of anti-war songs
- Civil rights movement in popular culture
