= Memories (Elvis Presley song) =

Single by Elvis Presley

from the album Elvis
- A-side: "If I Can Dream" (UK); "Charro" (US)
- Released: February 25, 1969
- Recorded: June 24, 1968
- Studio: Western Recorders, Hollywood
- Genre: Baroque pop
- Label: RCA Victor
- Songwriters: Billy Strange, Mac Davis

Elvis Presley singles chronology
"If I Can Dream" (1968)	"Memories" / "Charro" (1969)	"How Great Thou Art" (1969)

Elvis Presley UK singles chronology
"Almost in Love" / "A Little Less Conversation" (1968)	"If I Can Dream" / "Memories" (1968)	"In the Ghetto" (1969)

Music video
- "Memories" (with the Royal Philharmonic Orchestra, 2016) (official audio) on YouTube

"Memories" is a 1968 song originally recorded by Elvis Presley.

It was written by Billy Strange and Mac Davis specially for Presley to perform on Elvis, his comeback TV special that would air on NBC on December 3, 1968. Later Mac Davis recalled to Billboard: "They had asked for a song about looking back over the years, and oddly enough, I had to write it in one night. I stayed up all night at Billy Strange's house in Los Angeles. He had a little office set up in his garage. I wrote it right there."

Released in the United States in 1969 accompanied by "Charro", the title song from the movie Charro!, on the B-side, "Memories" reached number 35 on the Billboard Hot 100 for the week of April 12, 1969.

The song is also included on the album Elvis, the soundtrack album for the NBC TV special at which it was first performed. For the TV show itself the song was recorded live, but the album features a studio version recorded on June 24.

The book Rock Song Index: The 7500 Most Important Songs for the Rock and Roll Era calls the song "Memories" the "hallmark of Elvis' later period".

== Charts ==
Elvis Presley

Chart (1969–70)	Peak position
Australia	19
Canada RPM Adult Contemporary	7
Canada RPM Top Singles	15
US Billboard Hot 100	35
US Billboard Adult Contemporary	7
US Country	56
US Cash Box Top 100	24

The Lettermen (medley)

Chart (1969–70)	Peak position
Canada RPM Adult Contemporary	3
Canada RPM Top Singles	37
US Billboard Hot 100	47
US Billboard Adult Contemporary	3
US Cash Box Top 100	51

== Re-release ==
On December 1, 1970, the single was re-released as part of RCA Victor's Gold Standard Series (together with nine other Presley's singles).

== Cover versions ==
- In late 1969, the Lettermen recorded a medley of "Memories" with "Traces" which missed the US Top 40 but reached number three on the Easy Listening chart.
- Nancy Sinatra recorded a cover version in 1969, for her album Nancy on Reprise Records.
- The Free Design covered the song on their 1969 album Heaven/Earth.
- Andy Williams on the 1969 album Happy Heart
- Al Martino on the 1969 album Sausalito
- Mac Davis on his 1970 album Song Painter
- Connie Eaton on her 1971 album Something Special
- Ral Donner in 1979 on the album 1935–1977 – I've Been Away for Awhile Now
- Peter Williams on his 2011 album Remembering Elvis
- The Royal Philharmonic Orchestra recorded a version in 2016 featuring the Elvis Presley vocals
