= Baby What You Want Me to Do =

Blues standard written by Jimmy Reed

Single by Jimmy Reed

from the album Found Love
- B-side: "Caress Me, Baby"
- Released: November 1959
- Recorded: Chicago, August 7, 1959
- Genre: Blues
- Length: 2:22
- Label: Vee-Jay
- Songwriter: Jimmy Reed

Jimmy Reed singles chronology
"I Wanna Be Loved" (1959)	"Baby What You Want Me to Do" (1959)	"I Found Love" (1960)

"Baby What You Want Me to Do" (sometimes called "You Got Me Running" or "You Got Me Runnin'") is a blues song that was written and recorded by Jimmy Reed in 1959. It was a record chart hit for Reed and, as with several of his songs, it has appeal across popular music genres, with numerous recordings by a variety of musical artists.

== Composition and recording ==
"Baby What You Want Me to Do" is a mid-tempo blues shuffle in the key of E that features "[Jimmy] Reed's unique, lazy loping style of vocals, guitar and harmonica." In a 1959 review by Billboard magazine, it was called "uninhibited and swampy ... deliver[ed] freely in classic, gutbucket fashion." Music critic Cub Koda describes it as "deceptively simple" and as "one of the true irreducibles [sic] of the blues, a song so basic and simple it seems like it's existed forever." However, unlike a typical twelve-bar blues, it includes chord substitutions in bars nine and ten:

I	I	I	I	IV	IV	I	I	II–V	II–V	I	I–V

Backing Reed are his wife Mary "Mama" Reed on harmony vocal, Eddie Taylor and Lefty Bates on guitars, Marcus Johnson on bass, and Earl Phillips on drums.

Jimmy Reed received the sole credit for the song, although blues historian Gerard Herzhaft points out "like almost all of Reed's pieces and whatever the official credits are, it is an original composition by his wife, Mama Reed." Mama Reed can be heard at the recording session for the song:

Calvin Carter (Vee-Jay record producer): What's the name of this?
Mama Reed: Uh...
Carter: "You Got Me Doin' What You Want Me?" Oh yeah...
Jimmy Reed: Naw...
Mama Reed: "Baby What You Wanna Let Go."
Carter: No, "Baby What You Want Me to Do." "Baby What You Want Me to Do."
Mama & Jimmy Reed: "Baby Why You Wanna Let Go."
Mama Reed: Yeah.
Jimmy Reed: You could even make it "Why Let Go." Make it short. "Why Let Go."

Nowhere in the song do the lyrics "baby what you want me to do" appear, although later cover versions often wrongly include the phrase in place of the original "baby why you wanna let go." "Baby What You Want Me to Do" is included on Jimmy Reed's second album Found Love (1960), the Jimmy Reed at Carnegie Hall album (1961), as well as numerous compilation albums.

== Recognition and legacy ==
In 1960, "Baby What You Want Me to Do" reached number 10 on the Billboard Hot R&B Singles chart and number 37 on the magazine's Hot 100. In 2004, Reed's song was inducted into the Blues Foundation Hall of Fame in the "Classic of Blues Recordings" category. Herzhaft identifies the song as a blues standard. Koda commented: "Baby What You Want Me to Do" "was already a barroom staple of blues, country, and rock & roll bands by the early '60s".

== Notable cover versions ==
The song continues to be performed and recorded, making it perhaps the most covered of Reed's songs and has spawned versions by a variety of blues, R&B, and rock artists:

- A live version by Etta James is included on her 1963 album Etta James Rocks the House. For her performance, "James does a growling, harmonica-imitating vocal solo", according to an AllMusic reviewer. In 1964, Chess Records' subsidiary Argo released it as a single that reached number 84 on the Hot 100 (the R&B chart was suspended at the time).
- In 1968, Elvis Presley performed "Baby What You Want Me to Do" during his '68 Comeback Special for NBC television. Music educator and author James Perone called it "particularly notable, as the concert in part served as a reminder to the audience of Presley's blues and R&B musical roots". The song is included on the Elvis 1968 album culled from the special and several reissues and compilations.
