= Elvis (1968 TV program) =

1968 American television special

- Publicity poster for the special, seen in Singer stores
- Also known as: Singer Presents ... Elvis '68 Comeback Special
- Written by: Chris Bearde; Allan Blye
- Directed by: Steve Binder
- Starring: Elvis Presley
- Composer: Billy Goldenberg
- Country of origin: United States
- Original language: English

Production
- Producers: Steve Binder; Bones Howe
- Production location: Burbank, California
- Editors: Wayne Kenworthy; Armond Poitras
- Camera setup: Multi-camera
- Running time: 50 minutes

Original release
- Network: NBC
- Release: December 3, 1968

Singer Presents ... Elvis, commonly referred to as the '68 Comeback Special, is an Elvis Presley concert television special that aired on NBC on December 3, 1968. It marked Presley's return to live performance after a seven-year period during which he focused on his film appearances.

The concert was initially planned as a Christmas special by the network and Presley's manager, Colonel Tom Parker. Producer Bob Finkel hired director Steve Binder, who, rather than creating a Christmas special, created a concert that would reflect the musical trends of the time and appeal to a younger audience. Filming took place in June 1968 at NBC Studios in Burbank, California. The special included a sit-down session that showcased Presley in an informal setting, surrounded by fans and a small band.

The special received positive reviews and topped the Nielsen television ratings for the week in which it aired. It became the most-watched show of the television season, earning 42% of the television audience. Later known as the Comeback Special, it relaunched Presley's singing career.

== Background ==
After he returned from serving in the United States Army in March 1960, Presley enjoyed success with his album releases. G.I. Blues, the soundtrack album to his 1960 film G.I. Blues, topped both the Billboard pop albums chart and the UK Albums Chart in October 1960. On March 25, 1961, Presley played a concert in Hawaii to benefit the construction of the USS Arizona Memorial. It would be his last public performance for seven years. Presley's next number-one album on the Billboard pop albums chart was Something for Everybody, released in June 1961.

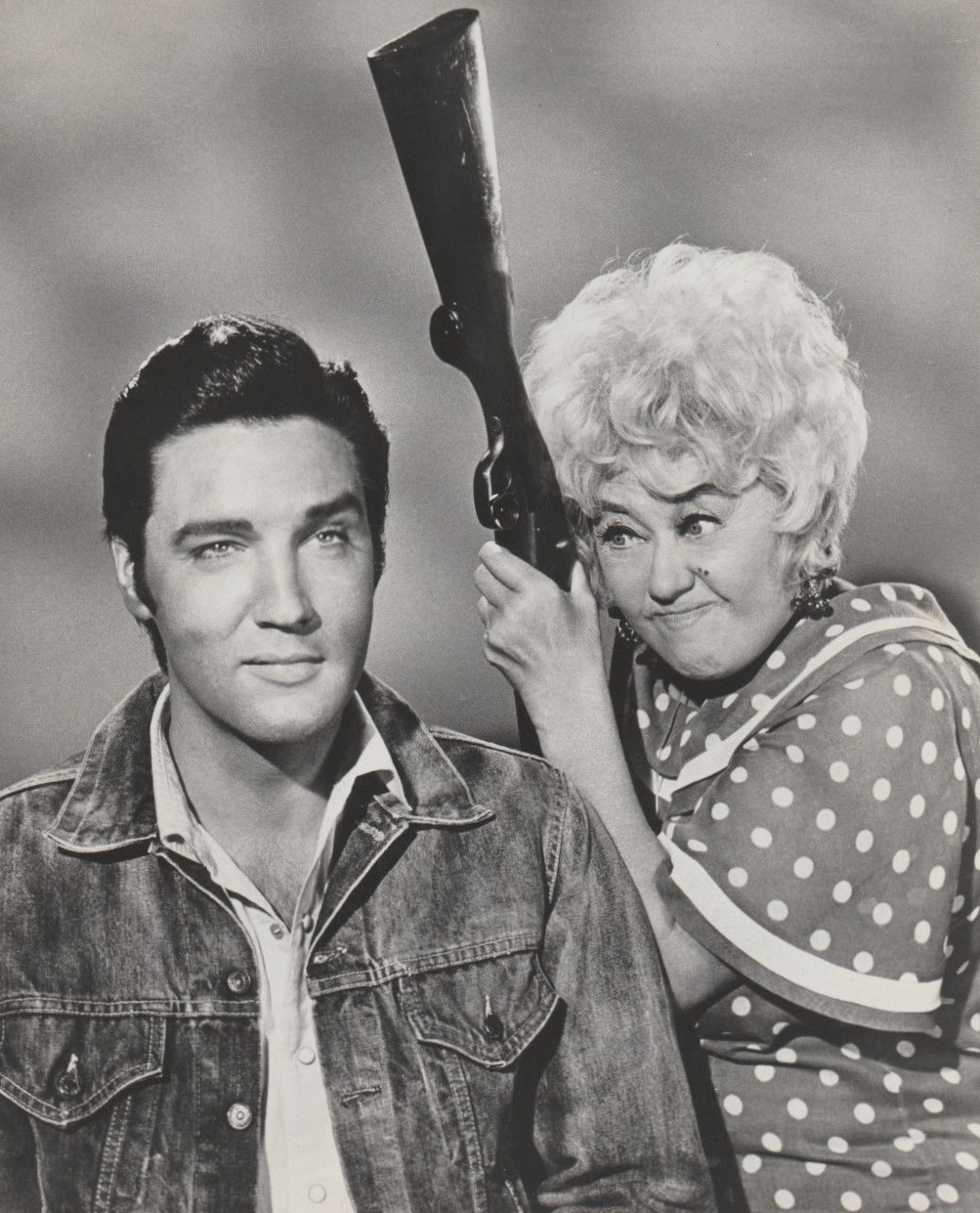
Presley (left) and Joan Blondell in October 1967, featured on a publicity portrait for Stay Away, Joe. After years of working for the film industry, Presley became unhappy with the quality of his roles.

Presley's manager Colonel Tom Parker shifted the focus of Presley's career to films and stopped him from touring. The films were low-budget, formulaic comedies that were successful at the box office, while the resulting albums sold well. Presley attempted to move into more dramatic roles, trying to reduce the prominence of musical numbers to center on his acting with Flaming Star (1960) and Wild in the Country (1961). Both releases flopped, and by 1964 Parker decided to limit all recordings exclusively to film soundtracks. Parker then set the Presley formula: the films would promote album releases, while album releases would promote the films.

To reduce costs, producer Hal Wallis shortened filming schedules, almost abandoning rehearsals and retakes. He stopped shooting on location; all films were to be shot in the studio, and less-experienced crews were used to reduce labor costs. Scenes were limited to long shots, medium shots and close-ups to speed the process. Meanwhile, studio recordings also declined in quality; session musicians did most of the work as Presley simply did not have time to focus on recording. He was paid $750,000 and received 50% of the film profits for his appearance in Tickle Me (1965), a sum that consumed most of the film's budget. Because Allied Artists was experiencing financial problems, Parker inserted unused songs from other studio sessions on the soundtrack and instructed the studio to work them into the film. The tight production worked, and Tickle Me was a box-office success.

Girl Happy (1965) marked the first failure of this approach. The soundtrack was Presley's least successful release, while the film barely grossed $2 million. Despite the success of Parker's model, Presley grew increasingly discontented. With the passage of time, he felt that his connection to the music business was weakening, causing depression and alienation as the quality of his films deteriorated. During a five-year span from 1964 through 1968, Presley had only one top-ten hit, "Crying in the Chapel" (1965), a gospel number recorded in 1960. While the 1964 film Viva Las Vegas enjoyed success, the ensuing films saw a progressive decline. By 1967, the difficulty of negotiating with Parker and the poor performance of the films led Wallis to opt out of his contract with Presley.

== NBC deal ==
In October 1967, Parker approached Tom Sarnoff, NBC West Coast vice president, to propose a Christmas television special. The US$1,250,000 package (about $12.1 million in 2025 prices) included the financing of a motion picture (for US$850,000), its soundtrack (for US$25,000), the television special (US$250,000) and US$125,000 reserved for the costs related to a rerun. The special was to be included in the feature Singer Presents ..., sponsored by the Singer Corporation.

Presley's initial reaction to the special was negative. He felt that it was another scheme concocted by Parker and was angered by the idea of singing Christmas carols on national television. However, his opinion changed after he began talks with the special's producer, Bob Finkel, who persuaded Singer, NBC and Parker to alter the show's original concept. Finkel obtained Parker's approval that the show was to be centered only on Presley, while enough material for a soundtrack album and a Christmas single was to be recorded. Presley's enthusiasm for the project grew, and he assured Finkel that he was ready to perform new material, different from anything he had previously done. He had no interest in Parker's opinion of the project.

To reflect the new intended direction of Presley's career, Finkel recruited director Steve Binder, who had directed the concert film T.A.M.I. Show and worked for NBC on Hullabaloo and a Petula Clark special. Finkel felt that hiring Binder would refresh Presley's image and that Binder would be able to introduce Presley to new audiences. Initially reluctant to direct the special, Binder was convinced by his associate Bones Howe, who had met Presley during the 1950s while he worked at Radio Recorders as an audio engineer. He insisted on working with Presley as he thought that Binder had similar production methods. A meeting was arranged during which Parker assured that the team would have full creative control but stressed that the publishing rights must be under Presley's name. Howe and Binder met with Presley later that week and informed him that they would prepare all of the details for the special by the time that Presley returned from his planned vacation in Hawaii.

== Production ==
Binder and Howe hired the production crew, repeating their collaboration with various people whom they had used for past specials. Billy Goldenberg was assigned as the musical director, while the Presley camp chose Billy Strange as the arranger. Chris Bearde and Allan Blye were hired as the writers, and Bill Belew for the costume design. Bearde and Blye proposed an idea based on Maurice Maeterlinck's The Blue Bird that was intended to portray Presley's career through his songs. Singer's representative Alfred Discipio approved the idea, as did Parker. The snippets of the story were connected by a number covering Jerry Reed's "Guitar Man". An informal segment was planned featuring Presley talking to members of his entourage in a scripted conversation that was to show him as self-deprecating while discussing his film performances. A gospel number would be added, as well as a live standup performance. The Christmas song, requested by Parker, would then be played, and the special would close with a spoken statement by Presley. According to Binder, Parker wanted Elvis to "come out in a tux and sing Christmas songs." Binder, however, wanted Presley to express his feelings about the current social climate, as Presley had been moved by the recent assassinations of Senator Robert F. Kennedy and Reverend Martin Luther King Jr. King's assassination deeply touched Presley, who felt that the murder, which occurred in Memphis, Tennessee, "only confirmed everyone's worst feelings about the south."

By June 3, Presley returned to Hollywood to start the rehearsals that would last for two weeks. Howe insisted on the possibility of a soundtrack album from which he would earn royalties as its producer. NBC saw Howe's attitude as a potential danger to the special and ordered Binder to remove him from the staff. The production was further complicated when Goldenberg complained to Binder that Strange had not completed any musical arrangements for the special with only two weeks before the end of preproduction. Strange left the project, alleging that he was too busy with other projects. A week before the end of rehearsals, the production team allowed Howe to return as producer and engineer.

Presley performing in the special

On June 4, Senator Robert Kennedy was shot at the Ambassador Hotel in Los Angeles after giving a live television speech; he died two days later. Binder stated in a 2005 interview with Elvis Australia that "One night when we were rehearsing, the television set was on the other room and all of a sudden there was this moment of silence. And I said, 'I think Bobby Kennedy's just been shot'. And we all rushed into the other office and that's exactly what happened. They had live at the Ambassador Hotel, Kennedy making his speech. We were in the piano room at the time, but there was just something weird that evening and I just sensed something had gone wrong. Then we spent the whole night basically talking about the Kennedy assassination, of both Bobby and John." According to Binder, this event would further motivate Presley to record "If I Can Dream" as the special's closing number.

On June 17, the team moved to the NBC studios in Burbank, California. Goldenberg asked Finkel to remove Presley's large entourage from the production area, complaining that they interfered with the creative process. Presley worked with choreographer Lance LeGault on the planned numbers, and Belew worked with the costumes.

Binder and Howe developed the concept of the informal section of the show after seeing Presley interacting with his entourage while playing music during breaks. Binder planned to shoot the segment in the locker room to give the public a sense of how Presley's music was developed in an intimate setting, but Parker opposed this concept. Binder settled for a sit-down concert on a small stage that resembled a boxing ring. He called Presley's first backup musicians, Scotty Moore and DJ Fontana, to accentuate the nature of Presley's musical origins (Presley's original bassist Bill Black had died in 1965). They were also joined by two members of Presley's entourage, Charlie Hodge and Alan Fortas. The scripted part was canceled but the writers gave Presley a list of topics to discuss between songs. The topics included mentions of his early career, his Hollywood years and the current music business.

On June 20, Presley started the recording process at United Western Recorders. Howe arranged for the rhythm section, session musicians from Los Angeles. The band was composed of drummer Hal Blaine and guitarists Mike Deasy and Tommy Tedesco. Members of the string and brass sections of the NBC orchestra were also enlisted. All of the special's music, except for that of the live sections, was prerecorded by Presley. It was to be blended with live vocals during the production numbers, which were taped on June 27.

On the same day, Presley taped the first sit-down show. Parker had told the NBC team that he would handle ticket distribution. He assured them that he would recruit fans from across the country to fill the studio. However, by the day of the show, Parker had not distributed the tickets, and only a few people were in line to see the taping. Binder and Finkel invited people from a restaurant across the street and aired a radio announcement to gather an audience. Presley was nervous at the beginning of the first hour-long set. Binder had to convince him to take the stage, but once there, Presley was comfortable. He performed his songs and traded jokes with his companions as the session progressed. By the end of the first show, Belew had to carefully remove the sweat-soaked leather suit that was now stuck to Presley's skin. To prepare the suit for the next show, Belew had to wash it by hand. He was helped by the costume crew, who used hairdryers to hasten the process. During the first show, the producers were concerned about the effects of the toe-tapping on the recordings, so for the 8 p.m. show, rubber mats were placed at the feet of Presley and the band members. The second show found Presley relaxed and running through the set list with ease.

On June 29, Presley recorded both stand-up sessions. As with the first two shows, the cameras that shot Presley from different angles did not have individual taping machines. The director would choose the camera angle that he desired and the cameras would then feed either of the two available taping machines. The arrangements of the songs for the stand-up shows were fast-paced, and Presley accompanied them with shakes, gyrations and facial expressions that he emphasized with fist gestures and knee-drops.

For the show's closer, Binder decided to replace the spoken statement with a song. He instructed Goldenberg and lyricist Walter Earl Brown to write a song that reflected Presley and his beliefs, and Brown wrote "If I Can Dream" that same night. Binder sent it to Parker, who still thought that the show closer was to be "I'll Be Home for Christmas". After Parker's negative response to the song, Binder bypassed him and played the song for Presley. After hearing it three times, Presley was convinced that he should record it. Seeing Presley's determination, Parker demanded 100 percent of the publishing rights. Goldenberg removed his name from the publishing sheet and told Parker that Brown had written the song. For the "If I Can Dream" number, Presley wore a three-piece white suit designed by Belew. A large sign in red letters that read ELVIS was placed on a black background, and Presley performed the song with a hand-held microphone. After finishing the song, Presley closed the special by saying "Thank you, Good night."

== Release and reception ==
The special's final running time was fifty minutes, edited from four hours of taping; Presley was satisfied with the result. Singer Presents...Elvis aired five months later on Tuesday, December 3, at 9 p.m. EST. It placed first in the Nielsen television ratings for the week ending on December 8, displacing Rowan & Martin's Laugh-In (also on NBC), which dropped to the second position. Forty-two percent of the total television audience viewed it, making it the most-watched show of the season. The special's soundtrack was released shortly afterward. It reached number eight on Billboard's Top LPs chart, and by July 1969, it was certified gold. The special was shown in the United Kingdom on 31 December 1969 on BBC2 under the title The Fabulous Elvis.

In his review for The New York Times, critic Robert Shelton wrote: "Parts of the hour program were unbelievably stagey, but other parts were believably effective and natural glimpses of one of the pop-culture phenomenons of the century at work where he works best, in music. ... What this special points out is that this charismatic performer was at his best 10 years ago, but he hasn't lost his grip on the best music he had to offer then. Today's rock generation will, more than likely, ask that the real, early Presley stand up."

Despite calling Presley's films "atrocities", a Chicago Tribune reviewer wrote that "it's great to have the old Elvis back" and characterized the performance as "dynamic, compelling, incredibly sensual".

The Los Angeles Times deemed Presley's performance "anticlimactic" in comparison to other rock-and-roll acts of the time. The review assured that Presley "managed to sustain the hour very well" but that "some of the magic was gone, diminished."

The Philadelphia Inquirer wrote: "What separates real from ersatz stars is the quality of excitement, and this Presley generated generously whether singing, swinging, chatting with sidemen and an ecstatic audience or pacing restlessly like a caged animal."

The Associated Press praised the set design as well as Presley's appearance that felt "sort of like old times".

A review by the Newspaper Enterprise Association published in the El Paso Herald-Post held that the special showcased a renewed and "more mature" Presley.

The Daily Tar Heel published a favorable review of the special, remarking on the change since Presley's heyday, declaring: "Elvis still has magic."

The Ottawa Journal praised Presley while noting that he delivered a calmer stage presence compared to that of his early days. The reviewer lamented the editing of the program and the selection of the "cage-like stage" in which Presley appeared to pace "not at ease".

The Guardian defined the performances by Presley as "marvellous stuff, performed with a faint hint of self-mockery" but lamented the inclusion of choreography and "ludicrous choral throbs".

== Aftermath ==
Presley during a stand-up session. The photo was featured on the cover of Rolling Stone in 1969.

After the taping of the first sit-down session, Presley called Parker to his dressing room to inform him that he wanted to return to touring. During a press conference, Parker announced that Presley would soon embark on a "comeback tour". Parker's choice of words angered Presley, who felt that he was being labeled a "has-been". Presley was also interested in further collaboration with Binder, but Parker avoided it.

By January 1969, propelled by the success of the special and with his renewed enthusiasm, Presley began his return to recording non-soundtrack albums with producer Chips Moman. Recorded at American Sound Studio with the house band known as the Memphis Boys, the resulting single "In the Ghetto" reached #3 and was soon followed by a country-soul album titled From Elvis in Memphis. "Suspicious Minds", a standalone single from the sessions released in late August, also topped the charts and became one of Presley's signature songs. In July 1969, Rolling Stone featured Presley on the cover for the first time, featuring a photo from one of the television special's stand-up performances with the black leather outfit.

Parker arranged Presley's return to live performance. He arranged a deal with Kirk Kerkorian, owner of the Las Vegas International Hotel, for Presley to play the newly built, 2,000-seat showroom for four weeks (two shows per night) for $400,000. For his return to Las Vegas, Presley assembled a core rhythm section later given the moniker the TCB Band: James Burton (lead guitar), John Wilkinson (rhythm guitar), Jerry Scheff (bass), Ron Tutt (drums), Larry Muhoberac (piano) and Charlie Hodge (rhythm guitar, stage assistant). Presley also hired two backing vocal groups, the Sweet Inspirations and the Imperials. His initial Las Vegas booking, 57 shows in July–August 1969, attracted a total audience of 101,500, a Las Vegas attendance record. In 1970, Presley toured the U.S. for the first time since October–November 1957, with every show a sellout.

== Media releases ==
=== Rereleases ===
NBC rebroadcast the special in the summer of 1969. The song "Blue Christmas" was replaced by the number "Tiger Man" at Parker's request. In 1977, the program was aired after Presley's death as a special titled Memories of Elvis, hosted by Ann-Margret. It included a bordello scene that was originally approved by the censors but had been removed at the request of the Singer Corporation to avoid controversy.

In 1985, HBO broadcast the first sit-down session of the show under the title Elvis: One Night with You. Elvis Presley Enterprises' business manager Joe Rascoff sold the channel the broadcasting rights for $1,000,000. A home-video version was later released.

In 2004, an Elvis: '68 Comeback Special Deluxe Edition DVD was released. The three-disc set contained all of the known available footage of the special, outtakes included. A single-disc edition was released in 2006 with the program expanded to 94 minutes by adding material from the outtakes to the original broadcast.

In 2023, a documentary which focused primarily on Steve Binder's experience while producing the special, titled Reinventing Elvis: The '68 Comeback, was released on Paramount Plus. In 2024, a documentary film about the special was released on Netflix titled Return of the King: The Fall and Rise of Elvis Presley.

Chart (2004)	Peak position
Australian Top 40 Music DVDs	1
Austrian Top 10 Music DVDs	2
Belgium (Flanders) Top 10 Music DVDs	4
Finnish Top 5 Music DVDs	1
German Albums Chart	72
Japanese DVDs Chart	99
Netherlands Top 30 Music DVDs	2
New Zealand Top 10 Music DVDs	4
Norwegian Top 10 DVDs	1
Swedish Top 20 DVDs	1

Chart (2008)	Peak position
Belgium (Wallonia) Top 10 Music DVDs	1

Region	Certification	Certified units/sales
Australia (ARIA)	6× Platinum	90,000^{^}
Austria (IFPI Austria)	Gold	5,000^{*}
Canada (Music Canada)	3× Platinum	30,000^{^}
France (SNEP)	Platinum	20,000^{*}
New Zealand (RMNZ)	Gold	2,500^{^}
United States (RIAA) 2006 release	2× Platinum	200,000^{^}
United States (RIAA) 2004 release	4× Platinum	133,332^{^}
^{*} Sales figures based on certification alone.^{^} Shipments figures based on certification alone.

=== Soundtrack ===
The special's first single to be released was "If I Can Dream" by RCA Victor (47–9670) in October 1968. It reached number 12 on the Billboard Singles chart and sold 800,000 copies. In November 1968, the live performance of "Tiger Man" appeared on the RCA Camden compilation album Elvis Sings Flaming Star (PRS-279), which was first released through Singer stores and given wide release in April 1969 (CAS 2304).

An official soundtrack album simply titled Elvis was released in December 1968 by RCA (LPM-4088). In March 1969, RCA released "Memories" as a single (47–9730), a song that would later be reused as the closing credits music for the 1972 concert film Elvis on Tour.

Bootleg albums featuring unissued material began circulating as early as 1978. Over the following decades, additional performances from the special were released in parts, particularly in RCA's A Legendary Performer compilation series, as well as in the 1985 box set A Golden Celebration. In the 1990s and 2000s, RCA issued more complete soundtrack recordings, including Memories in 1998, a 30th-anniversary release that was an expansion of the original album. That same year, RCA released Tiger Man, which consisted of the complete sit-down performances. In 2006, RCA released Let Yourself Go: The Making of Elvis the Comeback Special, which consisted of outtakes and rehearsal recordings from the special.

Various recordings from the special were used as the soundtrack for the Elvis pinball machine, released by Stern in 2004. The version of "A Little Less Conversation" originally recorded for (but not used in) the special was later remixed by Junkie XL and became a worldwide hit in 2002. In the United States, the song peaked at number 50 on the Billboard Hot 100 pop singles chart, the first hit for Presley since 1981, and extended his list of charted singles into the 21st century. It also spent four consecutive weeks at number one on the UK Singles Chart.

== In popular culture ==
The sit-down sections of the special were a forerunner of MTV Unplugged, showing for the first time an artist in a casual setting. Falco's video for his 1986 single "Emotional" features him standing in front of a logo formed by red light bulbs that spell FALCO, an image also shown on the cover of his Emotional album. In The Simpsons 1993 episode "Krusty Gets Kancelled", the set of Krusty the Clown's television special mimicks Presley's show. In the video for the 2001 single "Inner Smile", Texas lead singer Sharleen Spiteri is dressed as Presley from the special. The 2002 MTV $2 Bill concert special featuring the Strokes was heavily inspired by the ELVIS program. Robbie Williams' 2002 special The Robbie Williams Show features "Trouble" as the opening song as well as similar set decorations and the letters RW in red. In 2004, Morrissey toured with a stage backdrop that spelled MORRISSEY in large red marquee lights reminiscent of the special's ELVIS sign. The special was portrayed in the 2005 biographical television miniseries Elvis starring Jonathan Rhys Meyers. In 2008, country singer Martina McBride recorded a virtual duet of "Blue Christmas" for the album Christmas Duets. The video for the song features McBride singing with Presley during the sit-down session of the special. Glenn Danzig loosely based his 2013 "Legacy" TV Special on the Presley special. In 2019, Green Day paid tribute to the "Guitar Man" portion of the special's opening number in the video for "Father of All...". Baz Luhrmann's 2022 film Elvis portrays the production of the special, with Billboard indicating "the scenes about the special are considered some of the film's most riveting".
