= Billy Strange =

American singer, songwriter, guitarist and actor (1930–2012)

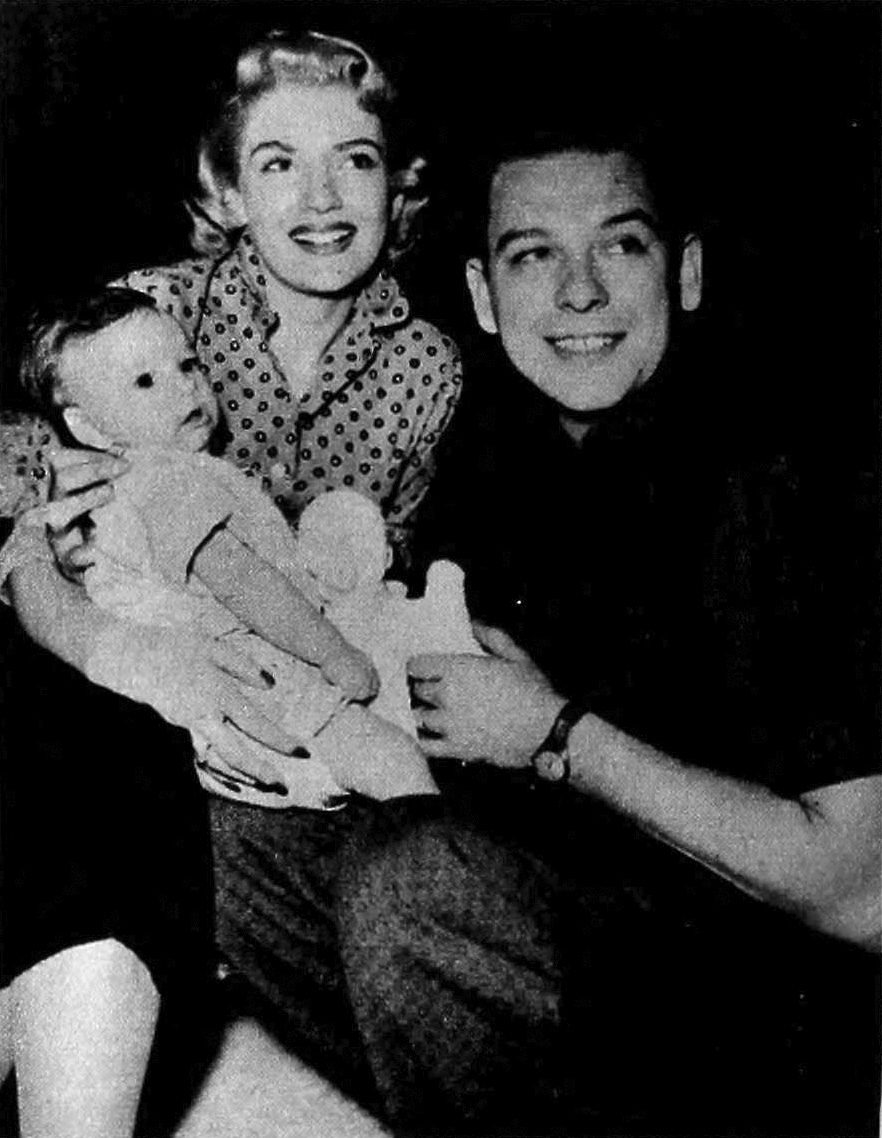
- Strange (right) with his then-wife Joan O'Brien and their child, Rusty, in 1956

Background information
- Born: William Everett Strange; September 29, 1930; Long Beach, California, U.S.
- Died: February 22, 2012 (aged 81) Franklin, Tennessee, U.S.
- Occupations: Musician, composer
- Instrument: Guitar
- Formerly of: The Wrecking Crew

William Everett Strange (September 29, 1930 – February 22, 2012) was an American singer, songwriter, musician, guitarist, and actor. He began as a session musician with the Wrecking Crew, a famous session band of the 1960s and 1970s, and was inducted into the Musicians Hall of Fame and Museum as a member of that ensemble in 2007.

== Biography ==
=== Early life ===
Billy Strange was born in Long Beach, California, on September 29, 1930.

=== Recordings and songwriting ===
Strange teamed up with Mac Davis to write several hit songs for Elvis Presley, including "A Little Less Conversation", the theme from Charro!, and "Memories". Strange also composed the musical soundtrack for two of Presley's films Live a Little, Love a Little and The Trouble with Girls. He also wrote "Limbo Rock" which was recorded by The Champs and Chubby Checker.

Strange recorded arrangements of James Bond movie themes for GNP Crescendo Records and provided the instrumental backing and arrangement for Nancy Sinatra's non-soundtrack version of "You Only Live Twice", as well as Nancy and Frank Sinatra's "Somethin' Stupid". He was recognized by the Rockabilly Hall of Fame for his pioneering contribution to the genre.

Strange played guitar on numerous Beach Boys hits, including "Sloop John B" and the Pet Sounds album. He also played guitar for Nancy Sinatra, Jan & Dean, The Ventures, Willie Nelson, The Everly Brothers, Wanda Jackson, Randy Newman, and Nat King Cole, among others. One of his most famous performances is on Nancy Sinatra's version of "Bang Bang (My Baby Shot Me Down)".

Strange arranged and conducted all of Nancy Sinatra's Reprise albums as well as Nancy Sinatra's and Lee Hazlewood's 1972 RCA Records release, Nancy & Lee Again and their 2003 album, Nancy & Lee 3. He also arranged the 1981 Sinatra and Mel Tillis album, Mel & Nancy. He arranged and conducted for Frank Sinatra, Dean Martin, Sammy Davis Jr., Duane Eddy, and Elvis Presley. One of his most famous arrangements was "These Boots Are Made for Walkin'" for Nancy Sinatra. Strange also performed the vocals for Steve McQueen in Baby the Rain Must Fall.

Heard on the soundtracks of many Disney features, Strange played themes for such TV shows as "The Munsters" (1964), "Batman" (1966), and "Have Gun – Will Travel" (1957). He is the guitarist heard on the theme to "The Munsters".

"A Little Less Conversation", which he wrote with Mac Davis, was on the soundtracks of the DreamWorks animated feature films Shark Tale (2004) and Megamind (2010).

He sang his own composition, "The Ballad of Bunny and Claude", in the Merrie Melodies Bunny And Claude (We Rob Carrot Patches) (1968) and The Great Carrot-Train Robbery (1969).

=== Personal life ===
Strange was son of George Strange, a radio entertainer, and Vella Evans Strange.

Strange was married to singer and actress Joan O'Brien from 1954 to 1955. They had a son, Russell Glen Strange, born on October 4, 1955.

He was also married to Betty Jo Conrad (son: Jerry Strange) from 1960 to 1978. They had a daughter together, Kelly Kimberly Strange, born on November 11, 1964.

While separated from Betty Jo, Strange moved from California to Tennessee to open and run a publishing firm for the Sinatras and lived with/dated Tricia "LeAnn" King. They had a daughter, Mary "Micah" King (Strange), who was born on December 23, 1976, in Lawrenceburg, Tennessee.

Strange was married to singer Jeanne Black in his final years. He died on February 22, 2012, aged 81.

== Selected filmography ==
=== As actor ===
- Coal Miner's Daughter – Speedy West (1980)

=== Film & TV scores ===
- Movin' with Nancy (1967)
- Live a Little, Love a Little (1968)
- Elvis (1968)
- The Trouble with Girls (1969)
- De Sade (1969)
- Bunny O'Hare (1971)
- The Simpsons (1995, 1 episode)
- Ocean's Eleven (2001)
- Smallville (2002, 1 episode)
- Everybody Loves Raymond (2003, 1 episode)
- Bruce Almighty (2003)
- Shark Tale (2004)
- Megamind (2010)

== Selected discography ==
- Billy Strange Plays Roger Miller
- Mr. Guitar
- The James Bond Theme / Walk Don't Run '64
- English Hits of '65
- Goldfinger
- Secret Agent File (later rereleased as a compilation)
- James Bond Double Feature
- In the Mexican Bag
- Great Western Themes
- Billy Strange and The Challengers
- Strange Country
- 12 String Guitar
- Railroad Man
- Dyn-O-Mite Guitar
- Billy Strange Plays the Hits
- Folk Rock Hits
- Folk Hits
- Songs and Sounds of the Steam Era (Compilation of Railroad Man and Folk Hits)
- Super Scary Monster Party (compilation)
- De Sade (film soundtrack)

== Television ==
Year	Title	Role	Notes
1961	Rawhide	Murphy	S3:E27, "Incident Before Black Pass"
