= Sunset Boulevard (box set) =

Box set by Elvis Presley
- Released: August 1, 2025
- Length: 5:28:15
- Label: RCA
- Producer: Matt Ross-Spang

Elvis Presley chronology
Las Vegas Hilton Presents Elvis On Stage February 1973 (2024)	Sunset Boulevard (2025)

Sunset Boulevard is a box set by Elvis Presley, released on August 1, 2025 by RCA Records.

== Background ==
In March 1972, Colonel Tom Parker struck a deal with Metro-Goldwyn-Mayer to make a documentary about Elvis Presley's tour at the time, which had no name at the time, but would eventually be called Elvis on Tour. MGM wanted to include footage of Elvis in the studio rehearsing, which led Presley to recording in RCA Records' Studio C in Los Angeles, California to record 6 new songs and rehearse for his road trip.

== Contents ==
Sunset Boulevard's first disc contains Elvis' 1972 and 1975 recordings from Studio C in LA. The second, third and fourth discs consist of various 1970 and 1974 rehearsals. Liner notes are written by Colin Escott.

== Reception ==
Professional ratings
Review scores
Source	Rating
AllMusic	4/5 stars
Record Collector	4/5 stars
Under the Radar	8/10 stars

Writing for AllMusic, Mark Deming wrote that Ross-Spang's new mixes "find Presley in excellent voice and giving the songs genuine emotional commitment", noting that "it's easy to imagine that with a bit more care and imagination, Presley could have turned these recordings into one of the greatest breakup albums of all time [...] a mature but wounded portrait of a broken heart", he concludes by writing that "The studio masters and their accompanying outtakes make Sunset Boulevard a superior collection of late-period Presley, but think of the rehearsal recordings as a bonus that you needn't examine very often."

== Track listing ==
=== Disc version ===
Disc One: The Masters
No.	Title	Length
1.	"Burning Love"	3:02
2.	"Always on My Mind"	3:39
3.	"Where Do I Go from Here?"	2:45
4.	"Separate Ways"	2:54
5.	"For the Good Times"	3:13
6.	"It's a Matter of Time"	3:05
7.	"Fool"	3:38
8.	"T-R-O-U-B-L-E"	3:03
9.	"And I Love You So"	3:40
10.	"Susan When She Tried"	2:48
11.	"Woman Without Love"	3:35
12.	"Shake a Hand"	3:53
13.	"Pieces of My Life"	3:50
14.	"Fairytale"	3:27
15.	"I Can Help"	4:03
16.	"Bringing It Back"	3:01
17.	"Green, Green Grass of Home"	3:38

Disc Two: Outtake Highlights
No.	Title	Length
1.	"Separate Ways" (take 25)	2:51
2.	"For the Good Times"	3:13
3.	"Where Do I Go from Here" (take 2)	2:37
4.	"Burning Love" (take 2)	2:55
5.	"Fool" (take 1)	3:57
6.	"Always on My Mind" (take 2)	3:51
7.	"It's a Matter of Time" (takes 1–3)	2:57
8.	"It's a Matter of Time" (take 4)	3:05
9.	"Fairytale" (take 2)	3:32
10.	"Green, Green Grass of Home" (takes 2–3)	4:07
11.	"And I Love You So" (take 2)	3:44
12.	"Susan When She Tried" (takes 1–2)	3:55
13.	"T-R-O-U-B-L-E" (take 1)	3:04
14.	"Tiger Man"	3:13
15.	"Shake A Hand" (take 2)	3:34
16.	"Bringin' It Back" (takes 2–3)	3:28
17.	"Pieces Of My Life" (takes 2–3)	4:21

Disc Three: July 24, 1970 Rehearsal
No.	Title	Length
1.	"That's All Right"	2:35
2.	"I Got a Woman"	2:22
3.	"I Got a Woman"	1:11
4.	"The Wonder of You"	5:17
5.	"I've Lost You"	3:55
6.	"The Next Step Is Love"	3:19
7.	"Stranger in the Crowd"	3:48
8.	"You've Lost That Lovin' Feelin'"	4:03
9.	"Something"	2:53
10.	"Don't Cry Daddy"	3:07
11.	"Don't Cry Daddy"	2:49
12.	"You Don't Have to Say You Love Me"	2:45
13.	"Polk Salad Annie"	4:26
14.	"Bridge over Troubled Water"	4:30
15.	"I Can't Stop Loving You"	2:13
16.	"Just Pretend"	4:14
17.	"Sweet Caroline"	3:47
18.	"Love Me Tender"	0:17
19.	"Words"	2:59
20.	"Suspicious Minds"	5:30
21.	"I Just Can't Help Believing"	4:13
22.	"I Just Can't Help Believing"	6:39

Disc Four: July 24, 1970 — Continued
No.	Title	Length
1.	"Tomorrow Never Comes"	5:13
2.	"Mary in the Morning"	4:12
3.	"Twenty Days and Twenty Nights"	4:47
4.	"You've Lost That Lovin' Feelin'"	3:51
5.	"I Just Can't Help Believing"	4:46
6.	"Heart of Rome"	3:08
7.	"Heart of Rome"	1:03
8.	"Memories"	3:53
9.	"Johnny B. Goode"	2:29
10.	"Make the World Go Away"	5:26
11.	"Stranger in My Own Home Town"	5:22
12.	"I Washed My Hands in Muddy Water"	4:48

Disc Five: August 16, 1974 Rehearsal
No.	Title	Length
1.	"If You Love Me (Let Me Know)"	2:44
2.	"If You Love Me (Let Me Know)"	3:02
3.	"Promised Land"	3:13
4.	"Promised Land"	3:39
5.	"Down in the Alley"	2:56
6.	"Down in the Alley"	3:15

Disc Six: August 16, 1974 Rehearsal — Continued
No.	Title	Length
1.	"It's Midnight"	4:14
2.	"It's Midnight"	3:43
3.	"Your Love's Been a Long Time Comin'"	4:10
4.	"Good Time Charlie's Got the Blues"	3:25
5.	"Softly, as I Leave You"	2:27
6.	"Softly, as I Leave You"	5:08
7.	"I'm Leavin'"	5:11
8.	"The First Time Ever I Saw Your Face"	5:22
9.	"Proud Mary"	3:13
10.	"If You Talk in Your Sleep"	4:36
11.	"If You Love Me (Let Me Know)"	7:09
12.	"If You Love Me (Let Me Know)"	8:27
13.	"The Twelfth of Never"	2:54
14.	"Faded Love"	3:29
15.	"Just Pretend"	5:19
Total length:		5:28:15

== Charts ==
2025 chart performance for Sunset Boulevard
Chart (2025)	Peak position
Austrian Albums (Ö3 Austria)	14
Belgian Albums (Ultratop Flanders)	22
Belgian Albums (Ultratop Wallonia)	48
French Albums (SNEP)	170
German Albums (Offizielle Top 100)	17
Dutch Albums (Album Top 100)	18
Scottish Albums (Official Charts)	5
Swiss Albums (Schweizer Hitparade)	9
Spanish Albums (Promusicae)	89
UK Albums (Official Charts)	67
