= The Other Sides – Elvis Worldwide Gold Award Hits Vol. 2 =

Compilation album by Elvis Presley
- Released: August 1971
- Genre: Rock
- Length: 118:08
- Label: RCA Victor

Elvis Presley chronology
C'mon Everybody (1971)	The Other Sides – Elvis Worldwide Gold Award Hits Vol. 2 (1971)	I Got Lucky (1971)

The Other Sides – Elvis Worldwide Gold Award Hits Vol. 2 is a compilation album by American singer and musician Elvis Presley released on August 1, 1971. It was certified Gold on July 15, 1999 by the Recording Industry Association of America. Only five tracks had never been officially released in LP format prior to this release: "Let Me", "Tell Me Why", the single (studio) versions of "Patch it Up" and "I've Lost You", the undubbed version of "Lover Doll". “Wild In The Country” had previously been released in the LP format on the UK configuration of “Elvis For Everyone”; this marked its first LP release in the US, however.

As a promotion, the initial release of this set included a small swath of fabric purported to come from Presley's outfits.

Professional ratings
Review scores
Source	Rating
Allmusic	link

== Track listing ==
Side one
No.	Title	Writer(s)	Recording date	Length
1.	"Puppet on a String" (from Girl Happy)	Roy Bennett, Sid Tepper	June 10, 1964	2:39
2.	"Witchcraft"	Dave Bartholomew and Pearl King	May 26, 1963	2:17
3.	"Trouble" (from King Creole)	Jerry Leiber, Mike Stoller	January 15, 1958	2:16
4.	"Poor Boy" (from Love Me Tender)	Vera Matson, Elvis Presley	August 24 & September 4, 1956	2:13
5.	"I Want to Be Free" (from Jailhouse Rock)	Jerry Leiber, Mike Stoller	May 3, 1957	2:12
6.	"Doncha' Think It's Time"	Luther Dixon, Clyde Otis	February 1, 1958	1:54
7.	"Young Dreams" (from King Creole)	Martin Kalmanoff and Aaron Schroeder	January 23, 1958	2:23

Side two
No.	Title	Writer(s)	Recording date	Length
1.	"The Next Step Is Love" (from Elvis: That's the Way It Is)	Paul Evans, Paul Parnes	June 7, 1970	3:31
2.	"You Don't Have to Say You Love Me" (from Elvis: That's the Way It Is)	Pino Donaggio, Simon Napier-Bell, Vito Pallavicini, Vicki Wickham	June 6, 1970	2:30
3.	"Paralyzed"	Otis Blackwell, Presley	September 2, 1956	2:23
4.	"My Wish Came True"	Ivory Joe Hunter	September 6, 1957	2:33
5.	"When My Blue Moon Turns to Gold Again"	Gene Sullivan, Wiley Walker	September 2, 1956	2:21
6.	"Lonesome Cowboy" (from Loving You)	Bennett, Tepper	January 15–18, 1957	3:01

Side three
No.	Title	Writer(s)	Recording date	Length
1.	"My Baby Left Me"	Arthur Crudup, Presley	January 30, 1956	2:11
2.	"It Hurts Me"	Joy Byers, Charles E. Daniels	January 12, 1964	2:27
3.	"I Need Your Love Tonight"	Bix Reichner, Sid Wayne	June 10, 1958	2:04
4.	"Tell Me Why"	Titus Turner	January 12, 1957	2:05
5.	"Please Don't Drag That String Around"	O. Blackwell, Winfield Scott	May 26, 1963	1:53
6.	"Young and Beautiful" (from Jailhouse Rock)	Schroeder, Abner Silver	April 30, 1957	2:02

Side Four
No.	Title	Writer(s)	Recording date	Length
1.	"Hot Dog" (from Loving You)	Jerry Leiber and Mike Stoller	January 15–18, 1957	1:12
2.	"New Orleans" (from King Creole)	Bennett, Tepper	January 15, 1958	1:58
3.	"We're Gonna Move" (from Love Me Tender)	Matson, Presley	August 24, 1956	2:30
4.	"Crawfish" (from King Creole)	Ben Weisman, Fred Wise	January 15, 1958	1:38
5.	"King Creole" (from King Creole)	Jerry Leiber and Mike Stoller	January 23, 1958	2:08
6.	"I Believe in the Man in the Sky"	Richard Howard	October 30, 1960	2:11
7.	"Dixieland Rock" (from King Creole)	Rachel Frank, Schroeder	January 16, 1958	1:46

Side five
No.	Title	Writer(s)	Recording date	Length
1.	"The Wonder of You" (live)	Baker Knight	February 18, 1970	2:34
2.	"They Remind Me Too Much of You"	Don Robertson, Leith Stevens	September 22, 1962	2:31
3.	"Mean Woman Blues" (from Loving You)	Claude Demetrius	January 13, 1957	2:15
4.	"Lonely Man" (from Wild in the Country)	Bennie Benjamin, Sol Marcus	November 7, 1960	2:43
5.	"Any Day Now"	Burt Bacharach, Bob Hilliard	February 20, 1969	2:58
6.	"Don't Ask Me Why" (from King Creole)	Weisman, Wise	January 16, 1958	2:06

Side six
No.	Title	Writer(s)	Recording date	Length
1.	"(Marie's the Name) His Latest Flame"	Doc Pomus, Mort Shuman	June 25, 1961	2:07
2.	"I Really Don't Want to Know"	Howard Barnes, Robertson	June 7, 1970	2:54
3.	"(You're So Square) Baby I Don't Care" (from Jailhouse Rock)	Jerry Leiber and Mike Stoller	May 3 & 8, 1957	1:51
4.	"I've Lost You" (single version)	Alan Blaikley, Ken Howard	June 4, 1970	3:30
5.	"Let Me" (from Love Me Tender)	Matson, Presley	September 4, 1956	2:08
6.	"Love Me"	Jerry Leiber and Mike Stoller	September 1, 1956	2:43

Side seven
No.	Title	Writer(s)	Recording date	Length
1.	"Got a Lot o' Livin' to Do!" (from Loving You)	Schroeder, Weisman	January 12, 1957	2:31
2.	"Fame and Fortune"	Weisman, Wise	March 20, 1960	2:29
3.	"Rip It Up"	Robert Blackwell, John Marascalco	September 3, 1956	1:53
4.	"There Goes My Everything"	Dallas Frazier	June 8, 1970	2:58
5.	"Lover Doll" (from King Creole)	Silver, Wayne	January 16, 1958	2:09
6.	"One Night"	Bartholomew, King, Anita Steiman	February 23, 1957	2:29

Side eight
No.	Title	Writer(s)	Recording date	Length
1.	"Just Tell Her Jim Said Hello"	Jerry Leiber and Mike Stoller	March 19, 1962	2:08
2.	"Ask Me"	Bernie Baum, Bill Giant, Florence Kaye, Domenico Modugno	January 12, 1964	2:05
3.	"Patch It Up" (single version)	Rory Michael Bourke, Eddie Rabbitt	August 11 & 12, 1970	3:08
4.	"As Long as I Have You" (from King Creole)	Weisman, Wise	January 16, 1958	1:50
5.	"You'll Think of Me"	Shuman	January 14, 1969	4:01
6.	"Wild in the Country" (from Wild in the Country)	Luigi Creatore, Hugo Peretti, George David Weiss	November 7, 1960	1:58
