= That's the Way It Is (Elvis Presley album) =

Studio album by Elvis Presley
- Released: November 11, 1970
- Recorded: June 5–7 & August 11–12, 1970
- Venue: International Hotel (Las Vegas)
- Studio: RCA Studio B (Nashville)
- Genres: Pop; country
- Length: 47:00
- Label: RCA Victor
- Producer: Felton Jarvis

Elvis Presley chronology
Almost in Love (1970)	That's the Way It Is (1970)	Elvis Country (I'm 10,000 Years Old) (1971)

Singles from That's the Way It Is
- 1. "I've Lost You" / "The Next Step Is Love" Released: July 14, 1970; 2. "You Don't Have to Say You Love Me" / "Patch It Up" Released: October 6, 1970; 3. "I Just Can't Help Believin'" Released: November 21, 1971

Professional ratings
Review scores
Source	Rating
AllMusic	4.5/5 stars
Christgau's Record Guide	C+
MusicHound	2.5/5
The Rolling Stone Album Guide	4/5 stars
Rough Guides	4/5 stars

That's the Way It Is is the twelfth studio album by American singer and musician Elvis Presley, released on RCA Records, LSP 4445, in November 1970. It consists of eight studio tracks recorded at RCA Studio B in Nashville, and four live in-concert tracks recorded at The International Hotel in Las Vegas. It accompanied the theatrical release of the documentary film Elvis: That's the Way It Is, although it is not generally considered a soundtrack album. The album peaked at number 21 on the Billboard 200 and at number eight on the country chart. It was certified Gold on June 28, 1973, by the Recording Industry Association of America and up-graded to Platinum, for sales of a million copies on March 8, 2018.

== Content ==
The original album consisted of eight tracks recorded at the RCA studio B in Nashville at the marathon sessions in June 1970 that also produced several singles and the Elvis Country album and four tracks from his August 1970 engagement at The International Hotel in Las Vegas. The track "You Don't Have to Say You Love Me" had been released as the advance single on October 6, 1970; its b-side, "Patch It Up", appears in a live version here. "The Next Step Is Love" had previously been released as a B-side in July 1970, and its A-side "I've Lost You" also appears in a live version. The concert version of "I Just Can't Help Believin'" from this album was released as a single in the United Kingdom in November 1971, reaching number six on the UK Singles Chart. Its b-side "How the Web Was Woven" was also taken from this album. A rehearsal version of the latter song was featured in the 1970 documentary Elvis: That's the Way It Is.

== Critical and commercial reception ==
Robert Christgau gave the album a C+ rating, writing that "his seventh album ... and third live LP [sic] of 1970 leans toward uptempo countryish ballads rather than the usual pop-rock eclecticism and proves that he can remember the words without cue cards. I know that's the way it is--but is it the way it has to be?"

Music historian John Robertson noted,

The authority of Presley's singing helped disguise the fact that the album stepped decisively away from the American-roots inspiration of the Memphis sessions towards a more middle-of-the-road sound. With country put on the back burner, and soul and R&B left in Memphis, what was left was very classy, very clean white pop—perfect for the Las Vegas crowd, but a definite retrograde step for Elvis.

Stephen Thomas Erlewine discusses the original album and several of its reissued versions, stating that:

"That's the Way It Is is arguably where Elvis Presley's discography gets very confusing. Sharing a title with Denis Sanders' 1970 documentary of Elvis' return to the stage, That's the Way It Is in its original 1970 LP incarnation isn't precisely a soundtrack to the film. In fact, only a third of the album captures Presley live on-stage in Vegas ... Vegas looms large over Elvis' legend in the '70s and many of the clichés -- the jumpsuits, the splashy arrangements of contemporary standards, the snazzy melodies of his old hits -- were born on That's the Way It Is, either on film or on the record. In its original LP incarnation, this wasn't especially apparent due to the record's reliance on the Nashville sessions, where Elvis recorded a fair share of perfectly pleasant middle-of-the-road material pitched halfway between Hollywood and Music City. These tunes -- "Twenty Days and Twenty Nights," "How the Web Was Woven," "Just Pretend," and "Stranger in the Crowd" ... -- these are the songs that don't appear in the live set. They may not have been part of Presley's repertoire but they do indicate how he was shifting away from the soulful, funky sound inspired by his 1968 comeback into something that felt showbiz. The live recordings, though, show that he was still performing with passion, figuring out what worked on-stage and what didn't after his long hiatus from performing. Again, this isn't so apparent on the 1970 LP, which was basically a good studio album that essayed Elvis' new persona for the coming decade, but all the various expanded editions (which include a 2000 special edition that adds a hefty dose of live material) capture the King starting to relax and enjoy his reign yet again. Certainly, the eight-disc set illustrates this in spades, and while it's undoubtedly one for the devoted, it nevertheless isn't overkill because it captures a peerless performer putting his amazing band through the paces. It's wonderful music that actually is more valuable now than it was at the time: Elvis would record more great music in the next few years, but this record -- especially in its 2014 expansion -- captures him at a pivotal moment, when he retained the power of his 1968 comeback and had yet to succumb to all the glitz of Vegas.

== Reissues ==
In 2009, the Follow That Dream label released The Wonder of You which contains the full concert from August 13, 1970. Some concert footage from that date was used in the documentary.

On July 6, 2012, Follow That Dream released a two-disc LP special edition of the album. This edition offers highlights from the 2-CD Follow That Dream release. It contains 21 tracks and features different takes of the songs.

== Track listing ==
=== Original release ===
Side one
No.	Title	Writer(s)	Recording date	Length
1.	"I Just Can't Help Believin"	Cynthia Weil, Barry Mann	August 11, 1970	4:34
2.	"Twenty Days and Twenty Nights"	Ben Weisman, Clive Westlake	June 4, 1970	3:15
3.	"How the Web Was Woven"	Clive Westlake, David Most	June 5, 1970	3:25
4.	"Patch It Up"	Eddie Rabbitt, Rory Bourke	August 12, 1970	4:03
5.	"Mary in the Morning"	Johnny Cymbal, Michael Rashkow	June 5, 1970	4:11
6.	"You Don't Have To Say You Love Me"	Vicki Wickham, Simon Napier-Bell, Pino Donaggio, Vito Pallavicini	June 6, 1970	2:30

Side two
No.	Title	Writer(s)	Recording date	Length
1.	"You've Lost That Lovin' Feelin'"	Barry Mann, Cynthia Weil, Phil Spector	August 12, 1970	4:23
2.	"I've Lost You"	Alan Blaikley, Ken Howard	August 11, 1970	3:43
3.	"Just Pretend"	Guy Fletcher, Doug Flett	June 6, 1970	4:02
4.	"Stranger in the Crowd"	Winfield Scott	June 5, 1970	3:47
5.	"The Next Step Is Love"	Paul Evans, Paul Parnes	June 7, 1970	3:31
6.	"Bridge Over Troubled Water"	Paul Simon	June 5, 1970	4:29

=== 2000 special edition ===
Disc one (Tracks 1–12 are from the original album)
No.	Title	Writer(s)	Recording date	Length
13.	"Love Letters"	Edward Heyman, Victor Young	June 7, 1970	2:52
14.	"When I'm Over You"	Shirl Milete	June 7, 1970	2:26
15.	"Something"	George Harrison	August 11, 1970	3:40
16.	"I'll Never Know"	Ben Weisman, Sid Wayne, Fred Karger	June 5, 1970	2:24
17.	"Sylvia"	Geoff Stephens, Les Reed	June 8, 1970	3:17
18.	"Cindy, Cindy"	Dolores Fuller, Buddy Kaye, Scott Weisman	June 4, 1970	2:31
19.	"Rags to Riches"	Richard Adler, Jerry Ross	September 22, 1970	1:54

Disc two
No.	Title	Writer(s)	Recording date	Length
1.	"That's All Right"	Arthur Crudup	August 12, 1970	2:32
2.	"Mystery Train" / "Tiger Man"	Herman Parker Jr., / Joe Hill Louis, and Sam Phillips (as Sam Burns)	August 12, 1970	3:42
3.	"Hound Dog"	Jerry Leiber, Mike Stoller	August 12, 1970	2:46
4.	"Love Me Tender"	Vera Matson, Elvis Presley	August 12, 1970	6:54
5.	"Just Pretend"	Guy Fletcher, Doug Flett	August 12, 1970	4:12
6.	"Walk a Mile in My Shoes"	Joe South	August 12, 1970	2:01
7.	"There Goes My Everything"	Dallas Frazier	August 12, 1970	4:10
8.	"Words"	Robin Gibb, Barry Gibb, Maurice Gibb	August 12, 1970	2:36
9.	"Sweet Caroline"	Neil Diamond	August 12, 1970	2:55
10.	"You've Lost That Lovin' Feelin'"	Barry Mann, Cynthia Weil, Phil Spector	August 12, 1970	6:29
11.	"Polk Salad Annie"	Tony Joe White	August 12, 1970	5:48
12.	"Heartbreak Hotel"	Mae Axton, Tommy Durden, Elvis Presley	August 12, 1970	1:45
13.	"One Night"	Dave Bartholomew, Pearl King, Anita Steiman	August 12, 1970	1:45
14.	"Blue Suede Shoes"	Carl Perkins	August 12, 1970	1:31
15.	"All Shook Up"	Otis Blackwell, Elvis Presley	August 12, 1970	2:00
16.	"Little Sister / Get Back"	Doc Pomus, Mort Shuman / John Lennon, Paul McCartney	August 12, 1970	3:32
17.	"I Was The One"	Aaron Schroeder, Hal Blair, Bill Peppers, Claude DeMetrius	August 12, 1970	1:11
18.	"Love Me"	Jerry Leiber, Mike Stoller	August 12, 1970	2:03
19.	"Are You Lonesome Tonight?"	Lou Handman, Roy Turk	August 12, 1970	1:58
20.	"Bridge Over Troubled Water"	Paul Simon	August 12, 1970	4:28
21.	"Suspicious Minds"	Mark James	August 12, 1970	6:05
22.	"Can't Help Falling In Love"	George Weiss, Hugo Peretti, Luigi Creatore	August 12, 1970	2:08

Disc three
No.	Title	Writer(s)	Recording date	Length
1.	"I Got A Woman"	Ray Charles, Renald Richard	August 13, 1970	3:15
2.	"I Can't Stop Loving You"	Don Gibson	August 10, 1970	2:50
3.	"Twenty Days and Twenty Nights"	Scott Weisman, Clive Westlake	August 12, 1970	4:02
4.	"The Next Step Is Love"	Paul Evans, Paul Parnes	August 10, 1970	3:31
5.	"You Don't Have to Say You Love Me"	Vicki Wickham, Simon Napier-Bell, Pino Donaggio, Vito Pallavicini	August 10, 1970	2:33
6.	"Stranger in the Crowd"	Winfield Scott	August 13, 1970	3:59
7.	"Make the World Go Away"	Hank Cochran	August 13, 1970	3:50
8.	"Don't Cry Daddy"	Mac Davis	August 13, 1970	2:32
9.	"In the Ghetto"	Mac Davis	August 13, 1970	2:42
10.	"Peter Gunn Theme" (instrumental)	Henry Mancini	July 15, 1970	1:02
11.	"That's All Right"	Arthur Crudup	July 15, 1970	2:34
12.	"Cottonfields"	Huddie Ledbetter	July 15, 1970	1:23
13.	"Yesterday"	Lennon–McCartney	July 15, 1970	2:45
14.	"I Can't Stop Loving You"	Don Gibson	July 15, 1970	2:26
15.	"Such A Night"	Lincoln Chase	July 29, 1970	1:39
16.	"It's Now or Never"	Eduardo di Capua, Aaron Schroeder, Wally Gold	July 29, 1970	2:16
17.	"(Now and Then There's) A Fool Such as I"	Bill Trader	July 29, 1970	2:45
18.	"Little Sister" / "Get Back"	Doc Pomus, Mort Shuman / John Lennon, Paul McCartney	July 29, 1970	6:05
19.	"I Washed My Hands In Muddy Water"	Joe Babcock	July 24, 1970	4:23
20.	"Johnny B. Goode"	Chuck Berry	July 24, 1970	3:04
21.	"Mary in the Morning"	Johnny Cymbal, Michael Rashkow	July 24, 1970	4:06
22.	"The Wonder Of You"	Baker Knight	July 24, 1970	3:16
23.	"Santa Claus Is Back In Town"	Jerry Leiber, Mike Stoller	August 4, 1970	2:02
24.	"Farther Along"	(traditional - public domain)	August 4, 1970	1:20
25.	"Oh Happy Day"	(traditional - public domain)	August 7, 1970	1:50

=== 2008 FTD 2-disc Special Edition ===
Disc one Tracks 1–12 are from the original album. The following are bonus tracks:
No.	Title	Writer(s)	Version	Length
13.	"Patch It Up"	Eddie Rabbitt, Rory Bourke	Studio Version	4:02
14.	"I've Lost You"	Ken Howard, Alan Blaikley	Studio Version	3:31
15.	"Twenty Days and Twenty Nights"	Scott Weisman, Clive Westlake	Take 8	3:17
16.	"Bridge Over Troubled Water"	Paul Simon	Live	4:14
17.	"Little Sister" / "Get Back"	Doc Pomus, Mort Shuman / John Lennon, Paul McCartney	Live	3:10
18.	"Something"	George Harrison	Live	3:37
19.	"The Next Step Is Love"	Paul Evans, Paul Parnes	Undubbed master	6:06
20.	"Patch It Up"	Eddie Rabbitt, Wade Jones	Take 1	5:17
21.	"Bridge Over Troubled Water"	Paul Simon	Alternate Mix	5:40

Disc two (outtakes)
No.	Title	Writer(s)	Version	Length
1.	"Tiger Man"	Lewis Burns, Al Lewis, Joe Hill Louis	Jam	2:49
2.	"Twenty Days and Twenty Nights"	Scott Weisman, Clive Westlake	Take 1, 2, 3	4:33
3.	"I've Lost You"	Ken Howard, Alan Blaikley	Take 1	5:25
4.	"Bridge Over Troubled Water"	Paul Simon	Take 1	5:01
5.	"You Don't Have to Say You Love Me"	Vicki Wickham, Simon Napier-Bell, Pino Donaggio, Vito Pallavicini	Rehearsal Composite	2:44
6.	"The Next Step Is Love"	Paul Evans, Paul Parnes	Take 2, 3, 6	5:11
7.	"How the Web Was Woven"	Clive Westlake, David Most	Take 1	4:55
8.	"Stranger in the Crowd"	Winfield Scott	Take 1, 3, 4, 5	4:52
9.	"Stranger in the Crowd"	Winfield Scott	Master Take 9 – Rough Mix	4:33
10.	"Mary in the Morning"	Johnny Cymbal, Michael Rashkow	Take 1, 2, 3, 4	7:45
11.	"Patch It Up"	Eddie Rabbitt, Rory Bourke	Take 2, 7	5:17
12.	"Patch It Up"	Eddie Rabbitt, Rory Bourke	Take 9 – Alternate master	3:16
13.	"You Don't Have to Say You Love Me"	Vicki Wickham, Simon Napier-Bell, Pino Donaggio, Vito Pallavicini	Take 1, 2	3:12
14.	"Just Pretend"	Guy Fletcher, Doug Flett	Take 1, 2	4:46
15.	"The Next Step Is Love"	Paul Evans, Paul Parnes	Take 7, 8, 9, 10	6:06
16.	"Bridge Over Troubled Waters"	Paul Simon	Take 2, 5	5:40
17.	"I've Lost You"	Ken Howard, Alan Blaikley	Take 4, 5, 6	5:22
18.	"Twenty Days and Twenty Nights"	Scott Weisman, Clive Westlake	Take 5, 6	2:18
19.	"Twenty Days and Twenty Nights"	Scott Weisman, Clive Westlake	Take 9 (Master) - Rough Mix	3:35

=== 2012 LP Special Edition ===
Side one
No.	Title	Writer(s)	Version	Length
1.	"I Just Can't Help Believin'"	Cynthia Weil, Barry Mann	MGM rehearsal	6:08
2.	"Twenty Days and Twenty Nights"	Scott Weisman, Clive Westlake	Take 8	3:16
3.	"Patch It Up"	Eddie Rabbitt, Rory Bourke	Live	3:49
4.	"Mary in the Morning"	Johnny Cymbal, Michael Rashkow	Take 4	4:16
5.	"You Don't Have to Say You Love Me"	Vicki Wickham, Simon Napier-Bell, Pino Donaggio, Vito Pallavicini	Take1,2	3:12

Side two
No.	Title	Writer(s)	Version	Length
1.	"You've Lost That Lovin' Feelin'"	Barry Mann, Cynthia Weil, Phil Spector	Stage rehearsal	4:18
2.	"I've Lost You"	Ken Howard, Alan Blaikley	Live	3:16
3.	"Stranger in the Crowd"	Winfield Scott	Master take 9, rough mix	4:31
4.	"The Next Step Is Love"	Paul Evans, Paul Parnes	Live	3:27
5.	"Bridge Over Troubled Water"	Paul Simon	Live	4:13

Side three
No.	Title	Writer(s)	Version	Length
1.	"Just Pretend"	Guy Fletcher, Doug Flett	Take 1, 2	4:46
2.	"How the Web Was Woven"	Clive Westlake, David Most	Master	3:25
3.	"Patch It Up"	Eddie Rabbitt, Rory Bourke	Alternate master take 9	3:14
4.	"Sweet Caroline"	Neil Diamond	Live	2:43
5.	"Make The World Go Away"	Hank Cochran	Live	3:21
6.	"The Wonder Of You"	Baker Knight	Live	2:39

Side four
No.	Title	Writer(s)	Version	Length
1.	"Little Sister" / "Get Back"	Doc Pomus, Mort Shuman / John Lennon, Paul McCartney	Live	3:09
2.	"Something"	George Harrison	Live	3:36
3.	"Patch It Up"	Eddie Rabbitt, Rory Bourke	Take 1	2:42
4.	"The Next Step Is Love"	Paul Evans, Paul Parnes	Take 9, 10	4:55
5.	"I've Lost You"	Ken Howard, Alan Blaikley	Take 4, 6	4:55

== Personnel ==
Sourced from Keith Flynn.

Studio tracks

- Elvis Presley – lead vocals, guitar, harmony vocals on "Bridge Over Troubled Water”
- James Burton – lead guitar
- Chip Young – rhythm guitar
- Charlie Hodge – harmony vocals, acoustic rhythm guitar
- David Briggs – piano; organ on "How the Web Was Woven"
- Norbert Putnam – bass
- Jerry Carrigan – drums
- Charlie McCoy – organ, harmonica, marimba on "Just Pretend", "Twenty Days and Twenty Nights", and "Bridge Over Troubled Water"
- Farrell Morris – percussion, vibes
- Weldon Myrick – steel guitar on "How the Web Was Woven"
- The Jordanaires – backing vocals
- The Imperials – backing vocals

Live tracks

- Elvis Presley – lead vocals, guitar
- James Burton – lead guitar
- John Wilkinson – rhythm guitar
- Charlie Hodge – harmony and backing vocals, acoustic rhythm guitar, scarves
- Glen Hardin – piano, electric piano
- Jerry Scheff – bass
- Ronnie Tutt – drums
- Millie Kirkham – backing vocals
- The Sweet Inspirations – backing vocals
- The Imperials – backing vocals
- The Joe Guercio Orchestra

== Charts ==
Chart (2000 Special Edition)	Peak position
Netherlands Top 100 Albums	87

== Certifications ==
Region	Certification	Certified units/sales
United Kingdom (BPI)	Gold	100,000^{‡}
United States (RIAA)	Platinum	1,000,000^{‡}
^{‡} Sales+streaming figures based on certification alone.
