= The Wonder of You (disambiguation) =

"The Wonder of You" is a song written by Baker Knight and recorded by several other artists, including Elvis Presley.

The Wonder of You may also refer to:

- The Wonder of You (The Sandpipers album), 1969
- The Wonder of You (Nelson Riddle album), 2000
- The Wonder of You (Elvis Presley album), 2016
- Wonder of U, a stand from JoJolion
