= The Wonder of You (Elvis Presley album) =

Compilation album by Elvis Presley with the Royal Philharmonic Orchestra
- Released: October 21, 2016
- Recorded: 2015–2016 Abbey Road Studios, London, England
- Genre: Orchestral pop; soul; rock
- Length: 51:22
- Label: RCA, Legacy
- Producer: Nick Patrick, Don Reedman (also exec.), Priscilla Presley (exec.)

Elvis Presley chronology
Las Vegas 1975 (2016)	The Wonder of You (2016)	A Boy from Tupelo: The Complete 1953–1955 Recordings (2017)

Singles from The Wonder of You
- 1. "A Big Hunk o' Love" Released: September 8, 2016; 2. "I've Got a Thing About You Baby" Released: September 30, 2016; 3. "Suspicious Minds" Released: October 7, 2016; 4. "The Wonder of You" Released: October 14, 2016

The Wonder of You is a compilation album by American singer Elvis Presley (1935–77). It was released on October 21, 2016, by RCA Records and Legacy Recordings. The album features archival vocal recordings of Elvis accompanied by new orchestral arrangements by the Royal Philharmonic Orchestra, recorded at the Abbey Road Studios. It also features a duet with German singer Helene Fischer.

It is the follow-up album to If I Can Dream (2015), which was a commercial success, selling 1.6 million copies worldwide. Elvis's ex-wife Priscilla Presley has said of The Wonder of You: "Elvis always loved the great, operatic vocalists. We often talked about his interest in recording material that allowed him to perform in that space. It's exciting to hear him on these recordings, performing with the world-class Royal Philharmonic Orchestra via the magic of Abbey Road Studios. He would have loved these performances and I'm very happy that we were able to make this dream come true for Elvis and his fans."

== Commercial performance ==
The album debuted at #1 on the UK Albums Chart earning a BPI Silver award in its debut week with sales of 63,500. The following 22 weeks, the last 4 non consecutively, it registered, inter alia, weekly sales of 35,456, 28,590, 29,647, 32,261, 44,446, 54,011, 60,979, 73,461, 35,915, 15,983, 9,575, 3,540, 1,900, 1,300 and 1,000, thus totalling sales of 505,000 units while landing at #2, #3, #5, #5, #3, #4, #4, #3, #3, #4, #7, #17, #32, #48, #61, #70, #96, #65, #58, #79 and #89 respectively, and earning a BPI Gold and Platinum certification. It is Elvis' 13th UK number-one album, making him the solo artist with most UK number-one albums (and overall only behind The Beatles with 15 number-one albums). Elvis also extended the record for most UK top 10 albums, with The Wonder of You becoming his 52nd top 10 album. It became the year's 5th top selling album, and the biggest seller by a US artist, the top four being Adele's 25, Coldplay's A Head Full of Dreams, Justin Bieber's Purpose, and Michael Ball and Alfie Boe's Together (three UK artists and a Canadian). Finally, it was also the #2 album released in the UK in 2016, after Together and by extension, the top selling album released in 2016 by a non-UK artist. In early 2018, it was announced that the album also made the list of the top 100 selling albums of 2017, at #84, with yearly sales of 84,000, thus totalling 542,250 units since its initial UK release back in 2016.

In the United States, the album debuted at #1 on the Billboard Classical Chart, making it Presley's second of three stays at the top on that chart, after If I Can Dream and before Christmas with Elvis and the RPO, the latter entering at #1 on the chart on 28 October 2017. It has thus far remained inside that chart's Top 20 for 25 weeks.

As of September 2017, the album had sold 800,000 copies worldwide according to Legacy Recordings.

== Track listing ==
The Wonder of You – Standard Edition
No.	Title	Writer(s)	Length
1.	"A Big Hunk o' Love"	Aaron Schroeder, Sidney Wyche	2:22
2.	"I've Got A Thing About You Baby"	Tony Joe White	2:35
3.	"Suspicious Minds"	Mark James	3:45
4.	"Don't"	Jerry Leiber and Mike Stoller	3:10
5.	"I Just Can't Help Believing"	Barry Mann, Cynthia Weil	4:35
6.	"Just Pretend"	Guy Fletcher, Doug Flett	4:06
7.	"Love Letters"	Edward Heyman, Victor Young	2:55
8.	"Amazing Grace"	John Newton	3:46
9.	"Starting Today"	Don Robertson	3:10
10.	"Kentucky Rain"	Eddie Rabbitt, Dick Heard	4:03
11.	"Memories"	Billy Strange, Mac Davis	3:15
12.	"Let It Be Me"	Gilbert Bécaud, Manny Curtis, Pierre Delanoë	3:26
13.	"Always On My Mind"	Wayne Carson, Johnny Christopher	3:39
14.	"The Wonder of You"	Baker Knight	2:31
15.	"Just Pretend" (duet with Helene Fischer) (bonus track)	Flett Fletcher	4:04
Total length:			51:22

The Wonder of You – Deluxe edition (bonus tracks)
No.	Title	Writer(s)	Length
15.	"You Don't Have to Say You Love Me"	Vicki Wickham, Simon Napier-Bell, Pino Donaggio, Vito Pallavicini	2:34
16.	"You Gave Me a Mountain"	Marty Robbins	3:15
17.	"Just Pretend" (duet with Helene Fischer)	Flett Fletcher	4:04
Total length:			56:11

Notes

- The duet version of "Just Pretend" with Helene Fischer is omitted from the UK version.
- The album was also released as a two-disc version with If I Can Dream.

== Charts ==
=== Weekly charts ===
Chart (2016)	Peak position
Australian Albums (ARIA)	3
Austrian Albums (Ö3 Austria)	7
Belgian Albums (Ultratop Flanders)	14
Belgian Albums (Ultratop Wallonia)	42
Canadian Albums (Billboard)	40
Dutch Albums (Album Top 100)	24
French Albums (SNEP)	4
German Albums (Offizielle Top 100)	11
Irish Albums (IRMA)	4
New Zealand Albums (RMNZ)	2
Norwegian Albums (VG-lista)	35
Scottish Albums (Official Charts)	2
Spanish Albums (PROMUSICAE)	49
Swiss Albums (Schweizer Hitparade)	11
UK Albums (Official Charts)	1
US Billboard 200	47
US Top Classical Albums (Billboard)	1

Chart (2025)	Peak position
Greek Albums (IFPI)	65

=== Year-end charts ===
Chart (2016)	Position
Australian Albums (ARIA)	31
Austrian Albums (Ö3 Austria)	53
Belgian Albums (Ultratop Flanders)	103
German Albums (Offizielle Top 100)	85
New Zealand Albums (RMNZ)	33
UK Albums (OCC)	5

Chart (2017)	Position
French Albums (SNEP)	165
UK Albums (OCC)	84
US Top Classical Albums (Billboard)	5

Chart (2018)	Position
US Top Classical Albums (Billboard)	26

== Certifications and sales ==
Region	Certification	Certified units/sales
Australia (ARIA)	Gold	35,000^{^}
Austria (IFPI Austria)	Gold	7,500^{*}
New Zealand (RMNZ)	Gold	7,500^{‡}
United Kingdom (BPI)	2× Platinum	600,000^{‡}
^{*} Sales figures based on certification alone.^{^} Shipments figures based on certification alone.^{‡} Sales+streaming figures based on certification alone.
