= List of Billboard Easy Listening number ones of 1970 =

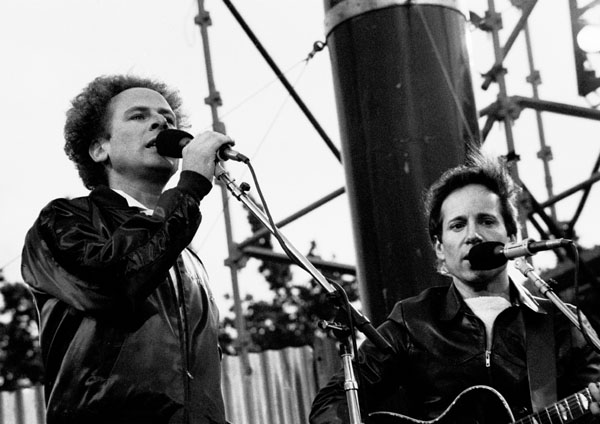
"Bridge over Troubled Water" was a chart-topper for Simon & Garfunkel.

In 1970, Billboard magazine published a chart ranking the top-performing songs in the United States in the easy listening market. The chart, which in 1970 was entitled Easy Listening, has undergone various name changes and has been published since 1996 under the title Adult Contemporary. In 1970, 16 songs topped the chart based on playlists submitted by easy listening radio stations and sales reports submitted by stores.

In the issue of Billboard dated January 3, the number one position was held by "Raindrops Keep Fallin' on My Head" by B. J. Thomas, which was in its third week in the top spot, and in the same week moved in the top spot on Billboard's pop chart, the Hot 100. It remained atop the Easy Listening chart for the first four weeks of the year before being replaced by "Without Love (There Is Nothing)" by the Welsh singer Tom Jones. Thomas and Jones returned to number one later in the year with "I Just Can't Help Believing" and "Daughter of Darkness", respectively, and were two of the four acts to achieve two Easy Listening number ones in 1970. Elvis Presley reached the top spot with both "The Wonder of You" and "You Don't Have to Say You Love Me" and the Carpenters had number ones with both "(They Long to Be) Close to You" and "We've Only Just Begun". The former song was the breakthrough release for the Carpenters, also topping the Hot 100 and launching a period of international stardom for the brother-sister duo. After spending six weeks in the top spot of the Easy Listening chart in July and August with "(They Long to Be) Close to You", the Carpenters spent a further seven weeks at number one in October and November with "We've Only Just Begun", the longest unbroken run of the year atop the chart. The duo's total of 13 weeks spent at number one was the most by any act in 1970.

In April, the Beatles achieved their first and only number one on the Easy Listening chart with "Let It Be". Although the British quartet had achieved huge success in the United States, spearheading the so-called British Invasion of the American market, few of their songs had been popular on easy listening radio; "Let it Be" was only their third song to appear on the chart. Within days of the song topping the chart, Paul McCartney announced his departure from the group, instigating a split which was complete by the end of the year, bringing to an end the career of a band widely regarded as the most successful and influential of all time. "Let It Be" also topped the Hot 100, as did "Bridge over Troubled Water" by Simon & Garfunkel and "Everything Is Beautiful" by Ray Stevens. The final Easy Listening number one of the year was "It's Impossible" by Perry Como, which held the top spot for the final four weeks of 1970.

== Chart history ==
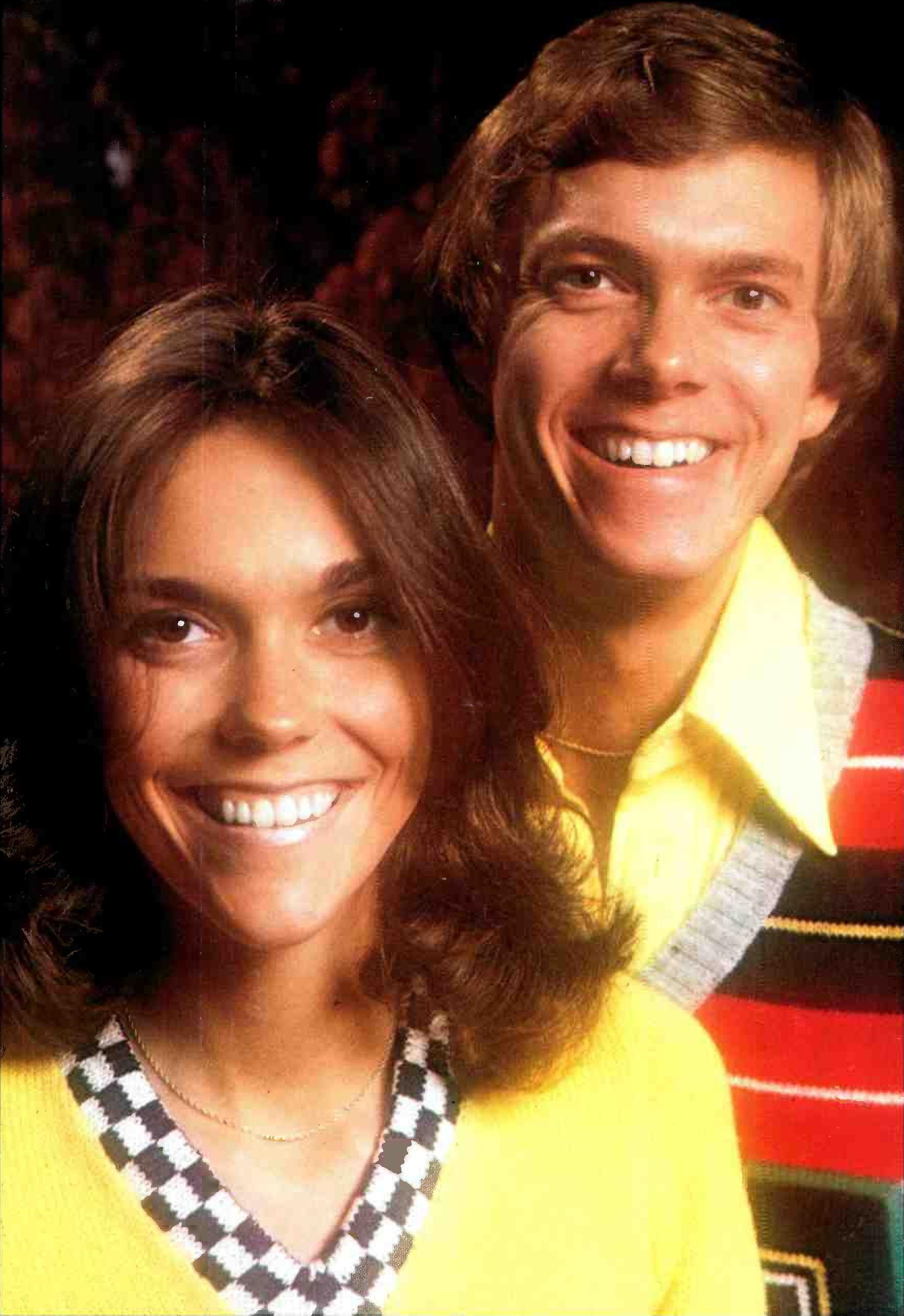
The Carpenters spent 13 weeks at number one, the most by any act.

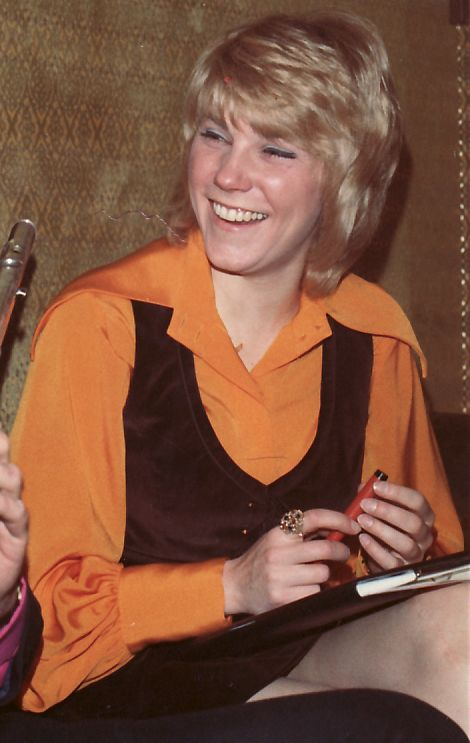
Canadian singer Anne Murray spent six weeks at number one with "Snowbird".

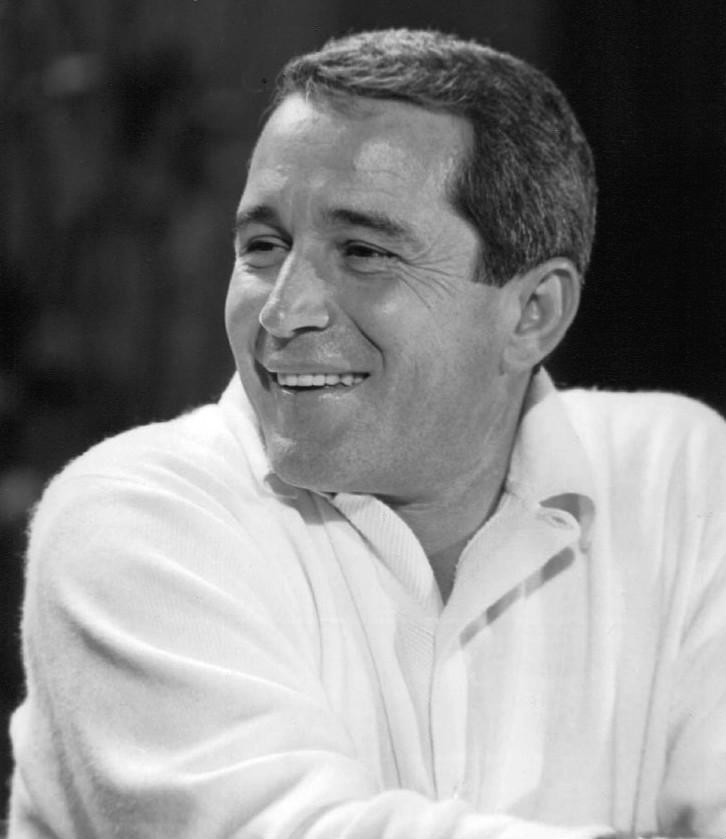
Perry Como had the year's final number one.

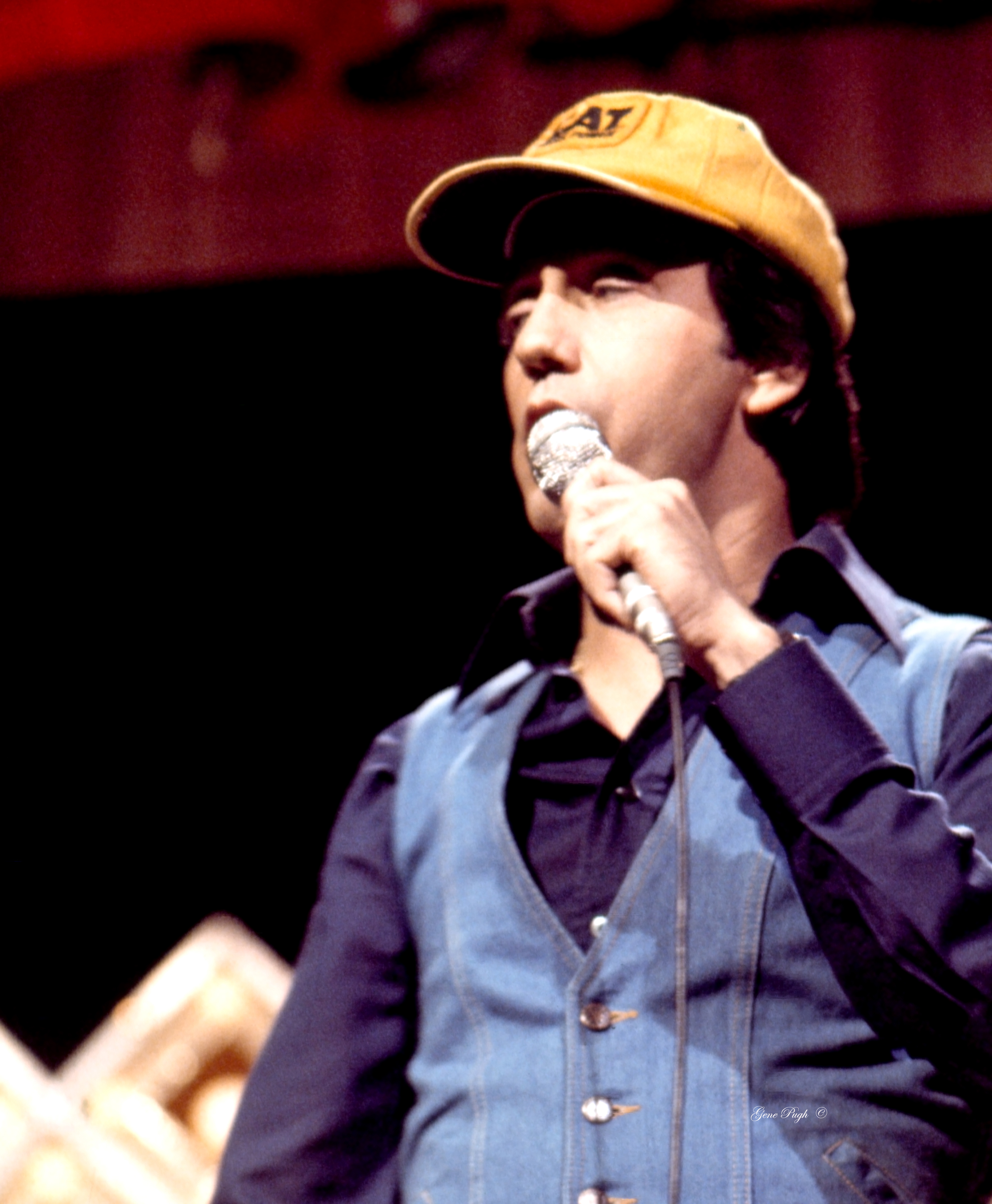
Ray Stevens topped both the easy listening and pop charts with "Everything Is Beautiful".

Key
†	Indicates number one on Billboard's year-end easy listening chart for 1970

Chart history
Issue date	Title	Artist(s)	Ref.
January 3	"Raindrops Keep Fallin' on My Head"	B. J. Thomas	
January 10	"Raindrops Keep Fallin' on My Head"	B. J. Thomas	
January 17	"Raindrops Keep Fallin' on My Head"	B. J. Thomas	
January 24	"Raindrops Keep Fallin' on My Head"	B. J. Thomas	
January 31	"Without Love (There Is Nothing)"	Tom Jones	
February 7	"I'll Never Fall in Love Again"	Dionne Warwick	
February 14	"I'll Never Fall in Love Again"	Dionne Warwick	
February 21	"I'll Never Fall in Love Again"	Dionne Warwick	
February 28	"Bridge over Troubled Water"	Simon & Garfunkel	
March 7	"Bridge over Troubled Water"	Simon & Garfunkel	
March 14	"Bridge over Troubled Water"	Simon & Garfunkel	
March 21	"Bridge over Troubled Water"	Simon & Garfunkel	
March 28	"Bridge over Troubled Water"	Simon & Garfunkel	
April 4	"Bridge over Troubled Water"	Simon & Garfunkel	
April 11	"Let It Be"	The Beatles	
April 18	"Let It Be"	The Beatles	
April 25	"Let It Be"	The Beatles	
May 2	"Let It Be"	The Beatles	
May 9	"For the Love of Him"	Bobbi Martin	
May 16	"For the Love of Him"	Bobbi Martin	
May 23	"Everything Is Beautiful"	Ray Stevens	
May 30	"Everything Is Beautiful"	Ray Stevens	
June 6	"Everything Is Beautiful"	Ray Stevens	
June 13	"Daughter of Darkness"	Tom Jones	
June 20	"The Wonder of You"	Elvis Presley	
June 27	"A Song of Joy"	Miguel Ríos	
July 4	"A Song of Joy"	Miguel Ríos	
July 11	"(They Long to Be) Close to You" †	The Carpenters	
July 18	"(They Long to Be) Close to You" †	The Carpenters	
July 25	"(They Long to Be) Close to You" †	The Carpenters	
August 1	"(They Long to Be) Close to You" †	The Carpenters	
August 8	"(They Long to Be) Close to You" †	The Carpenters	
August 15	"(They Long to Be) Close to You" †	The Carpenters	
August 22	"I Just Can't Help Believing"	B. J. Thomas	
August 29	"Snowbird"	Anne Murray	
September 5	"Snowbird"	Anne Murray	
September 12	"Snowbird"	Anne Murray	
September 19	"Snowbird"	Anne Murray	
September 26	"Snowbird"	Anne Murray	
October 3	"Snowbird"	Anne Murray	
October 10	"We've Only Just Begun"	The Carpenters	
October 17	"We've Only Just Begun"	The Carpenters	
October 24	"We've Only Just Begun"	The Carpenters	
October 31	"We've Only Just Begun"	The Carpenters	
November 7	"We've Only Just Begun"	The Carpenters	
November 14	"We've Only Just Begun"	The Carpenters	
November 21	"We've Only Just Begun"	The Carpenters	
November 28	"You Don't Have to Say You Love Me"	Elvis Presley	
December 5	"It's Impossible"	Perry Como	
December 12	"It's Impossible"	Perry Como	
December 19	"It's Impossible"	Perry Como	
December 26	"It's Impossible"	Perry Como	
