= Robert Abel (animator) =

American film director and animator

- Born: March 10, 1937; Cleveland, Ohio, U.S.
- Died: September 23, 2001 (aged 64); Los Angeles, California, U.S.
- Occupation: Film director

Robert Abel (March 10, 1937 – September 23, 2001) was an American pioneer in visual effects, computer animation and interactive media, best known for the work of his company, Robert Abel and Associates.

Born in Cleveland, he received degrees in Design and Film from UCLA. He began his work in computer graphics in the 1950s, as an apprentice to John Whitney.

In the 1960s and early 1970s, Abel wrote or directed several films, including The Making of the President, 1968, Elvis on Tour and Let the Good Times Roll.

In 1971, Abel and Con Pederson founded Robert Abel and Associates (RA&A), creating slit-scan effects and using motion-controlled cameras for television commercials and films. RA&A began using Evans & Sutherland computers to previsualize their effects; this led to the creation of the trailer for The Black Hole, and the development of their own software for digitally animating films (including Tron).

Abel and Associates was contracted to provide Paramount Pictures the special effects for Star Trek: The Motion Picture, but was not able to deliver them, and its services were terminated by Paramount.

In 1984, Robert Abel and Associates produced a commercial named Brilliance for the Canned Food Information Council for airing during the Super Bowl XIX telecast. It featured a sexy robot with reflective environment mapping and human-like motion.

Abel & Associates closed in 1987 following an ill-fated merger with now defunct Omnibus Computer Graphics, Inc., a company which had been based in Toronto.

In the 1990s, Abel founded Synapse Technologies, an early interactive media company, which produced pioneering educational projects for IBM, including "Columbus: Discovery, Encounter and Beyond" and "Evolution/Revolution: The World from 1890-1930".

He received numerous honors, including a Golden Globe Award (for Elvis on Tour), 2 Emmy Awards, and 33 Clios.

Abel died from complications following a heart attack at the age of 64.

Abel's film By the Sea, made with Pat O'Neill, was preserved by the Academy Film Archive in 2007.
