= Elvis: That's the Way It Is =

1970 film by Denis Sanders

- Theatrical release poster
- Directed by: Denis Sanders
- Starring: Elvis Presley
- Cinematography: Lucien Ballard
- Edited by: Henry Berman
- Distributed by: Metro-Goldwyn-Mayer
- Release dates: November 1970 (Toronto); November 11, 1970 (United States)
- Running time: 108 minutes
- Country: United States
- Language: English
- Box office: >$1 million

Elvis: That's the Way It Is is a 1970 American documentary film directed by Denis Sanders. The film documents American singer Elvis Presley's Summer Festival in Las Vegas during August 1970. It was his first non-dramatic film since the beginning of his film career in 1956, and the film gives a clear view of Presley's return to live performances after years of making films. The film was released simultaneously with Presley's similarly titled twelfth studio album, That's the Way It Is. It was followed up in 1972 with Elvis on Tour.

In 2001, Elvis: That's the Way It Is was reissued as a "special edition" with a different edit, unseen footage and alternate performances. The 2001 edit is shorter than the original but has greater emphasis on Presley's performances, and is the version most widely seen today. In 2025, more unseen footage from Elvis: That's the Way It Is was featured in a new documentary, EPiC: Elvis Presley in Concert.

== Overview ==
The original concept – as devised by technical advisor Colonel Tom Parker – was a closed circuit television presentation of one show, in view of Presley's triumphant return to live performances. The film was ultimately shot with eight Panavision cameras, in 35mm anamorphic format.

Although most of the footage takes place onstage at the International Hotel in Las Vegas, there are several other parts to the film:

- The opening credits sequence contains footage of Presley's show at Arizona Veterans Memorial Coliseum in Phoenix on September 9, 1970. This was the first show of Presley's first tour in 13 years.
- Presley and his band are seen rehearsing for the Las Vegas engagement at MGM Studios in Culver City, California. There are scenes of Presley running through such tunes as "I Just Can't Help Believing", "What'd I Say", "Little Sister", "Words", "That's All Right Mama", and "The Next Step Is Love." Presley and his group are also heard performing a tongue-in-cheek rendition of "Crying Time". The rehearsal sequences were filmed during late July 1970.
- Later rehearsals show Presley in Las Vegas with his back-up vocalists The Sweet Inspirations, Millie Kirkham and The Imperials, preparing songs such as "You Don't Have to Say You Love Me" and "Bridge Over Troubled Water".
- There is also a session of rehearsals that takes place in the Showroom Internationale of the International Hotel (now known as the Westgate Hotel and Casino) in Las Vegas. Together, Presley and the entire group run through songs from "Mary In the Morning" to "Polk Salad Annie". These rehearsals took place on August 7, 1970.
- Footage of an Elvis Appreciation Society convention in Luxembourg was shot on September 5, 1970. Radio Luxembourg DJs Tony Prince and Peter Aldersley are on hand to lead the festivities. A tandem bicycle owned by Presley is raffled off to a lucky fan in the audience. Additionally, various musicians are seen performing their own versions of Presley's songs.

=== Onstage in Las Vegas ===
The Elvis Summer Festival at the International Hotel began on August 10, 1970, and the MGM film crew was on hand to film this show as well as the evening and midnight performances of August 11, 12 and 13. He sings many well-known songs, including several of those that he had been seen rehearsing earlier in the film. The songs are:

- "Mystery Train"/"Tiger Man"
- "That's All Right Mama"
- "I've Lost You"
- "Love Me Tender"
- "In the Ghetto"
- "Patch It Up"
- "You've Lost That Lovin' Feelin'"
- "I Just Can't Help Believin'"
- "Sweet Caroline"
- "Heartbreak Hotel"
- "One Night"
- "Blue Suede Shoes"
- "All Shook Up"
- "Polk Salad Annie
- "Bridge Over Troubled Water"
- "Suspicious Minds"
- "Can't Help Falling in Love"
- "Don't Be Cruel"
- "You Don't Have to Say You Love Me"

Presley is also seen relaxing in his hotel suite with various members of his entourage. The movie is also intercut with footage of fans offering commentary about what Presley means to them; officials at the International Hotel; and celebrities (including Sammy Davis Jr., Cary Grant, Charo, George Hamilton, Juliet Prowse and Xavier Cugat) arriving for opening night of the show.

=== Shows/rehearsals ===
- July 14 rehearsal (M.G.M. Stage 1, Culver City, California)
- July 15 rehearsal (M.G.M. Stage 1, Culver City, California)
- July 24 rehearsal (R.C.A. studios, Hollywood, California)
- July 29 rehearsal (M.G.M. studios, Culver City, California)
- August 4 rehearsal (Convention Center, International Hotel, Las Vegas, Nevada)
- August 7 stage rehearsal
- August 10 stage rehearsal
- August 10 opening night show
- August 11 dinner show
- August 11 midnight show
- August 12 dinner show
- August 12 midnight show
- August 13 dinner show
- September 9 (Arizona Veterans Memorial Coliseum, Phoenix)

== Cast ==
- Elvis Presley
- The Imperials (vocals)
  - Terry Blackwood
  - Armond Morales
  - Joe Moscheo
  - Jim Murray
  - Roger Wiles
- The Sweet Inspirations (vocals)
  - Estell Brown
  - Myrna Smith
  - Sylvia Shemmell
  - Ann Williams
- TCB Band
  - Joe Guercio (orchestra conductor)
  - James Burton (lead guitar)
  - John Wilkinson (rhythm guitar)
  - Charlie Hodge (acoustic guitar and harmony vocals)
  - Glen D. Hardin (pianos)
  - Jerry Scheff (bass)
  - Ronnie Tutt (drums)
- Richard Davis
- Sammy Davis Jr.
- Joe Esposito
- Felton Jarvis
- Millie Kirkham (vocals)
- Red West
- Sonny West

== Reception ==
The film opened in the week ending November 11, 1970 at the Uptown I theater in Toronto, Canada grossing a mild $9,500 for the week. It expanded to at least nine cities the following week (including San Francisco, Portland, Denver and San Antonio) grossing $78,950 from the sample cities covered by Variety and placing 25th on their box office chart. Based on the sample cities covered by Variety, it grossed $332,714 from 110 play weeks in 1970. In Japan it grossed $700,000 in its first 6 weeks.

Gene Siskel of the Chicago Tribune described it as "a carefully managed […] concert designed to promote his future engagements in Nevada." He noted that "fans will be enthralled as Presley sings more than a dozen of his hits" but that "persons hoping to learn about the man after hours will be disappointed."

== 2001 version ==
In 2001, a new version of That's the Way it Is was compiled and produced by award-winning producer Rick Schmidlin. The new version eliminated much of the documentary and non-Elvis content of the original in favor of adding additional performances of Elvis rehearsing and in concert. The final film runs 12 minutes shorter than the original, but contains more music, although several performances included in the original film are omitted (most notably the concert performance of "I Just Can't Help Believin'", even though the new version of the film features footage of Presley rehearsing the song and being concerned about remembering its lyrics on stage).

The special edition was released on January 19, 2001, when this new version made its worldwide debut on the cable network, Turner Classic Movies, where it was the most watched film ever and seen by 95% of the audience. For this reason, the DVD version of the film did not sell well.

In August 2007, a two-disc DVD "special edition" was released by Warner/Turner that has both the reworked version plus the original cut. The original, however, has only a mono soundtrack (it was originally mixed in four-track stereo). The DVD also includes approximately 35 minutes of additional performances and other footage that was not included in either edition.

A two-disc Special Edition Premium Digibook was released on August 12, 2014. Estimated sales of the DVDs are well over 10 million.

== EPiC: Elvis Presley in Concert ==
While working on the 2022 biopic Elvis, director Baz Luhrmann unearthed previously unreleased footage of Presley including extensive outtakes from Elvis: That's the Way It Is as well as Elvis on Tour. This new material formed the basis of the 2025 documentary and concert film, EPiC: Elvis Presley in Concert. It premiered on September 5, 2025 at the Toronto International Film Festival.

== See also ==
- List of American films of 1970
- Elvis Presley on film and television
- Elvis Presley discography
