= Mike Rashkow =

American singer

Michael Rashkow
- Born: July 18, 1941
- Died: January 23, 2013 (aged 71)
- Occupation(s): Songwriter, record producer, business executive
- Known for: Co-writer of Mary in the Morning. Writer and producer for Dusty Springfield, The Daily News, The Definitive Rock Chorale, The Fuzzy Bunnies, The Whatnauts and The Other Voices as well as Ellie Greenwich.

Michael Rashkow (July 18, 1941 – January 23, 2013) was an American songwriter, record producer and the founder of an advertising agency called T:MC. He wrote "Mary in the Morning" with Johnny Cymbal. It was recorded by Elvis Presley, Glen Campbell, Al Martino, Dire Straits's Guy Fletcher, and many other artists. He formed Pineywood Productions with Ellie Greenwich in the late 1960s. Among the artists they wrote for and produced were Dusty Springfield, The Daily News, The Definitive Rock Chorale, The Fuzzy Bunnies, The Whatnauts and The Other Voices as well as Ellie Greenwich. Their publishing arm, Pineywood Music, published their own material and songs by other writers including Steve Tudanger and Paul Levinson, a member of The Other Voices.

== Early life ==
Michael Rashkow was born July 18, 1941, in New York City. As a child and young man, he grew up in New York and Florida, and he served in the U.S. Air Force as a psychiatric medic.

== Music career ==
Rashkow came to the music business without any background or credentials in the industry, having been a golf professional and a golf equipment manufacturer's rep from 1960 through 1965. His entree was via the recording studio and he became a recording engineer who worked at Bell Sound Studios, Studio 76, Sounds On Broadway, National Recording and Broadway Recording. His first songwriting partner was Mikie Harris (whom he later married), a noted NYC background singer of the 1960s who was later assistant to John Hammond. They signed as staff writers to Pamco Music, the BMI wing of ABC-Paramount Records, however they were not successful as a writing team.

=== "Mary in the Morning" ===
Rashkow began writing with his friend Johnny Cymbal, whom Rashkow had brought to ABC from Cymbal's previous staff position at South Mountain Music, the Don Costa/Teddy Randazzo firm. They soon wrote "Mary in the Morning", which became a worldwide hit. It has sold in excess of 10,000,000 recordings, and in 2010 attained BMI's Two Million Performance status for radio airplay. Rashkow and Cymbal wrote numerous other songs including "Julie On My Mind" which, as recorded by Adam Wade, became a hit in the Caribbean Islands and is today still well known among reggae enthusiasts.

During this period, under the name "Mike Lendell", Rashkow wrote, produced and sang lead on a novelty tune "Please Phil Spector" which was not released in the U.S., but received airplay overseas. That recording was subsequently included in a BBC documentary film about Phil Spector and more recently a tribute compilation CD titled Phil's Spectre on ACE Records. Contractual issues stalled the Cymbal/Rashkow writing partnership shortly thereafter, although in 1983 Cymbal and Rashkow reunited and wrote a number of songs for the Nashville market.

=== Partnership with Ellie Greenwich ===
In 1967, Rashkow formed Pineywood Productions and Pineywood Music with Ellie Greenwich. This was Rashkow's most productive period. In addition to the artists mentioned above, Rashkow and Greenwich signed Steve Tudanger as a writer and producer. Tudanger was a founder of the seminal doo-wop group The Four Evers and had been a voice in the Archies. As an artist, Tudanger had releases on Mercury Records and Wes Farrell's Chelsea label; though well-received, these were not successful. His song "Let Me Be Forever", as recorded by Steve Feldman, became a #1 hit in several South American countries. The Definitive Rock Chorale was a studio group and a vehicle for the Rashkow/Greenwich writing team, and utilized the vocal talents of NYC "A List" background and jingle singers, including Ron Dante, Toni Wine, Jimmy Radcliffe, Tony Passalaqua, Cashman, Pistilli and West and Ellie Greenwich herself. Their release "Variations On A Theme Called Hanky Panky" charted and became a minor cult classic. Rashkow and Greenwich also wrote and produced music for The Hardy Boys, an animated TV series.

== Other ventures ==
Alone, Rashkow produced the radio personality and author Jean Shepherd and film personality Jason Holliday in spoken-word/comedy format, as well as Jesse Henderson, a Newark-based soul artist.

Shortly thereafter, Rashkow left the music business and went into advertising as a copywriter and creative director. In 1981, he formed his own advertising/graphic design firm, Two Minute Communications (T:MC), specializing in marketing for the race horse industry.

Within two years, T:MC became universally recognized as the outstanding marketing agency of its type. During that period, they represented numerous major farms and equine syndication organizations in both the US and Canada.

Their work in that field led to other areas of commerce. Changing the agency name to Group T:MC as they expanded, Rashkow revised the focus of the firm and developed a broad range of business-to-business clientele. Among their clients during the next decade were AT&T, ABB, Community Bank of New Jersey, Merrill Lynch, Maser Engineering, Schoor/DePalma and Langeveld Bulb Company.

In 1985, Rashkow was among the founders of New Era Bank, Somerset, New Jersey. He was elected to the Board of Directors and continued on that Board until 1993 when the bank was sold. For five of those years, he served as Vice-Chairman of the Board and also directed the marketing for the bank's credit card division.

In 1998, Rashkow sold the advertising agency, and for the next four years he and his second wife, Barbara, became full-time RV-ers.

== Personal life ==
Michael Rashkow married Mikie Harris, his song writing partner in 1966 and had two children, Randy and Roger (Duke).

Rashkow died on January 23, 2013, at a hospice near his home, surrounded by family.
