= Elvis Presley – The Greensboro Concert 1972 =

promotional poster

Elvis Presley – The Greensboro Concert 1972 is a concert performance by Elvis Presley on April 14, 1972 in Greensboro Coliseum located in Greensboro, North Carolina. Footage from this show was used in the Golden Globe-winning Elvis on Tour 1972 movie. Elvis wore Blue Owl suit for this show.

== Track list ==
Elvis played the following tracks:

- A Space Odyssey
- See See Rider
- Proud Mary
- Never Been to Spain
- You Gave Me a Mountain
- Until It's Time for You to Go
- Polk Salad Annie
- Love Me
- All Shook Up
- Teddy Bear/Don't Be Cruel
- Hound Dog
- Heartbreak Hotel
- A Big Hunk O' Love
- Bridge Over Troubled Water
- Suspicious Minds
- Love Me Tender
- (band introductions)
- For the Good Times
- An American Trilogy
- Burning Love
- Release Me
- Funny How Time Slips Away
- Can't Help Falling In Love
