= For the Love of Him =

Single by Bobbi Martin

from the album For the Love of Him
- B-side: "I Think of You"; "I Fall to Pieces"
- Released: 1969
- Recorded: 1969
- Genre: Pop
- Label: United Artists
- Songwriters: Bobbi Martin, Henry Jerome
- Producer: Henry Jerome

Bobbi Martin singles chronology
"Harper Valley PTA" (1968)	"For the Love of Him" (1969)	"Give a Woman Love" (1970)

"For the Love of Him" is the title track from a 1969 album by Bobbi Martin who wrote the song with her producer Henry Jerome (who used the pseudonym Al Mortimer).

== Chart performance ==
The single was her most successful release on both the Pop and Easy Listening charts in the United States. It spent fourteen weeks on the Billboard Hot 100, debuting at number 93 the week of March 14, 1970 and peaking at number 13 the weeks of May 16 and 23, 1970. It also reached number 1 on the magazine's Easy Listening chart for two weeks in May 1970. "For The Love of Him" also afforded Martin a hit in Canada (number 9) and Australia (number 14).

Chart (1970)	Peak position
US Billboard Hot 100	13
US Billboard Easy Listening	1

== See also ==
- List of number-one adult contemporary singles of 1970 (U.S.)
