= Tiger Man (song) =

"Tiger Man (King of the Jungle)"

Single by Rufus Thomas, Jr.
- B-side: "Save That Money"
- Released: July 8, 1953
- Recorded: June 30, 1953
- Label: Sun
- Songwriters: Joe Hill Louis, Sam Phillips (as Sam Burns)

"Tiger Man (King of the Jungle)" is a song written by Joe Hill Louis and Sam Phillips (credited as Sam Burns). It was recorded for Sun Records by Rufus Thomas, Jr. in June 1953 and released as a single in July 1953.

The song was notably covered by Elvis Presley during his '68 Comeback Special. Another live version appeared in his 1970 concert film Elvis: That's the Way It Is and the accompanying album That's the Way It Is.

== History ==
Rufus Thomas recorded the song for Sun Records on June 30, 1953. On July 8, 1953, his recording was released as a single, with "Save That Money" on the opposite side.
