= Without Love (Clyde McPhatter song) =

"Without Love (There Is Nothing)"

Single by Ray Charles
- B-side: "No One"
- Released: June 1963
- Recorded: 1963
- Genre: Rhythm & blues
- Length: 3:33
- Label: ABC-Paramount
- Songwriter: Danny Small
- Producer: Sid Feller

Ray Charles singles chronology
"No One" (1963)	"Without Love (There Is Nothing)" (1963)	"Busted" (1963)

"Without Love (There Is Nothing)"

Single by Tom Jones

from the album Tom
- B-side: "The Man Who Knows Too Much"
- Released: December 1969
- Genre: Pop
- Length: 3:43
- Label: Parrot
- Songwriter: Danny Small

Tom Jones singles chronology
"Love Me Tonight" (1969)	"Without Love (There Is Nothing)" (1969)	"Daughter of Darkness" (1970)

"Without Love (There is Nothing)" is a song written by Danny Small and originally recorded by Clyde McPhatter in 1957. McPhatter's version peaked at number six on the R&B Best Seller chart and number nineteen on Billboard Hot 100.

== Later versions ==
Throughout the years the song has been recorded by a number of artists:

- In 1969, Tom Jones recorded the most successful charting version of the song, and it reached number five on the U.S. Hot 100 and number one on the Easy Listening chart in early 1970. In Canada, the single went to number one on the RPM 100 national Top Singles chart on Valentine's Day (February 14), 1970. On the New Zealand Listener charts it peaked at number 18.
- In 1978, this song was recorded by Filipino singer Sam Sorono on his Sings Tom Jones' Greatest Hits LP album with EMI Records.
- Ray Charles, Little Richard, Elvis Presley, Jerry Garcia, Jay and the Americans, and Oscar Toney Jr. have also recorded the song.

== See also ==
- List of RPM number-one singles of 1970
- List of Billboard Easy Listening number ones of 1970
