= Daughter of Darkness (song) =

Single by Tom Jones

from the album I Who Have Nothing
- B-side: "Tupelo Mississippi Flash"
- Released: April 1970
- Genre: Pop
- Label: Decca
- Songwriter(s): Les Reed, Geoff Stephens

Tom Jones singles chronology
"Without Love (There Is Nothing)" (1969)	"Daughter of Darkness" (1970)	"I (Who Have Nothing)" (1970)

"Daughter of Darkness" is a single by Tom Jones released in 1970 from his album, I Who Have Nothing. It was a top ten hit in the UK, peaking at No.5. In the United States and Canada, Jones just missed the top ten with "Daughter of Darkness", peaking at No.13 and No.11, respectively. The song went to No.1 in the United States on the Billboard Easy Listening chart in June 1970, and was Tom Jones' final of three number ones on the chart. Elton John, who was working as a session musician at that time, also sang on the recording.

== Chart history ==
=== Weekly charts ===
Chart (1970)	Peak position
Austria	15
Belgium	3
Canada RPM Top Singles	11
Germany	15
Ireland (IRMA)	3
Netherlands	16
New Zealand (Listener)	11
South Africa (Springbok)	1
UK Singles (OCC)	5
U.S. Billboard Hot 100	13
U.S. Billboard Easy Listening	1
U.S. Cash Box Top 100	10

=== Year-end charts ===
Chart (1970)	Rank
South Africa	9
UK	43
U.S. (Joel Whitburn's Pop Annual)	113
U.S. Cash Box	71

== See also ==
- List of number-one adult contemporary singles of 1970 (U.S.)
