= Mary in the Morning =

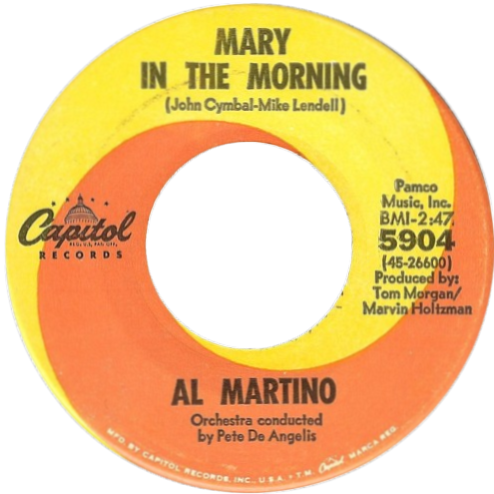

Single by Al Martino

from the album Mary in the Morning
- B-side: "I Love You and You Love Me"
- Released: May 1967
- Recorded: 1967
- Genre: Traditional pop
- Length: 2:47
- Label: Capitol
- Songwriters: John Cymbal; Mike Lendell
- Producers: Tom Morgan; Marvin Holtzman

Al Martino singles chronology
"Daddy's Little Girl" (1967)	"Mary in the Morning" (1967)	"More Than the Eye Can See" (1967)

"Mary in the Morning" is a song written by American songwriter and record producer Michael Rashkow and singer Johnny Cymbal.

== Background ==
It describes a man's intense love for his wife and how he looks forward to a lifetime with her.

== Recordings ==
"Mary in the Morning" was recorded by a number of artists:

- Al Martino had the most successful recording of the song, reaching number one on the Easy Listening chart for two weeks in July 1967 and number twenty-seven on the Billboard Hot 100, and number thirty-five on the Canadian RPM pop charts.
- Tommy Hunter reached the top of the Canadian RPM country charts with his version, which also charted on the lower end of the U.S. country charts.
- Glen Campbell recorded the song for his sixth album Gentle On My Mind, released in 1967.
- Ed Ames recorded the song for the ninth studio album of his solo singing career, When The Snow Is On The Roses, released in December of 1967.
- Elvis Presley is seen rehearsing the song in the 1970 film, Elvis: That's the Way It Is but it is not known if he ever performed it in his live act during the 1970s. A studio version appears on the soundtrack album [Label: RCA Victor – LSP-4445].
- Michael Kiske recorded the song for his third solo-album Kiske released in 2006

== See also ==
- List of number-one adult contemporary singles of 1967 (U.S.)
