= The Wonder of You (Nelson Riddle album) =

2000 compilation album of instrumentals by Nelson Riddle and his orchestra

Compilation album by Nelson Riddle and his orchestra
- Released: June 21, 2000
- Genre: Easy listening
- Label: Direct Source 5576 (cassette), 55762 (CD)

The Wonder of You was an album of instrumentals performed by Nelson Riddle and his orchestra, released on June 21, 2000, by Direct Source. The recording is a compilation of songs previously released on the 1982 album titled “The Look of Love”, with the exception of “Guantanamera,” which was included in the 1987 album titled “Games That Lovers Play.”

== Track listing ==
1. The Wonder of You (Baker Knight) 3:16
2. In the Arms of Love (Henry Mancini/Jay Livingston/Ray Evans) 2:19
3. Hey There Lonely Girl (Earl Shuman/Leon Carr) 3:13
4. Rainy Night in Georgia (Tony Joe White) 3:23
5. Guantanamera (Joseíto Fernández) 3:02
6. And When I Die (Laura Nyro) 2:16
7. Stay 2:11
8. The Look of Love (Burt Bacharach/Hal David) 2:41
9. My Elusive Dreams (Curly Putman/Billy Sherrill) 2:37
10. Can't Take My Eyes off You (Bob Crewe/Bob Gaudio) 3:04
