= Just Pretend (Elvis Presley song) =

Song by Elvis Presley

from the album That's the Way It Is
- Released: November 11, 1970 (on the album That's the Way It Is)
- Recorded: June 6, 1970
- Length: 4:02
- Label: RCA
- Songwriter(s): Guy Fletcher; Doug Flett

Music video
- Elvis Presley "Just Pretend" (With the Royal Philharmonic Orchestra) (official audio) on YouTube

"Just Pretend" is a 1970 song by Elvis Presley.

== Writing ==
It was composed by Guy Fletcher in partnership with his writing partner Doug Flett.

== Recording ==
Elvis Presley recorded it on June 6, 1970 as part of his July 4–8 studio sessions for RCA at RCA's Studio B in Nashville, Tennessee.

=== Personnel ===
- Elvis Presley – lead vocals, acoustic rhythm guitar
- James Burton – lead guitar
- Chip Young – rhythm guitar
- Charlie Hodge – acoustic rhythm guitar
- Norbert Putnam – bass
- David Briggs – piano
- Jerry Carrigan – drums
- Charlie McCoy – marimba

== Release history ==
The song was first released on Presley's album That's the Way It Is that appeared on November 11, 1970.

== Critical response ==
Robert Matthew-Walker in his 1995 book Heartbreak Hotel: The Life and Music of Elvis Presley calls the song "massive, slow and uninspired":

'Just Pretend' and 'Life' are similar: massive, slow and uninspired in both material and execution. These were recorded towards the end of the 6 June session; perhaps Presley was tired.

== 2016 version with the Royal Philharmonic Orchestra ==
In 2016, the song appeared on the album The Wonder of You: Elvis Presley with the Royal Philharmonic Orchestra, which included new versions of Presley's songs, reworked and dubbed with the Royal Philharmonic Orchestra. There were two versions of the song: Presley's solo version and a (‘virtual’) duet with Helene Fischer.
