= Bobbi Martin =

American musician

- Martin on the For The Love Of Him album cover

Background information
- Born: Barbara Ann Martin; November 29, 1938; Brooklyn, New York City, U.S.
- Died: May 2, 2000 (aged 61) Baltimore, Maryland, U.S.
- Genres: Pop, Country, Adult Contemporary, Easy Listening
- Occupation: Singer
- Instruments: Vocals, guitar
- Years active: 1960s–1990s
- Labels: Coral Records, United Artists Records, Buddah Records

Barbara Ann "Bobbi" Martin (November 29, 1938 – May 2, 2000) was an American country and pop music singer, songwriter, and guitarist. She was raised and began her singing career in Baltimore, working her way up from local venues onto the national nightclub circuit.

Martin was born to Virginia Chaney (1919-1971) and an unknown father. Her mother refused to tell her the name of her birth father, something that haunted Bobbi her entire life. When Martin was 5, her mother married Allen C. Paulson (1920-1983) in Temple, Texas, whom she met while they were both in the military, and the family lived in his hometown of Oslo, Minnesota, on the North Dakota border. Bobbi had a half-brother, Terry Paulson, born in 1946. Bobbi represented her stage age as her birth year 1943.

Martin recorded for Coral Records for several years before releasing her debut album, Don't Forget I Still Love You. The title track was a hit in the U.S., peaking at No. 2 on the Easy Listening (adult contemporary) chart and No. 19 on the Billboard Hot 100. A follow-up single "I Can't Stop Thinking of You", first introduced on the nationally televised Dean Martin Show won her the Cashbox Disc Jockey Poll as Most Promising Female Vocalist of 1965. While popular at nightclubs in Miami Beach, New York, Las Vegas and Puerto Rico, and on TV appearances with the Jackie Gleason, Ronnie Dove, Tonight, and Dean Martin Shows, it would be 5 years before she scored another hit with "For the Love of Him", from the album of the same name. This song went to No. 1 on the Adult Contemporary chart and No. 13 on the Hot 100. The singer charted many smaller regional, Bubbling Under Hot 100 and Easy Listening chart records up to 1972.

Martin died of cancer on May 2, 2000 at the Brighton Wood Knoll medical facility in Baltimore. Martin had one daughter, Shane Clements.

== Discography ==
- Don't Forget I Still Love You (Coral Records, 1964) U.S. No. 127
- I Love You So (Coral Records, 1965)
- Harper Valley P.T.A. (United Artists UAS 6668, 1968)
- For the Love of Him (United Artists UAS 6700, 1969) No. 45 Country
- With Love (United Artists UAS 6755, 1970) U.S. No. 176
- Have You Ever Been Lonely (Vocalion VL 73906, Compilation, 1970)
- Tomorrow (Buddah Records, 1971)
- Thinking of You (Sunset, SUS-5319, 1971)

=== Singles ===
Year	Single (A-side, B-side) Both sides from same album except where indicated	Chart positions				Album
Year	Single (A-side, B-side) Both sides from same album except where indicated	US	US AC	US Country	AUS	Album
1960	"Is It True?" b/w "(Ay, Ay, Ay) I'll Wait Forever"	—	—	—	—	Non-album tracks
1961	"I Need Your Love" b/w "Cry, Cry, Cry"	—	—	—	—	Non-album tracks
1961	"(You Don't Have a) Wooden Heart" b/w "Why Should I Cry"	—	—	—	—	Non-album tracks
1962	"Forgive Me" b/w "Tired and Blue"	—	—	—	—	Non-album tracks
1962	"Afraid" b/w "Brenda, Brenda"	—	—	—	—	Non-album tracks
1963	"A - You're Adorable (Alphabet Of Love)" b/w "A Girl's Prayer"	—	—	—	—	Non-album tracks
1964	"Does Your Heart Hurt A Little" b/w "I'm A Fool (To Go On Loving You)" (from Don't Forget I Still Love You)	—	—	—	—	Non-album tracks
1964	"Don't Forget I Still Love You" b/w "On The Outside (Looking In)" (Non-album track)	19	2	—	—	Don't Forget I Still Love You
1965	"I Can't Stop Thinking Of You" b/w "A Million Thanks To You" (from Don't Forget I Still Love You)	46	9	—	—	I Love You So
1965	"I Love You So" b/w "When Will The Torch Go Out" (Non-album track)	70	16	—	—	I Love You So
1965	"I Don't Want To Live (Without Your Love)" b/w "Holding Back The Tears"	115	21	—	—	Non-album tracks
1965	"There Are No Rules" b/w "Auf Wiedersehen, Goodbye"	—	29	—	—	Non-album tracks
1965	"Just One Time" b/w "Tryin' To Get You Offa' My Mind"	—	—	—	—	Non-album tracks
1966	"Don't Take It Out On Me" b/w "Something On My Mind"	119	—	—	—	Non-album tracks
1966	"Sometimes" b/w "I Can Give You Love"	—	—	—	—	Non-album tracks
1966	"Oh Lonesome Me" b/w "It's a Sin to Tell a Lie"	134	—	64	—	Non-album tracks
1966	"Just as Much as Ever" b/w "You Have No Idea"	—	—	—	—	Non-album tracks
1967	"How Long" b/w "Anytime" (from Don't Forget I Still Love You)	—	—	—	—	Non-album tracks
1968	"Only You (and You Alone)" b/w "Would You Believe"	—	—	—	—	Non-album tracks
1968	"A Man and A Woman" b/w "Before You"	—	—	—	—	Non-album tracks
1968	"Harper Valley P.T.A." b/w "He Called Me Baby"	114	—	—	—	Harper Valley P.T.A
1968	"I Love Him" b/w "I Think Of You"	—	—	—	—	Harper Valley P.T.A
1969	"Your Cheatin' Heart" b/w "Tennessee Waltz"	—	—	—	—	For The Love Of Him
1970	"For The Love Of Him"; Original A-side: "I Fall to Pieces"; Later B-side: "I Think Of You" (from Harper Valley P.T.A.)	13	1	—	14	For The Love Of Him
1970	"Give A Woman Love" b/w "Goin' South"	97	17	—	89	With Love
1971	"No Love at All" (cover) b/w "A Place For Me"	123	—	—	—	Tomorrow
1971	"Devotion" b/w "A Place For Me" (from Tomorrow)	—	—	—	—	Non-album track
1971	"Tomorrow" b/w "Sentimental Journey"	—	32	—	—	Tomorrow
1972	"Something Tells Me (Something's Gonna Happen Tonight)" b/w "Give Me A Star/To Live Another Summer To Pass Another Winter"	—	16	—	—	Non-album tracks
1973	"Now Lonely Is Only A Word" b/w "Smile For Me"	—	—	—	—	Non-album tracks
1975	"Man Was Made To Love Woman" b/w "Don't Be Down On Me"	—	—	—	—	Non-album tracks
