= Stranger in the Crowd =

"Stranger in the Crowd" is a song written for Elvis Presley by Winfield Scott for Elvis' 1970 album That's The Way It Is. Scott had previously co-written with Otis Blackwell a number of other songs for Presley, including the hits "Return to Sender" and others. The song features an extended guitar solo by lead guitarist James Burton. A live version was released on disc three of the special edition version of the aforementioned album. The video of this recording is contained on disc two of That's the Way It Is special features.
