= Doug Flett =

Australian songwriter (1935–2019)

- Born: Douglas Jackson Flett; 13 October 1935; Australia
- Origin: London, England
- Died: 15 July 2019 (aged 83)
- Genre: Pop
- Occupation: Songwriter
- Years active: 1965–2019

Douglas Jackson Flett (13 October 1935 – 15 July 2019) was an Australian-British songwriter based in the UK, best known for his collaborations with longtime songwriting partner, Guy Fletcher. Collectively, the duo have also been known as Fletcher & Flett. Since the mid-1960s, they wrote and composed hit songs for many artists.

== Career ==
Before moving to London in the early 1960s, Flett had worked in Sydney as a TV cameraman and in advertising. While in London, he was introduced to Guy Fletcher in 1965 by Shadows drummer Tony Meehan through a phone call, and the two met up. Since then, the duo wrote many songs for a wide number of artists including Elvis Presley, Ray Charles, Cliff Richard and Frankie Valli.

Flett and Fletcher's song "Save Me" (originally recorded by Merrilee Rush in 1977) was later covered by several other artists:

- Brian Chapman - 1977
- Clodagh Rogers - 1977
- Donna McDaniel - 1977
- Clout - 1978
- Mary Wilson of The Supremes - 1980
- Louise Mandrell - 1983

In 2016, they were each awarded a Gold Disc for their song "Just Pretend" due to sales of the Elvis Presley & Royal Philharmonic Orchestra compilation album The Wonder of You; the song features twice on the album, including a duet version with Helene Fischer.

== Death ==
It was announced that Flett had died on 15 July 2019 after a long illness. He was survived by his daughter, journalist and broadcaster Kathryn Flett.
