= Patch It Up =

Single by Elvis Presley

from the album That's the Way It Is
- A-side: "You Don't Have to Say You Love Me"
- Released: October 6, 1970
- Recorded: June 8, 1970
- Studio: RCA's Studio B Nashville
- Genre: Rock
- Length: 3:09
- Label: RCA Victor
- Songwriters: Eddie Rabbitt; Rory Bourke

Elvis Presley singles chronology
| "I've Lost You" / "The Next Step Is Love" (1970) | "You Don't Have to Say You Love Me" / "Patch It Up" (1970) | "I Really Don't Want to Know" / "There Goes My Everything" (1970) |

"Patch It Up" is a song written by Eddie Rabbitt and Rory Bourke and originally recorded by Elvis Presley. He released it as a single, with "You Don't Have to Say You Love Me" on the opposite side, in October 1970.

A live version of the song recorded on August 12, 1970, was featured in the concert film Elvis: That's the Way It Is and the accompanying album That's the Way It Is was released a month later, in November.

"Patch It Up" reached number 11 on the Billboard Hot 100 (as a double A-side with "You Don't Have to Say You Love Me").

== Composition ==
The song was written by Eddie Rabbitt and Rory Bourke.

== Recordings ==
Elvis originally recorded the song during his "marathon" June 1970 sessions at RCA's Studio B in Nashville. That version was released as a single with "You Don't Have to Say You Love Me" on October 6.

In August 1970, Presley performed this song during his so-called "Elvis Summer Festival" at the International Hotel in Las Vegas. The concerts were documented in the MGM theatrical documentary film Elvis: That's the Way It Is and its accompanying soundtrack album That's the Way It Is released in November. The recording used for the album was from the August 12, 1970, dinner show.

== Track listing ==
7" single (, )
| No. | Title | Writer(s) | Length |
|---|---|---|---|
| 1. | "You Don't Have to Say You Love Me" | Vicki Wickham, Simon Napier-Bell, Pino Donaggio, Vito Pallavicini | 2:29 |
| 2. | "Patch It Up" | Eddie Rabbitt, Rory Bourke | 3:09 |

== Charts ==
| Chart (1970) | Peak position |
|---|---|
| US Billboard Hot 100 | 11 |
