= I've Lost You =

Single by Elvis Presley

from the album That's the Way It Is
- B-side: "The Next Step Is Love"
- Released: July 14, 1970
- Genre: Soft rock
- Length: 3:31
- Label: RCA Victor
- Songwriters: Ken Howard; Alan Blaikley

Elvis Presley singles chronology
"The Wonder of You" / "Mama Liked the Roses" (1970)	"I've Lost You" / "The Next Step Is Love" (1970)	"You Don't Have to Say You Love Me" / "Patch It Up" (1970)

Audio
- “I've Lost You" on YouTube

"I've Lost You" is a song written by Alan Blaikley and Ken Howard (under the pen name 'Steve Barlby') for Iain Matthews. It was originally recorded by Mathews in 1969 and released on his first solo album after leaving Fairport Convention: Matthews' Southern Comfort.

== Elvis Presley recording ==
"I've Lost You" was covered by Elvis Presley. It was released in July 1970, debuted at number 85 on the Hot 100 on 1 August 1970, and reached number 32 on 29 August – 5 September 1970. On the Cash Box chart, however, it reached as high as number 18. It also charted at number five on the Adult Contemporary chart. The song became a gold record.

As a newly released single, Presley included it in his setlist during his third Las Vegas season (August/September 1970) and the version from 12 August Dinner Show was included in the MGM movie Elvis: That's the Way It Is.

In Canada, "I've Lost You" was a Top 10 hit. It peaked at number 10, and spent two weeks in that position. It was also a top 10 hit in the United Kingdom where Presley's career was on something of a major resurgence, reaching number 9 for two weeks in November and December.

The song might be seen as reflecting the state of Elvis' marriage to Priscilla at the time it was recorded (4 June 1970).

=== Chart performance ===
Chart (1970)	Peak position
Australia	6
Belgium	9
Canada RPM Top Singles	10
Germany	40
Ireland (IRMA)	15
Netherlands	15
UK Singles Chart	9
US Billboard Hot 100	32
US Billboard Easy Listening	5
US Billboard Country Singles	57
US Cash Box Top 100	18
