= Johnny Cymbal =

American musician

- Also known as: Brother John; Derek
- Born: John Hendry Blair; February 3, 1945; Ochiltree, East Ayrshire, Scotland
- Died: March 16, 1993 (aged 48) Nashville, Tennessee, U.S.
- Genre: Pop
- Occupations: Singer; songwriter; record producer
- Instrument: Vocals
- Years active: 1960–1993
- Labels: MGM; Capitol; Kapp; DCP; Chelsea; Columbia; Amaret

Johnny Cymbal (born John Hendry Blair; February 3, 1945 – March 16, 1993) was a Scottish-American songwriter, singer and record producer who had numerous hit records, including his signature song, "Mr. Bass Man". During a 33-year career, Cymbal made an impact on popular music worldwide. During those years, in addition to his rock and roll anthem, "Mr. Bass Man", he was responsible for hit records including "Teenage Heaven", "Cinnamon" (Under the pseudonym "Derek"), "Mary in the Morning", "Rock Me Baby" and "I'm Drinking Canada Dry".

== Overview ==
He was born in Ochiltree, East Ayrshire, Scotland, but his family relocated to Canada when Cymbal was a child. Later residing in Cleveland, Ohio, Cymbal got a recording contract with MGM Records in 1960. Three years later he had switched to Kapp Records and with the hit "Mr. Bass Man", Cymbal was recognized as a teen star. The "Bass Man" part was sung uncredited by Ronnie Bright (1938–2015), who sang with the Cadillacs, the Valentines and, for 40 years, phase two of the Coasters. In 1973, Who bassist John Entwistle covered the song on his third solo album, Rigor Mortis Sets In.

In New York state, Cymbal wrote and produced records for a number of artists, including Gene Pitney and Terri Gibbs (who had a country crossover hit with "Somebody's Knockin'"). In early 1969, as the New York recording scene slowed dramatically, Cymbal and his writing/producing partner George Tobin moved their base to California. Initially, Austin Roberts, who was a singer as well as a writer, stayed in New York, but soon after they had settled into the West Coast, he joined them in Los Angeles. With the entrepreneurial Tobin running the business and Cymbal and Roberts creating the music, they were making what Roberts describes as "the record of the day" — they would write a song during the day, then go into the studio to record it that night — with either Cymbal and/or Roberts singing it. The next day, according to Roberts, "Tobin would go sell it to three different labels." That may be an exaggeration, but they certainly made a lot of music recording under names such as "Taurus" on Tower and "Brother John" on A&M.

== Death ==
Cymbal died of a heart attack on March 16, 1993, at the age of 48.

== Discography ==
=== Albums ===
- Mr. Bass Man (1963)
- Cymbal and Clinger (with Peggy Clinger) (1972)

=== Singles ===
Year	Single	Peak chart positions					
Year	Single	AUS	CAN	NZ	UK	US	US AC
1960	"It'll Be Me"	—	—	—	—	—	—
1960	"The Water Was Red"	—	—	—	—	—	—
1963	"Mr. Bass Man"	13	31	—	24	16	—
1963	"Bachelor Man"	—	—	—	—	—	—
1963	"Teenage Heaven"	80	—	—	—	58	19
1963	"Dum Dum Dee Dum"	83	—	—	—	77	—
1963	"Hurdy Gurdy Man"	—	—	—	—	—	—
1964	"There Goes a Bad Girl"	—	—	—	—	—	—
1964	"Mitsu"	—	—	—	—	—	—
1964	"Surfin' at Tia Juana" (Japan-only release)	—	—	—	—	—	—
1964	"Pack of Lies (Ashita-Ga-Arusa)" (Japan-only release)	—	—	—	—	—	—
1964	"Little Miss Lonely" (as 'Johnny (Mr. Bassman) Cymbal')	—	—	—	—	—	—
1964	"Cheat, Cheat"	—	—	—	—	—	—
1965	"Go V.W. Go"	—	—	—	—	—	—
1965	"Summertime's Here at Last"	—	—	—	—	—	—
1966	"Jessica"	—	—	—	—	—	—
1967	"Carol Cartoon" (with Paul Drefuss, as 'The Eye-Full Tower')	—	—	—	—	—	—
1967	"It Looks Like Love"	—	—	—	—	—	—
1967	"The Marriage of Charlotte Brown"	—	—	—	—	—	—
1968	"Cinnamon" (as 'Derek')	10	1 (Note: "Cinnamon" also peaked at number 3 on the Canadian RPM chart.)	10	—	11	—
1968	"Angela Jones" (as 'Milk')	—	—	—	—	—	—
1969	"Snowball" (as 'American Machine')	—	—	—	—	—	—
1969	"Back Door Man" (as 'Derek')	—	—	—	—	59	—
1969	"Mr. Bass Man" (re-release)	—	—	—	—	—	—
1969	"Big River"	—	—	—	—	—	—
1969	"Bless You" (as 'Taurus')	—	—	—	—	—	—
1969	"Save All Your Lovin' (Hold It for Me)"	—	—	—	—	—	—
1969	"Inside Out - Outside In" (as 'Derek')	—	—	—	—	—	—
1970	"Polyanna" (as 'Brother John')	84	—	—	—	—	—
1971	"The Mookie Mookie Man" (with Peggy Clinger)	—	—	—	—	—	—
1972	"God Bless You Rock n' Roll" (with Peggy Clinger)	—	—	—	—	—	—
1973	"The Dying River" (with Peggy Clinger)	—	—	—	—	—	—
1973	"Mr. Bass Man" (2nd re-release)	—	—	—	—	—	—
1973	"Cinnamon" (re-release)	—	—	—	—	—	—
1973	"Boulder, Colorado" (promo-only release)	—	—	—	—	—	—
1990	"Cinnamon" (2nd re-release)	—	—	—	—	—	—
2001	"A Pack of Lies (Ashita Ga Arusa)" (Japan-only re-release)	—	—	—	—	—	—
"—" denotes releases that did not chart or were not released
