= The Next Step Is Love =

Single by Elvis Presley

from the album That's the Way It Is
- A-side: "I've Lost You"
- Released: July 14, 1970
- Genre: Soft rock
- Length: 3:30
- Label: RCA Victor
- Songwriter(s): Paul Evans; Paul Parnes

Elvis Presley singles chronology
"The Wonder of You" / "Mama Liked the Roses" (1970)	"I've Lost You" / "The Next Step Is Love" (1970)	"You Don't Have to Say You Love Me" / "Patch It Up" (1970)

"The Next Step Is Love" is a song written by Paul Evans and Paul Parnes and originally recorded by Elvis Presley.

Released as a single, it reached number 32 on the Billboard Hot 100 as a double A-side with "I've Lost You".

The song was included on the album That's the Way It Is, released in November 1970.

== Track listing ==
7" single (, )
No.	Title	Writer(s)	Length
1.	"I've Lost You"	Alan Blaikley, Ken Howard	3:31
2.	"The Next Step Is Love"	Paul Evans, Paul Parnes	3:30

== Charts ==
Chart (1970)	Peak position
US Billboard Hot 100	32
US Hot Country Songs (Billboard)	57
