= I Just Can't Help Believing =

1970 single by B.J. Thomas

Single by B. J. Thomas

from the album Everybody's Out of Town
- B-side: "Send My Picture to Scranton, PA."
- Released: June 1970
- Genre: Easy listening
- Length: 2:57
- Label: Scepter Records
- Songwriters: Barry Mann; Cynthia Weil
- Producer: Chips Moman

B. J. Thomas singles chronology
"Everybody's Out of Town" (1970)	"I Just Can't Help Believing" (1970)	"Most of All" (1970)

"I Just Can't Help Believing" is a song written by Barry Mann and Cynthia Weil.

The song was most successful after it was recorded by B. J. Thomas and released as a single in 1970. It went to No. 9 on the Billboard Hot 100 singles chart and spent one week at No. 1 on the Easy Listening (adult contemporary) chart.

Thomas re-recorded "I Just Can't Help Believing" with Vince Gill for his 2013 album The Living Room Sessions. This was released as a single on June 3, 2013.

== Elvis Presley cover ==
"I Just Can't Help Believin'"

Single by Elvis Presley

from the album That's the Way It Is
- B-side: "How the Web Was Woven"
- Released: 11 November 1970 (That's the Way It Is album); November 1971 (UK single)
- Recorded: August 11, 1970
- Venue: International Hotel, in Las Vegas
- Genre: Country; Blue-eyed soul
- Label: RCA
- Songwriters: Barry Mann; Cynthia Weil

Elvis Presley singles chronology
"It's Only Love" (1971)	"I Just Can't Help Believin'" (1970)	"Until It's Time for You to Go" (1972)

"I Just Can't Help Believing" was recorded by Elvis Presley in 1970 as a track on his album That's the Way It Is. A live version was released as a single in the UK in November 1971, peaking at No. 6. Presley's version also reached No. 6 in South Africa, and No. 12 in Ireland.

== Chart history ==
=== Weekly charts ===
B. J. Thomas

Chart (1970)	Peak position
Canada RPM Top Singles	18
US Billboard Hot 100	9
US Billboard Adult Contemporary	1
US Cash Box Top 100	11

Elvis Presley version

Chart (1971–72)	Peak position
Australia (Kent Music Report)	8
Belgium	10
Ireland (IRMA)	12
Netherlands	4
South Africa (Springbok)	6
Sweden	3
UK	6

=== Year-end charts ===
Chart (1970)	Rank
US Billboard Hot 100	75
US Cash Box	76

== Other cover versions ==
- The first release was as a single by Barry Mann on Capitol Records, which was reviewed in Billboard magazine on June 22, 1968.
- Bobby Vee covered it on his 1969 LP Gates, Grills & Railings.
- Bobby Doyle released it as a single in 1969 on the Warner Brothers label.
- Leonard Nimoy released a version on his 1969 album The Touch of Leonard Nimoy.
- David Frizzell's version reached No. 36 on the U.S. Billboard Country Singles chart in 1970.
- Filipina singer-actress Nora Aunor released it on her 1971 studio album The Song of My Life.
- The disco cover band Boys Town Gang released a version in the UK in July 1983, which reached No. 82.
- Barry Mann recorded the song again in 2000 for his solo album Soul & Inspiration.

== See also ==
- List of number-one adult contemporary singles of 1970 (U.S.)
