= You Don't Have to Say You Love Me =

English-language version of a 1965 Italian song

"You Don't Have to Say You Love Me" is the English-language version of the 1965 Italian song "Io che non vivo (senza te)" ("I, Who Can't Live (Without You)"), written by Pino Donaggio and Vito Pallavicini. The English lyrics were written for Dusty Springfield by Vicki Wickham and Simon Napier-Bell.

The Italian song was introduced at the 15th edition of the Sanremo Festival by Donaggio and his team partner Jody Miller. It reached the final at Sanremo and, as recorded by Donaggio, reached No. 1 in Italy in March 1965, remaining there for three weeks. "Io che non vivo (senza te)" was prominently featured on the soundtrack of the Luchino Visconti film Sandra, starring Claudia Cardinale, which was awarded the Golden Lion at the Venice Film Festival that September.

== Dusty Springfield version ==
"You Don't Have to Say You Love Me"
- Dutch vinyl single picture sleeve

Single by Dusty Springfield
- B-side: "Every Ounce of Strength" (Steve Cropper, Isaac Hayes, David Porter) (UK); "Little by Little" (US)
- Released: 25 March 1966
- Recorded: 9–10 March 1966
- Studio: Philips (London, UK)
- Genre: Pop
- Length: 2:47
- Label: Philips BF 1482
- Songwriters: Vicki Wickham; Simon Napier-Bell; Pino Donaggio; Vito Pallavicini
- Producer: Johnny Franz

Dusty Springfield UK singles chronology
"Little by Little" (1966)	"You Don't Have to Say You Love Me" (1966)	"Goin' Back" (1966)

Dusty Springfield US singles chronology
"I Just Don't Know What to Do with Myself" (1965)	"You Don't Have to Say You Love Me" (1966)	"All I See is You" (1966)

"You Don't Have to Say You Love Me" was recorded by Dusty Springfield in 1966 and proved to be her most successful single, reaching number one on the UK Singles Chart and number four on the Billboard Hot 100. Elvis Presley recorded a version in 1970 which was a hit in both the US and the UK. Other renditions have charted in the UK, Ireland, Italy and Finland.

Springfield, who participated at the 1965 Sanremo Festival, was in the audience when Donaggio and Miller performed "Io che non vivo (senza te)" and, although she did not know the meaning of the lyrics, the song moved Springfield to tears. She obtained an acetate recording of Donaggio's song but allowed a year to go by before actively pursuing the idea of recording an English version.

On 9 March 1966, Springfield had an instrumental track of Donaggio's song recorded at Philips Studio in London near Marble Arch. The session personnel included guitarist Big Jim Sullivan and drummer Bobby Graham. Springfield still lacked an English lyric to record, but Springfield's friend Vicki Wickham, the producer of Ready Steady Go!, wrote the required English lyric with her own friend Simon Napier-Bell, manager of the Yardbirds. Neither Wickham nor Napier-Bell had any discernible experience as songwriters. According to Napier-Bell, he and Wickham were dining out when she mentioned to him that Springfield hoped to get an English lyric for Donaggio's song, and the two light-heartedly took up the challenge of writing the lyric themselves: "We went back to [Wickham]'s flat and started working on it. We wanted to go to a trendy disco so we had about an hour to write it. We wrote the chorus and then we wrote the verse in a taxi to wherever we were going."

Neither Wickham nor Napier-Bell understood the original Italian lyrics. According to Wickham, they attempted to write their own lyric for an anti-love song to be called "I Don't Love You", but when that original idea proved unproductive, it was initially adjusted to "You Don't Love Me", then to "You Don't Have to Love Me", and finalised as "You Don't Have to Say You Love Me", a phrasing that fitted the song's melody. Napier-Bell later gave the same title to his first book, an autobiographical account of the British music scene of the 1960s.

Springfield recorded her vocal the next day. Unhappy with the acoustics in the recording booth she eventually moved into a stairwell to record. She was only satisfied with her vocals after she had recorded 47 takes.

Released on 25 March 1966 in the UK, the single release of Springfield's recording remains one of the songs most identified with her. The song was her most successful hit in the United Kingdom and United States; it went to number one in the UK charts and number 4 on the Billboard Hot 100 chart in the United States.

It proved so popular in the US that Springfield's 1965 album Ev'rything's Coming Up Dusty was released there with a slightly different track listing, and was retitled with the same name as the hit single (the B-side of the US single, "Little by Little", was issued in the UK as a separate A side and reached number 17 on that chart). The song also topped the charts peaking at number one in The Philippines and peaked at number one in NME top thirty charts, it stayed in the number 1 position for two weeks from the week commencing 14 May 1966 to the week ending 28 May 1966. It also hit number one in Melody Maker magazine in May 1966.

When Springfield died of breast cancer in March 1999, the song was featured on Now 42 as a tribute.

=== Reception ===
Cash Box described the song as a "hauntingly plaintive slow-shufflin' ode about an understanding gal who has no intention of tying her boyfriend down to her".

In 2004, the song made the Rolling Stone list of The 500 Greatest Songs of All Time at No. 491.

=== Certifications ===
Region	Certification	Certified units/sales
United Kingdom (BPI)	Silver	200,000^{‡}
^{‡} Sales+streaming figures based on certification alone.

== Charts ==
=== Pino Donaggio version ===
Chart (1965–1966)	Peak position
Italy (Musica e dischi)	1

=== Dusty Springfield version ===
Chart (1966)	Peak position
UK Singles Chart	1
New Musical Express	1
Melody Maker	1
Australian Kent Music Report	2
Canada RPM	4
The Official Finnish Charts	6
German Media Control	33
Irish Singles Chart	4
The Netherlands	33
Philippines Singles Chart	1
New Zealand singles Chart	9
US Billboard Hot 100	4
US Cashbox	3
US Adult Contemporary (Billboard)	8

== Elvis Presley version ==
"You Don't Have to Say You Love Me"

Single by Elvis Presley

from the album That's the Way It Is
- B-side: "Patch It Up"
- Released: 6 October 1970
- Recorded: 6 June 1970
- Studio: RCA Studio B, Nashville
- Genre: Pop
- Label: RCA Victor
- Songwriters: Vicki Wickham, Simon Napier-Bell, Pino Donaggio, Vito Pallavicini

Elvis Presley singles chronology
"I've Lost You" / "The Next Step Is Love" (1970)	"You Don't Have to Say You Love Me" / "Patch It Up" (1970)	"I Really Don't Want to Know" / "There Goes My Everything" (1970)

"You Don't Have to Say You Love Me" was recorded by Elvis Presley for his 1970 album release That's the Way It Is, from which it was issued as the second single 6 October 1970. The track had been recorded in the evening of 6 June 1970 in Studio B of RCA Studios (Nashville), being the third of seven songs recorded that night. The session producer, Felton Jarvis, felt that the second take was good enough to serve as the master track but Presley insisted on a third and final take.

Reaching No. 11 on the Hot 100 in Billboard magazine, "You Don't Have to Say You Love Me" afforded Presley a No. 1 hit on the Billboard Easy Listening chart, also reaching No. 56 on the Billboard C&W chart. It became a gold record. A hit for Presley in both Australia (No. 7) and Canada (No. 6), "You Don't Have to Say You Love Me" was twice a hit for Presley in the British Isles, with its original release reaching No. 9 in the UK and No. 17 in Ireland, in which territories the track's 2007 re-release charted with respective peaks of No. 16 and No. 29. The single went on to become the best-selling record of 1971 in Japan, with Oricon reporting sales of 225,000 copies, making Presley the first foreign artist in history to do so, until Michael Jackson released Thriller in 1984.

== Other versions ==
=== English-language versions ===
"You Don't Have to Say You Love Me" has been recorded by many artists, including:

- The Floaters, No. 28 US R&B in December 1977
- The Four Sonics, No. 32 US R&B and No. 78 Billboard Hot 100 in March 1968
- Guys 'n' Dolls, No. 5 UK (20 March 1976), No. 1 Ireland (chart debut 18 March 1976), No. 12 the Netherlands (24 September 1977), and No. 8 Belgium (Flemish Region) (1 October 1977)
- Red Hurley, No. 5 Ireland, chart debut 18 May 1978
- Wall Street Crash, a vocal octet led by Keith Strachan, had a No. 6 hit in Italy in the summer of 1983 after competing with the song at Festivalbar
- Denise Welch, whose 1995 remake was a double A-side hit with "Cry Me a River", charting at No. 23 in the UK.
- In October 1965, Richard Anthony recorded a French version of "Io che non vivo (senza te)", "Jamais je ne vivrai sans toi", which served as the title cut of an album release. In Quebec, Anthony's version of "Jamais je ne vivrai sans toi" competed with a local cover version by Margot Lefebvre, with both tracks co-ranked at No. 38 in the annual listing of the top hits of 1966.

== Sales and certifications ==
Elvis Presley version

Region	Certification	Certified units/sales
Japan	—	308,000
United States (RIAA)	Gold	500,000^{^}
^{^} Shipments figures based on certification alone.

== See also ==
- List of number-one singles from the 1960s (UK) § 1966
- List of number-one adult contemporary singles of 1970 (U.S.)
