= The Wonder of You =

1959 single by Ray Peterson

Song
- Released: 1958
- Songwriter: Baker Knight

"The Wonder of You" is a song written by Baker Knight. It was originally recorded by Vince Edwards in 1958, but this recording has never been released. In an interview with a DJ from Chattanooga, Tennessee, Ray Peterson told the story of how Baker Knight confided that "The Wonder of You" was originally written as a gospel song.

== Ray Peterson recording ==
In 1959, "The Wonder of You" was first released by Ray Peterson as a single. The song became a Top 40 hit for him on the Billboard Hot 100, peaking at No. 25, and it briefly re-entered the Hot 100 peaking at No. 70, in 1964. The 1959 Ray Peterson recording also reached No. 23 on the UK Singles Chart and Canada.

== Elvis Presley version ==
"The Wonder of You"

Single by Elvis Presley

from the album On Stage
- B-side: "Mama Liked the Roses"
- Released: April 20, 1970
- Recorded: February 19, 1970
- Venue: International Hotel, Las Vegas, Nevada
- Genre: Soft rock, pop
- Length: 2:34
- Label: RCA Victor
- Songwriter: Baker Knight

Elvis Presley singles chronology
"Kentucky Rain" (1970)	"The Wonder of You" / "Mama Liked the Roses" (1970)	"I've Lost You" / "The Next Step Is Love" (1970)

Music video
- "The Wonder of You" (audio) on YouTube

Elvis Presley had a No. 1 hit in the UK and a Top 10 hit in the U.S. with his 1970 live version of "The Wonder of You" recorded in Las Vegas, Nevada in February 1970 and released on his live album On Stage. The song was released as a single on April 20, 1970, backed by the song "Mama Liked the Roses". In the United States, both songs charted at No. 9 together during 27 June - 11 July 1970. The song reached No. 7 in Canada. "The Wonder of You" was one of his most successful records in the UK ever, topping the UK Singles Chart for six weeks in the summer of that year. It has sold over 400,000 equivalent units in the UK, qualifying the single for a gold sales certification in 2022. It also stayed at number one in the Irish Singles Chart for three weeks that same year. This was the 59th Top 40 hit of his career. Presley's version also reached number 37 on the US Country Singles chart, and number one on the easy listening chart.

"The Wonder of You" was one of about thirty-five songs Presley would regularly perform at concerts.

According to Peterson, "He [Elvis] asked me if I would mind if he recorded 'The Wonder of You.' I said, 'You don't have to ask permission; you're Elvis Presley.' He said, 'Yes, I do. You're Ray Peterson.'"

In 2016, a version of the song featuring the Royal Philharmonic Orchestra was released together with other orchestral versions of Elvis songs in the album The Wonder of You.

== References in media ==
The Japanese manga JoJolion features a "Stand", a manifestation of a character's fighting spirit, named "Wonder of U".

== Other recordings ==
- Also in 1959, it was recorded by Ronnie Hilton. His version was also a hit reaching No. 22 on the UK Singles Chart. The song later appeared on the 2017 second season episode "Matrimonium" of the TV series The Crown.
- The Platters also recorded this song, which appeared on a 1970s compilation The Platters – 30 Golden Hits.
- In 1969, the Sandpipers recorded an album of the same name including the song.
- An album of instrumentals of the same name by Nelson Riddle was also released in 2000.
- In 2017, Conor O'Brien recorded the song for Big Little Lies that was sung by Ed Mackenzie (played by Adam Scott) in the first-season finale "You Get What You Need".
- Uruguayan punk/rockabilly band Rudos Wild recorded the song for their debut album Psychos With Wax.

== Popularity in association football ==
The song has been adopted by English Association football club Port Vale, which runs out to the song at the start of its home matches, while the club's fans sing the song throughout their matches, periodically with altered lyrics. Arsenal Football Club also adopted the song as their opening anthem upon their move to the Emirates Stadium. Scottish club Ross County have also adopted the song as an anthem at the end of home matches.

== See also ==
- List of number-one singles of 1970 (Ireland)
- List of UK Singles Chart number ones of the 1970s
- List of number-one adult contemporary singles of 1970 (U.S.)
