= Elvis: The Concert =

Music Concert Tour

Elvis: The Concert (also known as Elvis Presley In Concert) is a concert tour started in 1997 that features audio and video recordings of Elvis Presley, accompanied live by his 1970s backup band, backing vocalists, and orchestral musicians. In 2001, Elvis Presley Enterprises (EPE), on the website Elvis.com, described this show as, "in effect, Elvis' first-ever world concert tour, which began in America in 1998." According to EPE in 2006, the tour also features a 16-piece orchestra; at least for the major anniversary concerts, this role was fulfilled by the Memphis Symphony Orchestra.

According to EPE, in 1998, the tour received a Guinness World Record "as the first live tour headlined by a performer who is no longer living." The tour visited the United States, various countries in Europe, Australia, and Japan, including such notable venues as Radio City Music Hall in New York City, NY, US and Wembley Arena in London, England, UK. Elvis: The Concert shows were also performed every year during this time during the annual Elvis Week festival organized by EPE and Graceland.

The main series of concerts continued until 2014, when they were succeeded by a similar style of tour but not utilizing the TCB Band or original 'alumni' backing vocalists or musicians. In 2017, this similar style of tour (not featuring the TCB Band, original backing vocalists, or any other original musicians) performed across the United States, United Kingdom, and elsewhere in Europe, to promote the Royal Philharmonic Orchestra (RPO) remix albums If I Can Dream (2015) and The Wonder of You (2016), as well as the 40th anniversary of Elvis Presley's death. The UK tour featured the Royal Philharmonic Orchestra, while the US and European tours featured different orchestras in place of the RPO.

In 2019, for the first time since 2014, members of the TCB Band performed a new Elvis: The Concert-style show, alongside the Royal Philharmonic Orchestra, combining elements from the 2016-2018 Presley/Philharmonic tours with the old 1997-2014 TCB Band tours; however, no further tours with the TCB Band members were booked after this point. Despite this, the TCB Band (then composed of Burton, Hardin, and Tutt) performed at the Elvis: The Concert show that year during Elvis Week, alongside "other veterans" of Elvis Presley's 1970s-era touring group.

== History and overview ==
=== Origins, 1997 inaugural show, and subsequent national and world tours (1997–2007) ===
In the mid-1990s, Elvis Presley Enterprises started experimenting with recordings of Presley's live concerts, and discovered that through the use of sound mixing they were able to eliminate virtually all of the ambient noise from the multitrack recordings, thus leaving only Presley's voice. After some work, they conceived a special concert, entitled "Elvis In Concert' 97", to be held on August 16, 1997, the twentieth anniversary of Presley's death. Johnson "directed and staged" the performances, with Guercio credited with "musical direction". The show was conceived by Todd Morgan, Randy Johnson, Elvis' touring orchestral conductor Joe Guercio, and Stig Edgren. Elvis Presley Enterprises produced the main anniversary shows in Memphis, while Stig Edgren and his company SEG Events produced the touring versions. Johnson "directed and staged" the performances, with Guercio credited with "musical direction".

The show featured the core of the longest serving lineup of Presley's 1970s back-up band, the TCB Band (lead guitarist James Burton, bassist Jerry Scheff, pianist Glen D. Hardin, and drummer Ronnie Tutt) and his backup singers (The Stamps Quartet, The Imperials, The Sweet Inspirations, and Millie Kirkham). Rhythm guitarist John Wilkinson, having suffered a stroke in 1989, was unable to join the band and was replaced by Tony Smith. Nashville session drummer Paul Leim occasionally substituted for Tutt while Tutt was (simultaneously) touring with Neil Diamond (Tutt has toured with Diamond since 1981).

The inaugural show was performed at Memphis, Tennessee's Mid-South Coliseum. The format of the show generally follows one of Presley's 1970s live concerts, albeit somewhat differently to take advantage of the select amount of professional video of Presley's performances. The professional footage used comes from Elvis: That's the Way It Is (1970), Elvis On Tour (1972), and Aloha from Hawaii via Satellite (1973) and from outtakes from the 1970 and 1972 documentaries/concert films. In later years, footage from Singer Presents...Elvis, also known as "the '68 Comeback Special" was added to the tour.

During the initial August 16, 1997 show, Priscilla Presley introduced a music video of Lisa Marie Presley performing a "virtual duet" with her father on his 1970 hit "Don't Cry Daddy". It was so successful that the video was shown again. At the August 16, 1997 show, Presley's former announcer Al Dvorin closed the show by saying "Elvis has left for Graceland".

The show was a huge success, gaining worldwide press. The massive success of the show prompted EPE to draw up plans for a special version of the show to take on the road. Starting in 1998, a scaled-down version of the show was taken on tour across the United States. After a domestic tour (which ended with a show at the Market Square Arena in Indianapolis, IN, the site of Presley's final live concert on June 26, 1977), the show went to Europe, Asia, and Australia.

In later years, various members of Elvis' musicians rotated between shows and tours, and some additional musicians were added over time; for example, members of The Imperials, The Stamps Quartet, and Voice rotated in and out of the touring group.

=== Elvis: The 25th Anniversary Concert (2002) ===
In 2002, a special sold-out 25th anniversary show commemorating the 25th anniversary of Presley's death was held in Memphis, TN at the Pyramid Arena. This show was even bigger than the 20th anniversary concert, and featured three different acts. The first act served as a retrospective of Presley's career from 1956 to 1968. Presley's former drummer D.J. Fontana made an appearance, playing drums to footage from one of Presley's appearances on The Steve Allen Show. (However, Elvis' original lead guitarist Scotty Moore was absent, even though he was still active as a musician). Saxophonist Boots Randolph made an appearance as well playing sax on "Blue Suede Shoes" and on a performance of "Return to Sender" (taken from his movie Girls! Girls! Girls!) as part of a special section highlighting Presley's career in movies.

Act Two showed the gospel side of Elvis. During a special section of gospel music, a surprise was in store for fans as J.D. Sumner's voice was multi-tracked for a performance (with Elvis and the Stamps) of "Why Me, Lord?" Lisa Marie also made an appearance singing an original song she wrote called "Nobody Noticed It (You're Still Lovely)".

Act 3 was the usual Elvis: the Concert show format and featured new songs, like "Are You Lonesome Tonight?" from That's The Way It Is outtakes. The Jordanaires also performed at this concert. This was the only show in which John Wilkinson, who was Presley's rhythm guitarist from 1969 to 1977, made an appearance, as a result of health complications following a stroke. Wilkinson is not shown on the official DVD Elvis Lives (further details below), but he can be seen on the fan footage of this show. At the August 16, 2002 show, former announcer Al Dvorin returned to close the show by saying "Elvis has left for Graceland".

=== Elvis: The 30th Anniversary Concert (2007) ===
On August 16, 2007, Elvis: The 30th Anniversary Concert was held at the FedEx Forum in Memphis and was on a bigger scale than the 20th and 25th anniversary concerts. It featured many Elvis alumni musicians. Some musicians had originally recorded and/or toured with Elvis Presley as far back as the 1950s; this included Elvis' original drummer D.J. Fontana, soprano and session vocalist Millie Kirkham, and Gordon Stoker and Ray Walker of The Jordanaires. As always, the show also featured musicians who had worked with Elvis Presley during the 1969-1977 "concert years"; this included James Burton, Jerry Scheff, Glen D. Hardin, and Ronnie Tutt of the TCB Band. Backing vocalists included Myrna Smith and Estelle Brown of the Sweet Inspirations; Terry Blackwood, Joe Moscheo, and Sherman Andrus of the Imperials (joined by new member Gus Gaches); and Ed Hill, Donnie Sumner, Bill Baize, and J.D. Sumner of the Stamps Quartet. This group of musicians and backing vocalists were augmented by The Dempseys and members of the Memphis Symphony Orchestra.

The 30th Anniversary featured another "virtual duet" by Elvis Presley and Lisa Marie Presley: "In The Ghetto".

=== Later performances and similar touring groups (2007-2014, 2017, 2019) ===
At the August 16, 2007 show, Priscilla reportedly announced that this would be the final show for Elvis: The Concert.

Despite this, the main series of Elvis: The Concert-style shows, sometimes titled Elvis Presley In Concert, continued through 2013. In 2014, the main series of concerts was succeeded by a similar style of tour but not utilizing the TCB Band or original 'alumni' backing vocalists or musicians.

In 2017, this similar style of tour (not featuring the TCB Band, original backing vocalists, or any other original musicians) performed across the United States, United Kingdom, and elsewhere in Europe, to promote the Royal Philharmonic Orchestra (RPO) remix albums If I Can Dream (2015) and The Wonder of You (2016), as well as the 40th anniversary of Elvis Presley's death. The UK tour featured the Royal Philharmonic Orchestra, while the US and European tours featured different orchestras in place of the RPO.

In 2019, for the first time since 2014, members of the TCB Band performed a new Elvis: The Concert-style show, alongside the Royal Philharmonic Orchestra, combining elements from the 2016-2018 Presley/Philharmonic tours with the old 1997-2014 TCB Band tours; however, no further tours with the TCB Band members were booked after this point. espite this, the TCB Band (then composed of Burton, Hardin, and Tutt) performed at the Elvis: The Concert show that year during Elvis Week, alongside "other veterans" of Elvis Presley's 1970s-era touring group.

== Show format ==
The format of the show begins with the traditional opening theme of Presley's concerts: "Also sprach Zarathustra" by Richard Strauss (better known as the theme to the movie 2001: A Space Odyssey), followed by the traditionally adopted tune "viva Elvis", This segues into the song "See See Rider" from Elvis: Aloha from Hawaii.

The show was generally divided into two different acts, each one 45 minutes to an hour, with an intermission between them. The main material used for the shows comes from Elvis: That's the Way It Is, Elvis: Aloha from Hawaii, and Elvis on Tour. And in recent years songs from the '68 Comeback Special has been added to the mix, most notably the songs "Trouble" (which usually segues into either "Hound Dog" or "That's All Right"), and "If I Can Dream" which is used to end the first act.

At select anniversary concerts in Memphis (see below), another act was added preceding the usual first act. This often included a retrospective of Presley's career from 1956 to 1968, and some of these anniversary concerts also included guest appearances from musicians who were not normally part of the "new" touring ensemble, such as D.J. Fontana, Gordon Stoker and Ray Walker of the Jordanaires, and Millie Kirkham.

During the show, a large video screen hangs above the main set upon which the video of Presley's performance is projected. Two smaller screens hang on either side, and video of the live musicians, or special video packages are shown.

The first act usually ends with a gospel music segment. If The Imperials are performing, they perform a solo version of "He Touched Me". If the Stamps are performing, they perform an a cappella rendition of "Sweet, Sweet Spirit" (after an introduction by Elvis from the movie Elvis on Tour). After that song, a version of "How Great Thou Art" by Elvis is played with the band. In early shows, this proved to be problematic: since the audio was taken from the 1974 live album Elvis As Recorded Live on Stage in Memphis, but there was no video footage. Thus, the screen was left black, and only the audio was played. After a few tours, a special piece of footage was made from the 1972 movie Elvis on Tour which was edited, sped up, and slowed down in a few places in order to have it match up with the 1974 audio.

The show always ends with Presley's traditional show closer "Can't Help Falling in Love", and the traditional announcement of "Elvis has left the building." At the 1997 and 2002 anniversary concerts, Presley's former announcer Al Dvorin closed the show by saying "Elvis has left for Graceland".

=== Elvis: The 25th Anniversary Concert (2002) ===
In 2002, a show commemorating the 25th anniversary of Presley's death was held. This show was even bigger than the 20th anniversary concert, and featured three different acts. The first act served as a retrospective of Presley's career from 1956 to 1968. Presley's former drummer D.J. Fontana made an appearance, playing drums to footage from one of Presley's appearances on The Steve Allen Show. Saxophonist Boots Randolph made an appearance as well playing sax on "Blue Suede Shoes" and on a performance of "Return to Sender" (taken from his movie Girls! Girls! Girls!) as part of a special section highlighting Presley's career in movies.

Act Two showed the gospel side of Elvis. During a special section of gospel music, a surprise was in store for fans as J.D. Sumner's (one of Elvis' former bass vocalists, and the leader of the Stamps Quartet) voice was multi-tracked for a performance (with Elvis and the Stamps) of "Why Me, Lord?" Lisa Marie also made an appearance singing an original song she wrote called "Nobody Noticed It (You're Still Lovely)".

Act 3 was the usual Elvis: the Concert show format and featured new songs, like "Are You Lonesome Tonight?" from That's The Way It Is outtakes.

=== Elvis: The 30th Anniversary Concert (2007) ===
On August 16, 2007, Elvis: The 30th Anniversary Concert was held at the FedEx Forum in Memphis and was on a bigger scale than the 20th and 25th anniversary concerts. It featured:

- Joe Guercio (musical director and conductor)
- the TCB Band members James Burton (lead guitar), Glen D. Hardin (piano), Jerry Scheff (bass), and Ronnie Tutt (drums)
- Sweet Inspirations members Myrna Smith, and Estelle Brown
- Imperials members Sherman Andrus, Terry Blackwood, Joe Moscheo, and Gus Gaches
- Stamps members Bill Baize, Ed Hill, Larry Strickland, and Donnie Sumner
- Jordanaires members Gordon Stoker and Ray Walker
- D.J. Fontana (drums) and Millie Kirkham (soprano).

Also appearing:

- The Dempseys and members of the Memphis Symphony Orchestra.

The 30th Anniversary featured another duet by Elvis Presley and Lisa Marie Presley: "In The Ghetto".

Also, a new opening was done for the show which featured a space view of Earth which zoomed in on Memphis and then Graceland, right into the window which led to Presley's bedroom. There, "Elvis" is getting ready for the show with Jerry Schilling giving him his sunglasses. They go down the stairs to the outside of Graceland where they meet up with Joe Esposito and then go into a helicopter. The group flies to the Fed-Ex Forum where audio of Elvis (from the live album An Afternoon in the Garden, recorded in 1972 and released in 1997) says "It's a big place, man". Then they land and go inside the arena, starting the show.

== Participating "Elvis alumni" musicians ==
The lineup of musicians involved includes:

=== TCB Band ===
- James Burton – Lead Guitar
- John Wilkinson – Rhythm Guitar (one-off guest only on August 16, 2002)
- Jerry Scheff – Bass
  - After Scheff left the TCB band, he has been replaced on the more recent tours by Norbert Putnam
- Ronnie Tutt (or occasionally Paul Leim) – Drums
- Glen D. Hardin – Piano, Keyboards

=== Backing vocalists and orchestral musicians ===
==== Backing vocals ====
- The Sweet Inspirations
  - Estelle Brown
  - Myrna Smith
  - Portia Griffin (Note: Portia Brown was not a member of the Sweet Inspirations when they toured with Elvis; she joined the group at a later date.)
  - Kelly Jones (Note: Kelly Jones was not a member of the Sweet Inspirations when they toured with Elvis; she joined the group at a later date.)
- The Stamps Quartet (Note: The different male vocal groups alternate between tours, taking over whenever the other group is unable to perform.)
  - J.D. Sumner (1997-1998; died 1998)
  - Larry Strickland
  - Ed Enoch
  - Ed Hill
  - Royce Taylor (Note: Royce Taylor was not a member of the Stamps when they toured with Elvis; he joined the group at a later date.)
  - Butch Owens (Note: Butch Owens was not a member of the Stamps when they toured with Elvis; he joined the group at a later date.)
- The Imperials (Note: The different male vocal groups alternate between tours, taking over whenever the other group is unable to perform.)
  - Terry Blackwood
  - Joe Moscheo
  - Sherman Andrus
  - Gus Gaches (Note: Gus Gaches was not a member of the Stamps when they toured with Elvis; he joined the group at a later date.)
- Voice (Note: The different male vocal groups alternate between tours, taking over whenever the other group is unable to perform.)
  - Sherrill Nielsen
  - Donnie Sumner
  - Tim Baty

Orchestral musicians

- Joe Guercio – Orchestra Conductor, "musical direction"
- Tony Smith – rhythm guitar (Note: Smith did not tour with Elvis Presley; he was hired to replace an incapacitated John Wilkinson, Presley's rhythm guitarist from 1969-1977.)
- Walt Johnson – lead trumpet (2005)
- Ron Feuer – keyboards (2005)

=== Other occasional special guests (select concerts only) ===
- D.J. Fontana – Drums (August 16, 2002; August 16, 2007)
- Boots Randolph – Saxophone (August 16, 2002)
- The Jordanaires – Backing vocals (select concerts only, including August 16, 2002, and August 16, 2007)
  - Gordon Stoker
  - Ray Walker

== Home media ==
In 2006, the 2002 25th Anniversary Concert was made available on DVD form in a disc called Elvis Lives. An abbreviated version of the concert is occasionally broadcast on PBS stations in the US, including Memphis' PBS affiliate WKNO. Elvis Lives only contains Act III (the 1970s-style concert), which was a regular Elvis: The Concert segment. The DVD version also includes interviews with Presley's former musicians, reminiscing about their time working with Elvis and discussing the "new" touring format.

Shortly after the 2007 30th anniversary concert, the partially re-recorded "virtual duet" of "In the Ghetto" by Elvis Presley and Lisa Marie Presley was released as a single and as a downloadable music video on iTunes.
