= A Black & White Night Live =

Live album by Roy Orbison
- Released: October 23, 1989
- Recorded: September 30, 1987
- Venues: Coconut Grove Ambassador Hotel, Los Angeles
- Genres: Rockabilly, country
- Length: 57:32
- Label: Virgin
- Producer: T-Bone Burnett

Roy Orbison chronology
Mystery Girl (1989)	A Black & White Night Live (1989)	King of Hearts (1992)

Alternative cover
- 1999 cover art

A Black & White Night Live is a Roy Orbison music album released posthumously by Virgin Records from the HBO television special, Roy Orbison and Friends: A Black and White Night, which was filmed in 1987 and broadcast in 1988. According to the authorised Roy Orbison biography, the album was released in October 1989 and included the song "Blue Bayou" which because of time constraints had been deleted from the televised broadcast. However, it did not include the songs "Claudette" and "Blue Angel", which were also cut from the original broadcast for the same reason.

The SACD/CD Hybrid Audio Disc includes "Blue Angel" as a bonus track; the SACD/CD Hybrid Disc is contained in a pack with the DVD released by Image Entertainment, USA (ID27700BDVD). "Claudette" was included in later releases of the concert. According to the authorised biography, all tracks are now released on the 30 year anniversary Black & White Night 30.

On piano was Glen D. Hardin, who had played piano for Buddy Holly as well as Elvis Presley. Lead guitarist James Burton, drummer Ronnie Tutt and bassist Jerry Scheff were also from Presley's group. Male background vocals and some guitars were provided by Bruce Springsteen, Tom Waits, Elvis Costello, Jackson Browne, JD Souther and Steven Soles. Female background vocalists were k.d. lang, Jennifer Warnes and Bonnie Raitt.

Not all the stars were on stage. Glimpses of celebrities in the audience can be seen, including David Lynch, Kris Kristofferson, Patrick Swayze, Billy Idol and Sandra Bernhard.

On February 24, 2017, a 30th anniversary edition, titled Black & White Night 30, was released. The edition has been expanded, re-edited to include new footage and original running order to set list, and remastered. It is available both as a CD/DVD and a CD/Blu-ray set. This release has sold 161,400 copies as of March 2017.

== Critical reception ==
Professional ratings
Review scores
Source	Rating
AllMusic	4/5 stars
American Songwriter	4/5 stars
The Encyclopedia of Popular Music	3/5 stars
MusicHound	3/5 stars

Bruce Eder of AllMusic writes, "The best-recorded Roy Orbison live disc ever issued, taken from the soundtrack of the HBO concert from the 1980s with VIP guests like Bruce Springsteen and Elvis Costello. This was a sort of magical video, and the performances are splendid, along with the good feelings involved."

Grant Britt of American Songwriter also thinks this album rates 4 out of 5 stars and calls Black and White Night "one of the best rock shows ever filmed."

No Depression's review, also by Grant Britt, begins with, "The voice grabs you and won't let go. It’s impossible to duplicate, a soaring, ethereal instrument that swoops and dips with a range few humans ever get within earshot of. Roy Orbison was a musical God, his songwriting skills just as awe-inspiring as his vocal abilities. His legacy endures with a wealth of recorded material, but nothing eclipses 1987’s Black and White Night"

Ryan Reed writes for Rolling Stone, "In a backstage interview, Costello called Orbison "the greatest," explaining how he learned about the singer's music second-hand through the Beatles."

Gary Graff reviews the album for Billboard and writes, "The Black & White Night show was a pivotal event during Roy Orbison's late '80s comeback. Preceding his involvement with the all-star Traveling Wilburys band (Orbison, George Harrison, Bob Dylan, Tom Petty and Jeff Lynne), the show put a spotlight on Orbison's classic hits with help from Elvis Presley's TCB Band and guests Bruce Springsteen, Elvis Costello, Bonnie Raitt, k.d. Lang, Tom Waits, Jackson Browne, JD Souther and Steven Soles."

== Connection to Twin Peaks ==
Film director David Lynch attended the live recording at the Fox Theater and is briefly visible in the HBO broadcast of the event. He hired a then-unknown Harry Goaz as his driver for the evening. Goaz so impressed Lynch with his ingenuousness that he was cast on the spot to play Deputy Andy Brennan in Twin Peaks, then in pre-production.

== Track listing ==
All tracks are written by Roy Orbison and Joe Melson, except as noted.

1989 release
No.	Title	Writer(s)	Length
1.	"Only the Lonely"		2:43
2.	"In Dreams"	Roy Orbison	3:10
3.	"Dream Baby"	Cindy Walker	3:50
4.	"Leah"	Roy Orbison	3:00
5.	"(Move On) Down the Line"	Roy Orbison	5:13
6.	"Crying"		3:08
7.	"Mean Woman Blues"	Claude Demetrius	3:07
8.	"Running Scared"		2:31
9.	"Blue Bayou" (not on the original video release)		3:11
10.	"Candy Man"	Fred Neil; Beverly "Ruby" Ross	3:34
11.	"Uptown"		3:20
12.	"Ooby Dooby"	Dick Penner; Wade Moore	4:11
13.	"The Comedians"	Elvis Costello	3:37
14.	"(All I Can Do Is) Dream You"	Billy Burnette; David Malloy	3:26
15.	"It's Over"	Roy Orbison; Bill Dees	3:13
16.	"Oh, Pretty Woman"	Roy Orbison; Bill Dees	6:15
Total length:			57:29

1999 release
No.	Title	Writer(s)	Length
1.	"Only the Lonely"		2:59
2.	"Dream Baby (How Long Must I Dream)"	Cindy Walker	3:57
3.	"Blue Bayou" (not on the original video release)		3:16
4.	"The Comedians"	Elvis Costello	3:30
5.	"Ooby Dooby"	Dick Penner; Wade Moore	4:08
6.	"Leah"	Roy Orbison	3:07
7.	"Running Scared"		2:30
8.	"Uptown"		3:22
9.	"In Dreams"	Roy Orbison	3:16
10.	"Crying"		3:14
11.	"Candy Man"	Fred Neil; Ronald & Ruby; Beverly "Ruby" Ross	3:32
12.	"Go Go Go (Down the Line)"	Roy Orbison	5:28
13.	"Mean Woman Blues"	Claude Demetrius	3:00
14.	"(All I Can Do is) Dream You"	Billy Burnette; David Malloy	3:36
15.	"Claudette" (not on the original video release)	Roy Orbison	3:01
16.	"It's Over"	Roy Orbison; Bill Dees	3:09
17.	"Oh, Pretty Woman"	Roy Orbison; Bill Dees	6:35
Total length:			61:40

Black and White Night 30 (30th Anniversary expanded reissue in 2017)
No.	Title	Writer(s)	Length
1.	"Only the Lonely"		2:38
2.	"Leah"		3:01
3.	"In Dreams"	Roy Orbison	3:02
4.	"Crying"		3:02
5.	"Uptown"		3:22
6.	"The Comedians"	Elvis Costello	3:30
7.	"Blue Angel" (not on the original video release)		3:05
8.	"It's Over"	Roy Orbison; Bill Dees	3:14
9.	"Running Scared"		2:22
10.	"Dream Baby (How Long Must I Dream)"	Cindy Walker	3:47
11.	"Mean Woman Blues"	Claude Demetrius	2:56
12.	"Candy Man"	Fred Neil; Ronald & Ruby; Beverly "Ruby" Ross	3:29
13.	"Ooby Dooby"		4:08
14.	"Blue Bayou"		3:11
15.	"Go! Go! Go! (Down the Line)"		5:31
16.	"(All I Can Do Is) Dream You"	Billy Burnette; David Malloy	3:31
17.	"Claudette"	Roy Orbison	3:04
18.	"Oh, Pretty Woman" (alternate version)	Roy Orbison; Bill Dees	2:52
19.	"Oh, Pretty Woman"	Roy Orbison; Bill Dees	6:06
Total length:			65:51

Digital download (Secret Post Show)
No.	Title	Writer(s)	Length
1.	"(All I Can Do Is) Dream You" (alternate version)	Billy Burnette; David Malloy
2.	"The Comedians" (alternate version)	Elvis Costello
3.	"Candy Man" (alternate version)	Fred Neil; Ronald & Ruby; Beverly "Ruby" Ross
4.	"Claudette" (alternate version)	Roy Orbison
5.	"Uptown" (alternate version)

== Personnel ==
- Roy Orbison - lead vocals, electric rhythm guitar, electric lead guitar on "Ooby Dooby" and "Go, Go, Go (Down the Line)," harmonica on "Candy Man"
- T-Bone Burnett - acoustic guitar
- Glen D. Hardin - piano
- James Burton - electric and acoustic lead guitars, electric and acoustic rhythm guitars
- Jerry Scheff - upright bass
- Ronnie Tutt - drums
- Alex Acuña - percussion
- Michael Utley - keyboards
- Tom Waits - electric organ, acoustic guitar
- Bruce Springsteen - rhythm and lead electric guitar, harmony vocals, backing vocals
- Elvis Costello - acoustic guitar, electric organ, harmonica, backing Vocals
- JD Souther - backing vocals, harmony vocals, acoustic guitar
- Jackson Browne - backing vocals
- k.d. lang - backing vocals
- Bonnie Raitt - backing vocals
- Steven Soles - backing vocals
- Jennifer Warnes - backing vocals

== Charts ==
Chart (1989)	Peak position
Australian Albums (ARIA)	28
Dutch Albums (Album Top 100)	68
New Zealand Albums (RMNZ)	14
Swedish Albums (Sverigetopplistan)	45
UK Albums (Official Charts)	51
US Billboard 200	123
US Top Country Albums (Billboard)	43

== Certifications ==
Region	Certification	Certified units/sales
Australia (ARIA)	Gold	35,000^{^}
Spain (Promusicae)	Gold	50,000^{^}
^{^} Shipments figures based on certification alone.
