= TCB Band =

Elvis Presley's tour band from the 1970s

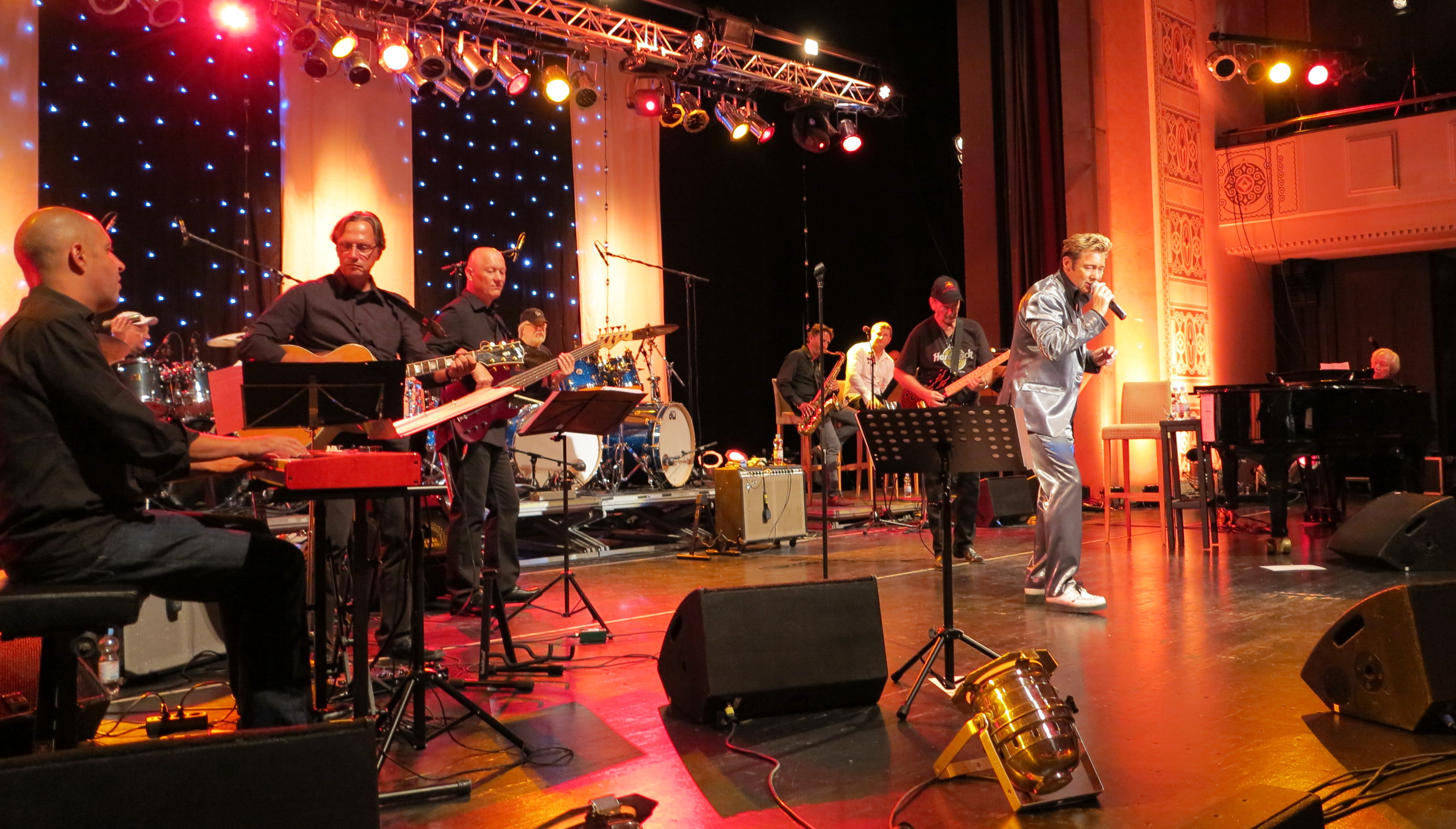
- TCB Band 2013 at 12th European Elvis Festival in Bad Nauheim: Glen Hardin (p), Ron Tutt (d), James Burton (g), and Austrian singer Dennis Jale

Background information
- Origin: Los Angeles, California, U.S.
- Genre: Rock
- Years active: 1969–1977; 1979; 1981; 1987; 1997–present
- Labels: RCA; Sony BMG
- Members: James Burton; Glen D. Hardin
- Past members: Larry Muhoberac; Jerry Scheff; John Wilkinson; Ronnie Tutt; Bob Lanning; Emory Gordy, Jr.; Duke Bardwell; David Briggs; Larrie Londin; Tony Brown; Bobby Ogdin; Norbert Putnam

The TCB Band is a group of musicians who formed the rhythm section of Elvis Presley's band from August 1969 until his death in 1977 (depending on the context, the nickname may also extend to Presley's background vocalists during that same period: the Imperials, the Sweet Inspirations, and JD Sumner and The Stamps Quartet). The initials TCB stand for Taking Care of Business, a personal motto Presley adopted in the early 1970s. Although personnel changed over the years, the original members were James Burton (lead guitar), Jerry Scheff (bass), John Wilkinson (rhythm guitar), Larry Muhoberac (keyboards) and Ron Tutt (drums). They first appeared live at Presley's first Las Vegas performance at what was then known as the International Hotel (later the Las Vegas Hilton, now Westgate Las Vegas Resort and Casino) on July 31, 1969.

== History ==
When planning his return to live performing after his successful 1968 NBC television comeback, Presley had to replace original band members Scotty Moore, D.J. Fontana (who had returned to session work) and Bill Black who had formed the Bill Black Combo before his death in 1965.

Presley's first call was to guitarist James Burton, who was from Ricky Nelson's band and a session musician in Nashville and Los Angeles, whom he asked to help form the group after knowing about him for many years and seeing him on television. After keyboardist Glen D. Hardin declined Burton's offer to join the group, Larry Muhoberac, who had played on several of Presley's movie soundtrack sessions, accepted his offer to perform. Burton later added Jerry Scheff on bass and John Wilkinson on rhythm guitar. Muhoberac suggested Ron Tutt for the drums to round out the section. By February 1970, Glen D. Hardin joined on keyboards, replacing Muhoberac who returned to studio work in Los Angeles. (According to Hardin, Muhoberac, "for reasons of his own, didn't want to go on the road anymore.") At that time Bob Lanning, a Los Angeles session drummer joined on drums, briefly replacing Tutt, who had returned by July.

In 1975, Burton, Tutt and Muhoberac backed Johnny Cash on his album, John R. Cash. Before Presley's death in 1977, several current and former members from the TCB Band, initially simultaneously, went on to form the core of Emmylou Harris's Hot Band and later John Denver's band. These musicians included James Burton, Glen D. Hardin, Emory Gordy Jr., and Jerry Scheff. Burton left the Hot Band in early 1976 to focus fully on his work with Presley and the TCB Band, and he was replaced in the Hot Band by English guitarist Albert Lee. (Scheff was never a member of the Hot Band.) Hardin left the TCB Band in early 1976 to work full-time with Emmylou Harris, and he was replaced by Tony Brown. Larrie Londin, a Nashville session drummer who recorded and occasionally toured with Presley over a nine-year period, filled in for Tutt on occasion during 1976 and 1977 performances.

== Tours with other musicians: After the TCB Band disbanded ==
Before Presley's death in 1977, several former members from the TCB Band went on to form Emmylou Harris's Hot Band and the John Denver Band. These musicians include James Burton, Glen D. Hardin, Emory Gordy Jr. and Jerry Scheff. Burton left the Hot Band in 1976 and was replaced by English guitarist Albert Lee. Scheff was never a member of the Hot Band. Gordy left John Denver's band in 1980 (before rejoining briefly in 1989 and once again in 1991) and was replaced by Scheff. Burton, Hardin, and Scheff remained in John Denver's band until early 1994.

After drumming a few years with the Jerry Garcia Band before Presley's death, Neil Diamond asked Ron Tutt to join him as his full-time drummer for both live tours and studio recordings. Tutt's drumming has since become a feature to Diamond's concert shows, punctuating moments in the Diamond concert with his TCB Band style drum fills and cymbal crashes. Tutt is a workman celebrity drummer, and routinely receives concert crowd ovations when he appears and takes his seat at his drum kit. Noteworthy during concerts is Tutt's soaring drum work on the song, "Holly Holy". Tutt recorded and toured with Diamond until Diamond's retirement from touring after he was diagnosed with Parkinson's disease.

Tutt also appears on several of recordings by Nancy Sinatra.

== Reunions (1979, 1981, 1987, 1997–present) ==
The TCB Band reunited with a new lineup to record their own album in 1979 of covers of Elvis Presley songs as a tribute. They also reunited in 1981 as the backing band for Tony Sheridan, augmented by Klaus Voormann and again mostly featuring Sheridan's recordings of Elvis Presley songs.

In July 1987, Burton, Hardin, Tutt, and Scheff reunited to participate in a British television special (Love Me Tender: A Tribute to the Music of Elvis Presley) featuring many British and American musicians, some of whom were Presley's contemporaries; the TCB Band backed Roger Daltrey of the Who for performances of "Mystery Train" and "Lawdy Miss Clawdy", and Daltrey and the TCB Band joined Carl Perkins for a performance of "Blue Suede Shoes". The special aired in August 1987. In September 1987, Burton, Scheff (who played double bass instead of electric bass), Hardin, and Tutt reunited again to serve as the core of the backing band for Presley's contemporary Roy Orbison for his TV special and live album titled Roy Orbison and Friends, A Black and White Night.

Burton, Hardin, Scheff, and Tutt reunited again in 1997 to perform Elvis: The Concert, with John Wilkinson rejoining for the 25th anniversary concert in Memphis. Since then, Burton, Hardin, Tutt and Scheff have toured frequently together in various formats, including the Elvis: The Concert tours and special Elvis: The Concert shows during the annual Elvis Week festival organized by EPE and Graceland. They have also often backing UK-based singer Jenson Bloomer and Austrian singer Dennis Jale and his band, mostly playing music from Elvis Presley's catalogue. They have also backed Greg Page of the Wiggles for two solo albums and some live concerts.

However, after the 30th anniversary concert in 2007, Scheff departed the band and was replaced on tour by Norbert Putnam and Nathan East. Wilkinson died on January 11, 2013, from cancer, at the age of 67. Putnam and East departed the band in 2013. The TCB Band currently continues to tour backing Dennis Jale and his band. In 2019, for the first time since 2014, the TCB Band performed a new Elvis: The Concert-style show, alongside the Royal Philharmonic Orchestra, combining elements from the 2016-2018 Presley/Philharmonic tours with the old 1997-2014 TCB Band tours; however, no further tours with the TCB Band members were booked after this point. Despite this, the TCB Band (Burton, Hardin, and Tutt) performed at the Elvis: The Concert show that year during Elvis Week, alongside "other veterans" of Elvis Presley's 1970s-era touring group.

The most recent TCB Band performance took place in August 2022, as part of Elvis Week 2022, when Scheff reunited with Hardin, with both performing at two events: "All the King's Men", a jam session and storytelling event (which also featured drummer Gene Chrisman of the Memphis Boys, who had recorded with Elvis Presley in 1969), and a virtual Elvis: The Concert-style (titled Elvis Presley In Concert) show that closes the week's festivities annually. (The second event also included Terry Blackwood, formerly of The Imperials, and Larry Strickland, formerly of J.D. Sumner & The Stamps Quartet.) Hardin and Scheff also spoke at the "Conversations on Elvis" event about their time working with Elvis. Burton was due to join them for all three events but was sidelined due to health issues, including testing positive for the coronavirus shortly before the event.

== Members ==
=== Current ===
- James Burton — lead guitar (1969–1977, 1979, 1981, 1987, 1997–present); vocals (1979)
- Glen D. Hardin — piano, keyboards (1970–1976, 1979, 1981, 1987, 1997–present)

=== Former ===
- John Wilkinson — rhythm guitar (1969–1977, August 16, 2002; died 2013)
- Jerry Scheff — bass, double bass (1969–1973, 1975–1977, 1979, 1987, 1997–2011, 2022)
- Larry Muhoberac — keyboards, piano, electric piano (1969; died 2016)
- Ronnie Tutt — drums (1969–1977, 1979, 1981, 1987, 1997–2021); vocals (1979) (died 2021)
- Bob Lanning — drums (1970)
- Eddie Graham — percussion (1970–1971)
- Jerome 'Stump' Monroe — drums (1971, 1975; June 24, 1977; died 2026)
- Emory Gordy Jr. – bass, rhythm guitar, keyboards (1973, 1979, 1981)
- Duke Bardwell — bass (1974–1975; died 2026)
- David Briggs — electric piano, clavinet, piano (1975–1977; died 2025)
- Shane Keister — piano, Moog synthesizer (1976)
- Tony Brown — piano, organ (1976–1977)
- Larrie Londin — drums (March 1976, June 25–26, 1977; died 1992)
- Bobby Ogdin — electric piano, clavinet, piano (1977)
- Tony Smith — rhythm guitar (1997–2007)
- Norbert Putnam — bass (2009–2013)

=== Recurring guests ===
- Nathan East — bass (2009–2013)
- Paul Leim – drums (2021–present; occasional substitute for or second drummer alongside Ronnie Tutt, 1997-2012)

== Discography ==
=== Studio album ===
- The TCB Band (recorded in 1978, but never released until it was leaked on sale)
1. "Mystery Train" (Ronnie on lead vocals)
2. "Hound Dog" (Ronnie on lead vocals)
3. "That's Alright Mama" (James on lead vocals)
4. "Jailhouse Rock" (Ronnie on lead vocals)
5. "Suspicious Minds" (Ronnie on lead vocals)
6. "Burnin' Love" (Ronnie on lead vocals)
7. "Love Me" (Ronnie on lead vocals)
8. "Little Sister" (Ronnie on lead vocals)
9. "Heartbreak Hotel" (James on lead vocals)
10. "Can't Help Falling in Love" (Ronnie on lead vocals)

=== With Elvis Presley ===
Several members of the band also contributed to some of Presley's soundtracks and studio albums during his lifetime.

- From Memphis to Vegas / From Vegas to Memphis (1969) [Elvis In Person at the International Hotel]
- On Stage (1970)
- That's the Way It Is (1970)
- As Recorded at Madison Square Garden (1972)
- Aloha from Hawaii via Satellite (1973)
- Elvis Recorded Live on Stage in Memphis (1974)
- Today (1975)
- From Elvis Presley Boulevard, Memphis, Tennessee (1976)
- Moody Blue (1977)
- Elvis In Concert (1977)
- Elvis Aron Presley (box set) (1980)
- The Alternate Aloha (1988)
- An Afternoon in the Garden (1997)
- Live 1969 (box set) (2019)
- Elvis on Tour (box set) (2022/2023)

=== With others ===
Members of the band have also worked in various configurations with other musicians not listed below.

- Tony Sheridan and The Elvis Presley TCB Band (with Tony Sheridan, 1981)
- "Sedona" (with Donna Loren, 1982)
- A Black and White Night Live (with Roy Orbison and Friends, 1989)
- One Night of Sin (with Big Fat Snake and The Sweet Inspirations, 2003)
- Taking Care of Country (with Greg Page, 2005)
- Aloha from Sweden (with Maarten Jensen and The Sweet Inspirations, 2006)
- Nashville (with Dennis Jale, 2010)
- Let It Be Me (with Greg Page, 2012)
- Live at the Metropol (with Dennis Jale and Terry Blackwood's Imperials, 2019)
- "What's Going On" (with Dennis Jale and Friends, 2022)
