= An Afternoon in the Garden =

Live album by Elvis Presley
- Released: March 25, 1997
- Recorded: June 10, 1972
- Venue: Madison Square Garden, New York City, NY
- Genre: Rock
- Length: 60:49
- Label: RCA Records
- Producer: Ernst Mikael Jorgensen; Roger Semon

Elvis Presley chronology
Elvis 56 (1996)	An Afternoon in the Garden (1997)	Greatest Jukebox Hits (1997)

Professional ratings
Review scores
Source	Rating
AllMusic	2.5/5 stars

An Afternoon in the Garden is a live musical album recorded by American singer and musician Elvis Presley at Madison Square Garden on June 10, 1972. The album was released by RCA Records on the 25th anniversary of the concert in 1997 and on March 8, 2018, received an RIAA Gold Record certification for 500,000 copies sold.

== Content ==
During the weekend of June 9 through June 11, 1972, Elvis Presley gave his first concerts in New York City; he had performed on television in the 1950s and recorded at studios in the city (both while backed by his original band, The Blue Moon Boys and often also by the gospel quartet The Jordanaires on backing vocals), but had never performed in a concert venue before a paying audience. For these shows, Presley was backed by The TCB Band, who had backed him live (and occasionally in the studio as well) since 1969, as well as by backing vocalists J.D. Sumner and The Stamps Quartet (also a gospel group), The Sweet Inspirations (an R&B, soul, and gospel vocal group), and soprano Kathy Westmoreland.

Four shows in total were scheduled: three for the evenings of Friday, Saturday, and Sunday, with a matinee performance on Saturday afternoon as well. Engineers from RCA Records taped the two Saturday concerts, the results of the evening show released a mere eight days later on Elvis: As Recorded at Madison Square Garden, while the tapes for the afternoon show stayed in the vaults until a few months before the twenty-fifth anniversary of the concerts.

The track "I Can't Stop Loving You" had been released previously in 1977 as the sole unissued track on Welcome to My World, and the tracks "Reconsider Baby" and "I'll Remember You" had been previously released on disc five of the seventies box set.

== Track listing ==
No.	Title	Writer(s)	Notes	Length
1.	"Introduction: Also Sprach Zarathustra"	Richard Strauss		1:19
2.	"That's All Right"	Arthur Crudup		2:21
3.	"Proud Mary"	John Fogerty		2:45
4.	"Never Been to Spain"	Hoyt Axton		3:35
5.	"You Don't Have to Say You Love Me"	Vicki Wickham, Simon Napier-Bell, Pino Donaggio, Vito Pallavicini		2:07
6.	"Until It's Time for You to Go"	Buffy Sainte-Marie		2:32
7.	"You've Lost That Lovin' Feelin'"	Barry Mann, Cynthia Weil, Phil Spector		4:22
8.	"Polk Salad Annie"	Tony Joe White		3:10
9.	"Love Me"	Jerry Leiber and Mike Stoller		1:40
10.	"All Shook Up"	Otis Blackwell and Elvis Presley		1:11
11.	"Heartbreak Hotel"	Mae Axton, Tommy Durden, Elvis Presley		1:45
12.	"(Let Me Be Your) Teddy Bear" / "Don't Be Cruel"	Kal Mann and Bernie Lowe / Otis Blackwell and Elvis Presley		1:56
13.	"Love Me Tender"	Vera Matson and Elvis Presley		1:39
14.	"Blue Suede Shoes"	Carl Perkins		1:07
15.	"Reconsider Baby"	Lowell Fulson	Originally issued on Walk a Mile in My Shoes (RCA 66670-2) on October 10, 1995.	2:42
16.	"Hound Dog"	Jerry Leiber and Mike Stoller		2:06
17.	"I'll Remember You"	Kui Lee	Originally issued on Walk a Mile in My Shoes (RCA 66670-2) on October 10, 1995.	2:30
18.	"Suspicious Minds"	Mark James		4:46
19.	"Introductions By Elvis"			1:26
20.	"For the Good Times"	Kris Kristofferson		3:09
21.	"An American Trilogy"	Mickey Newbury		4:41
22.	"Funny How Time Slips Away"	Willie Nelson		2:50
23.	"I Can't Stop Loving You"	Don Gibson	Originally issued on Welcome to My World (APL1 2274) on March 17, 1977, which reached No. 44 on the Billboard 200.	2:21
24.	"Can't Help Falling in Love"	Luigi Creatore, Hugo Peretti, George David Weiss		2:14

== Personnel ==
- Elvis Presley – lead vocals; acoustic rhythm guitar on "That's All Right"
- James Burton – lead guitar
- John Wilkinson – electric rhythm guitar
- Charlie Hodge – harmony and backing vocals, acoustic rhythm guitar, water, scarves
- Glen Hardin – piano
- Jerry Scheff – bass
- Ronnie Tutt – drums
- J.D. Sumner & The Stamps Quartet (Ed Enoch, Bill Baize, Richard Sterban, Donnie Sumner) – backing vocals
- Kathy Westmoreland – backing vocals
- The Sweet Inspirations (Estelle Brown, Sylvia Shemwell, Myrna Smith) – backing vocals
- Joe Guercio – conductor
- The Joe Malin Orchestra

== Charts ==
=== Album ===
Year	Chart	Peak position
1997	Dutch Top 100 Albums	61
2011	US Billboard 200	85

=== Certifications and sales ===
Region	Certification	Sales/shipments
United States (RIAA)	Gold	500,000
