= Bob Lanning =

American drummer (born 1948)

- Also known as: Bob Lanning
- Born: Robert Lanning; April 4, 1948 (age 77); Miami Shores, Florida, United States
- Genres: Rock, pop, country
- Occupations: Musician, session musician
- Instrument: Drums
- Years active: 1960s–present
- Website: boblanning.com

Bob Lanning (born April 4, 1948) is an American drummer, best known for his work with Elvis Presley in 1970 as a member of his TCB Band.

Lanning worked as his drummer during Presley's 1970 engagement at the International Hotel in Las Vegas, Nevada. Lanning played on Presley's 1970 live album, On Stage, including Presley's hit single The Wonder of You as well as album favorites See See Rider, Release Me, Sweet Caroline, Polk Salad Annie, Proud Mary, Walk a Mile in My Shoes and Let It Be Me. Lanning also accompanied Elvis on drums during Presley's six attendance-record–breaking concert appearances at the Houston Astrodome in 1970.

Jerry Scheff recommended Lanning to Presley when he was searching for a new drummer in late 1969 when original band drummer Ron Tutt became unavailable because of other engagements. At the time, Lanning got the job because Presley loved his style of drumming. There were supposed to audition nine drummers in October 1969, but the moment Presley heard Lanning's drumming, he immediately said: “Looks like we got our drummer!”. Lanning replaced Ron Tutt in October 1969, however Tutt came back to the line up in August 1970 when he became available again. Lanning met Presley for the last time in 1972, before his death in 1977. Presley told Lanning that he enjoyed the On Stage album very much. Lanning thought that Presley sounded like he felt bad, he said, “I want you to know that you did a good job for me”. Presley also told Lanning that he would be calling him, “I’ll be calling you, Bobby”.

After the end of cooperation with Elvis Presley, Lanning has mostly worked as a session drummer in Los Angeles; he has played recording sessions and concerts for many artists.

Lanning's mother was singer Roberta Sherwood.
