= Roberta Sherwood =

American singer and actress (1913–1999)

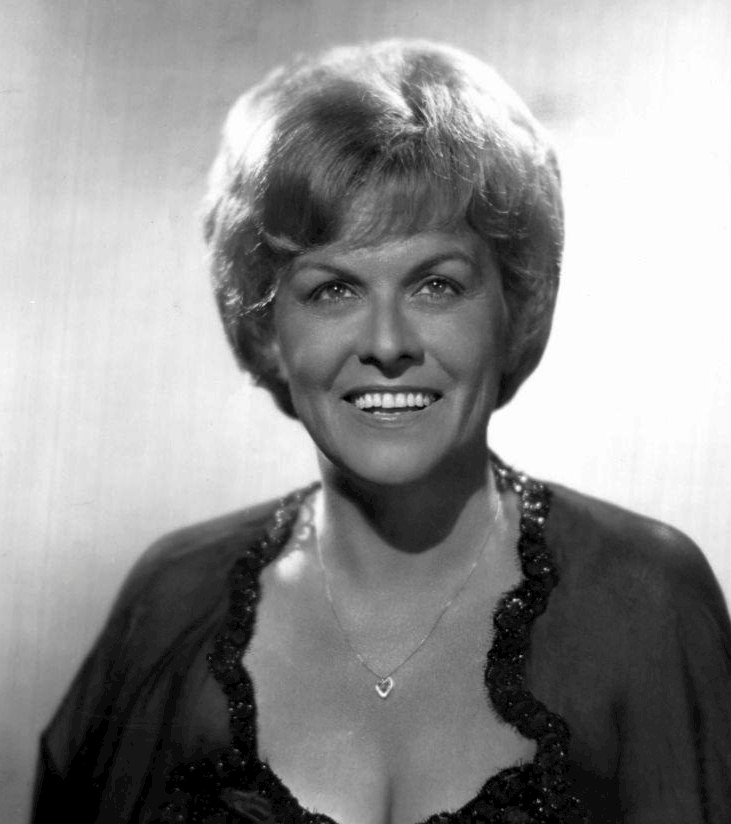
- Sherwood in 1963

Background information
- Born: Roberta Sherwood; July 1, 1913; St. Louis, Missouri, U.S.
- Died: July 5, 1999 (aged 86) Sherman Oaks, California, U.S.
- Genres: Torch song
- Occupation: Nightclub performer
- Years active: 1956–1980s
- Labels: Decca, Happy Tiger

Roberta Sherwood (July 1, 1913 – July 5, 1999) was an American singer, notable in part for her sudden rise to fame at the age of 43.

== Early life and rise to stardom ==
Roberta's father Robert Sherwood was the manager of a traveling minstrel show; she and her sister Anne were raised on the road after their mother died. Roberta started performing in vaudeville at age 11, and the sisters soon became a vaudeville and nightclub act. In 1932 they met Broadway actor Don Lanning, who mentored Roberta and ultimately married her in 1938. They both abandoned careers to settle in Miami, opening a small nightclub where she continued to perform. After the restaurant lost its lease, they got a concession to operate a hotel lounge. In 1953 Don was diagnosed with lung cancer and lost their concession. After an attempt to start another nightclub failed, Sherwood began to seriously pursue her career.

For several years she met with little success. A trip to Las Vegas, where she stayed with family friend Gene Austin, failed to advance her career. In September 1955 a chance meeting led to a nightclub gig in a Miami Beach club, and in January 1956 she suddenly became a success. The comedian Red Buttons became a fan and brought columnist Walter Winchell to see her; he gave her rave reviews. Soon she was performing in clubs nationwide and had a contract with Decca Records. She was profiled in Life magazine in October. A November 1956 Billboard poll of DJs picked her as the 19th most popular "album artist" and #8 on a list of "Most Promising Female Vocalists".

== Style ==
Sherwood was usually described as a torch singer; she appeared on stage in a sweater and glasses, and used a cymbal held in her hand for accompaniment. Life described her as "flashy, richly sentimental, as unsubtle as her crashing cymbal and as unpretentious as her $49.50 dress".

== Later career ==
Sherwood's recordings were not tremendous successes; her only charting hit was "Lazy River", which hit No. 57 on the Hot 100 in 1956 – but she continued to have a singing and recording career into the 1970s. Her recordings apparently did well in jukeboxes, which perhaps explains why they continued to appear. She appeared four times on The Ed Sullivan Show and on many other variety shows of the late 1950s. She appeared on The Jackie Gleason Show, as a singer. She was interviewed by Edward R. Murrow on Person to Person.

In the 1960s she appeared once on Joey Bishop's sitcom and once on his talk show. She also appeared with her sons on a memorable 1964 Lucy Show with Lucille Ball as well as The Donna Reed Show's 4th-season episode "Donna Meets Roberta" (May 1962). Todon Productions, Donna Reed's production company, used the end of that episode to introduce the pilot of Sherwood's own show, which co-starred Gale Gordon but never aired. She continued to headline nightclubs into the late 1970s and toured in a variety show with Cyd Charisse, Anna Maria Alberghetti, and others in 1980.

Sherwood was an occasional actress, appearing in a 1957 TV movie about the early life of George M. Cohan entitled "Mr. Broadway," in which she co-starred with Mickey Rooney, James Dunn, Gloria DeHaven and June Havoc, sporadically in the 1960s (including as the housekeeper in The Courtship of Eddie's Father), and as late as 1978 had a bit part in an episode of The Incredible Hulk playing "Mrs. Waverly" in an episode titled "Earthquakes Happen".

== Honors ==
She received a Lifetime Achievement award from the Film Welfare League in 1985.

== Last years ==
She continued performing in the Los Angeles area well into the early 1990s and recorded a final album, "The Tribute Collection", in 1992, produced by her son Don.

She is buried at Forest Lawn Memorial Park (Hollywood Hills).

== Family ==
Her husband Don, who never made a complete recovery from his cancer, died in 1960. The couple had three sons, Don, Robert and Jerry Lanning, who all appeared with her in episodes of The Lucy Show and The Donna Reed Show. A retrospective CD of her first two Decca albums is currently available on Sepia Records.

Don Lanning Jr., her eldest son, was an actor known for The Donna Reed Show (1958), An Evening with… (1965), and Playboy’s Penthouse (1959). He went on to continue to perform with his mother, work in music publishing, produce his mother’s final album, The Tribute Collection (1992), and work in real estate. He had 3 children, Roberta’s grandchildren, (Roberta, Don, and Erika).

Her youngest son, Robert, also known as Bob Lanning, became a Los Angeles session drummer; but he is best known for his work with Elvis Presley as his drummer during Presley's 1970 engagement at the International Hotel in Las Vegas, Nevada. Lanning played on Presley's 1970 live album, On Stage, including Presley's hit single "The Wonder of You" as well as album favorites "See See Rider", "Release Me", "Sweet Caroline", "Polk Salad Annie", "Proud Mary", "Walk a Mile in My Shoes", and "Let It Be Me". Bob Lanning also accompanied Elvis on drums during Presley's six attendance-record–breaking concert appearances at the Houston Astrodome in 1970. By August 1970, Lanning was replaced on drums in Elvis's rhythm section by Ron Tutt.

Her middle son, Jerry Lanning, became an actor known for both his stage and TV work, appearing early on as a singer of cowboy songs on the Donna Reed Show episode called "Big Star" and as young rock and roll singer Randy Twizzle in the episode "The Twizzle" on The Dick Van Dyke Show. He also had roles on soap operas such as Guiding Light, Search for Tomorrow and Texas.

== Albums ==
- Introducing Roberta Sherwood 1956 (Decca)
- Show Stoppers 1957 (Decca)
- I Gotta Right to Sing 1957 (Decca)
- Country Songs for City People 1959 (Decca)
- Look for the Silver Lining 1959 (Decca)
- Clap Your Hands 1959 (Decca)
- Get Away From Those Swingin' Doors – 1960 (Decca)
- Live Performance – 1961 live album (Decca)
- My Golden Favorites – 1961 (Decca)
- You're Nobody 'til Somebody Loves You – 1963 (Decca)
- Gone Gospel (also issued as Gospel Goes Pop) – 1963 (ABC-Paramount)
- On Stage – 1963 live album (Harmon)
- Fly Me to the Moon (with Marilyn Maxwell) – 1964 (Design)
- The Country Sound – With Soul – 1964 (ABC-Paramount)
- Songs Everybody Knows – 1964 (Decca)
- You're Nobody Till Somebody Loves You – 1965 (Decca)
- Hamp's Portrait of a Woman (1966, Lionel Hampton; Sherwood is featured on two tracks) – (Glad-Hamp)
- This Good Life – 1971 (King)
- I Left My Heart in San Francisco (with Jacki Fontaine) – (International Award)
