= The Courtship of Eddie's Father =

The Courtship of Eddie's Father may refer to:

- The Courtship of Eddie's Father (film), a 1963 American film
- The Courtship of Eddie's Father (TV series), an American TV series than ran from 1969 to 1972
