= As Recorded at Madison Square Garden =

Elvis As Recorded at Madison Square Garden

Live album by Elvis Presley
- Released: June 1972
- Recorded: June 10, 1972
- Venues: Madison Square Garden; New York City, New York
- Genres: Rock and roll, country, rhythm and blues, pop
- Length: 52:30
- Label: RCA Victor

Elvis Presley chronology
He Touched Me (1972)	Elvis As Recorded at Madison Square Garden (1972)	Burning Love and Hits from His Movies, Volume 2 (1972)

Professional ratings
Review scores
Source	Rating
AllMusic	3/5 stars
Christgau's Record Guide	C
MusicHound	2/5 stars
The Rolling Stone Album Guide	2/5 stars
Rough Guides	3/5 stars

Elvis: As Recorded at Madison Square Garden is a live album by American singer and musician Elvis Presley, released in late June 1972 by RCA Records. It peaked at No. 11 on the Top 200 US Billboard albums chart on September 9, 1972. Recorded at the Madison Square Garden arena in New York City on Saturday June 10, 1972, the concert, and the subsequent album, were promoted as being Presley's first live concerts in the Big Apple since the 1950s.

The album was certified Gold on August 4, 1972, Platinum on May 20, 1988, double-Platinum on March 27, 1992, and triple-Platinum on July 15, 1999, by the RIAA. Along with Aloha from Hawaii: Via Satellite it ranked as one of the best selling live albums of the 1970s.

== Content ==
The entire set was issued on a single LP, and appeared at retail in swift fashion, about three weeks after the concert. Elvis' subsequent full-priced album would be another complete live concert recording—with some song repetition—this time in Honolulu: Aloha from Hawaii: Via Satellite.

The concert included on the 1972 New York album was the evening show on June 10. RCA Records also captured the afternoon performance, but except for "I Can't Stop Loving You", which appeared on the 1977 compilation, Welcome to My World, and "I'll Remember You" and "Reconsider Baby" on 1983's Elvis: A Legendary Performer Volume 3, the entire set remained unreleased until 1997's An Afternoon in the Garden.

Interestingly, 1970s Presley drummer Ronnie Tutt wrongly claimed in a 2009 interview for the BBC documentary Elvis in Vegas that Colonel Tom Parker, Presley's manager, sped up the mixes so that more tracks could be on the 1972 live album, increasing the publishing royalties.

== Reissues ==
On November 13, 2012, RCA/Legacy re-released the live concert album on two vinyl discs in the same format as Aloha From Hawaii: Via Satellite and Elvis In Concert live concert albums. In 2013, RCA/Legacy, through HDTracks.com, released a high-resolution remastering of the concert in 24-bit/96 kHz.

== Track listing ==
Side one
No.	Title	Writer(s)	Length
1.	"Introduction: Also Sprach Zarathustra" (theme from 2001: A Space Odyssey)	Richard Strauss	1:06
2.	"That's All Right"	Arthur "Big Boy" Crudup	2:14
3.	"Proud Mary"	John Fogerty	2:35
4.	"Never Been to Spain"	Hoyt Axton	3:36
5.	"You Don't Have to Say You Love Me"	Pino Donaggio, Simon Napier-Bell, Vito Pallavicini, Vicki Wickham	2:03
6.	"You've Lost That Lovin' Feelin'"	Barry Mann, Phil Spector, Cynthia Weil	4:11
7.	"Polk Salad Annie"	Tony Joe White	2:57
8.	"Love Me"	Jerry Leiber and Mike Stoller	1:38
9.	"All Shook Up"	Otis Blackwell, Elvis Presley	1:04
10.	"Heartbreak Hotel"	Mae Boren Axton, Tommy Durden, Elvis Presley	1:44
11.	"Medley: (Let Me Be Your) Teddy Bear" / "Don't Be Cruel"	Kal Mann, Bernie Lowe / Otis Blackwell, Elvis Presley	1:50
12.	"Love Me Tender"	Vera Matson, Elvis Presley	1:38

Side two
No.	Title	Writer(s)	Length
1.	"The Impossible Dream"	Joe Darion, Mitch Leigh	2:35
2.	"Introductions by Elvis"	—	1:27
3.	"Hound Dog"	Jerry Leiber and Mike Stoller	1:55
4.	"Suspicious Minds"	Mark James	4:23
5.	"For the Good Times"	Kris Kristofferson	3:03
6.	"An American Trilogy"	Mickey Newbury	4:28
7.	"Funny How Time Slips Away"	Willie Nelson	2:41
8.	"I Can't Stop Loving You"	Don Gibson	2:37
9.	"Can't Help Falling in Love"	Luigi Creatore, Hugo Peretti, George David Weiss	2:34
10.	"End Theme"	—	0:55

== Personnel ==
- Elvis Presley – vocals
- James Burton – lead guitar
- John Wilkinson – rhythm guitar
- Ronnie Tutt – drums
- Jerry Scheff – bass
- Glen D. Hardin – piano
- The Sweet Inspirations (Estelle Brown, Sylvia Shemwell, Myrna Smith) – background vocals
- Kathy Westmoreland – background vocals
- J.D. Sumner & The Stamps (Ed Enoch, Bill Baize, Richard Sterban, Donnie Sumner) – background vocals
- Joe Guercio – conductor
- The Joe Malin Orchestra
- A&R/Producers: Harry Jenkins, Joan Deary, Felton Jarvis
- Al Pachuki and Dick Baxter – recording engineers
- Dick Baxter and Larry Schnapf – mastering and supervision
