= Roy Orbison and Friends: A Black and White Night =

Television special broadcast 1988

- DVD cover
- Genre: Concert film
- Directed by: Tony Mitchell
- Starring: Roy Orbison; TCB Band; Jackson Browne; Bruce Springsteen; T Bone Burnett; Elvis Costello k.d. lang Bonnie Raitt; Tom Waits; Jennifer Warnes and others
- Country of origin: United States
- Original language: English

Production
- Executive producer: Barbara Orbison
- Producer: Tony Mitchell
- Cinematography: Tony Mitchell
- Editors: Sean Fullan, Mitchell Sinoway
- Running time: 55 minutes (TV version); 93 min (A Black and White Night 30)
- Production company: Image Entertainment

Original release
- Network: Cinemax
- Release: 3 January 1988

Roy Orbison and Friends: A Black and White Night is a 1988 Cinemax television special originally broadcast on January 3, 1988, presenting a performance by singer/songwriter Roy Orbison and the TCB Band with special guests including Bruce Springsteen, k.d. lang and others. The special was filmed entirely in black and white. After the broadcast, the concert was released on VHS and Laserdisc, and a live album was released in 1989.

== Background ==
The special consisted of a performance of many of Orbison's hits at the Ambassador Hotel's Cocoanut Grove nightclub in Los Angeles, filmed on September 30, 1987, approximately fourteen months before his death. Three songs ("Blue Bayou", "Claudette", and "Blue Angel") were filmed but not included in the original broadcast due to time constraints.

Orbison's backing band was the TCB Band, which accompanied Elvis Presley from 1969 until his death in 1977: Glen Hardin on piano, James Burton on lead guitar, Jerry Scheff on bass, and Ronnie Tutt on drums. Male background vocalists, some of whom also joined in on guitar and keyboards, included Bruce Springsteen, Tom Waits, Elvis Costello, Jackson Browne, JD Souther and Steven Soles. The female background vocalists were k.d. lang, Jennifer Warnes, and Bonnie Raitt. During the end credits, several of the band members are shown talking about how Orbison influenced them. Several other celebrity admirers of Orbison were in the audience, including David Lynch, Billy Idol, Patrick Swayze, Billy Bob Thornton, Sandra Bernhard and Kris Kristofferson.

The following morning at 7:42am, a violent 5.9 magnitude earthquake struck the Whittier section of Los Angeles. Several chandeliers in the ballroom had collapsed on the master film and videotape recordings that had captured the performance. When the wreckage was cleared, no damage had been done.

Soon after the release on VHS and LaserDisc, a bootleg CD entitled A Black and White Night, Roy Orbison in Concert with the Billion Dollar Band surfaced. This CD, which came before any official release of the concert, has the same 15 songs in the same order as the original VHS/Laserdisc release and catalogue number RO.LA.87, referring to the artist, place and year of the recording. The concert was officially released by Virgin Records in 1989 as A Black & White Night Live. After Orbison's death, his family provided the video to public television stations to air during their fund-raising campaigns.

== Releases ==
The concert has been released in several home video formats, including VHS, Laserdisc, DVD, HD DVD, and Blu-ray. The soundtrack has been released on CD, SACD that features both Stereo and Multi Channel Mixes, 12" vinyl LP, and DVD-Audio. The Laserdisc release follows the tracklist of the broadcast and VHS, while the DVD release contains the two previously unreleased songs "Blue Bayou" and "Claudette". The HD DVD, released in 2007, and the Blu-ray, released in September 2008, include those two songs as well as the previously unreleased song "Blue Angel" as a bonus track.

The DVD features standard definition 480i video in a standard 4:3 aspect ratio and three lossy soundtracks: Dolby Digital 2.0 Stereo, Dolby Digital 5.1, and DTS 5.1

The Blu-ray features high definition 1080i video in a widescreen 16:9 aspect ratio and two lossless soundtracks: DTS-HD Master Audio 5.1 and LPCM 2.0

- Also features the lossy soundtrack Dolby Digital 5.1 and, by extension, the lossy DTS core of the DTS-HD MA

The HD DVD features high definition 1080i video in a widescreen 16:9 aspect ratio and at least one lossless soundtrack: Dolby TrueHD 5.1 Surround

February 24, 2017 saw the release of a re-edited 30th Anniversary Version of the Concert retitled "Roy Orbison Black & White Night 30," that contains footage that is not available on the out-of-print Blu-Ray and HD DVD releases that Image Entertainment distributed in 2007/2008. The sequencing has been corrected to represent the actual Live song order at the concert. There is also new bonus footage with alternative versions of various songs that also can be viewed as part of the main concert. The audio is English Dolby TrueHD 5.1 and English LPCM 2.0. Optional English SDH subtitles are not provided.

- Bonus Rehearsal and Interview Footage - presented here is the only known surviving footage of the Black & White Night rehearsal. The footage also contains clips from archival interviews that were conducted at the same time. In English, not subtitled. (38 min).
- Photo Gallery - original production stills. (4 min).
- Booklet - 20-page illustrated booklet. Packaging photos are included at the bottom of this review. (Please see screenshots).
- CD - the entire show presented on a bonus CD.

== Certifications ==
Region	Certification	Certified units/sales
Australia (ARIA)	11× Platinum	165,000^{^}
Canada (Music Canada)	Platinum	10,000^{^}
United Kingdom (BPI)	Platinum	50,000^{*}
United States (RIAA)	Gold	50,000^{^}
^{*} Sales figures based on certification alone.^{^} Shipments figures based on certification alone.

== Soundtrack ==
Black & White Night

Live album by Roy Orbison
- Released: February 3, 1989
- Recorded: September 30, 1987
- Genres: Rock'n'roll, rockabilly, country
- Length: 61:40
- Label: Orbison
- Producer: T Bone Burnett

Roy Orbison chronology
Combo Concert: 1965 Holland (1998)	Black & White Night (1989)	Live (1998)

Professional ratings
Review scores
Source	Rating
AllMusic	4/5 stars

According to the authorised biography of Roy Orbison, A Black & White Night Live, the live album, was compiled and released posthumously from the television special in October 1989, and included the song "Blue Bayou" which was cut from the original broadcast for time limitations. However it did not include the songs "Blue Angel" or "Claudette" which were also cut from the original broadcast for the same reason.

The live album has been released several times in different formats. On February 24, 2017, a 30th anniversary edition, titled Black & White Night 30, was released. The edition has been expanded, re-edited, and remastered, and it is available both as a CD/DVD and a CD/Blu-ray set.

=== Track listing ===
All tracks composed by Roy Orbison and Joe Melson, except where indicated.

1. "Only the Lonely"
2. "Dream Baby" (Cindy Walker)
3. "Blue Bayou" (not on original video release)
4. "The Comedians" (Elvis Costello)
5. "Ooby Dooby" (Dick Penner, Wade Moore)
6. "Leah" (Roy Orbison)
7. "Running Scared"
8. "Uptown"
9. "In Dreams" (Orbison)
10. "Crying"
11. "Candy Man" (Fred Neil, Beverly "Ruby" Ross)
12. "Go Go Go (Down the Line)" (Orbison)
13. "Mean Woman Blues" (Claude Demetrius)
14. "(All I Can Do is) Dream You" (Billy Burnette, David Malloy)
15. "Claudette" (not on original 1989 LP) (Orbison)
16. "It's Over" (Roy Orbison, Bill Dees)
17. "Oh, Pretty Woman" (Orbison, Bill Dees)
18. "Blue Angel" (not on original 1989 LP)

=== Black & White Night 30 track listing ===
1. "Intro"
2. "Only the Lonely"
3. "Leah"
4. "In Dreams"
5. "Crying"
6. "Uptown"
7. "The Comedians"
8. "Blue Angel"
9. "It's Over"
10. "Running Scared"
11. "Dream Baby (How Long Must I Dream)"
12. "Mean Woman Blues"
13. "Candy Man"
14. "Ooby Dooby"
15. "Blue Bayou"
16. "Go Go Go (Down the Line)"
17. "(All I Can Do Is) Dream You"
18. "Claudette"
19. "Oh, Pretty Woman" (Alternative Version)*
20. "Oh, Pretty Woman"

The Secret Post Show (Alternative Versions)

21. "(All I Can Do Is) Dream You" (Alternative Version)*
22. "Comedians" (Alternative Version)*
23. "Candy Man" (Alternative Version)*
24. "Claudette" (Alternative Version)*
25. "Uptown" (Alternative Version)*

== Personnel ==
- Roy Orbison: lead vocals, guitar, harmonica
- T Bone Burnett: acoustic guitar; musical director

TCB Band:

- Glen D. Hardin: piano
- James Burton: lead guitar
- Jerry Scheff: upright bass
- Ronnie Tutt: drums

Guest performers:

- Bruce Springsteen: guitar, vocals
- Elvis Costello: acoustic guitar, organ, harmonica
- Tom Waits: organ, acoustic guitar
- Michael Utley: keyboards
- Alex Acuña: percussion
- JD Souther: backing vocals; acoustic guitar; vocal arrangements
- Steven Soles: backing vocals
- Jackson Browne: backing vocals
- Bonnie Raitt: backing vocals
- k.d. lang: backing vocals
- Jennifer Warnes: backing vocals
- Ezra Klinger, Pavel Farkas, Christopher Reutinger, Carol Shive, Cynthia Morrow, Bobby Debow: violin
- Jimbo Ross, Peter Hatch: viola

== Production person ==
Lighting Designer: Lee Rose
