= On Stage (Elvis Presley album) =

Live album by Elvis Presley
- Released: June 23, 1970
- Recorded: August 22 and 25, 1969; February 17–19, 1970
- Venues: International Hotel, Las Vegas, Nevada
- Length: 31:57
- Label: RCA Victor

Elvis Presley chronology
Let's Be Friends (1970)	On Stage (1970)	Worldwide 50 Gold Award Hits Vol. 1 (1970)

Singles from On Stage
- 1. "The Wonder of You" b/w "Mama Liked the Roses" Released: April 20, 1970

Professional ratings
Review scores
Source	Rating
AllMusic	4/5 stars
MusicHound	3.5/5 stars
The Rolling Stone Album Guide	4/5 stars
Rough Guides	4/5 stars

On Stage (subtitled February, 1970) is a live album by American singer Elvis Presley, released by RCA Records in June 1970. It was recorded between February 17 and 19, 1970 and August 22 and 25, 1969 at the International Hotel, Las Vegas, Nevada. The album reached number 13 on both the Billboard 200 and country music charts. It was certified Gold on February 23, 1971, and Platinum on July 15, 1999, by the Recording Industry Association of America.

== Content ==
On Stage was an immediate follow up to From Memphis to Vegas/From Vegas to Memphis, which also featured live recordings. Unlike the previous release, however, this album focused on songs that were not, at the time, associated with Elvis Presley.

The album features the worldwide number one single "The Wonder of You", which topped both the United States Adult Contemporary tracks chart and the UK Singles Chart. Other selections include "See See Rider", "Yesterday", Tony Joe White's "Polk Salad Annie", Del Shannon's "Runaway", and a version of "Let It Be Me". "See See Rider" would go on to become Presley's frequent introductory number at his concerts up to his last performance at the (now defunct) Market Square Arena in Indianapolis, Indiana on June 26, 1977, while "Polk Salad Annie" also became a regular part of his repertoire. The album is notable for not showing Presley's name anywhere on the cover.

On January 8, 2010, it was announced that a Legacy Edition would be released, to follow the Legacy Edition release of From Elvis in Memphis in the spring of 2010.

== Track listing ==
=== Original release ===
Side one
No.	Title	Writer(s)	Recording date	Length
1.	"See See Rider"	Traditional	February 17, 1970	3:08
2.	"Release Me"	Eddie Miller, Dub Williams, Robert Yount	February 18, 1970	3:11
3.	"Sweet Caroline"	Neil Diamond	February 18, 1970	2:43
4.	"Runaway"	Del Shannon, Max Crook	August 25, 1969	2:47
5.	"The Wonder Of You"	Baker Knight	February 19, 1970	2:38

Side two
No.	Title	Writer(s)	Recording date	Length
1.	"Polk Salad Annie"	Tony Joe White	February 19, 1970	5:33
2.	"Yesterday"	Lennon–McCartney	August 25, 1969	2:27
3.	"Proud Mary"	John Fogerty	February 17, 1970	2:47
4.	"Walk a Mile in My Shoes"	Joe South	February 18, 1970	2:59
5.	"Let It Be Me"	Gilbert Bécaud, Mann Curtis, Pierre Delanoë	February 17, 1970	3:39

=== Extended Version ===
In 1999 BMG reissued the album with six additional songs (tracks 10–15).
No.	Title	Writer(s)	Recording date	Length
1.	"See See Rider"	Traditional	February 17, 1970	3:08
2.	"Release Me"	Eddie Miller, Dub Williams, Robert Yount	February 18, 1970	3:11
3.	"Sweet Caroline"	Neil Diamond	February 18, 1970	2:43
4.	"Runaway"	Del Shannon, Max Crook	August 25, 1969	2:47
5.	"The Wonder of You"	Baker Knight	February 19, 1970	2:38
6.	"Polk Salad Annie"	Tony Joe White	February 19, 1970	5:33
7.	"Yesterday / Hey Jude"	Lennon–McCartney	August 25, 1969	4:39
8.	"Proud Mary"	John Fogerty	February 17, 1970	2:47
9.	"Walk a Mile in My Shoes"	Joe South	February 18, 1970	2:59
10.	"In The Ghetto"	Mac Davis	February 1970	2:45
11.	"Don't Cry Daddy"	Mac Davis	February 17, 1970	2:59
12.	"Kentucky Rain"	Eddie Rabbitt	February 17, 1970	3:53
13.	"I Can't Stop Loving You"	Don Gibson	February 19, 1970	2:21
14.	"Suspicious Minds"	Mark James	February 1970	5:04
15.	"Long Tall Sally"	Enotris Johnson, Robert Blackwell, Richard Penniman	February 1970	1:25
16.	"Let It Be Me"	Gilbert Bécaud, Mann Curtis, Pierre Delanoë	February 17, 1970	3:39

=== Legacy Edition ===
On March 23, 2010, the album was released in a two-disc Legacy Edition. All tracks on disc two were recorded August 23–26, 1969.

Disc one - On Stage
No.	Title	Length
1.	"See See Rider"	3:06
2.	"Release Me"	3:11
3.	"Sweet Caroline"	2:43
4.	"Runaway"	2:46
5.	"The Wonder of You"	2:34
6.	"Polk Salad Annie"	5:33
7.	"Yesterday"	2:27
8.	"Proud Mary"	2:47
9.	"Walk a Mile in My Shoes"	2:59
10.	"Let It Be Me"	3:39
11.	"Don't Cry Daddy" (recorded live at the International Hotel, Las Vegas, Nevada, February 18, 1970, dinner show)	2:38
12.	"Kentucky Rain" (recorded live at the International Hotel, Las Vegas, Nevada, February 16, 1970, dinner show)	3:20
13.	"Long Tall Sally" (recorded live at the International Hotel, Las Vegas, Nevada, February 18, 1970, midnight show)	1:32
14.	"The Wonder of You" (recorded live at the International Hotel, Las Vegas, Nevada, February 18, 1970, afternoon rehearsal)	6:57

Disc two - Elvis in Person at the International Hotel, Las Vegas, Nevada
No.	Title	Length
1.	"Blue Suede Shoes"	2:05
2.	"Johnny B. Goode"	2:20
3.	"All Shook Up"	2:07
4.	"Are You Lonesome Tonight?"	3:15
5.	"Hound Dog"	1:53
6.	"I Can't Stop Loving You"	3:19
7.	"My Babe"	2:10
8.	"Mystery Train" / "Tiger Man"	3:45
9.	"Words"	2:45
10.	"In the Ghetto"	2:56
11.	"Suspicious Minds"	7:45
12.	"Can't Help Falling in Love"	2:12
13.	"I Got a Woman" (previously unreleased; recorded live at the International Hotel Las Vegas, Nevada, August 23, 1969, dinner show)	2:39
14.	"Jailhouse Rock" / "Don't Be Cruel" (previously unreleased; recorded live at the International Hotel Las Vegas, Nevada, August 23, 1969, dinner show)	3:22
15.	"Heartbreak Hotel" (previously unreleased; recorded live at the International Hotel Las Vegas, Nevada, August 23, 1969, dinner show)	2:19
16.	"Baby, What Do You Want Me to Do" (previously unreleased; recorded live at the International Hotel Las Vegas, Nevada, August 23, 1969, dinner show)	3:32
17.	"Reconsider Baby" (previously unreleased; recorded live at the International Hotel Las Vegas, Nevada, August 23, 1969, midnight show)	3:17
18.	"Funny How Time Slips Away" (previously unreleased; recorded live at the International Hotel Las Vegas, Nevada, August 25, 1969, dinner show)	2:38

The album was arranged by Bergen White, Glen D. Hardin and Glen Spreen

== Personnel ==
Sourced from Keith Flynn’s access to RCA and AFM paperwork.

- Elvis Presley – vocals, electric guitar, acoustic guitar
- James Burton – electric lead guitar
- John Wilkinson − electric rhythm guitar
- Charlie Hodge − backing vocals, acoustic rhythm guitar
- Glen D. Hardin − keyboards except "Runaway" and "Yesterday"
- Larry Muhoberac − keyboards on "Runaway" and "Yesterday"
- Jerry Scheff – bass
- Bob Lanning − drums except "Runaway" and "Yesterday"
- Ron Tutt – drums on "Runaway" and "Yesterday"
- Eddie Graham − percussion
- The Imperials − backing vocals
- The Sweet Inspirations − backing vocals
- Bobby Morris and his Orchestra − orchestra

Overdubbed:

- Millie Kirkham, Mary Holladay, Ginger Holladay, Mary "Jeanie" Greene, Sandra Posey Robinson − additional backing vocals
- Dolores Edgin, June "Ricki" Page, Hurshel Wiginton, Joseph Babcock – additional backing vocals on "Runaway", "The Wonder of You", and "Yesterday"
- James Glaser – additional backing vocals on "The Wonder of You"
