= James Burton =

American guitarist (born 1939)

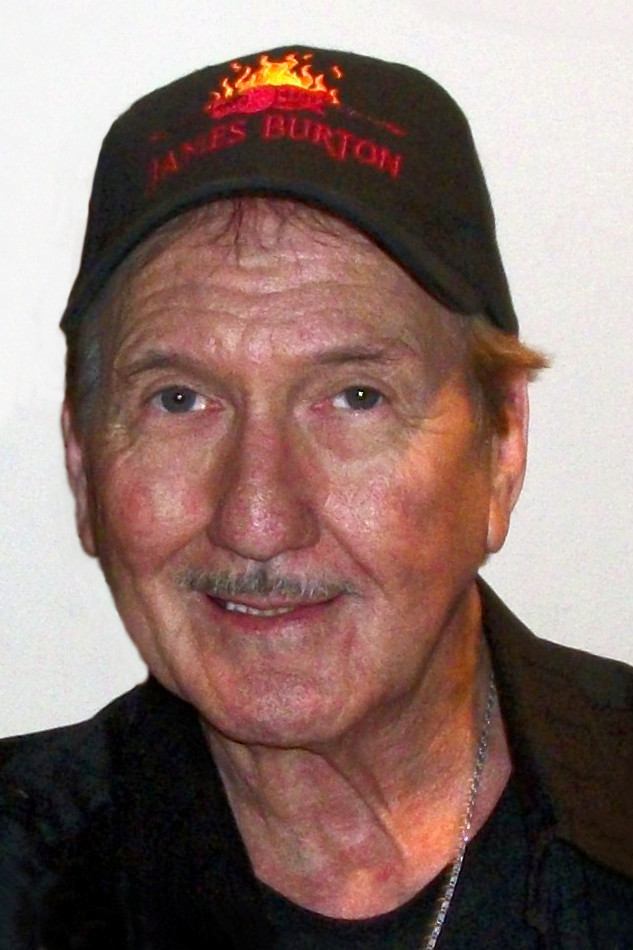
- Burton in 2010

Background information
- Born: James Edward Burton; August 21, 1939 (age 87); Dubberly, Louisiana, United States
- Genres: Rock and roll; rockabilly; country; country rock
- Occupation: Musician
- Instruments: Guitar, dobro
- Years active: 1952–present
- Website: james-burton.net

James Edward Burton (born August 21, 1939, in Dubberly, Louisiana, United States) is an American guitarist. A member of the Rock and Roll Hall of Fame since 2001 (his induction speech was given by longtime fan Keith Richards), Burton has also been recognized by the Rockabilly Hall of Fame and the Musicians Hall of Fame and Museum. He was elected into the Country Music Hall of Fame in 2024. Critic Mark Deming writes that "Burton has a well-deserved reputation as one of the finest guitar pickers in either country or rock ... Burton is one of the best guitar players to ever touch a fretboard." He is ranked number 24 in Rolling Stone list of 250 greatest guitarists of all time.

Since the 1950s, Burton has recorded and performed with an array of singers, including Bob Luman, Dale Hawkins, Rick Nelson, Elvis Presley (and was leader of Presley's TCB Band), The Everly Brothers, Johnny Cash, Merle Haggard, Glen Campbell, John Denver, Gram Parsons, Emmylou Harris, Lee Hazlewood, Judy Collins, Jerry Lee Lewis, Claude King, Elvis Costello, Joe Osborn, Roy Orbison, Joni Mitchell, Hoyt Axton, Townes Van Zandt, Steve Young, Vince Gill, and Suzi Quatro.

== Biography ==
=== Early life and career ===
Burton was born in Dubberly in south Webster Parish near Minden, Louisiana, to Guy M. Burton (1909–2001) and the former Lola Poland (1914–2011), a native of rural Fryeburg in Bienville Parish. She was the daughter of James and Althius Poland. Burton's wife is Louise Burton.

Self-taught, Burton began playing guitar during childhood. He was hired to be part of the staff band for the popular Louisiana Hayride radio show in Shreveport. While he was still a teenager, Burton left Shreveport for Los Angeles, where he joined Ricky Nelson's band. There, he made numerous recordings as a session musician. Burton created and played the guitar riff on Dale Hawkins 1957 hit song "Susie Q", a record that would become one of the Rock and Roll Hall of Fame's 500 Songs that Shaped Rock and Roll. He had originally written the song as an instrumental before Hawkins wrote lyrics for it; Burton never received credit or royalties for his contributions to "Susie Q".

=== With Ricky Nelson, work as a session musician, and Shindig! ===
Burton played guitar on the majority of Ricky Nelson's songs recorded during the first 11 years of Nelson's career, beginning with his premiere at Master Recorders in Hollywood on November 18, 1957, for the classic "Stood Up"/"Waitin' in School" rockabilly single. At this time, Burton was relegated to rhythm as Joe Maphis was still playing lead guitar for Nelson. Ricky Nelson's original (regular) band included Burton and double bassist James Kirkland; Kirkland was later replaced by Joe Osborn on electric bass.

Burton's first single as Nelson's lead guitarist was "Believe What You Say". In 1965 he started working on the television program Shindig! which curtailed his touring with Nelson. However, Burton continued contributing to his friend's studio albums through the Perspective sessions in April 1968.

The Shindig! exposure led to recording session work with a variety of artists, mostly as an unattributed sideman. In 1966, he began focusing more on his work as a session guitarist.

In 1967 Burton played Dobro on the Richie Furay song, "A Child's Claim To Fame" on Buffalo Springfield's second album, Buffalo Springfield Again. Due to the volume of work, Burton turned down an offer to join Bob Dylan's first touring band, and another offer to play on Elvis Presley's 1968 comeback TV special Elvis.

=== With Elvis Presley ===
In 1969, Presley again asked Burton to join his show in Las Vegas, and, this time, Burton accepted. Burton organized the TCB Band, serving as its leader, and backed Presley from 1969 until Presley's death in 1977. A hallmark of Presley's live shows during this period was his exhortation, "Play it, James", as a cue for the guitarist's solos. For the first season in Vegas in 1969, Burton played his red standard Telecaster. Shortly thereafter, he purchased the now familiar pink paisley custom Telecaster. Burton was not sure that Elvis would like it; however, since Elvis did, Burton used it for every show.

While working with Elvis Presley, he also recorded a solo album, The Guitar Sounds of James Burton, in 1971.

=== With Emmylou Harris and John Denver ===
During 1975 and 1976, while still touring with Presley, Burton was one of the first members to join and tour with Emmylou Harris as part of her backing band, the "Hot Band", after the death of Gram Parsons. He was joined by a cast of talented musicians which included his bandmate with Presley, Glen D. Hardin, and newer musicians which included Rodney Crowell. However, once Presley was ready to return to the road, Burton returned to perform with him, although the others, including Hardin, elected to continue with Harris. Just before Presley died in 1977, Burton was called to play on a John Denver television special. During the taping, Denver asked if Burton would consider going on a European tour. Burton said he was working with Elvis, but if scheduling permitted, he would be glad to go. Shortly after Presley's death, Burton began a regular collaboration with Denver. The first album they recorded was I Want to Live.

During the sessions, Burton and Denver talked about a band. Glen Hardin and Jerry Scheff, from Presley's band, joined the new band too. Burton remained a member of Denver's band until 1994, but often toured in parallel with other artists including Jerry Lee Lewis. In the 16 years Burton worked with Denver, they recorded 12 albums and toured around the world. While touring with Denver, Burton carried several instruments, including backup Dobros and a spare 1969 Pink Paisley Fender Telecaster he had used as a touring guitarist with Elvis Presley during the 1970s. He rejoined Denver in 1995 for the Wildlife Concert. When Denver died in 1997, Burton spoke at his memorial service in Aspen, Colorado.

=== Recent career ===
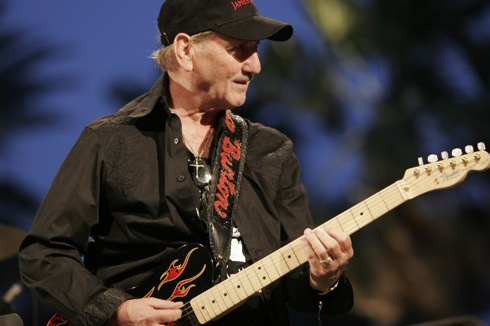
Burton in concert, 2009

Burton's later career included work with John Denver, Merle Haggard, Rodney Crowell, and Emmylou Harris. Beginning with King of America (1986), Burton recorded and toured with Elvis Costello intermittently for about a decade. In 1988, he was a prominent part of the acclaimed Cinemax special, Roy Orbison and Friends, A Black and White Night. In 1990, Burton moved back to his hometown of Shreveport permanently.

Between 1998 and 2013, Burton played lead guitar in Elvis: The Concert which reunited some of Presley's former TCB bandmates, background singers, and Presley's orchestral conductor Joe Guercio (mostly from the "concert years" 1969–1977) live on stage.

In fall 2004, Burton recorded Matt Lucas-Back in the Saddle Again, a sequel to the Matt Lucas album The Chicago Sessions. The album features rockabilly and country music, and was released in May 2006 by Ten O Nine Records.

In 2005, Burton started the annual James Burton International Guitar Festival to raise money for his charitable foundation. The festival is held in the Red River District of Shreveport.

In 2007, he was inducted into the Musicians Hall of Fame and Museum in Nashville, TN as a member of the L.A. session player group known as The Wrecking Crew. In 2008, Burton was asked by Brad Paisley to play on his upcoming album Play: The Guitar Album. Burton was featured on an instrumental track called "Cluster Pluck", which also featured Vince Gill, Albert Lee, Steve Wariner, John Jorgenson, Brent Mason, and Redd Volkaert. At the 51st Grammy Awards in 2009, the song won Best Country Instrumental Performance.

On August 22, 2009, on stage at his James Burton International Guitar Festival, James Burton was inducted into The Louisiana Music Hall of Fame. On July 15, 2010, Rolling Stone Magazine announced that Eric Clapton and James Burton would provide guitars on the track "You Can Have Her" for Jerry Lee Lewis' album Mean Old Man, scheduled for release in fall 2010. Burton also joined Jerry Lee Lewis on "Swinging Doors" on the same album. In 2011, Burton was named one of "Five Living Legends of Shreveport" by Danny Fox of KWKH radio. On June 9, 2012, Burton appeared in Shreveport at the Municipal Auditorium for a presentation of Garrison Keillor's Prairie Home Companion.

In 2019, for the first time since 2014, the TCB Band performed a new Elvis: The Concert-style show, alongside the Royal Philharmonic Orchestra, combining elements from the 2016-2018 Presley/Philharmonic tours with the old 1997-2014 TCB Band tours; however, no further tours with the TCB Band members were booked after this point.

In March 2020, it was announced that Burton and producer T-Bone Burnett were collaborating with Jerry Lee Lewis and recording a new album of gospel covers. It was the first time Lewis had entered a recording studio following his stroke. As of 2023, it is unknown how much progress was made with this gospel album, or if it was ever completed, as nothing from these sessions has been released; Lewis later recorded another gospel album with his cousin Jimmy Swaggart that was unrelated to the 2020 project with Burnett and Burton.

In 2022 and early 2023, Burton was sidelined due to contracting the coronavirus, being diagnosed with kidney cancer, and breaking his hip. In June 2023, Burton led an all-star group of guest musicians at the London Palladium for a concert event named "James Burton & Friends: One Night Only". The event featured Burton joined by Sir Brian May of Queen, Albert Lee, Van Morrison, Jeff "Skunk" Baxter, Ronnie Wood, and Elvis Costello. In September 2023, Burton contributed to recordings for Brad Paisley's upcoming album Son of the Mountains.

In January 2024, Burton participated in the Tournament of Roses Parade in Pasadena, California, riding on a Louisiana-themed float. Also in 2024, Burton was inducted into the Country Music Hall of Fame.

== Equipment and playing style ==
Burton works with a variety of amplifiers to provide flexibility and a wide range of sounds. He has used a Music Man 210-150, an old Fender Twin with K model Lansing speakers, and a 1964 Fender Deluxe. His primary guitar has always been a Fender Telecaster, beginning with an early blonde model his parents bought for him around 1952. His 1969 Paisley Red (better known as Pink Paisley) Telecaster became the basis for his James Burton Telecaster model in 1991, with Lace Sensor pickups and a TBX tone circuit. Five years later his 1953 Candy Apple Red Telecaster was the inspiration for a standard version Artist Signature model featuring two Fender Texas Special Tele single coil pickups and a vintage-style 6-saddle bridge. In 2006, the Signature Paisley model was redesigned with a red paisley flame design over a black body, plus three specially designed blade pickups, a no-load tone control and S-1 switching system.

Burton can also be seen playing an early model Fender Jazz Master (possibly a prototype) in a circa 1961 live television version of "Hello Mary Lou" with Nelson. There is no other recorded evidence that he used this guitar again.

According to the biography on Burton's official website, his style of lead playing is unique, as "[he] uses a straight pick and a fingerpick on his middle finger. On this record [starting with his performance on Nelson's "Believe What You Say"], James replaced his first 4 strings with banjo strings and moved the A and D string up to D and E. This allowed him to bend the strings up a lot more. James' legendary chickin' pickin' was born. He later had them [his guitar strings] gauged: .009, .010, .012, .024, .032 and .038."

== Planned museum ==
The James Burton Foundation, a 501(c) non-profit organization at 714 Elvis Presley Avenue in Shreveport, is constructing the proposed "James Burton Guitar and Car Museum". The facility will showcase Burton's collection of guitars and classic cars as well as models from some of his celebrity friends.

== Collaborations ==
With Hoyt Axton

- My Griffin Is Gone (Columbia Records, 1969)
- Life Machine (A&M Records, 1974)
- Southbound (A&M Records, 1975)
- Fearless (A&M Records, 1976)
- A Rusty Old Halo (Jeremiah Records, 1980)
- American Dreams (Global Records, 1984)

With The Beach Boys

- 20/20 (Capitol Records, 1969)
- Sunflower (Reprise Records, 1970)

With The Beau Brummels

- Triangle (Warner Bros. Records, 1967)

With The Byrds

- The Notorious Byrd Brothers (Columbia Records, 1968)

With JJ Cale

- Shades (Island Records, 1981)
- Travel-Log (Silvertone Records, 1990)

With Glen Campbell

- Gentle on My Mind (Capitol Records, 1967)
- By the Time I Get to Phoenix (Capitol Records, 1967)
- I Knew Jesus (Before He Was a Star) (Capitol Records, 1973)

With Shawn Camp

- Shawn Camp (Reprise Records, 1993)
- 1994 (Reprise Records, 2010)

With Kim Carnes

- Rest on Me (Amos Records, 1971)

With Carlene Carter

- I Fell in Love (Reprise Records, 1990)

With Johnny Cash

- John R. Cash (Columbia Records, 1975)
- Johnny 99 (Columbia Records, 1984)

With Rosanne Cash

- Right or Wrong (Columbia Records, 1980)

With David Cassidy

- Dreams Are Nuthin' More Than Wishes (Bell Records, 1973)

With Mark Collie

- Hardin County Line (MCA Records, 1990)
- Born and Raised in Black & White (MCA Records, 1991)

With Judy Collins

- Who Knows Where the Time Goes (Elektra Records, 1968)

With Elvis Costello

- King of America (F-Beat Records, 1986)
- Mighty Like a Rose (Warner Bros. Records, 1991)
- Kojak Variety (Warner Bros. Records, 1995)

With Marshall Crenshaw

- Good Evening (Warner Bros. Records, 1989)

With Rodney Crowell

- Ain't Living Long Like This (Warner Bros. Records, 1978)

With Delaney & Bonnie

- Genesis (GNP, 1971)

With John Denver

- I Want to Live (RCA Records, 1977)
- John Denver (RCA Records, 1979)
- Autograph (RCA Records, 1980)
- Seasons of the Heart (RCA Records, 1982)
- It's About Time (RCA Records, 1983)
- Dreamland Express (RCA Records, 1985)
- One World (RCA Records, 1986)
- Higher Ground (Windstar Records, 1988)
- Earth Songs (Windstar Records, 1990)
- Christmas, Like a Lullaby (Windstar Records, 1990)
- The Flower That Shattered the Stone (Windstar Records, 1990)
- Different Directions (Windstar Records, 1991)

With Cass Elliot

- Dream a Little Dream (Dunhill Records, 1968)

With Phil Everly

- Star Spangled Springfield (RCA Victor, 1973)

With Bobbie Gentry

- Ode to Billie Joe (Capitol Records, 1967)
- The Delta Sweete (Capitol Records, 1968)

With Angus Gill

- Postcards (ORiGin Music/Warner, 2025)

With Arlo Guthrie

- Running Down the Road (Reprise Records, 1969)

With Hager Twins

- Motherhood, Appie Pie and the Flag (Capitol Records, 1971)
- The Hagers (Elektra Records, 1974)

With Emmylou Harris

- Pieces of the Sky (Reprise Records, 1975)
- Elite Hotel (Reprise Records, 1975)
- Luxury Liner (Warner Bros. Records, 1977)
- Quarter Moon in a Ten Cent Town (Warner Bros. Records, 1978)
- Light of the Stable (Warner Bros. Records, 1979)
- Evangeline (Warner Bros. Records, 1981)
- Cimarron (Warner Bros. Records, 1981)

With Emmylou Harris and Rodney Crowell

- Old Yellow Moon (Nonesuch Records, 2013)

With Dale Hawkins

- Oh! Suzy-Q (MCA Records, 1958)
- L.A., Memphis & Tyler, Texas (Bell Records, 1969)

With Ronnie Hawkins

- The Hawk (United Artists Records, 1979)

With Lee Hazlewood

- The N.S.V.I.P.'s (Not...So...Very...Important...People) (Reprise Records, 1964)
- Friday's Child (Reprise Records, 1965)
- Love and Other Crimes (Reprise Records, 1968)

With Chris Hillman

- Desert Rose (Sugar Hill Records, 1984)

With Jan & Dean

- Save for a Rainy Day (J&D, 1966)

With Sammy Johns

- Sammy Johns (General Recording, 1973)

With Nicolette Larson

- Nicolette (Warner Bros. Records, 1978)

With Jim Lauderdale

- Patchwork River (Thirty Tigers, 2010)
- I'm a Song (Sky Crunch Records, 2014)

With Drake Milligan

- Dallas/Fort Worth (BBR Records, 2022)

With Ronnie Milsap

- Ronnie Milsap (Warner Bros. Records, 1971)

With Joni Mitchell

- For the Roses (Asylum Records, 1972)

With The Monkees

- The Monkees (Colgems Records, 1966)
- More of the Monkees (Colgems Records, 1967)
- The Birds, the Bees & the Monkees (Colgems Records, 1968)
- Instant Replay (Colgems Records, 1969)
- The Monkees Present (Colgems Records, 1969)
- Changes (Colgems Records, 1970)

With Michael Martin Murphey

- Michael Martin Murphey (Liberty Records, 1982)

With Michael Nesmith

- The Wichita Train Whistle Sings (Dot, 1968)
- Nevada Fighter (RCA Records, 1971)

With Randy Newman

- Randy Newman (Reprise Records, 1968)

With Harry Nilsson

- Harry (RCA Victor, 1969)

With The Oak Ridge Boys

- Room Service (ABC Records, 1978)

With Tom Pacheco

- Swallowed Up in the Great American Heartland (RCA Victor, 1976)

With Brad Paisley

- Time Well Wasted (Arista Records, 2005)
- Play: The Guitar Album (Arista Records, 2008)

With Gram Parsons

- GP (Reprise Records, 1973)
- Grievous Angel (Reprise Records, 1974)

With Michael Parks

- Closing The Gap (MGM, 1969)
- Long Lonesome Away (MGM, 1970)

With John Phillips

- John Phillips (John, the Wolf King of L.A.) (Dunhill Records, 1970)

With Elvis Presley

- From Memphis to Vegas/From Vegas to Memphis (RCA Records, 1969) (second disc; live album also released separately in 1970 as Live in Person at the International Hotel)
- On Stage (RCA Records, 1970)
- That's the Way It Is (RCA Records, 1970)
- Elvis Country (I'm 10,000 Years Old) (RCA Records, 1971)
- Love Letters from Elvis (RCA Records, 1971)
- Elvis Sings the Wonderful World of Christmas (RCA Records, 1971)
- Elvis Now (RCA Records, 1972)
- He Touched Me (RCA Records, 1972)
- As Recorded at Madison Square Garden (RCA Records, 1972)
- Aloha from Hawaii via Satellite (RCA Records, 1973)
- Elvis (RCA Records, 1973)
- Raised on Rock / For Ol' Times Sake (RCA Records, 1973)
- Good Times (RCA Records, 1974)
- Elvis Recorded Live on Stage in Memphis (RCA Records, 1974)
- Promised Land (RCA Records, 1975)
- Today (RCA Records, 1975)
- From Elvis Presley Boulevard, Memphis, Tennessee (RCA Records, 1976)
- Moody Blue (RCA Records, 1977)
- Elvis in Concert (RCA Records, 1977)
- Elvis Aron Presley (RCA Records, 1980) (box set featuring unreleased live recordings from 1975)
- The Alternate Aloha (RCA Records, 1988)
- An Afternoon in the Garden (RCA Records, 1997)
- Live 1969 (RCA/Legacy, 2019)
- From Elvis in Nashville (RCA/Legacy, 2020) (box set featuring undubbed master recordings and alternate takes from 1970 recording sessions)
- Back in Nashville (RCA/Legacy, 2021) (box set featuring undubbed master recordings and alternate takes from 1971 recording sessions)
- Elvis on Tour (RCA/Legacy, 2022/2023)

With Johnny Rivers

- Realization (Imperial Records, 1968)
- Slim Slo Slider (Imperial Records, 1970)
- Home Grown (United Artists Records, 1971)
- Wild Night (United Artists Records, 1976)

With Kenny Rogers

- Share Your Love (Liberty Records, 1981)

With Evie Sands

- Any Way That You Want Me (Rev-Ola, 1970)

With Billy Joe Shaver

- Gypsy Boy (Capricorn Records, 1977)

With Frank Sinatra

- Some Nice Things I've Missed (Reprise, 1974)

With Nancy Sinatra

- Sugar (Reprise Records, 1966)

With Tom Snow

- Taking It All in Stride (Capitol Records, 1975)

With Buffalo Springfield

- Buffalo Springfield Again (Atco Records, 1967)

With The Tractors

- The Tractors (Arista Records, 1994)
- Have Yourself a Tractors Christmas (Arista Records, 1995)
- Fast Girl (Audium Records, 2001)

With Tina Turner

- Tina Turns the Country On! (United Artists Records, 1974)

With Townes Van Zandt

- Our Mother the Mountain (Poppy, 1969)

With Sammy Walker

- Sammy Walker (Warner Bros. Records, 1976)

With Gillian Welch

- Revival (Almo Sounds, 1996)

== See also ==
- Hybrid picking
