= James Burton Telecaster =

Electric guitar made by Fender

The James Burton Telecaster is a Signature/Artist Series electric guitar made by Fender Musical Instruments Corporation. The guitar is available in two models, Upgrade and Standard, and both were designed by American country-rock guitarist James Burton along with Dan Smith at Fender. Both models are patterned after mid-century Fender Telecaster guitars played by Burton during his long career with Ricky Nelson, Elvis Presley (James was hesitant to play his now infamous pink paisley Telecaster because it was thought was too bright, but Elvis's guys persuaded him to play it live on stage, which Elvis loved), Merle Haggard, Emmylou Harris, John Denver and many other well-known artists.

== James Burton Telecaster Upgrade ==
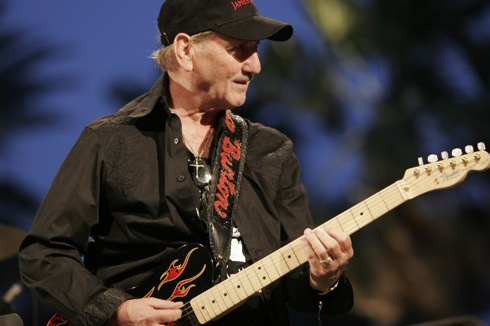
James Burton - Live in Concert with his current Upgrade model Telecaster

The original Upgrade was introduced in 1991 and had a poplar body, three Lace Sensor pickups (models Blue at the neck, Silver in the middle and Red at the bridge) and a treble/bass expander (TBX) tone control. The TBX was a dual function stacked potentiometer tone control. Fender.com described the TBX tone control as follows: "This detented, stacked 250k/1 Meg control enhances your tonal palette . the TBX is your standard tone control, but once you pass 5 you start to decrease the resistance, which allows more bass, treble, presence and output to flow to your amp." This model was available in Black/Gold Paisley, Black/Candy Red Paisley, Pearl White and Frost Red.

The current Upgrade model features a solid basswood body finished in solid Olympic Pearl, or with a flame design in Red Paisley or Blue Paisley on a black background. This model is based on a 1969 Paisley Red model Telecaster (popularly called Pink Paisley) that Burton played while touring with Elvis Presley from 1969 to 1977. The neck is the same as the Standard model. The electronics include three specially designed James Burton blade single-coil pickups (mounted similar to the Stratocaster layout) and a 5-way "Strat-o-Tele" pickup selector with an S-1 switching system that allows a wide variety of pickup tones. The hardware includes a gold-plated hard-tail Strat bridge, gold-plated Schaller die-cast tuners with black or pearl buttons and gold-plated tone and volume knobs. The current Upgrade model was designed to commemorate a 2005 benefit concert for the James Burton Foundation in Shreveport, Louisiana. This model is made in USA.

== James Burton Standard Telecaster ==
The Standard model of the James Burton Telecaster was introduced in 1996 and features a solid alder body finished in Two-Tone-Sunburst or Candy Apple Red with a 1-ply white pickguard. This model was inspired by Burton's third guitar, the 1953 Telecaster that he played on the seminal 1957 recording of "Susie Q" with Dale Hawkins. The neck is a 1-piece maple 1960s vintage U-shape design with a satin finish and 1950s-style decals. The hardware includes a vintage six-saddle Telecaster bridge, a pair of Texas Special Tele single-coil pick ups, a three-way switch and vintage chrome Ping tuners. This instrument is made in Mexico.

== See also ==
- James Burton
- Fender Musical Instruments Corporation
- Fender Telecaster
