= Al Dvorin =

American bandleader and talent agent (1922–2004)

Albert Dvorin (November 18, 1922, in Chicago, Illinois – August 22, 2004, near Ivanpah, California) was an American promoter, concert announcer and talent agent who was best known for working with Elvis Presley.

As a young man, Dvorin was a trumpet player who had his own orchestra. Dvorin also worked as a talent agent in Chicago early in his career. He specialized in booking what were then known as midget acts and performing animal acts. Dvorin was also the booking agent for Pee Wee King, a country performer who frequently opened for Eddy Arnold.

He was Presley's agent at the start of the singer's career, and booked him as an opening act to other performers such as Hank Snow. When Colonel Tom Parker became Presley's agent, Dvorin took on the duty of booking opening acts for Presley's performances. Among the acts he booked was the "Elvis Presley Midget Fan Club".

Dvorin organized an Elvis impersonator talent show in 1958, won by Ral Donner, a renowned early Elvis impersonator. He was later made the announcer for Presley's performances. In this role on multiple occasions he made the statement "Elvis has left the building". Although Dvorin did not originate the phrase, he helped popularize it.

Parker liked to schedule Presley with opening acts like "comedians, jugglers and acrobats", and Dvorin was the agent trusted to book those opening acts. When Presley died in 1977, Dvorin did not want to jeopardize his relationship with Parker, so he did not try to profit from his relationship with Presley. When Parker died in 1997, Dvorin started working for Presley tribute shows.

After announcing for an Elvis tribute show in August 2004, featuring Elvis impersonator Paul Casey at the Trump 29 Casino in Coachella, California, Dvorin was killed in a car accident on the way back to Las Vegas. After his death, Presley estate spokesperson Todd Morgan said of the iconic phrase, "Al made it his own with his particular style."
