= The Courtship of Eddie's Father (film) =

1963 film by Vincente Minnelli

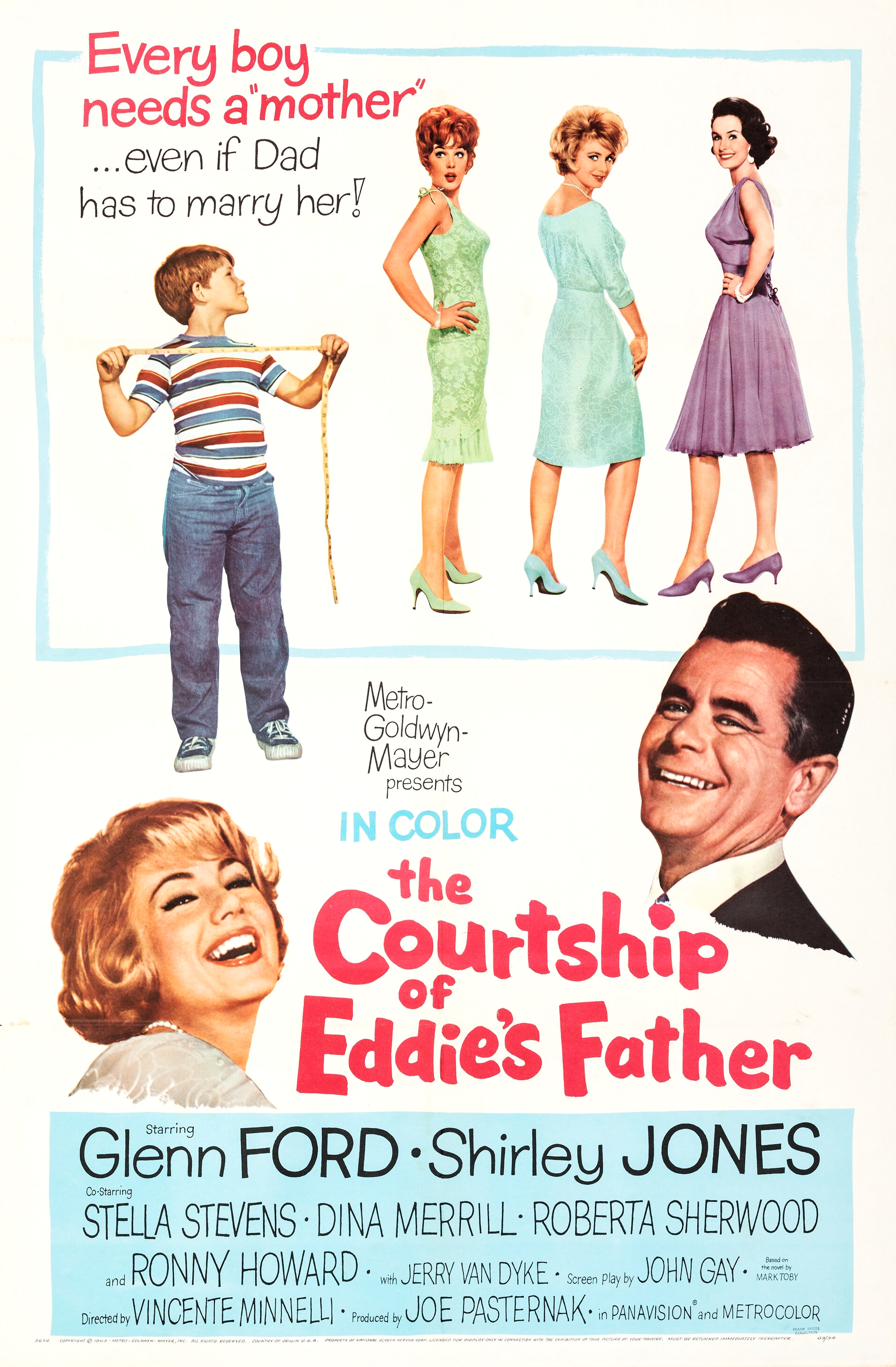
- Theatrical release poster
- Directed by: Vincente Minnelli
- Screenplay by: John Gay
- Based on: The Courtship of Eddie's Father; 1961 novel by Mark Toby
- Produced by: Joe Pasternak
- Starring: Glenn Ford; Shirley Jones; Stella Stevens; Dina Merrill; Roberta Sherwood; Ronny Howard; Jerry Van Dyke
- Cinematography: Milton Krasner
- Edited by: Adrienne Fazan
- Music by: George Stoll
- Production companies: Euterpe; Venice Productions
- Distributed by: Metro-Goldwyn-Mayer
- Release date: March 27, 1963
- Running time: 118 minutes
- Country: United States
- Language: English
- Box office: $2 million (U.S. and Canada rentals)

The Courtship of Eddie's Father is a 1963 American romantic comedy-drama film directed by Vincente Minnelli, starring Glenn Ford as Tom Corbett, a widowed father, and Ronny Howard as the titular son. The film is based on the 1961 novel of the same name by Mark Toby. The film was subsequently adapted into a television series with Bill Bixby and Brandon Cruz, which aired on ABC from 1969 to 1972.

== Plot ==
Six-year-old Eddie Corbett lives with his widowed father, Tom, a radio station executive, in Manhattan. Eddie is still grieving over the death of his mother. Tom's newly hired housekeeper, Mrs. Livingston, tells him about his next-door neighbor Elizabeth Marten, a young divorcée. Shorty afterwards, Tom answers the door and greets Elizabeth, who has brought fudge brownies for Eddie. Tom and Elizabeth talk briefly until they are startled by Eddie's screams. One of Eddie's goldfish has died, and Elizabeth comforts him. Tom, struggling with his son's grief, demands that Eddie overcome it. Elizabeth leaves after a brief argument with Tom.

One night while Tom and Eddie are at an arcade, Eddie spots Dollye Daly, a redheaded woman. Dollye approaches the two, asking Tom to have Eddie accompany her while her picture is being painted. Afterwards, Dollye talks over drinks with Tom. The next day, during a commercial break, Tom brings Dollye to the radio station as a potential girlfriend for womanizing disc jockey Norman Jones. Meanwhile, Rita Behrens, a socialite fashion designer being interviewed on Norman's program, becomes romantically interested in Tom.

One night, Tom asks Elizabeth to help treat Eddie, who has a fever. Elizabeth stays overnight, and she and Tom have breakfast together. However, they fall into another argument, and she leaves. At a bowling alley, Tom and Rita, and Norman and Dollye have a double date. Norman and Dollye later leave and go to a nightclub. There, Dollye does an impromptu drum performance, which impresses Norman. Back at Rita's apartment, she is invited to a dinner and brings Tom along. That same night, Elizabeth and Mrs. Livingston babysit Eddie.

After a New Year's party, Tom and Elizabeth have drinks together at his apartment. Days later, Tom and Rita have another dinner date. However, Eddie takes an immediate dislike to Rita. During Eddie's birthday party, Rita tells Tom over the phone that Norman and Dollye are engaged to be married. Rita invites Tom to their engagement party, and brings Eddie after Elizabeth and Mrs. Livingston decline to babysit him. While there, Tom questions Eddie about his contempt for Rita.

Months later, Tom takes Eddie to summer camp. After they leave, Mrs. Livingston suggests to Elizabeth that she tie the knot with Tom. Eddie tells his father that he has a crush on a girl. He tells his father that he was going to write in a letter, but the camp censors the mail. After a baseball game, the last camp activity for parents and campers, Rita thoughtlessly mentions Eddie's crush as she is leaving. Tom swears he never told Rita about it. Eddie tearfully tells his father to marry Elizabeth, but Tom declines as he intends to propose to Rita.

At Rita's apartment, Tom proposes to her, but she knows that Eddie does not take well to her and suggests leaving Eddie at Tom's brother's for a few months to give them a chance for their marriage to take. Meanwhile, Tom learns over the phone that Eddie has run away from camp. Tom drives to the camp and learns that Eddie stowed away to Manhattan and is staying with Elizabeth. Back in Manhattan, Tom and Elizabeth have another argument, in which Tom insults Elizabeth's failed marriage. Eddie returns to his father and apologizes for running away. Tom cancels his next date with Rita, deciding to spend more time with his son.

The next morning, Mrs. Livingston leaves for her trip to Brazil. During breakfast, Eddie roleplays as Elizabeth and convinces Tom to call her. Eddie runs to Elizabeth's door, notifying her that his father will be calling her. She later answers the phone. Eddie stands in the hallway between the open doors, and becomes delighted when Tom and Elizabeth are talking again.

== Cast ==
- Glenn Ford as Tom Corbett
- Shirley Jones as Elizabeth Marten
- Stella Stevens as Dollye Daly
- Dina Merrill as Rita Behrens
- Roberta Sherwood as Mrs. Livingston
- Ronny Howard as Eddie Corbett
- Jerry Van Dyke as Norman Jones
- Lee Meriwether as Lee, receptionist at the radio station (uncredited)

== Production ==
The film rights to the novel were purchased by MGM prior to publication for $100,000 in 1961. The Chicago Tribune called the novel "deeply moving, and at the same time, very funny."

Producer Joe Pasternak assigned John Gay to write the script and hired Glenn Ford to star. Shirley Jones accepted her role in part because she did not have to sing.

Roberta Sherwood, a nightclub singer and TV entertainer, made her film debut.

Pasternak says he interviewed hundreds of children to play Eddie but as soon as he talked to Ronny Howard, "I knew he was right."

The bowling alley sequence was filmed at the now defunct Paradise Bowl, located at 9116 South Sepulveda Boulevard in Los Angeles (two miles north of LAX).

== Reception ==
On the review aggregator website Rotten Tomatoes, 67% of 6 critics' reviews are positive, with an average rating of 5.7/10.

== See also ==
- List of American films of 1963
