= John Wilkinson (guitarist) =

American rock singer and guitarist (1945–2013)

- Born: John Richard Wilkinson; July 3, 1945
- Died: January 11, 2013 (aged 67)
- Occupation: Musician
- Instruments: Vocals, guitar

John Richard Wilkinson (July 3, 1945 – January 11, 2013) was an American singer and guitarist best known for performing with Elvis Presley, Chuck Berry and The Greenwood County Singers in 1964. After Wilkinson once performed on a television show in Los Angeles, he received a phone call from Elvis who asked him to join his TCB Band. He went on to perform more than 1000 times with Elvis as his rhythm guitarist until Elvis died in 1977.

== Personal life ==
In 1983, Wilkinson married the love of his life, Terry. In 1989, he suffered a stroke, and later in his life, he struggled with cancer. Wilkinson died on January 11, 2013, at age 67 with his wife by his side. Terry died on September 10, 2017.
