= Glen Hardin =

American piano player and arranger (b. 1939)

Glen D. Hardin
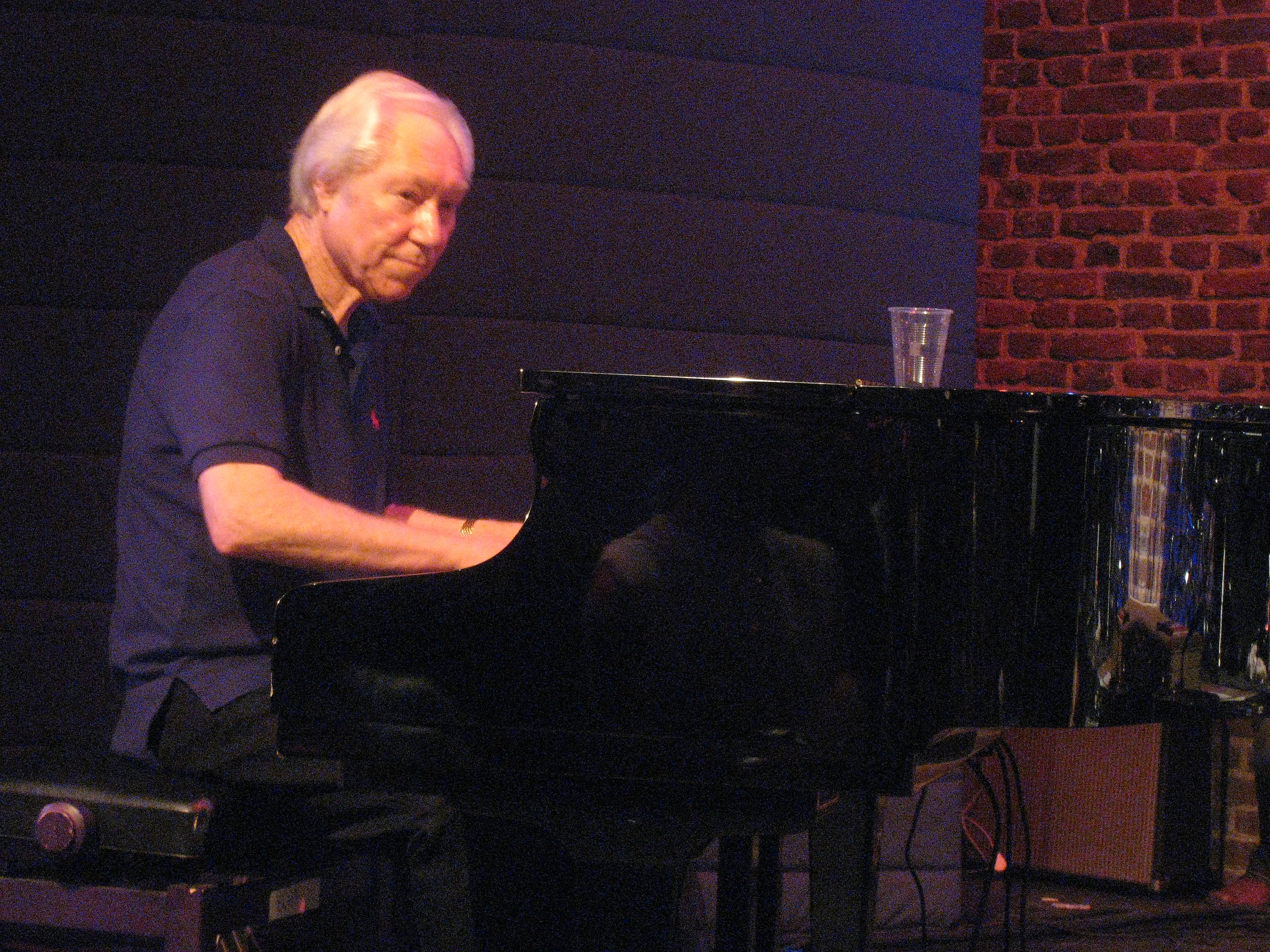

Background information
- Born: Glen Dee Hardin; April 18, 1939 (age 87); Wellington, Texas, US
- Genres: Rock and roll, rockabilly, country, country rock
- Occupations: Musician, songwriter, session musician
- Instruments: Piano, keyboards, keyboard bass
- Years active: 1959–present
- Formerly of: The Crickets, TCB Band

Glen Dee Hardin (born April 18, 1939) is an American piano player and arranger. He has performed and recorded with such artists as Roy Orbison, Elvis Presley, Emmylou Harris, John Denver, and Ricky Nelson.

== Career ==
Hardin was born in Wellington, Texas, a small town in the Texas panhandle. After getting out of the Navy in 1959, Hardin began his musical career in Long Beach, California, and soon joined the house band at the Palomino Club in North Hollywood, called "Country Music's most important West Coast club" by the Los Angeles Times. It featured such performers as Buck Owens, Johnny Cash, Patsy Cline, Linda Ronstadt, Hoyt Axton and Willie Nelson and was also a popular hangout for other country entertainers such as Merle Haggard and Jerry Lee Lewis..

Shortly afterwards, he became a member of the Shindogs, the featured band on Shindig!, an American music variety show which aired on the ABC network from 1964 to 1966. The series house band, the Shin-diggers (later renamed the Shindogs), also featured a young Glen Campbell, James Burton, Billy Preston, Delaney Bramlett, Joey Cooper and Leon Russell. An early episode was taped in Britain with The Beatles as the guests. The series featured other "British Invasion" bands including the Who and the Rolling Stones. Shindig! would continue to broadcast episodes from London throughout its run. Many popular performers of the day played on the show including Ray Charles, Sam Cooke, Lesley Gore, Bo Diddley and Sonny and Cher. It notably featured both black and white acts during a time of racial segregation in the United States.

A native of West Texas, Hardin had grown up with drummer Jerry Allison and bassist Joe B. Mauldin, both members of Buddy Holly's band the Crickets. After Holly's death in 1959, they continued to perform and record with guitarist/songwriter Sonny Curtis. During this period Hardin was made an honorary member of the Crickets and has played with them off and on for many years. Hardin found his first success as a songwriter in 1965 with "Count Me In", recorded by Gary Lewis & the Playboys. "Where Will The Words Come From" and "My Heart's Symphony" were also hits that Hardin penned for Lewis. He soon became an in-demand session pianist and over the years has recorded with numerous artists in a variety of music genres including Bing Crosby, Nancy Sinatra, Dean Martin, Ricky Nelson, Buck Owens, John Denver, Linda Ronstadt, Kenny Rogers, Johnny Rivers, Merle Haggard, Michael Nesmith, Waylon Jennings, and Dwight Yoakam.

In 1970, Hardin got a call from Elvis Presley to replace Larry Muhoberac in the TCB Band, featuring James Burton, Jerry Scheff and Ronnie Tutt. Hardin remained with the band until 1976, touring and recording with Presley and appearing in the Aloha From Hawaii TV special. Hardin studied arranging and arranged many of Presley's hits such as "The Wonder of You", "Let It Be Me" and "I Just Can't Help Believin'". This high-profile position soon led to many other opportunities. In 1972 Gram Parsons, one of the founders of country rock, hired the TCB Band to record his first album, GP. Hardin played piano and was musical director on the sessions for this as well as Parsons' second album, Grievous Angel. Through his work with Parsons, Hardin was introduced to Emmylou Harris, with whom he would work after Parsons' death in the highly praised and influential Hot Band. Across several years this band included James Burton, John Ware, Rodney Crowell, Hank DeVito, Emory Gordy, Jr., Albert Lee, Larrie Londin and Ricky Skaggs. Hardin also played piano on the Roy Orbison television special, A Black and White Night.

== Recent activity ==
Hardin toured in Sweden with the Cadillac band in 2007 and 2008. Hardin continues to tour, regularly performing in Europe. In June 2009 he played Breda in the Netherlands. In January 2010, Hardin went into RCA Studio B in Nashville with the Dutch singer Bouke. Bouke is the winner of the Dutch national TV show Waar Is Elvis (Where Is Elvis). They recorded three songs together for a CD distributed among the Dutch and Belgian members of the Elvis Matters fanclub.

== See also ==
- TCB Band
- The John Denver Band
- Emmylou Harris and her "Hot Band"
