= Jerry Scheff =

American bassist (born 1941)

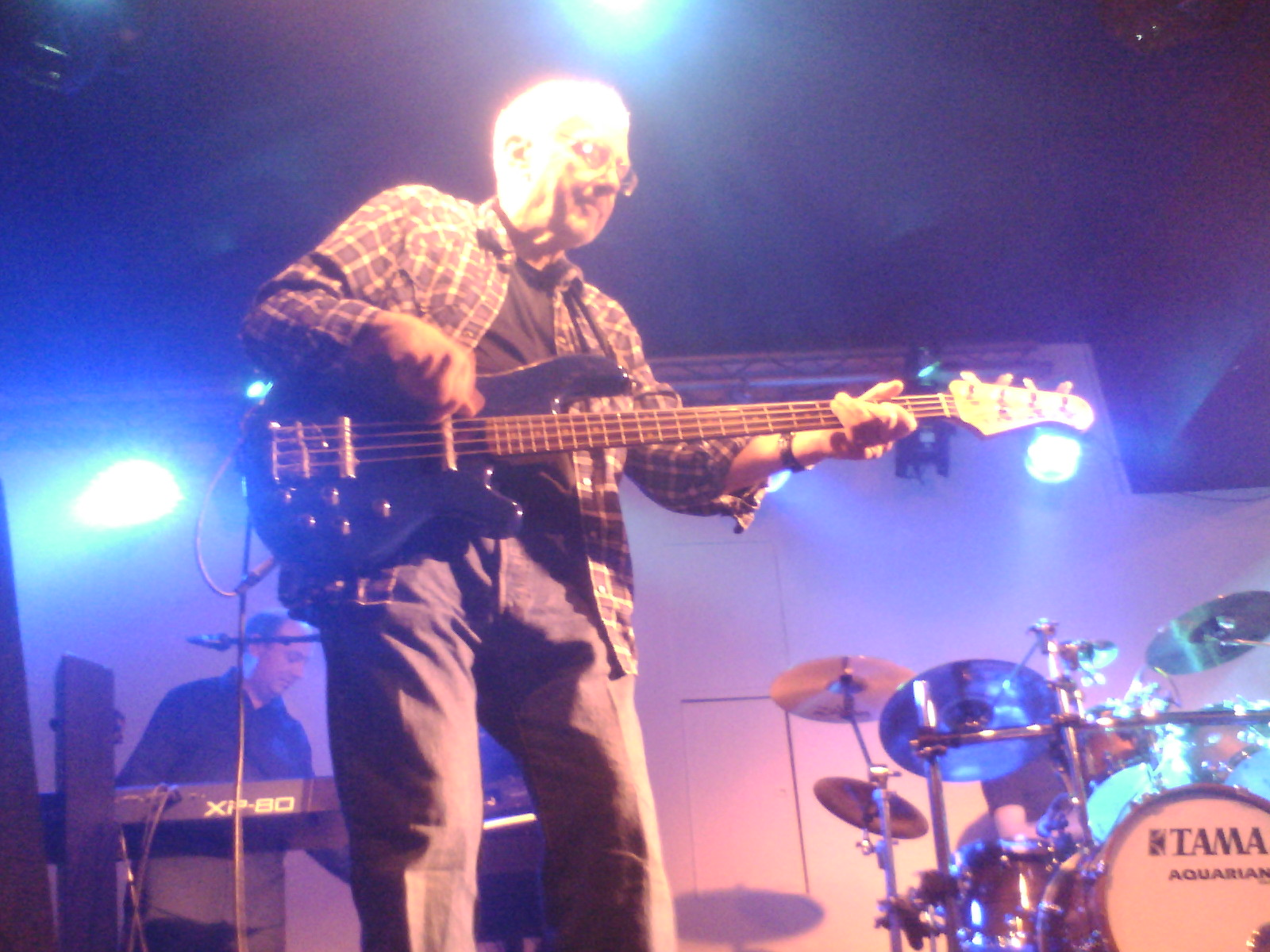
- Jerry Scheff in 2013

Background information
- Born: Jerry Obern Scheff; January 31, 1941 (age 85); Denver, Colorado, United States
- Genres: Rock and roll; rockabilly; R&B; pop; jazz; rock
- Occupation: Musician
- Instruments: Bass guitar; double bass
- Years active: 1958-present
- Website: jerryscheff.weebly.com

Jerry Obern Scheff (born January 31, 1941) is an American bassist, best known for his work with Elvis Presley from 1969 to 1977 as a member of his TCB Band and on the Doors' L.A. Woman.

== Biography ==
Scheff grew up in Vallejo, California. After serving in the U.S. Navy he returned to California, ending up in Los Angeles as a session musician. After working at the Sands nightclub in Los Angeles with 16-year-old Billy Preston, Merry Clayton, and Don "Sugarcane" Harris, he played on his first hit record, The Association's "Along Comes Mary" (1966).

That success led to other sessions with acts such as Bobby Sherman, Johnny Mathis, Johnny Rivers, Neil Diamond, Nancy Sinatra, Pat Boone, Sammy Davis Jr., Bobby Vinton, The Monkees, The Everly Brothers, Todd Rundgren, and the Nitty Gritty Dirt Band. In 1971, he appeared on L.A. Woman, the final album recorded by the Doors with Jim Morrison, playing bass on virtually every track.

In July 1969, Scheff became a member of Elvis Presley's TCB Band. Jerry played bass for the singer from July 31, 1969, to February 23, 1973, and again from April 24, 1975, until Presley's final show on June 26, 1977, at the Market Square Arena in Indianapolis.

He is heard on many Presley albums, beginning with From Memphis to Vegas / From Vegas to Memphis (live 1969 Vegas recordings), and including On Stage: February 1970 (live 1969-1970 Vegas recordings), That's The Way It Is (1970 film soundtrack with live Vegas recordings), Elvis As Recorded At Madison Square Garden (complete live 1972 New York concert), Aloha from Hawaii Via Satellite (complete live 1973 concert broadcast worldwide), From Elvis Presley Boulevard, Memphis, Tennessee (1976 studio work), Moody Blue (1976 studio work and 1977 live recordings). He is also seen performing in Elvis: That's the Way It Is (1970 documentary) and Elvis On Tour (1972 documentary).

In later years, Scheff worked with Elvis Costello, Crowded House, John Denver, Willy DeVille, The Doors, Bob Dylan, Roy Orbison, Sam Phillips, Demis Roussos, Richard Thompson, Chris Hillman, Bernie Leadon, Al Perkins, David Mansfield and many other artists. Scheff was also the bassist for Southern Pacific on their debut album. In the January 1988 Cinemax television special Roy Orbison and Friends, A Black and White Night Scheff played acoustic bass in Orbison's backing band. In 1997, Scheff traveled to the Yukon Territory in Canada and played bass on "American Friend" an album featuring songs written by Alaskan recording artist Rev Neil Down.

Starting in 1997, Jerry joined other original TCB Band members in a project called Elvis: The Concert, a show that featured the video and isolated voice of Elvis with his 1970s backup band and vocalists playing live, perfectly synced using computer technology. In 2009, after touring with Elvis: The Concert for a decade, Scheff left the production.

Jerry has three sons: Jason, born in 1962, Darin in 1963, and Lauren in 1973. Jason grew up to be a professional musician, most notably as the bassist and lead vocalist in the band Chicago from 1985 until 2016. During a 1993 session, Jason co-wrote "Bigger Than Elvis" as a tribute to his dad. Featuring Jerry on bass, the track did not see release until a 2003 box set The Box. Darin and Lauren both followed in their brother's footsteps, also becoming multi-instrumentalists, songwriters and vocalists.

In 2012, Jerry published an autobiography, Way Down: Playing Bass with Elvis, Dylan, the Doors, and More: The Autobiography of Jerry Scheff.

From 2013 to 2017 Scheff performed concerts in England with the singer Jenson Bloomer, playing the greatest hits of Elvis Presley, Bob Dylan, and the Doors. While in 2019 he made two shows in Denmark. A concert and a talk show. Both entirely dedicated to The Doors. On both the show and the concert he performed with the band Doors Legacy. Both were in co-operation with Mr Jan Puggaard Hansen, and were a huge success.

In April 2022 Jerry was back on stage, playing in a concert in Milan, Italy, with the Italian singer and guitarist, Luca Olivieri and his band, as a tribute to Elvis.

== Discography ==
Complete Discography
Year	Title	Group	Instrument
2012	Come to Me/Well Kept Secret/Take Heart	Juice Newton	Bass
2012	The Complete Columbia Album Collection	Johnny Cash	Bass
2012	The RCA Albums Collection	John Denver	Arranger, Bass, Rhythm Arrangements
2011	A Collection	The Doors	Bass
2011	Antelope Freeway/Equinox Express Elevator	Howard Roberts	Bass (Electric)
2011	Runt + Runt: The Ballad of Todd Rundgren	Todd Rundgren	Bass
2011	Setlist: The Very Best of Elvis Presley Live	Elvis Presley	Bass
2010	The Drugstore's Rockin'	Pat Boone	Bass
2009	Elvis 75	Elvis Presley	Bass
2009	I Believe: The Gospel Masters	Elvis Presley	Saxophone
2009	The End: A New Beginning	Krondes, John	Bass
2009	Walking on a Wire: 1968–2009	Richard Thompson	Bass, Bass (Electric), Double Bass, String Bass
2009	Where the Action Is! Los Angeles Nuggets 1965–1968	Bass, Personnel	
2008	Paisley Dreams	Tommy Roe	Bass, Musician
2008	Southbound/Fearless	Hoyt Axton	Bass, Bass Instrument, Featured Artist, Tuba
2008	Speechless/Gagged But Not Bound	Albert Lee	Bass (Acoustic)
2008	Stone of Sisyphus: XXXII	Chicago	Bass, Guest Artist
2008	The Best of the Box	Roy Orbison	Bass, Main Personnel
2008	The Soul Of Rock 'n' Roll	Roy Orbison	Bass, Bass Instrument, Main Personnel
2007	Elvis: Viva Las Vegas	Elvis Presley	Bass
2007	Four Decades of Folk Rock	Bass	
2007	Pilgrims Progress	Mark Levine	Bass
2007	The Best of Elvis Costello: The First 10 Years	Elvis Costello	String Bass
2006	Elvis Lives: The 25th Anniversary Concert	Elvis Presley	Musician
2006	Elvis Lives: The 25th Anniversary Concert [DVD]	Elvis Presley	Musician
2006	Hollywood Maverick: The Gary Paxton Story	Bass	
2006	Live in Los Angeles at PJ's Club	Barney Kessel	Bass, Group Member
2006	Other Voices/Full Circle	The Doors	Bass
2006	Perception	The Doors	Additional Personnel, Bass, Bass Instrument
2006	Southern Nights	Elvis Presley	Bass
2006	Sugar Hill Records: A Retrospective [Box Set]	Bass, Bass (Electric)	
2006	The Essential Roy Orbison	Roy Orbison	Bass
2006	Twenty Twenty: The Essential T Bone Burnett	T-Bone Burnett	Bass, Bass Instrument, Main Personnel, Percussion, String Bass
2005	Crowded House/Temple of Low Men	Crowded House	Bass
2005	Live from Las Vegas	Elvis Presley	Bass, Guitar (Bass), Main Personnel
2005	RetroSpecto	Eliza Gilkyson	Bass
2004	Aloha from Hawaii Via Satellite [DVD Deluxe Edition]	Elvis Presley	Bass
2004		Bakersfield Rebels	Bass
2004	Beach Party: Garpax Surf 'N' Drag		Bass
2004	Boy Trouble: Garpax Girls		Bass
2004	Impossible Dream	Elvis Presley	Musician
2004	Olympia 2003	Frank Michael	Bass, Group Member
2004	Who's Gonna Go Your Crooked Mile?	Peter Case	Bass (Electric)
2003	Bob Dylan [Limited Edition Hybrid SACD Set]	Bob Dylan	Guitar (Bass)
2003	Chicago: The Box [Bonus DVD]	Chicago	Bass
2003	Do Unto Others	Sandy Salisbury	Bass
2003	Elvis at the International	Elvis Presley	Bass
2003	Elvis: Close Up	Elvis Presley	Accompaniment, Bass
2003	L.A. Woman/Morrison Hotel/The Doors	The Doors	Bass
2003	Legacy: The Absolute Best	The Doors	Bass
2003	Many Are the Times	Lee Mallory	Bass
2003	Southern Pacific/Zuma	Southern Pacific	Bass (Electric), Bass (Upright), Vocals (Background)
2003	The First Sessions	Warren Zevon	Bass
2003	Tuff and Stringy Sessions 1966–68	Clarence White	Bass
2002	Anything Anytime Anywhere (Singles 1979–2002)	Bruce Cockburn	Bass
2002	Chambergrass: A Decade of Tunes From the Edges of Bluegrass	Berline + Crary + Hickman	Bass
2002	Just the Right Sound: The Association Anthology [Rhino]	The Association	Bass
2002	Just the Right Sound: The Association Anthology [WEA]	The Association	Bass
2002	Louisiana Rain	Gib Guilbeau	Bass
2002	Sometimes Happy Times	Dotti Holmberg	Guitar (Bass)
2002	Songs Inspired by Literature: Chapter One	The Sibl Project	Primary Artist
2002	That's the Way It's Gonna Be	Lee Mallory	Bass
2002	The Definitive Monkees	The Monkees	String Bass
2002	Voices of the Millennium	The Millennium	Bass
2001	Action Packed: The Best of the Capitol Years	Richard Thompson	Bass
2001	Blue Suede Shoes Collection	Elvis Presley	Bass
2001	Cadillac Walk: The Mink DeVille Collection	Mink DeVille	Bass
2001	Live In Las Vegas	Elvis Presley	Bass
2000	Christmas with Elvis Presley, Johnny Cash, and John Denver		Bass
2000	Elvis Rockabilly	Elvis Presley	Bass (Electric)
2000	Loose Ends	Larry John McNally	Bass
2000	Misty Mirage	Curt Boettcher	Bass
2000	Sandy	Sandy Salisbury	Bass
2000	Sing Australia (In Concert)	John Denver	Bass
2000	The Best of Rosie & the Originals	Rosie & the Originals	Bass
1999	A Hundred Lies	Malcolm Holcombe	Bass, Bass (Upright)
1999	Artist of the Century	Elvis Presley	Bass
1999	Christmas	John Denver	Bass
1999	Concert 1999 World Tour	Elvis Presley	Bass
1999	Shake, Rattle & Roll [MCA] [Original TV Soundtrack]		Bass
1999	Slim Slo Slider/Home Grown	Johnny Rivers	Bass
1999	The Collection [RCA]	Elvis Presley	Bass
1999	The Complete Studio Recordings	The Doors	Bass
1998	A Touch of Platinum, Vol. 2	Elvis Presley	Unknown Contributor Role
1998	Anthology	The Monkees	String Bass
1998	Enchanted: The Works of Stevie Nicks	Stevie Nicks	Bass
1998	Guilty: 30 Years of Randy Newman	Randy Newman	Bass
1998	Like a Hurricane	Chris Hillman	Bass
1998	North American Long Weekend	Tom Freund	Bass
1998	Slide	Lisa Germano	Bass, Unknown Contributor Role
1998	Somewhere in the Middle	Eric Martin	Bass
1997	24 Karat Hits!	Elvis Presley	Unknown Contributor Role
1997	A Heavy Dose of Lyte Psych		Unknown Contributor Role
1997	An Afternoon in the Garden	Elvis Presley	Bass
1997	Decade, 1988–1998	Jackopierce	Bass
1997	Elvis: The Fool Album	Elvis Presley	Bass
1997	Extreme Honey: The Very Best of Warner Brothers Years	Elvis Costello	6-String Bass, Bass, Bass (Upright), Double Bass, Fuzz Guitar, Tuba
1997	Just a Singer/A Cowboy Afraid of Horses	Lobo	Bass, Musician
1997	Lay Me Down	Nancy Bryan	String Bass
1997	Platinum: A Life in Music	Elvis Presley	Unknown Contributor Role
1997	The Very Best of Todd Rundgren	Todd Rundgren	Bass
1997	Vanguard Collector's Edition		Bass (Electric)
1996	Braver Newer World	Jimmie Dale Gilmore	Bass
1996	Greatest Hits [#1]	The Doors	Bass
1996	Omnipop (It's Only a Flesh Wound Lambchop)	Sam Phillips	Bass
1996	XXI	Dwight Twilley	Bass
1996	you? me? us?	Richard Thompson	Bass (Electric)
1995	Earth Songs	John Denver	Bass
1995	For the Love of Harry: Everybody Sings Nilsson		Bass
1995	Greatest Hits [Rhino]	The Monkees	Bass, String Bass
1995	Kojak Variety	Elvis Costello	Ampeg Baby Bass, Bass, Bass (Electric), Guitar (Bass), Hammond B3, Main Personnel, Piano
1995	Ron Sexsmith	Ron Sexsmith	Bass
1995	Solo Collection	Glenn Frey	Bass
1995	Sweetwater	Elvis Costello	Unknown Contributor Role
1995	Torn Again	Peter Case	Bass
1995	Tower of Song: The Songs of Leonard Cohen		Bass
1995	Walk a Mile in My Shoes: The Essential 70's Masters	Elvis Presley	Bass
1994	Beat the Retreat: Songs by Richard Thompson		Bass
1994	Bob Dylan's Greatest Hits, Vol. 3	Bob Dylan	Bass
1994	Bringing on the Weather	Jackopierce	Bass
1994	Dart to the Heart	Bruce Cockburn	Bass, Guitar (Bass), Vocals
1994	Greatest Hits [Curb]	Tommy Roe	Bass
1994	Heartaches & Harmonies [Box Set]	The Everly Brothers	Bass
1994	Martinis & Bikinis	Sam Phillips	Musician, Unknown Contributor Role
1994	Mirror Blue	Richard Thompson	Bass, Double Bass
1994	The Very Best of Elvis Costello and the Attractions	Elvis Costello	Double Bass, Fuzz Bass, String Bass
1994	Unplugged Collection, Vol. 1		Bass
1994	Weapons of the Spirit	Marvin	Bass, Vox Organ
1993	Spinout/Double Trouble	Elvis Presley	Bass
1993	Take a Step over	Dan Crary	Bass, Bass Instrument
1993	Through the Looking Glass	Eliza Gilkyson	Bass
1993	Watching the Dark	Richard Thompson	Bass, Performer, Primary Artist
1993	Way Down Deep in My Soul: The Best of Sugar Hill Gospel, Vol. 2		Bass
1992	99.9 F°	Suzanne Vega	Bass
1992	Strange Weather	Glenn Frey	Bass
1992	The Criminal Under My Own Hat	T-Bone Burnett	Bass
1992	The Radical Light	Vonda Shepard	Bass
1991	Arkansas Traveler	Michelle Shocked	Bass
1991	Cruel Inventions	Sam Phillips	Bass
1991	Deadicated: A Tribute to the Grateful Dead		Bass, Bass (Electric)
1991	Greatest Hits	Southern Pacific	Guitar (Bass)
1991	Listen to the Band	The Monkees	Unknown Contributor Role
1991	Mighty Like a Rose	Elvis Costello	6-String Bass, Bass, Bass (Electric), Bass (Upright), Fuzz Bass, Guitar (Electric), Tuba
1991	Rumor and Sigh	Richard Thompson	Bass
1990	Christmas Like a Lullaby	John Denver	Arranger, Bass, Main Personnel
1990	Flower That Shattered the Stone	John Denver	Bass
1990	The Best of Delaney & Bonnie	Delaney & Bonnie	Bass
1990	The Best of Tommy Roe	Tommy Roe	Bass (Electric)
1989	A Black and White Night Live	Roy Orbison	Bass
1989	Great Balls of Fire		Bass
1989	Maria McKee	Maria McKee	Bass
1989	Mystery Girl	Roy Orbison	Bass, String Bass
1989	Spike	Elvis Costello	Bass, Bass (Electric), Double Bass, Fuzz Bass
1989	The Man with the Blue Post Modern Fragmented Neo-Traditionalist Guitar	Peter Case	Bass, Bass (Electric), Bass (Upright), Guitar (Bass)
1988	A Black and White Night Live [Video]	Roy Orbison	Bass
1988	Amnesia	Richard Thompson	Bass
1988	Gagged But Not Bound	Albert Lee	Bass
1988	Pat McLaughlin	Pat McLaughlin	Bass
1988	Salty Tears	Semi-Twang	Bass
1988	The Alternate Aloha	Elvis Presley	Guest Artist
1988	The Indescribable Wow	Sam Phillips	Bass
1988	Twice the Love	George Benson	Composer
1987	Columbia Records 1958–1986	Johnny Cash	Bass
1987	Delgado Brothers	The Delgado Brothers	Bass
1987	Out of Our Idiot	Elvis Costello	Bass
1987	Stand Up	The Del Fuegos	Composer
1987	The High Lonesome Sound	Tim Scott	Bass
1987	The Talking Animals	T-Bone Burnett	Bass, Guest Artist, Musician
1987	The Turning	Sam Phillips	Bass
1986	Crowded House	Crowded House	Bass
1986	Daring Adventures	Richard Thompson	Bass, Bass (Electric), Bass (Upright), Guest Artist, Main Personnel, String Bass
1986	King of America	Elvis Costello	Bass, Bass (Electric), Double Bass, Guitar (Bass), Main Personnel, String Bass
1986	One World	John Denver	Arranger, Bass
1986	Peter Case	Peter Case	Unknown Contributor Role
1986	T Bone Burnett	T-Bone Burnett	Bass, String Bass
1986	Wild Dogs	Dwight Twilley	Bass
1985	Dreamland Express	John Denver	Arranger, Bass
1985	Ever Call Ready	Ever Call Ready	Bass, Bass (Vocal), Member of Attributed Artist, Primary Artist, Vocals
1985	Southern Pacific	Southern Pacific	Bass, Vocals
1984	Desert Rose	Chris Hillman	Bass, Bass (Acoustic), Guitar (Acoustic), Guitar (Electric), Main Personnel
1984	Greatest Hits, Vol. 3	John Denver	Bass
1984	Slamdance		Bass
1983	Alive, She Cried	The Doors	Bass
1983	It's About Time	John Denver	Arranger, Bass
1983	Johnny 99	Johnny Cash	Drums
1982	Morrison Hotel/L.A. Woman	The Doors	Bass
1982	Seasons of the Heart	John Denver	Arranger, Bass
1980	Le Chat Bleu	Mink DeVille	Bass
1978	An American Prayer	Jim Morrison, The Doors	Bass
1978	Demis Roussos [Mercury]	Demis Roussos	Bass
1978	Ever Call Ready	Chris Hillman	Bass, Primary Artist, Vocals
1978	Oh! Brother	Larry Gatlin & the Gatlin Brothers Band	Bass
1978	Randy Richards	Randy Richards	Bass
1978	Street Legal	Bob Dylan	Bass, Guitar (Bass)
1978	T.N.T.	Tanya Tucker	Bass
1978	Well Kept Secret	Juice Newton	Bass
1977	Broken Blossom	Bette Midler	Bass, Guitar (Bass)
1977	Road Songs	Hoyt Axton	Bass
1977	Spirit of a Woman	American Flyer	Bass, Unknown Contributor Role
1977	The Other Side	Tufano & Giammarese Band	Bass
1976	Fearless	Hoyt Axton	Bass
1976	Photograph	Melanie	Bass
1975	A Cowboy Afraid of Horses	Lobo	Bass
1975	Ain't It Good to Have It All	Jim & Ginger	Guitar (Bass)
1975	Paxton Brothers	Paxton Brothers	Bass
1975	Valdy	Valdy	Bass
1974	The Golden Scarab	Ray Manzarek	Bass
1973	Aloha from Hawaii Via Satellite	Elvis Presley	Guitar (Bass), Main Personnel
1973	Buckingham Nicks	Buckingham Nicks	Bass
1973	Dylan [1973]	Bob Dylan	Bass
1973	Great Scott	Tom Scott	Bass
1973	Letters to My Head	Mike Deasy	Bass
1973	Lookin' for a Smile	Gladstone	Bass
1972	As Recorded at Madison Square Garden	Elvis Presley	Bass
1972	Benny	Benny Hester	Bass
1972	Equinox Express Elevator	Howard Roberts	Bass
1972	I've Found Someone of My Own	The Free Movement	Bass
1972	Gladstone	Gladstone	Bass
1972	Through the Eyes of a Horn	Jim Horn	Bass
1972	Weird Scenes Inside the Gold Mine	The Doors	Bass
1971	America's Sweetheart	Sandy Szigeti	Bass
1971	Helen Reddy [Capitol]	Helen Reddy	Guitar (Bass)
1971	Home Grown	Johnny Rivers	Bass
1971	L.A. Woman	The Doors	Additional Personnel, Bass, Bass Instrument
1971	Minnows	Marc Benno	Bass
1971	Other Voices	The Doors	Bass
1971	Runt: The Ballad of Todd Rundgren	Todd Rundgren	Bass
1971	Sunstorm	John Stewart	Bass
1970	Ananda Shankar	Ananda Shankar	Bass, Guitar (Bass), Main Personnel
1970	Elvis in Person at the International Hotel, Las Vegas, Nevada	Elvis Presley	Bass
1970	Marc Benno	Marc Benno	Bass
1970	On Stage	Elvis Presley	Bass, Guitar (Bass), Main Personnel
1970	Slim Slo Slider	Johnny Rivers	Bass
1970	That's the Way It Is	Elvis Presley	Bass
1970	To Bonnie from Delaney	Delaney & Bonnie	Bass
196?	Mother Hen	Mother Hen	Bass
1969	Goodnight Everybody	Mary McCaslin	Bass
1969	Inner Dialogue	Inner Dialogue	Group Member
1969	Nancy	Nancy Sinatra	Guitar (Bass)
1969	Running Down the Road	Arlo Guthrie	Bass, Unknown Contributor Role
1969	The Moonstone	Tommy Flanders	Bass, Musician
1968	Head	The Monkees	Bass
1968	Sounds of Goodbye	Gosdin Brothers	Bass
1968	The Holy Mackerel	The Holy Mackerel	Bass
1967	Friar Tuck & His Psychedelic Guitar	Friar Tuck and His Psychedelic Guitar	Bass
1967	Here's to You	Hamilton Camp	Bass, Tuba
1967	It's Now Winters Day	Tommy Roe	Bass
1967	Phantasy	Tommy Roe	Musician
1965	On Fire	Barney Kessel	Bass
1964	The Daily Trip	Your Gang	Bass
1964	The New Mustang & Other Hot Rod Hits	Road Runners	Bass
	Dan Cassidy	Dan Cassidy	Bass
	Delivers One More Hallelujah	John Hurley	Bass, Guitar (Bass)
	Freeway Gypsy	Lynne Hughes	Guitar (Bass)
	Handcuffed to a Heartache	Mary K. Miller	Bass
	Jimmy Miller Productions 1976–1979	Joey Stec	Guitar (Bass), Main Personnel
	Working!	Bobby Jameson	Guitar (Bass)

== Bibliography ==
- Way Down: Playing Bass with Elvis, Dylan, the Doors, and More: The Autobiography of Jerry Scheff
