= Roy Orbison discography =

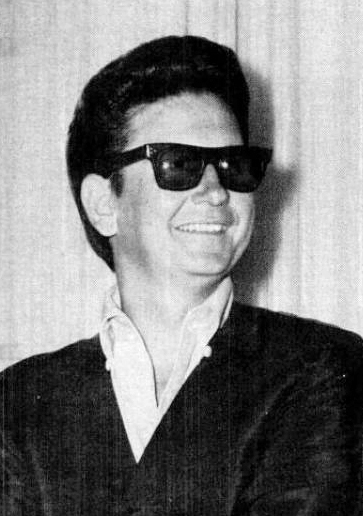
- Orbison in 1965.
- Studio albums: 22
- Extended plays: 13
- Soundtrack albums: 1
- Live albums: 6
- Compilation albums: 45
- Singles: 80
- Video albums: 10
- Music videos: 14
- Box sets: 10

Roy Orbison (April 23, 1936 – December 6, 1988) was an American singer-songwriter who found the most success in the early rock and roll era from 1956 to 1964. He later enjoyed a resurgence in the late 1980s with chart success as a member of the Traveling Wilburys and with his Mystery Girl album, which included the posthumous hit single "You Got It". At the height of his popularity, 22 of Orbison's songs placed on the US Billboard Top 40 chart, and six peaked in the top five, including two number-one hits. In the UK, Orbison scored 10 top-ten hits between 1960 and 1966, including three number-one singles.

Born and raised in Texas, According to The Authorized Roy Orbison, Orbison's first release was in March 1956 on the Je-Wel label. He broke into professional music under Sam Phillips at Sun Records in the summer of 1956, but he found only marginal success there. After a couple years writing for other musicians (including "Claudette", recorded by The Everly Brothers), Orbison recorded several songs at Monument Records under producer Fred Foster starting in 1959. With Foster, Orbison and his frequent songwriting partners Joe Melson and Bill Dees tailored many of Orbison's songs for his unique voice; his most popular songs were dramatic ballads ending with emotional crescendos that showcased his powerful vocals. After his biggest hit in 1964, "Oh, Pretty Woman", Orbison continued to record and chart intermittently in the UK and Australia, but it was not until 1987 that he again found the level of popular worldwide success he had known in the early 1960s, when his original recording of "In Dreams" was used in David Lynch's film Blue Velvet. The following year, Orbison co-founded the supergroup Traveling Wilburys with George Harrison, Jeff Lynne, Bob Dylan and Tom Petty. Lynne produced Orbison's final album Mystery Girl, which was released posthumously in February 1989.

This discography shows main official U.S. and U.K. releases. According to the discography in The Authorized Roy Orbison, there were numerous international single and album releases of importance (not released in the U.S. or U.K.) like the German "San Fernando" b/w "Mama" (London DL 20 726).

== Albums ==
=== Studio albums ===
Title	Album details	Peak chart positions										Certifications
Title	Album details	US	US Country	AUS	CAN	GER	NL	NOR	NZ	SWE	UK	Certifications
Lonely and Blue	Released: January 1961; Label: Monument; Formats: LP	—	—	—	—	—	—	—	—	—	14 (Note: Chart peak upon reissue in 1963.)	
Roy Orbison at the Rock House	Released: December 1961; Label: Sun; Formats: LP	—	—	—	—	—	—	—	—	—	17 (Note: Peak position in 1964 when the album was released as The Exciting Sounds of Roy Orbison.)	
Crying	Released: January 1962; Label: Monument; Formats: LP	21	—	—	—	—	—	—	—	—	17	
In Dreams	Released: July 1963; Label: Monument; Formats: LP	35	—	—	—	—	—	—	—	—	6	
There Is Only One Roy Orbison	Released: August 1965; Label: MGM; Formats: LP, reel-to-reel	55	—	—	—	—	—	—	—	—	10	
The Orbison Way	Released: January 1966; Label: MGM; Formats: LP, reel-to-reel	128	—	—	—	—	—	—	—	—	11	
The Classic Roy Orbison	Released: July 1966; Label: MGM; Formats: LP, 4-track	—	—	—	—	—	—	—	—	—	12	
Roy Orbison Sings Don Gibson	Released: January 1967; Label: MGM; Formats: LP	—	—	—	—	—	—	—	—	—	—	
Cry Softly Lonely One	Released: October 1967; Label: MGM; Formats: LP	—	—	—	—	—	—	—	—	—	—	
Roy Orbison's Many Moods	Released: May 1969; Label: MGM; Formats: LP	—	—	—	—	—	—	—	—	—	—	
The Big O	Released: March 1970; Label: London; Formats: LP; Not released in the US until 2015	—	—	—	—	—	—	—	—	—	—	
Hank Williams: The Roy Orbison Way	Released: August 1970; Label: MGM; Formats: LP	—	—	—	—	—	—	—	—	—	—	
Roy Orbison Sings	Released: May 1972; Label: MGM; Formats: LP	—	—	—	—	—	—	—	—	—	—	
Memphis	Released: November 1972; Label: MGM; Formats: LP	—	—	—	—	—	—	—	—	—	—	
Milestones	Released: September 24, 1973; Label: MGM; Formats: LP	—	—	—	—	—	—	—	—	—	—	
I'm Still in Love with You	Released: September 15, 1975; Label: Mercury; Formats: LP, 8-track	—	—	—	—	—	—	—	—	—	—	
Regeneration	Released: November 23, 1976; Label: Monument; Formats: LP, MC, 8-track	—	—	—	—	—	—	—	—	—	—	
Laminar Flow	Released: May 16, 1979; Label: Asylum; Formats: LP, MC, 8-track	—	—	—	—	—	—	—	—	—	—	
In Dreams: The Greatest Hits	Released: May 28, 1987; Label: Virgin; Formats: CD, 2×LP, MC; Re-recordings of older hits	—	—	24	—	—	—	—	2	—	86	RIAA: Gold; BPI: Silver; RMNZ: Gold
Mystery Girl	Released: January 30, 1989; Label: Virgin; Formats: CD, 2×LP, MC	5	17	1	1	4	1	1	7	1	2	RIAA: Platinum; ARIA: 3× Platinum; BPI: Platinum; BVMI: Gold; GLF: Platinum; MC: 3× Platinum; NVPI: Platinum; RMNZ: Platinum
King of Hearts	Released: October 20, 1992; Label: Virgin; Formats: CD, LP, MC	179	—	25	61	—	—	—	18	—	23	ARIA: Gold
One of the Lonely Ones	Released: December 4, 2015; Label: Universal; Formats: CD, LP, digital download	—	—	40	—	—	—	—	—	—	—	
"—" denotes releases that did not chart or were not released in that territory.

=== Collaboration albums ===
Title	Album details	Peak chart positions										Certifications
Title	Album details	US	US Country	AUS	CAN	GER	NL	NOR	NZ	SWE	UK	Certifications
Class of '55 (with Johnny Cash, Jerry Lee Lewis & Carl Perkins)	Released: May 26, 1986; Label: America/Smash; Formats: CD, LP, MC	87	15	—	—	—	—	—	—	—	—	
Traveling Wilburys Vol. 1 (as Traveling Wilburys)	Released: October 18, 1988; Label: Wilbury; Formats: CD, LP, MC	3	—	1	1	10	33	2	2	2	16	RIAA: 3× Platinum; BPI: Platinum; BVMI: Gold; GLF: Gold; MC: 6× Platinum; RMNZ: Platinum
"—" denotes releases that did not chart or were not released in that territory.

=== Soundtrack albums ===
Title	Album details
The Fastest Guitar Alive	Released: June 1967; Label: MGM; Formats: LP

=== Live albums ===
Title	Album details	Peak chart positions							Certifications
Title	Album details	US	AUS	CAN	NL	NZ	SWE	UK	Certifications
A Black & White Night Live	Released: October 23, 1989; Label: Virgin; Formats: CD, LP, MC	123	28	63	68	14	45	51	ARIA: Gold
Combo Concert: 1965 Holland	Released: January 13, 1998; Label: Orbison; Formats: CD	—	—	—	—	—	—	—	
Live at the BBC	Released: February 1998; Label: Mastertone/BBC; Formats: CD	—	—	—	—	—	—	—	
Authorized Bootleg Collection	Released: October 26, 1999; Label: Orbison; Formats: LP, MC, 8-track	—	—	—	—	—	—	—	
Live at Austin City Limits	Released: April 2001; Label: Orbison; Formats: 4×LP	—	—	—	—	—	—	—	
The Last Concert	Released: August 10, 2010; Label: Eagle; Formats: CD	—	—	—	—	—	—	—	
"—" denotes releases that did not chart or were not released in that territory.

=== Compilation albums ===
Title	Album details	Peak chart positions										Certifications
Title	Album details	US	US Country	AUS	CAN	GER	NL	NOR	NZ	SWE	UK	Certifications
Roy Orbison's Greatest Hits	Released: August 1962; Label: Monument; Formats: LP	13	—	—	—	—	—	—	—	—	—	RIAA: Gold
More of Roy Orbison's Greatest Hits	Released: July 1964; Label: Monument; Formats: LP	19	—	—	—	—	—	—	—	—	—	
Early Orbison	Released: September 1964; Label: Monument; Formats: LP	101	—	—	—	—	—	—	—	—	—	
Oh, Pretty Woman	Released: November 1964; Label: London; Formats: LP; Only released in the UK and several other territories	—	—	—	—	—	—	—	—	—	5	
Roy Orbison's Greatest Hits	Released: January 1965; Label: London; Formats: LP; Germany-only release	—	—	—	—	31	—	—	—	—	—	
Orbisongs	Released: October 1965; Label: Monument; Formats: LP	136	—	—	—	—	—	—	—	—	40 (Note: Peak position upon release in the UK in 1967.)	
The Very Best of Roy Orbison	Released: June 1966; Label: Monument; Formats: LP	94	—	—	—	—	—	—	—	—	—	
The All-Time Greatest Hits of Roy Orbison	Released: November 1972; Label: Monument; Formats: 2×LP, MC, 8-track	—	23 (Note: Peak position in 1983.)	—	99 (Note: Peak position in 1989.)	—	9	4	—	26	39	RIAA: Platinum
The Best of Roy Orbison	Released: November 1975; Label: Arcade; Formats: LP, MC, 8-track; Europe-only release	—	—	—	—	—	—	—	—	—	1	BPI: Gold
20 Golden Greats	Released: July 1980; Label: Monument; Formats: LP, MC; Australasia-only release	—	—	—	—	—	—	—	17	—	—	
Golden Days: The Collection of 20 All-Time Greats	Released: July 1981; Label: Monument; Formats: LP, MC; Europe-only release	—	—	—	—	—	—	—	—	—	63	BPI: Gold
The Very Best Of	Released: November 1986; Label: Arcade; Formats: CD, MC; Netherlands-only release	—	—	—	—	—	61	—	—	—	—	
The Legendary Roy Orbison – The Greatest Hits	Released: October 1988; Label: Telstar; Formats: CD, LP, MC; UK, Ireland and Canada-only release	—	—	—	53	—	—	—	—	—	1	BPI: 2× Platinum; MC: Platinum
For the Lonely: A Roy Orbison Anthology, 1956–1965	Released: December 1988; Label: Rhino; Formats: CD, 2×LP, 2×MC	110	—	—	—	—	—	—	—	—	—	
The Very Best of Roy Orbison	Released: January 1989; Label: J&B; Formats: CD, LP, MC; Australasia-only release	—	—	20	—	—	—	—	22	—	—	
The Collection	Released: February 1989; Label: Arcade; Formats: CD, LP, MC; Netherlands-only release	—	—	—	—	—	7	—	—	—	—	
Pretty Woman	Released: February 1989; Label: CBS; Formats: CD, MC; Europe-only release	—	—	—	—	—	—	—	—	—	—	BPI: Gold
Monumental Hits	Released: February 1989; Label: Axis; Formats: CD, LP, MC; Australia-only release	—	—	133	—	—	—	—	—	—	—	
Blue Bayou – Seine 24 Schönsten Love-Songs	Released: May 1989; Label: CBS; Formats: CD, 2×LP, MC; Continental Europe-only release	—	—	—	—	13	—	—	—	—	—	
Love Songs	Released: 1989; Label: J&B; Formats: CD, LP, MC; Australasia-only release	—	—	137	—	—	—	—	—	—	—	
Ballads – 22 Classic Love Songs	Released: October 1990; Label: Telstar; Formats: CD, LP, MC; UK and South Africa-only release	—	—	—	—	—	—	—	—	—	38	
The Very Best of Roy Orbison & Fats Domino (with Fats Domino)	Released: August 1991; Label: Dino Music; Formats: CD, LP, MC; Australasia-only release	—	—	139	—	—	—	—	18	—	—	
Super Hits	Released: September 5, 1995; Label: Columbia; Formats: CD, MC	104 (Note: Peak position in 2011.)	54 (Note: Peak position in 1997.)	—	—	—	—	—	—	—	—	RIAA: Platinum
The Ultimate Collection	Released: 1996; Label: Columbia; Formats: 2×CD; Australia-only release	—	—	123	—	—	—	—	—	—	—	
The Very Best of Roy Orbison	Released: November 4, 1996; Label: Virgin; Formats: CD, MC	—	29	23	—	75	—	8	—	33	18	ARIA: Platinum; BPI: Gold
Big O – The Original Singles Collection	Released: November 2, 1998; Label: Monument; Formats: 2×CD, 2×MD; Europe and South Africa-only release	—	—	—	—	—	—	—	—	—	—	BPI: Silver
16 Biggest Hits	Released: February 9, 1999; Label: Legacy; Formats: CD, MC	—	47	—	—	—	—	—	—	—	—	RIAA: Platinum
The Very Best Of	Released: December 27, 1999; Label: Virgin; Formats: CD; Released in Europe with various alternate titles	—	—	—	—	77	—	4	—	1	—	GLF: Platinum
Love Songs	Released: 2000; Label: WEA; Formats: 2×CD; Australia-only release	—	—	180	—	—	—	—	—	—	—	
20 Golden Hits	Released: August 2000; Label: TeeVee; Formats: CD, MC	—	69 (Note: Peak position in 2002.)	—	—	—	—	—	—	—	—	
Love Songs	Released: January 29, 2001; Label: Virgin; Formats: 2×CD, 2×MC; Europe and South Africa-only release	—	—	—	—	—	—	—	—	8 (Note: Peak position upon release in Sweden in 2003.)	4	BPI: Gold
Big Hits from the Big 'O'	Released: November 4, 2002; Label: Crimson; Formats: CD; Europe-only release	—	—	—	—	—	—	—	—	—	—	BPI: Gold
The Hits Collection	Released: September 15, 2003; Label: Crimson; Formats: 3×CD	—	—	—	—	—	—	—	—	—	170 (Note: Peak position in 2004.)	BPI: Silver
The Platinum Collection	Released: August 2, 2004; Label: Orbison/Virgin; Formats: 3×CD	—	—	—	—	—	—	—	—	—	16	BPI: Silver
The Essential Roy Orbison	Released: March 28, 2006; Label: Orbison/Monument/Legacy; Formats: 2×CD	—	62	39	—	—	35	6	—	5	149 (Note: Peak position in 2013.)	ARIA: 2× Platinum
The Very Best of Roy Orbison	Released: October 16, 2006; Label: Orbison/Monument/Legacy/Sony BMG; Formats: CD	—	—	11	—	—	—	—	3	—	20	ARIA: Platinum; BPI: Platinum; RMNZ: Platinum
Playlist: The Very Best of Roy Orbison	Released: April 29, 2008; Label: Monument/Orbison/Legacy; Formats: CD	—	50	—	—	—	—	—	—	—	—	
The Monument Singles Collection (1960–1964)	Released: April 15, 2011; Label: Monument/Orbison/Legacy/Sony BMG; Formats: 2×CD, 2×LP	—	55	26	—	—	—	—	32	—	87	
The Monument Singles A-Sides (1960–1964)	Released: April 15, 2011; Label: Monument/Orbison/Legacy/Sony BMG; Formats: CD	—	50	—	—	—	—	—	—	—	—	
Opus Collection	Released: May 10, 2011; Label: Orbison/Legacy; Formats: CD	65	12	—	—	—	—	—	—	—	—	
The Real... Roy Orbison	Released: April 10, 2015; Label: Sony Music/Legacy; Formats: 3×CD	—	—	—	—	—	—	—	—	—	81 (Note: Peak position in 2016.)	
Collected	Released: July 1, 2016; Label: Universal Music; Formats: 3×CD; Netherlands-only release	—	—	—	—	—	13	—	—	—	—	
The Ultimate Collection	Released: October 28, 2016; Label: Monument/Legacy; Formats: CD, 2×LP, digital download	—	40	12	—	—	—	—	—	—	10	BPI: Platinum
A Love So Beautiful (with the Royal Philharmonic Orchestra)	Released: November 3, 2017; Label: Roy's Boys/Monument/Legacy; Formats: CD, LP, digital download	151	26	9	—	—	120	—	9	—	2	BPI: Platinum
Unchained Melodies (with the Royal Philharmonic Orchestra)	Released: November 16, 2018; Label: Roy's Boys/Monument/Legacy; Formats: CD, 2×LP, digital download	—	—	32	—	—	—	—	—	—	3	BPI: Gold
"—" denotes releases that did not chart or were not released in that territory.

=== Box sets ===
Title	Album details	Peak chart positions	
Title	Album details	AUS	UK
The Legendary Roy Orbison	Released: October 1990; Label: CBD; Formats: 4×CD	—	—
The Golden Decade (1960–1969)	Released: November 1990; Label: Knight; Formats: 3×CD. 4×LP; Europe and Australia-only release	165	—
The Hits	Released: September 21, 1992; Label: Pickwick; Formats: 3×CD, 3×MC; UK-only release	—	—
Orbison 1955–1965	Released: February 16, 2001; Label: Bear Family; Formats: 7×CD; Germany-only release	—	—
The Complete Collection	Released: 2003; Label: Insight Music/Orbison; Formats: 2×CD+DVD; Europe-only release	—	—
The Soul of Rock and Roll	Released: November 24, 2008; Label: Monument/Orbison/Legacy; Formats: 4×CD	—	—
Greatest Hits	Released: 2008; Label: Sony BMG; Formats: 3×CD; Europe-only release	—	—
The Monument Vinyl Box	Released: November 29, 2013; Label: Monument/Legacy; Formats: 4×LP	—	—
The MGM Years 1965–1973	Released: December 4, 2015; Label: Universal Music; Formats: 13×CD, 14×LP, digital download	—	—
A Love So Beautiful & Unchained Melodies (with the Royal Philharmonic Orchestra)	Released: June 7, 2019; Label: Rory's Boys/Monument/Legacy; Formats: 2×CD	—	22
"—" denotes releases that did not chart or were not released in that territory.

== EPs ==
Title	EP details	Peak chart positions	
Title	EP details	AUS	UK
Hillbilly Rock	Released: September 1957; Label: London; Formats: 7"; UK and France-only release	—	—
Only the Lonely	Released: December 1960; Label: London; Formats: 7"; UK and Spain-only release	—	15 (Note: Peak position in 1963.)
Roy Orbison	Released: March 1963; Label: London; Formats: 7"; UK-only release	—	—
In Dreams	Released: May 1963; Label: London; Formats: 7"; UK and New Zealand-only release	—	6
She Wears My Ring	Released: May 1964; Label: London; Formats: 7"; Australia-only release	68	—
It's Over	Released: August 1964; Label: London; Formats: 7"; UK and New Zealand-only release	—	3
Sweet and Easy to Love	Released: November 1964; Label: Ember; Formats: 7"; UK-only release	—	—
Oh, Pretty Woman	Released: December 1964; Label: London; Formats: 7"; UK and New Zealand-only release	—	9
Tryin' to Get to You	Released: 1965; Label: Ember; Formats: 7"; UK-only release	—	—
Devil Doll	Released: 1965; Label: Ember; Formats: 7"; UK-only release	—	—
Roy Orbison's Stage Show Hits	Released: February 19, 1965; Label: London; Formats: 7"; UK-only release	—	10
Love Hurts	Released: June 1965; Label: London; Formats: 7"; UK-only release	—	—
Ooby Dooby	Released: December 1976; Label: Charly; Formats: 7"; UK-only release	—	—
"—" denotes releases that did not chart or were not released in that territory.

== Singles ==
=== 1950s ===
Title (A-side/B-side) (Note: The B-sides listed are for the US releases of the singles except where not applicable.)	Year	Peak chart positions	Album
Title (A-side/B-side)	Year	US	Album
"Trying to Get to You" "Ooby Dooby" (as a member of the Teen Kings)	1956	— —	Non-album singles
"Ooby Dooby" (re-recording) "Go! Go! Go!" (as Roy Orbison and the Teen Kings)	1956	59 —	Non-album singles
"Rockhouse" "You're My Baby" (as Roy Orbison and the Teen Kings)	1956	— —	Non-album singles
"Sweet and Easy to Love" "Devil Doll" (as Roy Orbison and the Roses)	1957	— —	Non-album singles
"Chicken-Hearted" "I Like Love"	1957	— —	Non-album singles
"Seems to Me" "Sweet and Innocent"	1958	— —	Non-album singles
"Almost Eighteen" "Jolie"	1959	— —	Non-album singles
"Paper Boy" "With the Bug"	1959	— —	Non-album singles
"Up Town" "Pretty One"	1959	72 —	Non-album singles
"—" denotes releases that did not chart.

=== 1960s ===
Title (A-side/B-side)	Year	Peak chart positions										Certifications	Album
Title (A-side/B-side)	Year	US	US AC	AUS	BEL	CAN	GER	IRE	NL	NZ	UK	Certifications	Album
"Only the Lonely (Know the Way I Feel)" "Here Comes That Song Again"	1960	2 —	— —	5 —	6 —	2 —	— —	2 —	7 —	2 —	1 —	BPI: Silver; RMNZ: Gold	Lonely and Blue Non-album track
"Blue Angel" "Today's Teardrops"	1960	9 —	— —	28 —	— —	14 —	— —	8 —	— —	— —	11 —		Lonely and Blue Non-album track
"I'm Hurtin'" "I Can't Stop Loving You"	1960	27 —	— —	— —	— —	27 —	— —	— —	— —	— —	— —		Lonely and Blue
"Running Scared" "Love Hurts"	1961	1 —	— —	5	— —	1 —	— —	— —	— —	1 —	9 —		Crying
"Crying" "Candy Man"	1961	2; 25	— —	1	— —	3	— —	— —	— —	2 —	25 —	BPI: Silver	Crying Non-album track
"Dream Baby (How Long Must I Dream)" "The Actress"	1962	4 —	— —	2	— —	8 —	— —	1 —	9 —	6 —	2 —		Non-album singles
"The Crowd" "Mama"	1962	26 —	— —	25 —	— —	25 —	— —	— —	— —	— —	40 —		Non-album singles
"Evergreen" (Note: "Evergreen" was only released as a single in Australia.) "Love Star"	1962	— —	— —	100 —	— —	— —	— —	— —	— —	— —	— —		Non-album singles
"Working for the Man" "Leah"	1962	33; 25	— —	1	— —	19	— —	— —	— —	7 —	50 —		Non-album singles
"In Dreams" "Shahdaroba"	1963	7 —	3 —	1 —	7 —	7 —	— —	1 —	— —	— —	6 —	BPI: Silver	In Dreams
"Falling" "Distant Drums"	1963	22 —	7 —	3	8 —	29 —	— —	8 —	— —	— —	9 —		Non-album single
"Blue Bayou" "Mean Woman Blues"	1963	29; 5	— —	1	3 —	14	— —	1	— —	4; 6	3	BPI: Silver	In Dreams Non-album track
"Pretty Paper" "Beautiful Dreamer"	1963	15 —	10 —	4	— 17	9 —	28 —	8 —	— (Note: "Pretty Paper" did not enter the Dutch Single Top 100 (which was then a top ten), but did peak at number 13 on the Dutch Top 40.) —	4 —	6 —	BPI: Silver	Non-album single In Dreams
"Borne on the Wind" (Note: "Borne on the Wind" was not released as a single in North America, but was released in Europe, Australasia and other territories.) "What'd I Say"	1964	— —	— —	8	— —	— —	— —	9 —	— —	— —	15 —		Non-album singles
"It's Over" "Indian Wedding"	1964	9 —	— —	9	4 —	29 —	— —	1 —	4 —	1 —	1 —	BPI: Silver	Non-album singles
"Oh, Pretty Woman" "Yo te amo Maria"	1964	1 —	— —	1 —	1 —	1 —	1 —	1 —	1 —	1 —	1 —	RIAA: Gold; BPI: Platinum; RMNZ: Platinum	Non-album singles
"Goodnight" "Only with You"	1965	21 —	— —	6 —	2 —	5 —	29 —	— —	5 —	— —	14 —		Non-album singles
"(Say) You're My Girl" "Sleepy Hollow"	1965	39 —	— —	8 —	15 —	17 —	— —	— —	10 —	— —	23 —		Non-album singles
"Ride Away" "Wondering"	1965	25 —	— —	15 —	13 —	1 —	— —	— —	— (Note: "Ride Away" did not enter the Dutch Single Top 100 (which was then a top ten), but did peak at number 27 on the Dutch Top 40.) —	— —	34 —		There Is Only One Roy Orbison
"Crawling Back" "If You Can't Say Something Nice"	1965	46 —	— —	15 —	20 —	2 —	— —	— —	— —	— —	19 —		The Orbison Way There Is Only One Roy Orbison
"Let the Good Times Roll" "Distant Drums"	1965	81 —	— —	— —	— —	— —	— —	— —	— —	— —	— —		Non-album single
"Breakin' Up Is Breakin' My Heart" "Wait"	1966	31 —	— —	19 —	9 —	2 —	— —	— —	— (Note: "Breakin' Up Is Breakin' My Heart" did not enter the Dutch Single Top 100 (which was then a top ten), but did peak at number 35 on the Dutch Top 40.) —	— —	22 —		The Orbison Way The Classic Roy Orbison
"Twinkle Toes" "Where Is Tomorrow"	1966	39 —	— —	13 —	14 —	25 —	— —	— —	— —	— —	29 —		The Classic Roy Orbison
"Lana" "Our Summer Song"	1966	— —	— —	4 —	1 —	— —	— —	8 —	19 —	— —	15 —		Crying
"Too Soon to Know" "You'll Never Be Sixteen Again"	1966	68 —	— —	20	5 —	71 —	— —	4 —	— (Note: "Too Soon to Know" did not enter the Dutch Single Top 100 (which was then a top ten), but did peak at number 29 on the Dutch Top 40.) —	— —	3 —		Roy Orbison Sings Don Gibson The Classic Roy Orbison
"Communication Breakdown" "Going Back to Gloria"	1966	60 —	— —	8	— —	64 —	— —	— —	— —	8 —	— —		Cry Softly Lonely One The Classic Roy Orbison
"There Won't Be Many Coming Home" (Note: "There Won't Be May Coming Home" was not released as a single in North America, but was released in Europe, Australasia and various other territories.) "Going Back to Gloria"	1966	— —	— —	12 —	— 15	— —	— —	— —	— —	— —	12 —		The Fastest Guitar Alive The Classic Roy Orbison
"So Good" "Memories"	1967	132 —	— —	28 —	— —	— —	— —	— —	— —	— —	32 —		Non-album single Cry Softly Lonely One
"Cry Softly Lonely One" "Pistolero"	1967	52 —	— —	10 —	— —	29 —	— —	— —	— —	— —	52 —		Cry Softly Lonely One The Fastest Guitar Alive
"She" "Here Comes the Rain Baby"	1967	119 —	— —	23 —	— —	— —	— —	— —	— —	— —	52 —		Cry Softly Lonely One
"Born to Be Loved by You" "Shy Away"	1968	— —	— —	25 —	— —	— —	— —	— —	— —	— —	— —		Non-album single
"Walk On" "Flowers"	1968	121 —	— —	53 —	— —	91 —	— —	— —	— —	— —	39 —		Roy Orbison's Many Moods Non-album track
"Heartache" "Sugar Man"	1968	104 —	— —	57 —	— —	88 —	— —	— —	— —	— —	44 —		Roy Orbison's Many Moods Non-album track
"Southbound Jericho Parkway" "My Friend"	1969	— —	— —	99	— —	— —	— —	— —	— —	— —	— 35		Non-album single
"Penny Arcade" "Tennessee Owns My Soul"	1969	133 —	— —	1 —	— —	— —	— —	— —	— —	7 —	27 —	BPI: Silver	The Big O Non-album track
"Break My Mind" (Note: "Break My Mind" was not released as a single in North America, but was released in Europe and Australasia.) "How Do You Start Over"	1969	— —	— —	26 —	— —	— —	— —	— —	— —	— —	— —		The Big O Non-album track
"—" denotes releases that did not chart or were not released in that territory.

=== 1970s ===
Title (A-side/B-side)	Year	Peak chart positions		Album
Title (A-side/B-side)	Year	US	AUS	Album
"She Cheats on Me" "How Do You Start Over"	1970	— —	— —	Non-album singles
"So Young" "If I Had a Woman Like You"	1970	122 —	82 —	Non-album singles
"(Love Me Like You Did It) Last Night" "Close Again"	1971	— —	— —	Non-album singles
"God Love You" "Changes"	1972	— —	— —	Roy Orbison Sings
"Remember the Good" "Harlem Woman"	1972	— —	— —	Roy Orbison Sings
"Memphis, Tennessee" "I Can Read Between the Lines"	1972	— —	84 —	Memphis Non-album track
"Blue Rain (Coming Down)" "Sooner or Later"	1973	— —	— —	Milestones Non-album track
"I Wanna Live" "You Lay Easy on My Mind"	1973	— —	— —	Milestones
"Sweet Mama Blue" "Heartache" (re-recording)	1974	— —	— —	I'm Still in Love with You
"Hung Up on You" "Spanish Nights"	1975	— —	— —	I'm Still in Love with You
"It's Lonely" "Still"	1975	— —	— —	I'm Still in Love with You
"Still" (Note: "Still" was only released as an A-side single in Australia.) "Circle"	1976	— —	56 —	I'm Still in Love with You
"Belinda" "No Chain at All"	1976	— —	— —	Regeneration
"(I'm a) Southern Man" "Born to Love Me"	1976	— —	— —	Regeneration
"Drifting Away" "Under Suspicion"	1977	— —	— —	Non-album single Regeneration
"Easy Way Out" "Tears"	1979	109 —	— —	Laminar Flow
"Poor Baby" "Lay It Down"	1979	— —	— —	Laminar Flow
"Lay It Down" (Note: "Lay It Down" was only released as an A-side single in the UK.) "Warm Hot Spot"	1979	— —	— —	Laminar Flow
"—" denotes releases that did not chart or were not released in that territory.

=== 1980s ===
Title (A-side/B-side)	Year	Peak chart positions										Certifications	Album
Title (A-side/B-side)	Year	US	US AC	AUS	BEL	CAN	GER	IRE	NL	NZ	UK	Certifications	Album
"That Lovin' You Feelin' Again" (with Emmylou Harris) "Lola" (by Craig Hundley)	1980	55 —	10 —	97 —	— —	— —	— —	— —	— —	— —	— —		Roadie (soundtrack) Non-album track
"Wild Hearts (...Time)" (Note: "Wild Hearts (...Time)" was not released as a single in the US, but was released in Canada, Europe and Australasia.) "Wild Hearts" (instrumental)	1985	— —	— —	— —	— —	— —	— —	— —	— —	— —	76 —		Insignificance (soundtrack) Non-album track
"In Dreams" (re-recording) "Leah" (re-recording)	1987	— —	— —	— —	— —	— —	— —	— —	— —	— —	142 —		In Dreams: The Greatest Hits
"Crying" (with k.d. lang) "Falling" (re-recording)	1987	— —	28 —	— —	— —	2 —	— —	— —	— —	47 —	— —		Hiding Out (soundtrack) In Dreams: The Greatest Hits
"Handle with Care" "Margarita" (as a member of Traveling Wilburys)	1988	45 —	2 —	3 —	9 —	2 —	— —	12 —	24 —	4 —	21 —	BPI: Silver	Traveling Wilburys Vol. 1
Posthumous
"You Got It" "The Only One"	1989	9 —	1 —	3 —	1 —	3 —	9 —	2 —	4 —	2 —	3 —	BPI: Gold; MC: Gold; RMNZ: Platinum	Mystery Girl
"End of the Line" "Congratulations" (as a member of Traveling Wilburys)	1989	63 —	28 —	12 —	39 —	8 —	— —	14 —	50 —	11 —	52 —	BPI: Silver	Traveling Wilburys Vol. 1
"She's a Mystery to Me" "Dream Baby" (live)	1989	— —	23 —	17 —	12 —	13 —	— —	5 —	19 —	30 —	27 —		Mystery Girl Non-album track
"California Blue" "In Dreams" (1987 re-recording)	1989	— —	44 —	65 —	25 —	75 —	34 —	23 —	— —	— —	77 —		Mystery Girl In Dreams: The Greatest Hits
"Oh Pretty Woman" (live) "Claudette"	1989	— —	48 —	112 —	— —	— —	— —	— —	— —	— —	118 —		A Black & White Night Live In Dreams: The Greatest Hits
"—" denotes releases that did not chart or were not released in that territory.

=== 1990 to present ===
Title (A-side/B-side)	Year	Peak chart positions							Certifications	Album
Title (A-side/B-side)	Year	US AC	AUS	CAN	GER	IRE	NZ	UK	Certifications	Album
"The Comedians" (Note: "The Comedians" was only released as a single in Germany.) "The Comedians" (live)	1990	— —	— —	— —	— —	— —	— —	— —		Mystery Girl A Black & White Night Live
"Windsurfer" (Note: "Windsurfer" was only released as a single in Continental Europe.) "Move on Down the Line" (live)	1990	— —	— —	— —	— —	— —	— —	— —		Mystery Girl A Black & White Night Live
"I Drove All Night" "Forever Friends" (by Sheena Easton)	1992	— —	132 —	74 —	52 —	6 —	48 —	7 —	BPI: Silver	Nintendo: White Knuckle Scorin' (Note: "I Drove All Night" was also included on Orbison's album King of Hearts, and Easton's "Forever Friends" was originally from her album What Comes Naturally.)
"Crying" (with k.d. lang; reissue) "Falling"	1992	40 —	71 —	— —	— —	9 —	— —	13 —		King of Hearts In Dreams: The Greatest Hits
"Heartbreak Radio" "Crying" (with k.d. lang)	1992	— —	— —	31 —	69 —	— —	— —	36 —		King of Hearts
"Ooby Dooby" (1987 version) (Note: This re-recorded version of "Ooby Dooby" was only released as a single in the Netherlands.) "Ooby Dooby" (1955 version)	1996	— —	— —	— —	— —	— —	— —	— —		Non-album single (Note: "Ooby Dooby" was released to promote The Very Best of Roy Orbison; however neither version was properly included on the album. Instead, the album features a blended version of the two.)
"Oh, Pretty Woman" "Crying" (with the Royal Philharmonic Orchestra)	2017	— —	— —	— —	— —	— —	— —	— (Note: The partial re-recording/remix of "Oh, Pretty Woman" with the Royal Philharmonic Orchestra did not chart on the UK Official Singles Chart but did chart on two UK sub-charts: it peaked at number one on both the UK Physical Singles Chart and the UK Vinyl Singles Sales Chart.) —		A Love So Beautiful
"—" denotes releases that did not chart or were not released in that territory.

== Videos ==
=== Video albums ===
Title	Album details	Peak chart positions				Certifications
Title	Album details	US	AUS	NL	UK	Certifications
12 of His Greatest Hits	Released: 1986; Label: Simitar Entertainment; Formats: VHS	—	—	—	—	
Live in Concert	Released: 1988; Label: Maverick Productions; Formats: VHS; Europe-only release	—	—	—	—	
A Black & White Night	Released: May 1988; Label: HBO Video; Formats: VHS, LD	6	2 (Note: Peak position in 2001.)	6	3 (Note: Chart position in 2025.)	RIAA: Gold; ARIA: 11× Platinum; BPI: Platinum; MC: Platinum
Live Texas 86	Released: 1989; Label: Stadium; Formats: VHS	—	—	—	—	
The Anthology	Released: April 1999; Label: White Star; Formats: VHS, DVD	—	—	—	8 (Note: Peak position in 2006. Peaked at number 13 upon initial release.)	BPI: Gold
Live at Austin City Limits August 5, 1982	Released: April 2001; Label: Orbison; Formats: VHS, DVD	—	5 (Note: Peak position in 2007.)	25	39 (Note: Peak position in 2021)	ARIA: 2× Platinum
In Dreams – The Roy Orbison Story	Released: 2001; Label: Wienerworld Presentation; Formats: DVD	—	4	—	3 (Note: Peak position in 2006.)	ARIA: Platinum
Greatest Hits	Released: September 2003; Label: Eagle Vision; Formats: DVD	—	—	—	33	ARIA: Gold; MC: Gold
Live from Australia	Released: April 5, 2005; Label: Image Entertainment; Formats: DVD	—	30	—	—	ARIA: Platinum
Running Scared	Released: September 2006; Label: All Stars; Formats: DVD; Europe-only release	—	—	—	—	
"—" denotes releases that did not chart or were not released in that territory.

=== Music videos ===
Title	Year	Director
"Oh, Pretty Woman"	1964	Stanley Dorfman
"There Won't Be Many More Comin' Home"	1966	Unknown
"Walk On"	1968	Unknown
"Wild Hearts"	1985	Bernard Rose
"In Dreams"	1987	Leslie Libman
"Crying"	1987	Leslie Libman
"You Got It"	1989	Leslie Libman
"She's a Mystery to Me"	1989	David Fincher
"California Blue"	1989	Unknown
"A Love So Beautiful"	1989	Matt Mahurin
I Drove All Night"	1992	Peter Care
"Heartbreak Radio"	1992	Unknown
"The Way Is Love"	2014	Unknown
"One of the Lonely Ones"	2016	Michael Lawrence and Alana Lawrence

== Collaborations and guest appearances ==
- "Find My Baby for Me" – Sonny Burgess
- "I Was a Fool" – Ken Cook
- "Jenny" – Ken Cook
- "I Fell in Love" – Ken Cook
- "Rockabilly Gal" – Hayden Thompson
- "Greenback Dollar", "Watch and Chain" – Ray Harris
- "Cast Iron Arm" – Johnny Wilson
- "You've Got Love" – Johnny Wilson
- "Don't Do Me This Way" – Ricky Tucker (erroneously reported as being with Buddy Holly)
- "Patty Baby" – Ricky Tucker (erroneously reported as being with Buddy Holly)
- "Fools like Me" – Jerry Lee Lewis
- "No One Really Cares" – Kris Jensen
- "Shook Up" – Joe Melson
- "Dance" – Joe Melson
- "I'm in a Blue Mood" – Conway Twitty
- "Tennessee Owns My Soul" – Bill Dees
- "I Belong to Him" – Jessi Colter with Waylon Jennings
- "Indian Summer" – Gatlin Brothers & Barry Gibb
- "Leah" – Bertie Higgins
- "Beyond the End" – Jimmy Buffett
- "Zombie Zoo" – Tom Petty
- "Life Fades Away" – Written by Glenn Danzig
- "Crying" – k.d. lang
- "Zigzag" on Zig Zag (Original Motion Picture Score) (MGM, 1970)

== Bibliography ==
- Amburn, Ellis (1990). Dark Star: The Roy Orbison Story. Carol Publishing Group. ISBN 0-8184-0518-X.
- Escott, CE (1992). Good Rockin' Tonight: Sun Records and the Birth of Rock 'n' Roll. New York, N.Y.: St.Martin's Press. ISBN 0-312-08199-5.
- Orbison, Roy Jr. (2017). The Authorized Roy Orbison. Orbison, Wesley; Orbison, Alex; Slate, Jeff. New York, NY: Center Street. ISBN 978-1-478-97654-7. OCLC 1017566749.
