= The Essential Roy Orbison =

2006 album by Roy Orbison

Compilation album by Roy Orbison
- Released: March 28, 2006
- Recorded: 1955–1988
- Genre: Pop rock, rock and roll, country
- Length: 1:57:46
- Label: Orbison Records; Monument Records; Legacy Records; Sony Music
- Producer: Fred Foster; Wesley Rose; Jim Vienneau; Roy Orbison; David Lynch; Michael Utley; T Bone Burnett; Mike Campbell; Jeff Lynne; Barbara Orbison; Bono

Roy Orbison chronology
The Platinum Collection (2004)	The Essential Roy Orbison (2006)	The Very Best of Roy Orbison (2006 release) (2006)

Professional ratings
Review scores
Source	Rating
AllMusic	4.5/5 stars
PopMatters	8/10 stars
The Music Box	4/5 stars

The Essential Roy Orbison is a compilation album by American singer-songwriter Roy Orbison, released on March 28, 2006. It is part of Sony BMG's Essential series of compilation albums and includes tracks of Orbison's biggest hits from 1956 to 1992.

== Track listing ==
=== Disc one ===
No.	Title	Writer(s)	Originally from	Length
1.	"Ooby Dooby"	Wade Moore, Dick Penner	Non-album single A-side (1956), later included on Roy Orbison at the Rock House (1961)	2:12
2.	"Go Go Go"	Roy Orbison	Non-album single (1956), B-side of "Ooby Dooby"	2:08
3.	"Rock House"	Harold Jenkins, Roy Orbison (attributed to Harold Jenkins, Sam Phillips)	Non-album single (1956), later included on Roy Orbison at the Rock House (1961)	2:05
4.	"Uptown"	Roy Orbison, Joe Melson	Non-album single (1960), later included on Roy Orbison's Greatest Hits (1962)	2:08
5.	"Only the Lonely"	Roy Orbison, Joe Melson	Lonely and Blue (1961)	2:26
6.	"Blue Angel"	Roy Orbison, Joe Melson	Lonely and Blue (1961)	2:52
7.	"I'm Hurting"	Roy Orbison, Joe Melson	Lonely and Blue (1961)	2:44
8.	"Lana"	Roy Orbison, Joe Melson	Crying (1962)	2:18
9.	"Love Hurts"	Boudleaux Bryant	Crying (1962)	2:28
10.	"Crying"	Roy Orbison, Joe Melson	Crying (1962)	2:47
11.	"Candy Man"	Beverly Ross, Fred Neil	Roy Orbison's Greatest Hits (1962)	2:45
12.	"Dream Baby"	Cindy Walker	Roy Orbison's Greatest Hits (1962)	2:33
13.	"The Crowd"	Roy Orbison, Joe Melson	Roy Orbison's Greatest Hits (1962)	2:23
14.	"Leah"	Roy Orbison	More of Roy Orbison's Greatest Hits (1964)	2:40
15.	"Falling"	Roy Orbison	In Dreams (Bonus Tracks) (1963)	2:23
16.	"Working for the Man"	Roy Orbison	More of Roy Orbison's Greatest Hits (1964)	2:26
17.	"Mean Woman Blues"	Claude Demetrius	In Dreams (Bonus Tracks) (1963)	2:25
18.	"Blue Bayou"	Roy Orbison, Joe Melson	In Dreams (1963)	2:31
19.	"Pretty Paper"	Willie Nelson	In Dreams (Bonus Tracks) (1963)	2:45
20.	"It's Over"	Roy Orbison, Bill Dees	More of Roy Orbison's Greatest Hits (1964)	2:48
21.	"Oh, Pretty Woman"	Roy Orbison, Bill Dees	Orbisongs (1965)	2:56

=== Disc two ===
No.	Title	Writer(s)	Originally from	Length
1.	"You Got It"	Roy Orbison, Jeff Lynne, Tom Petty	Mystery Girl (1989)	3:31
2.	"She's a Mystery to Me"	Bono, The Edge	Mystery Girl (1989)	4:16
3.	"California Blue"	Roy Orbison, Jeff Lynne, Tom Petty	Mystery Girl (1989)	3:57
4.	"The Only One"	Wesley Orbison, Craig Wiseman	Mystery Girl (1989)	3:52
5.	"Ride Away"	Roy Orbison, Bill Dees	There Is Only One Roy Orbison (1965)	3:28
6.	"Crawling Back"	Roy Orbison, Bill Dees	The Orbison Way (1966)	3:14
7.	"Best Friend"	Roy Orbison, Bill Dees	The Fastest Guitar Alive (1967)	2:37
8.	"Communication Breakdown"	Roy Orbison, Bill Dees	Cry Softly Lonely One (1967)	3:38
9.	"Walk On"	Roy Orbison, Bill Dees	Roy Orbison's Many Moods (1969)	2:53
10.	"That Lovin' You Feelin' Again" (featuring Emmylou Harris)	Roy Orbison, Chris Price	Roadie soundtrack (1980)	4:01
11.	"Running Scared [1985 Version]"	Roy Orbison, Joe Melson	In Dreams: The Greatest Hits (1987)	2:14
12.	"In Dreams [1987 Version]"	Roy Orbison	In Dreams: The Greatest Hits (1987)	2:50
13.	"A Love So Beautiful"	Roy Orbison, Jeff Lynne	Mystery Girl (1989)	3:33
14.	"The Comedians (Live)"	Elvis Costello	A Black & White Night Live (1989)	3:32
15.	"Claudette (Live)"	Roy Orbison	A Black & White Night Live (1999 reissue)	3:02
16.	"I Drove All Night"	Billy Steinberg, Tom Kelly	King of Hearts (1992)	3:46
17.	"Wild Hearts Run Out of Time"	Roy Orbison, Will Jennings	Non-album single (1985), later included on King of Hearts (1992)	3:33
18.	"Coming Home"	Roy Orbison, Will Jennings, JD Souther	Class of '55 (1986), later included on King of Hearts (1992)	4:02
19.	"Life Fades Away"	Roy Orbison, Glenn Danzig	Less than Zero (1987)	3:41

== Charts ==
Chart (2006)	Peak position
Australian Albums (ARIA)	39
Belgian Albums (Ultratop Flanders)	13
Dutch Albums (Album Top 100)	35
Finnish Albums (Suomen virallinen lista)	8
Norwegian Albums (VG-lista)	6
Swedish Albums (Sverigetopplistan)	5

== Certifications ==
Region	Certification	Certified units/sales
Australia (ARIA)	2× Platinum	140,000^{^}
^{^} Shipments figures based on certification alone.

== Release history ==
Country	Date	Label	Format	Catalog
United States	March 28, 2006	Orbison Records, Monument Records, Legacy Records, Sony Music	CD, digital download	1060521507
Australia	July 29, 2006	Sony Music, Legacy Records	CD	2008653/169836
