= The All-Time Greatest Hits of Roy Orbison =

All-Time Greatest Hits

Greatest hits album by Roy Orbison
- Released: 1972
- Genre: Rockabilly, country, pop
- Length: 52:20
- Label: Monument
- Producer: Fred Foster

Roy Orbison chronology
| Hank Williams: The Roy Orbison Way (1970) | All-Time Greatest Hits (1972) | Roy Orbison Sings (1972) |

All-Time Greatest Hits is a 2-LP compilation album by Roy Orbison released in 1972, featuring the original Monument Records recordings. The album was re-released on compact disc by CBS Records in 1989. The album was given a high-quality digital remastering from the original analog master tapes by Steve Hoffman for DCC Compact Classics, Inc. in 1997, catalog number GZS-1118. In 2008, Mobile Fidelity Sound Lab (MFSL) released a half-speed mastered, limited edition, 2-LP version on 180 gm. vinyl, catalog number MFSL 2–304. This MFSL release, remastered by Rob LoVerde and Shawn R. Britton, has received positive reviews for sound quality.

The album received Gold certification from the Recording Industry Association of America on July 13, 1990, and Platinum certification was awarded on August 29, 2001

== Reception ==
Professional ratings
Review scores
| Source | Rating |
|---|---|
| AllMusic | 3/5 stars |
| The Encyclopedia of Popular Music | 5/5 stars |
| The Rolling Stone Album Guide | 5/5 stars |
| MusicHound | 4/5 stars |

Stephen Thomas Erlewine described the album as "an excellent and entertaining compilation"

== Track listing ==
Side 1
| No. | Title | Writer(s) | Original album | Length |
|---|---|---|---|---|
| 1. | "Only the Lonely" (1960) | Orbison, Joe Melson | Lonely and Blue | 2:26 |
| 2. | "Leah" (1962) | Orbison | More of Roy Orbison's Greatest Hits | 2:25 |
| 3. | "In Dreams" (1963) | Orbison | In Dreams | 2:48 |
| 4. | "Uptown" (1959) | Orbison, Melson | Roy Orbison's Greatest Hits | 2:06 |
| 5. | "It's Over" (1964) | Orbison, Bill Dees | More of Roy Orbison's Greatest Hits | 2:46 |

Side 2
| No. | Title | Writer(s) | Original album | Length |
|---|---|---|---|---|
| 1. | "Crying" (1961) | Orbison, Melson | Crying | 2:45 |
| 2. | "Dream Baby" (1962) | Cindy Walker | Roy Orbison's Greatest Hits | 2:32 |
| 3. | "Blue Angel" (1960) | Orbison, Melson | Lonely and Blue | 2:50 |
| 4. | "Working for the Man" (1962) | Orbison | More of Roy Orbison's Greatest Hits | 2:38 |
| 5. | "Candy Man" (1961) | Beverly Ross, Fred Neil | Roy Orbison's Greatest Hits | 2:44 |

Side 3
| No. | Title | Writer(s) | Original album | Length |
|---|---|---|---|---|
| 1. | "Running Scared" (1961) | Orbison, Melson | Crying | 2:11 |
| 2. | "Falling" (1963) | Orbison | More of Roy Orbison's Greatest Hits | 2:22 |
| 3. | "Love Hurts" (1961) | Boudleaux Bryant | Crying | 2:28 |
| 4. | "Shahdaroba" (1963) | Cindy Walker | In Dreams | 2:39 |
| 5. | "I'm Hurtin'" (1960) | Orbison, Melson | Lonely and Blue | 2:42 |

Side 4
| No. | Title | Writer(s) | Original album | Length |
|---|---|---|---|---|
| 1. | "Mean Woman Blues" (1963) | Claude DeMetrius | More of Roy Orbison's Greatest Hits | 2:24 |
| 2. | "Pretty Paper" (1963) | Willie Nelson | More of Roy Orbison's Greatest Hits | 2:45 |
| 3. | "The Crowd" (1962) | Orbison, Melson | Roy Orbison's Greatest Hits | 2:22 |
| 4. | "Blue Bayou" (1963) | Orbison, Melson | In Dreams | 2:26 |
| 5. | "Oh, Pretty Woman" (1964) | Orbison, Dees | Orbisongs | 2:56 |
