= Live at Austin City Limits =

Live album by Roy Orbison
- Released: 2001
- Recorded: August 5, 1982
- Venue: Austin City Limits
- Length: 60:00
- Label: Image Entertainment

Roy Orbison chronology
| Love Songs (2000) | Live at Austin City Limits (2001) | In Dreams - The Roy Orbison Story (2001) |

Live at Austin City Limits is a DVD released by Image Entertainment in 2003. The set captures a live performance by singer Roy Orbison on August 5, 1982, from the PBS television show Austin City Limits.

Orbison was the first "legend" to appear on the weekly series, which, at the time, featured local Texas performers. It is said that Orbison's appearance on the show paved the way for other legends such as Ray Charles, Marty Robbins, and even Johnny Cash to appear on the series. Unfortunately, Orbison was recovering from recent triple bypass heart surgery and also had a head cold on the day so his voice was not as strong as it was usually.

The DVD is 60 minutes long. Extras include "Roy Orbinson: The Wink Years", a seven-minute documentary about the desolation of his hometown and his band in high schoo, as well as an interactive photo gallery.

== Track listing ==
- "Only the Lonely"
- "Leah"
- "Dream Baby"
- "In Dreams"
- "Mean Woman Blues"
- "Blue Angel"
- "Lana"
- "Blue Bayou"
- "Candy Man"
- "Crying"
- "Crying" (reprise)
- "Ooby Dooby"
- "Hound Dog Man"
  one of the few times he performed this 1979 tribute to his friend Elvis Presley
- "Working for the Man"
- "That Lovin' You Feelin' Again" (Grammy winning duet from 1980)
- "Go Go Go (Down the Line)"
- "It's Over"
- "Oh, Pretty Woman"
- "Running Scared"
- "Running Scared" (reprise)
