= 16 Biggest Hits (Roy Orbison album) =

Greatest hits album by Roy Orbison
- Released: February 9, 1999
- Recorded: March 25, 1960 – August 1, 1964
- Genre: Rockabilly, country, pop rock
- Length: 41:32
- Label: Legacy Recordings

Roy Orbison chronology
Oh, Pretty Woman: The Greatest Hits (1998)	16 Biggest Hits (1999)	20 Golden Hits (2000)

Professional ratings
Review scores
Source	Rating
Allmusic	5/5 stars

16 Biggest Hits is a 1999 Roy Orbison compilation album. It is part of a series of similar 16 Biggest Hits albums released by Legacy Recordings.

The album was certified Gold in 2005 by the RIAA. It has sold 830,000 copies in the US as of May 2013.

== Track listing ==
1. "Only the Lonely" (Roy Orbison, Joe Melson) – 2:26
2. "Blue Angel" (Orbison, Melson) – 2:51
3. "I'm Hurtin'" (Orbison, Melson) – 2:42
4. "Running Scared" (Orbison, Melson) – 2:12
5. "Crying" (Orbison, Melson) – 2:46
6. "Candy Man" (Fred Neil, Beverly Ross) – 2:45
7. "Dream Baby (How Long Must I Dream)" (Cindy Walker) – 2:33
8. "The Crowd" (Orbison, Melson) – 2:24
9. "Leah" (Orbison) – 2:40
10. "Workin' for the Man" (Orbison) – 2:20
11. "In Dreams" (Orbison) – 2:49
12. "Falling" (Orbison) – 2:23
13. "Mean Woman Blues" (Claude Demetrius) – 2:25
14. "Blue Bayou" (Orbison, Melson) – 2:31
15. "It's Over" (Orbison, Bill Dees) – 2:48
16. "Oh, Pretty Woman" (Orbison, Dees) – 2:57

== Chart performance ==
16 Biggest Hits peaked at #47 on the U.S. Billboard Top Country Albums chart the week of February 10, 2001.

Chart (1999–2001)	Peak position
U.S. Billboard Top Country Albums	47

== Certifications ==
Region	Certification	Certified units/sales
United States (RIAA)	Gold	830,000
