= A Love So Beautiful (album) =

2017 compilation album by Roy Orbison

Compilation album by Roy Orbison with the Royal Philharmonic Orchestra
- Released: November 3, 2017
- Recorded: December 2016, February 2017
- Studio: Abbey Road Studio 2, London, England; RAK Studios, London, England; Shine Studios, Salisbury, England
- Genre: Orchestral pop
- Length: 54:05
- Label: Roy's Boys; Monument; Legacy; Sony
- Producer: Nick Patrick; Don Reedman; Wesley Orbison (exec.); Roy Orbison Jr. (exec.); Alex Orbison (exec.); Chuck Fleckenstein (exec.); John Jackson (exec.)

Roy Orbison with the Royal Philharmonic Orchestra chronology
| The Ultimate Collection (2016) | A Love So Beautiful (2017) | Unchained Melodies (2018) |

A Love So Beautiful is a compilation album by American singer Roy Orbison. It was released on November 3, 2017 by Roy's Boys, Monument, Legacy, Sony. The album features archival vocal recordings of Orbison accompanied by new orchestral arrangements by the Royal Philharmonic Orchestra. It also features a duet with English country duo Ward Thomas.

A Love So Beautiful debuted and peaked at number 2 on the UK Albums Chart, becoming Orbison's highest charting album for almost 30 years.

"Oh, Pretty Woman" opens with a guitar strum played by Orbison's grandson Roy III, then aged about ten months.

== Track listing ==
| No. | Title | Writer(s) | Length |
|---|---|---|---|
| 1. | "In Dreams" | Roy Orbison | 3:47 |
| 2. | "Crying" | Roy Orbison, Joe Melson | 3:00 |
| 3. | "I'm Hurtin'" | Roy Orbison, Joe Melson | 2:47 |
| 4. | "Oh, Pretty Woman" | Roy Orbison, Bill Dees | 3:08 |
| 5. | "It's Over" | Roy Orbison, Bill Dees | 3:19 |
| 6. | "Dream Baby" | Cindy Walker | 2:54 |
| 7. | "Blue Angel" | Roy Orbison, Joe Melson | 2:58 |
| 8. | "Love Hurts" | Boudleaux Bryant | 2:40 |
| 9. | "Uptown" | Roy Orbison, Joe Melson | 2:17 |
| 10. | "Mean Woman Blues" | Claude Demetrius | 2:26 |
| 11. | "Only the Lonely (Know the Way I Feel)" | Roy Orbison, Joe Melson | 2:32 |
| 12. | "Running Scared" | Roy Orbison, Joe Melson | 2:48 |
| 13. | "I Drove All Night" | Billy Steinberg, Tom Kelly | 4:15 |
| 14. | "You Got It" | Roy Orbison, Jeff Lynne, Tom Petty | 3:36 |
| 15. | "A Love So Beautiful" | Roy Orbison, Jeff Lynne | 4:12 |
| 16. | "Pretty Paper" | Willie Nelson | 3:23 |
| 17. | "I Drove All Night" (duet with Ward Thomas) | Billy Steinberg, Tom Kelly | 4:03 |

== Charts and certifications ==
=== Charts ===
| Chart (2017) | Peak position |
|---|---|
| Australian Albums (ARIA) | 9 |
| Belgian Albums (Ultratop Flanders) | 53 |
| Belgian Albums (Ultratop Wallonia) | 136 |
| Dutch Albums (Album Top 100) | 120 |
| New Zealand Albums (RMNZ) | 9 |
| UK Albums (OCC) | 2 |
| US Billboard 200 | 151 |

=== Certifications ===
| Region | Certification | Certified units/sales |
|---|---|---|
| United Kingdom (BPI) | Platinum | 300,000^{‡} |
^{‡} Sales+streaming figures based on certification alone.
