= The Great Songs of Roy Orbison =

Compilation album by Roy Orbison
- Released: February 1970
- Recorded: 1965–1969
- Genre: Rockabilly, country
- Label: MGM (SE 4659)
- Producer: Wesley Rose, Jim Vienneau

Roy Orbison chronology
The Big O (1970)	The Great Songs of Roy Orbison (1970)	Hank Williams: The Roy Orbison Way (1970)

Professional ratings
Review scores
Source	Rating
The Encyclopedia of Popular Music	4/5 stars
Billboard	4/5 stars

The Great Songs of Roy Orbison is an album recorded by Roy Orbison for MGM Records released in the United States in February 1970, and was available both in stereo and mono.

It features mostly a collection of previously released MGM Singles, including "Ride Away", Breakin' Up is Breakin' My Heart", and "Cry Softly Lonely One"

== Track listing ==
All tracks composed by Roy Orbison and Bill Dees, except where indicated

Side one

1. "Breakin' Up Is Breakin' My Heart" (P) 1966
2. "Cry Softly Lonely One" (Joe Melson, Don Gant) (P) 1967
3. "Penny Arcade" (Sammy King) (P) 1969
4. "Ride Away" (P) 1965
5. "Southbound Jericho Parkway" (Bobby Bond) (P) 1969

Side two

1. "Crawling Back" (P) 1965
2. "Heartache" (P) 1968
3. "Too Soon to Know" (Don Gibson) (P) 1966
4. "My Friend" (P) 1966
5. "Here Comes the Rain, Baby" (Mickey Newbury) (P) 1967

Produced by Wesley Rose and Jim Vienneau
except "My Friend" & "Southbound Jericho Parkway" Produced by Don Gant
Arrangers: Bill McElhiney, Jim Hall, Emory Gordy, Jr., Tupper Saussy
