= The Classic Roy Orbison =

Studio album by Roy Orbison
- Released: July 1966
- Genre: Rock
- Length: 27:58
- Label: MGM
- Producers: Wesley Rose, Jim Vienneau

Roy Orbison chronology
The Orbison Way (1966)	The Classic Roy Orbison (1966)	Roy Orbison Sings Don Gibson (1967)

Singles from The Classic Roy Orbison
- 1. "Twinkle Toes" Released: April 1966

The Classic Roy Orbison is the ninth studio album recorded by Roy Orbison, and his third for MGM Records, released in July 1966, and was available both in stereo and mono. The single taken from it, "Twinkle Toes", was Orbison's last US top-forty single during his lifetime, scraping in at No. 39. It reached No. 24 in Australia and No. 29 in the UK. The album spent eight weeks on the album chart in the UK, peaking at number 12.

The album was released on compact disc by Diablo Records on October 5, 2004, as tracks 1 through 12 on a pairing of two albums on one CD with tracks 13 through 24 consisting Orbison's 1967 album, Cry Softly Lonely One. Classic Roy Orbison was included in a box set entitled The MGM Years 1965-1973 - Roy Orbison, which contains 12 of his MGM studio albums, 1 compilation, and was released on December 4, 2015.

== History ==
Some of the songs were leftovers from The Orbison Way sessions.

== Reception ==
Professional ratings
Review scores
Source	Rating
AllMusic	3.5/5 stars
The Encyclopedia of Popular Music	2/5 stars
Record Mirror	4/5 stars

Bruce Eder of AllMusic felt that "Every song was cast in a familiar, classic Orbison vein, without any of the country piano sounds that showed a digression on recent releases, and most of it — especially "Just Another Name for Rock and Roll" — had a beat, this is stripped-down, back-to-basics Orbison", calling the album "the best album be ever did for the label"

Billboard described the album as "one of his best albums to date" with "dynamic Orbison performances"

Cashbox gave a positive review, saying that Orbison "ranges from rhythmic danceables ('Just Another Name for Rock And Roll") to dramatic, emotional ballads ('Wait')."

Variety mentions "He demonstrates his style on ballads".

Record Mirror gave the album a positive review, saying Orbison "swings in the way of contemporaries"

== Track listing ==
All tracks composed by Roy Orbison and Bill Dees, except where indicated.

Side one
No.	Title	Length
1.	"You'll Never Be Sixteen Again"	2:50
2.	"Pantomime"	2:53
3.	"Twinkle Toes"	2:37
4.	"Losing You"	2:43
5.	"City Life"	2:47
6.	"Wait"	2:17

Side two
No.	Title	Writer(s)	Length
1.	"Growing Up"		2:46
2.	"Where Is Tomorrow"		2:45
3.	"(No) I'll Never Get Over You"	Orbison	2:10
4.	"Going Back to Gloria"		2:46
5.	"Just Another Name for Rock and Roll"	Bill Dees	2:09
6.	"Never Love Again"	Rusty Kershaw, Doug Kershaw	2:10

- Produced by Wesley Rose and Jim Vienneau
- Engineered by Val Valentin

== Charts ==
=== Album ===
Chart (1966)	Peak position
UK Albums Chart	12

=== Singles ===
Year	Title	US Hot 100	US Cashbox	CAN	UK
1966	"Twinkle Toes"	39	40	25	29
