= There Is Only One Roy Orbison =

Studio album by Roy Orbison
- Released: August 1965
- Studio: RCA Studios, Nashville, Tennessee
- Genre: Rock and roll
- Length: 28:15
- Label: MGM
- Producer: Wesley Rose, Jim Vienneau

Roy Orbison chronology
Early Orbison (1964)	There Is Only One Roy Orbison (1965)	Orbisongs (1965)

Singles from There Is Only One Roy Orbison
- 1. "Ride Away" Released: 1965

There Is Only One Roy Orbison is the seventh album recorded by Roy Orbison, and his first for MGM Records, released in July 1965, and was available both in stereo and mono. It features his studio recording of "Claudette", an Orbison-penned song which had become a hit for the Everly Brothers in 1958. Ironically, at the time he recorded the song in 1965, he had divorced his wife Claudette, who had inspired the lyrics. Orbison later re-recorded the song for In Dreams: The Greatest Hits in 1985. (They later reconciled in 1966, before her death in a motorcycle accident in June of that year near Galatin, Tennessee.) The single taken from the album was "Ride Away", which reached no. 25 in the US charts, no. 12 in Australia and no. 34 in the UK. Cash Box described "Ride Away" as a "rhythmic teen-angled ode about a somewhat ego-oriented lad who cuts-out on romance." Bear Family included the track "Ride Away" in the 2001 Orbison 1955-1965 box set.

The album was released on compact disc by Diablo Records on October 5, 2004, as tracks 1 through 12 on a pairing of two albums on one CD with tracks 13 through 24 consisting of Orbison's 1966 album, The Orbison Way. There Is Only One was included in a box set entitled The MGM Years 1965-1973 - Roy Orbison, which contains 12 of his MGM studio albums, 1 compilation, and was released on December 4, 2015.

== History ==
In 1965, Roy Orbison was riding high with the hit single "Oh, Pretty Woman", which was No. 1 globally, when word got about that his Monument contract was due to expire in June. Orbison was interested in Hollywood and signed to MGM Records for $1 million for three albums per year from 1965-1985. Half of the money went to Decca's London Records. He also was looking for freedom when he signed with the label. His producer for Monument Records, Fred Foster and Orbison's manager Wesley Rose were having disagreements about whether or not to keep Orbison. This album charted at No. 10 in the UK and No. 55 (No. 41 on Cash Box, while reaching the Top 30 on Record World) in the US. It was recorded at the RCA Studios in Nashville.

== Reception ==
Professional ratings
Review scores
Source	Rating
AllMusic	2/5 stars
Record Mirror	4/5 stars
The Encyclopedia of Popular Music	2/5 stars

Variety described the album as "an excellent performance", and notes "it features a solid group of contemporary ballads". Billboard described the album as "a first-rate fashion destined", saying "Ride Away" and "I'm in a Blue Mood" are standout performances". Cashbox noted that Orbison "makes some powerful noise as he displays not only his exciting song styling, but also his adroitness with the composer's pen". Record Mirror described the album as "a good LP", saying the "vocals are really good, with Roy putting just about everything into it".

Richie Unterberger of AllMusic described the album as "unimpressive", noted Orbison "forsakes much of the rock & roll foundation of his classic early-'60s hits for Nashville country & western on most of the LP."

== Track listing ==
Side one
No.	Title	Writer(s)	Length
1.	"Ride Away"	Roy Orbison, Bill Dees	3:28
2.	"You Fool You"	Orbison, Joe Melson	2:10
3.	"Two of a Kind"	Bob Montgomery, Earl Sinks	2:37
4.	"This Is Your Song"	Dees	2:18
5.	"I'm in a Blue, Blue Mood"	Orbison, Melson	1:51
6.	"If You Can't Say Something Nice"	Orbison, Melson, Ray Rush	2:21

Side two
No.	Title	Writer(s)	Length
1.	"Claudette"	Orbison	2:01
2.	"Afraid to Sleep"	Buddy Buie, John Rainey Adkins	2:15
3.	"Sugar and Honey"	Orbison, Dees	2:22
4.	"Summer Love"	Dees, Mathis	2:29
5.	"Big as I Can Dream"	Bob Montgomery	2:08
6.	"Wondering"	Orbison, Dees	2:16

Produced by Wesley Rose & Jim Vienneau
