= Roy Orbison Sings Don Gibson =

Studio album by Roy Orbison
- Released: January 1967
- Genre: Country
- Length: 29:19
- Label: MGM
- Producers: Wesley Rose, Jim Vienneau

Roy Orbison chronology
The Classic Roy Orbison (1966)	Roy Orbison Sings Don Gibson (1967)	The Fastest Guitar Alive (1967)

Singles from Roy Orbison Sings Don Gibson
- 1. "Too Soon to Know" Released: July 1966

Roy Orbison Sings Don Gibson is a tribute album recorded by Roy Orbison for MGM Records. Released in January 1967, and was available both in stereo and mono. it is a collection of songs written by Country Music Hall of Fame singer/songwriter Don Gibson who, like Orbison, often wrote about the loneliness and sorrow that love can bring. Its one single, "Too Soon to Know", became a major hit in the UK, reaching no. 3 there in September 1966, and also reached no. 4 in Ireland and no. 27 in Australia. In Canada, the song only reached no. 71.

This album was titled Sweet Dreams in Africa.

The album was released on compact disc by Edsel Records on September 27, 2004 as tracks 1 through 12 on a pairing of two albums on one CD with tracks 13 through 22 consisting of Orbison's 1970 album, Hank Williams: The Roy Orbison Way. The album was also included in the 2015 box set The MGM Years 1965–1973 – Roy Orbison.

== History ==
A few of the songs were recorded before his first wife Claudette's death in a motor-bike accident in June 1966. The album was put on hold as Orbison was filming The Fastest Guitar Alive. "Too Soon To Know" was banned by the BBC as they felt it was too personal about Claudette's death. The album also included a new, re-recorded version of "(I'd Be) A Legend in My Time", which previously appeared on his 1960 album Lonely and Blue.

== Reception ==
Professional ratings
Review scores
Source	Rating
AllMusic	3/5 stars
The Encyclopedia of Popular Music	3/5 stars
Record Mirror	4/5 stars

Billboard selected the album for a "Pop Special Merit" review, and stated that Orbison "Does much better when he sticks to fresh, good material, and give them a twist that puts a fresh glow to listening." In its review of the album from February 1967, Cashbox stated that it "shows off his singing ability to good advantage." Record Mirror wrote "the combination of Roy's mellow, mature, and traditional tunes and the wonderful country-blues songs of Don Gibson comes across well on the album." Disc and Music Echo said that the album showed "Roy's super-dramatic delivery suits them well"

William Ruhlmann of AllMusic said that the album showed "Orbison's inspiration to go into the studio and record an entire LP of songs by Gibson, at the time a labelmate of his at MGM Records. It was a reasonable decision since, as with "Too Soon to Know," a widescreen romantic lament, Gibson's writing style suited Orbison's taste in heartbreak ballads".

== Track listing ==
All songs written by Don Gibson.

Side one
No.	Title	Length
1.	"(I'd Be) A Legend in My Time"	2:18
2.	"(Yes) I'm Hurting"	2:15
3.	"The Same Street"	2:18
4.	"Far, Far Away"	2:10
5.	"Big Hearted Me"	1:52
6.	"Sweet Dreams"	3:06

Side two
No.	Title	Length
1.	"Oh, Such a Stranger"	3:20
2.	"Blue Blue Day"	2:10
3.	"What About Me?"	2:08
4.	"Give Myself a Party"	2:30
5.	"Too Soon to Know"	2:48
6.	"Lonesome Number One"	2:24

Arranged by Bill McElhiney

== Charts ==
=== Singles ===
Year	Title	U.S. Hot 100	U.S. Cashbox	CAN	UK
1966	"Too Soon to Know"	68	62	71	3
