= Cry Softly Lonely One =

Studio album by Roy Orbison
- Released: October 1967
- Genre: Rock
- Length: 24:18
- Label: MGM
- Producers: Wesley Rose, Jim Vienneau

Roy Orbison chronology
The Fastest Guitar Alive (1967)	Cry Softly Lonely One (1967)	Roy Orbison's Many Moods (1969)

Singles from Cry Softly Lonely One
- 1. "Communication Breakdown" Released: November 1966; 2. "Cry Softly Lonely One" Released: July 1967; 3. "She" Released: October 1967

Cry Softly Lonely One is the twelfth music album recorded by Roy Orbison, and his sixth for MGM Records. The album was released in October 1967, and was available both in stereo and mono. and included two singles: "Communication Breakdown" and the title tune, both of which were minor hits in the States early that year. "Communication Breakdown" did much better in Australia, where it reached No. 9 in February. According to the official Roy Orbison biography, the London Records release (non U.S.) of this album featured the extra track "Just One Time".

The album was released on compact disc by Diablo Records on October 5, 2004, as tracks 12 through 24 on a pairing of two albums on one CD with tracks 1 through 12 consisting of Orbison's 1966 album, The Classic Roy Orbison. Cry Softly Lonely One was included in a box set entitled The MGM Years 1965-1973 - Roy Orbison, which contains 12 of his MGM studio albums, 1 compilation, and was released on December 4, 2015.

== Reception ==
Professional ratings
Review scores
Source	Rating
Allmusic	4/5 stars
Record Mirror	4/5 stars
The Encyclopedia of Popular Music	2/5 stars

William Ruhlmann of AllMusic wrote that this album "was an anachronism (the other irony is that, had it come out 18 months later, it might have ridden the same roots rock wave as Elvis Presley's Memphis albums, or Joe South, to success). Some of it, such as "That's a No No," was a true throwback to an earlier pop/rock era, but most of what was here was a great showcase for Orbison's classic sound as it had evolved, oblivious to the musical trends around him"

Variety states "Orbison's supple tenor pipers get an excellent workout in this set of new ballads."

Record Mirror felt that "His voice tackles this collection of mostly gentle songs well, but it is a pity that several 'teen' songs are included, seemingly from the chewing-gum blue jeans era."

== Track listing ==
Side one
No.	Title	Writer(s)	Length
1.	"She"	Roy Orbison, Bill Dees	2:38
2.	"Communication Breakdown"	Roy Orbison, Bill Dees	2:57
3.	"Cry Softly, Lonely One"	Don Gant, Joe Melson	2:52
4.	"Girl Like Mine"	Mark Mathis	2:20
5.	"It Takes One (To Know One)"	Roy Orbison, Bill Dees	2:56
6.	"Just Let Me Make Believe"	Ronald Blackwell	2:23

Side two
No.	Title	Writer(s)	Length
1.	"Here Comes The Rain, Baby"	Mickey Newbury	2:50
2.	"That's A No-No"	Roy Orbison, Bill Dees	2:42
3.	"Memories"	Roy Orbison, Bill Dees	2:48
4.	"Time To Cry"	Roy Orbison, Bill Dees	2:38
5.	"Only Alive"	Ronald Blackwell, Dewayne Blackwell	2:04
6.	"Just One Time" (included on the London Records release only)	Don Gibson	2:14

== Charts ==
=== Singles ===
Year	Title	U.S. Hot 100	U.S. Cashbox	CAN	AUS
1966	"Communication Breakdown"	60	70	64	8
1967	"Cry Softly Lonely One"	52	45	29	10
1967	"She"	119	118	-	23

== Production ==
- Tracks 1, 3, 5, 7, 8, 10 arranged by Jim Hall
- Tracks 6, 11, 12 arranged by Bill McElhiney
- Jack Anesh – cover design
- Murray Laden – cover photography
