= The Orbison Way =

Studio album by Roy Orbison
- Released: January 1966
- Genre: Rock and roll
- Length: 27:11
- Label: MGM
- Producers: Wesley Rose, Jim Vienneau

Roy Orbison chronology
Orbisongs (1965)	The Orbison Way (1966)	The Classic Roy Orbison (1966)

Singles from The Orbison Way
- 1. "Crawling Back" Released: October 11, 1965; 2. "Breakin' Up Is Breakin' My Heart" Released: January 22, 1966

The Orbison Way is the eighth album recorded by Roy Orbison, and his second for MGM Records, released in January 1966, and was available both in stereo and mono. Two singles were taken from the album — "Crawling Back" and "Breakin' Up Is Breakin' My Heart" — both of which were chart hits in England, the US and Australia.

== Releases ==
The album was released on compact disc by Diablo Records on October 5, 2004, as tracks 12 through 24 on a pairing of two albums on one CD with tracks 1 through 12 consisting of Orbison's debut MGM album, There Is Only One Roy Orbison. The Orbison Way was included in a box set entitled The MGM Years 1965-1973 - Roy Orbison, which contains 12 of his MGM studio albums, 1 compilation, and was released on December 4, 2015.

== Chart performance ==
The album debuted on the Billboard Top LPs chart in the issue dated March 5, 1966, and remained on the chart for three weeks, peaking at number 128. It debuted on the Cashbox Looking Ahead albums chart in the issue dated February 12, 1966, and remained on the chart for seven weeks, peaking at number 107. In the UK, it spent ten weeks on the Record Retailer albums chart, peaking at number 11.

== Reception ==
Professional ratings
Review scores
Source	Rating
AllMusic	3.5/5 stars
Record Mirror	4/5 stars
The Encyclopedia of Popular Music	2/5 stars

=== Retrospective reviews ===
Bruce Eder of AllMusic said that the album "allow Orbison to open up vocally as never before, casting him in an almost operatic setting, in terms of emotional pitch, though the material itself is pure pop/rock with some elements of country-pop. "The Loner" (co-authored by Adkins), "Maybe," "Breakin' Up Is Breakin' My Heart," "Time Changes Everything" and much of the rest here could have passed muster on any of Orbison's Monument albums, though some of the other songwriting and some of the stylistic choices are debatable." On the other hand, The Encyclopedia of Popular Music only gave the album a two-star rating.

=== Contemporary reviews ===
Billboard magazine noted that the dramatic "Time Changed Everything" is "exceptional" while the rhythm groove "It Wasn't Very Long Ago" is a "standout".

Cashbox gave the album a positive review, saying that Orbison "sings the songs in a casual and relaxed manner" The publication described "Crawling Back" as a "tender, slow-moving, laconic ode about a love-sick fella who'll go to any lengths to get his ex-gal back again." They described "Breakin' Up Is Breakin' My Heart" as a "medium-paced, full orked and chorus-backed soulful tearjerker about a lonely guy who's been singing the blues since his gal jilted him."

Variety mentions "Many of theses tunes have melodic scope of the big pop ballads."

Record Mirror gave the album a positive review, saying that "This is My Land" is great, "A New Star" is gently swinging, & "Why Hurt The One" is near vocal perfection".

== Track listing ==
All tracks composed by Roy Orbison and Bill Dees, except where indicated. Five of the songs feature his band, The Candy Men.

Side one
No.	Title	Writer(s)	Length
1.	"Crawling Back"		3:15
2.	"It Ain't No Big Thing"		2:22
3.	"Time Changed Everything"	Buddy Buie, John Rainey Adkins	2:09
4.	"This Is My Land"	Bill Dees	3:05
5.	"The Loner"	Bill Dees, John Rainey Adkins	2:24
6.	"Maybe"		2:24

Side two
No.	Title	Writer(s)	Length
1.	"Breakin' Up Is Breakin' My Heart"		2:09
2.	"Go Away"		3:03
3.	"A New Star"		2:58
4.	"Never"		2:15
5.	"It Wasn't Very Long Ago"	Barry Booth	2:33
6.	"Why Hurt the One Who Loves You?"		2:36

== Charts ==
=== Album ===
Chart (1965)	Peak position
US Top LPs (Billboard)	128
US Looking Ahead (Cashbox)	107
UK Record Retailer Top LPs	11

=== Singles ===
Year	Title	U.S. Hot 100	U.S. Cashbox	CAN	UK
1965	"Crawling Back"	49	36	2	19
1966	"Breakin' Up Is Breakin' My Heart"	31		2	22

== Production ==
- Produced by Wesley Rose and Jim Vienneau
- Arranged by Bill McElhiney
- Bill Malloy – engineer
- Val Valentin – director of engineering
- Ace Lehman – cover design
