= The Fastest Guitar Alive =

1967 film by Michael D. Moore

- Theatrical release poster by Frank Frazetta
- Directed by: Michael D. Moore
- Written by: Robert E. Kent
- Produced by: Sam Katzman
- Starring: Roy Orbison; Sammy Jackson; Maggie Pierce
- Cinematography: W. Wallace Kelley
- Edited by: Ben Lewis
- Music by: Roy Orbison; Bill Dees; Fred Karger
- Color process: Metrocolor
- Production company: Four Leaf Productions
- Distributed by: Metro-Goldwyn-Mayer
- Release date: September 1, 1967
- Running time: 87 minutes
- Country: United States
- Language: English

The Fastest Guitar Alive is a 1967 American musical comedy Western film directed by Michael D. Moore and starring singer Roy Orbison in his only acting role. The film features Orbison performing seven original songs, which appeared on his 1967 MGM album of the same name. His song "There Won't Be Many Coming Home" is featured in the 2015 western film The Hateful Eight.

== Plot ==
Near the end of the American Civil War, a Southern spy with a bullet-shooting guitar is given the task of robbing gold bullion from the United States Mint in San Francisco to help finance the ill-fated Confederacy's last-ditch war effort.

== Cast ==
- Roy Orbison as Johnny Banner
- Sammy Jackson as Steve Menlo
- Maggie Pierce as Flo Chesnut
- Joan Freeman as Sue Chesnut
- Lyle Bettger as Charlie
- John Doucette as Marshal Max Cooper
- Patricia Donahue as Stella DeWitt
- Ben Cooper as Deputy Rink
- Ben Lessy as Indian Chief
- Douglas Kennedy as Sheriff Joe Stedman
- Iron Eyes Cody as First Indian
- Sam the Sham as First Expressman

== Production and release ==
Filming began September 1966. Although Orbison was pleased with the film, it proved to be a critical and box office flop. While MGM had included five films in his contract, no more were made.

== Soundtrack ==
The Fastest Guitar Alive

Soundtrack album by Roy Orbison
- Released: June 1967
- Genre: Rock and roll
- Length: 22:27
- Label: MGM (E 4475)
- Producers: Wesley Rose & Jim Vienneau

Roy Orbison chronology
Roy Orbison Sings Don Gibson (1967)	The Fastest Guitar Alive (1967)	Cry Softly Lonely One (1967)

Singles from The Fastest Guitar Alive
- 1. "Pistolero" Released: July 1967

Professional ratings
Review scores
Source	Rating
Allmusic	3/5 stars
The Encyclopedia of Popular Music	1/5 stars
Record Mirror	3/5 stars

A soundtrack album for the film was released in June 1967 on MGM Records, and was available both in stereo and mono. It was the only album to consist entirely of Roy Orbison/Bill Dees originals. It features two singles, "There Won't Be Many Coming Home" and "Pistolero". In the UK, the song chosen as the single was "There Won't Be Many Coming Home"; it entered the singles chart there for the week of December 7, 1966, stayed around for nine weeks, peaking at number 12. It entered the Australian chart at its highest position of number 15 before slipping down the chart during its eight-week stay.

The album was also included in the 2015 box set The MGM Years 1965–1973 – Roy Orbison.

=== Reception ===
Richie Unterberger of AllMusic said the album "includes what may be his best obscure tune, the rarely anthologized 'Whirlwind.' With its galloping rhythm, emotive operatic vocals, swirling strings, and ghostly backing vocals, it recalls the best uptempo ballads that he recorded during his early-'60s heyday at the Monument label."

Billboard described the album as "pack[ing] powerful emotion."

Cashbox identified the album as one of its "Pop Picks" in a July 1967 review, noting "These tunes, in addition to three other Orbison originals, are included".

In its Album Pick Hits review, Record World notes that Orbison "also wrote all the songs on package [sic], starting with the pretty 'Whirlwind' and romping through other powerful exciters."

Both Record Mirror and AllMusic gave the album a three-star rating. The Encyclopedia of Popular Music gave the album a one-star rating, which meant that the album was classified as "poor".

=== Track listing ===
Side one
No.	Title	Length
1.	"Whirlwind"	2:10
2.	"Medicine Man, Medicine Man"	2:43
3.	"River"	3:02
4.	"The Fastest Guitar Alive"	3:08
5.	"Rollin' On"	2:15

Side two
No.	Title	Length
1.	"Pistolero"	2:58
2.	"Good Time Party"	2:23
3.	"Heading South"	2:45
4.	"Best Friend"	2:38
5.	"There Won't Be Many Coming Home"	2:46

=== Singles ===
Year	Title	UK	AUS
1966	"There Won't Be Many Coming Home"	12	15

== See also ==
- List of American films of 1967
