= Ooby Dooby =

1956 song first recorded by Roy Orbison and the Teen Kings

Single by Roy Orbison and the Teen Kings
- B-side: "Go! Go! Go!"
- Released: 1956
- Recorded: Spring 1956
- Studio: Norman Petty Recording Studios (Clovis)
- Genre: Rock and roll
- Length: 2:12
- Label: Sun
- Songwriters: Wade Moore; Dick Penner
- Producer: Sam Phillips

Roy Orbison and the Teen Kings singles chronology
"Ooby Dooby" and "Go! Go! Go!" (1956)	"You're My Baby" and "Rockhouse" (1956)

"Ooby Dooby" is a song written by Wade Moore and Dick Penner and first recorded by Roy Orbison and the Teen Kings, recorded in Spring 1956, and released that same year.

== Background and composition ==
"Ooby Dooby" was written by Wade Moore and Dick Penner on the rooftop of a Texas University fraternity house and showed it to Roy Orbison who was leading a band named the Teen Kings, and was initially recorded for Je-Wel Records, a record label in Texas. According to Billy Pat Ellis, Roy was there in the frathouse doing a jam session noodling around on his guitar and Moore and Penner first showed it to Orbison, "We liked "Ooby Dooby", we thought it was great.", although Orbison's own account differs from Ellis', Orbison said he first discovered the song at a concert when Moore and Penner played it, "It knocked me flat", "I was astounded because they made more music than the whole orchestra." In "Ooby Dooby", a boy invites a girl join with him to do the Ooby Dooby, a dance that involves the person shaking their hips, and acting like a rattlesnake.

== Recording and production ==
"Ooby Dooby" was recorded at Norman Petty Recording Studios, and was the first time a song was recorded there other than Norman Petty himself, who would use the studio to record with his band the Norman Petty Trio. Orbison himself was broke at that time, so James Morrow, Orbison's mandolin player, was able to obtain enough money to record there. Jeanne Oliver (a singer who sang with the Teen Kings)'s father and a friend of his formed a company together named Je-Wel for the sole purpose of recording "Ooby Dooby". Orbison's account of how the song's recorded originated was different from Ellis', Orbison said that "There were some people in Seminole, Texas who wanted me to make a record for them[, t]hey paid for the time and were going to start a record company". According to Orbison, Petty, his wife and someone else had a truck lower an organ hydraulicly. Sam Phillips produced the track.

== Release and reception ==
"Ooby Dooby" was first issued on Je-Wel Records labeled 101 as a B-side, with the A-side being a cover of the rhythm and blues group the Eagles' "Tryin' to Get to You". The single was later issued on Sun Records later in 1956 backed by "Go! Go! Go!", and the single made national charts. Billboard said of the single: "Oribson's [sic] spectacular, untamed quality spells big action for both sides of this new disking. The top side is already getting healthy initial reaction and regardless of competition, figures to cash in for plenty of loot in the rural sectors. The flip is a wild, swingin' country blues with an impressive primitive flavor." In a review for Cash Box magazine said of the single that Orbison "makes his bid for national recognition with a real inviting vocal performance on a mighty catchy piece of rock and roll material. It’s a tre-mendous jump waxing that could bust wide open."

== Charts ==
Chart (1956)	Peak position
US Billboard The Hot 100	59

== Cover versions ==
=== Creedence Clearwater Revival version ===
"Ooby Dooby"

Song by Creedence Clearwater Revival

from the album Cosmo's Factory
- Released: July 8, 1970
- Studio: Wally Heider (San Francisco)
- Length: 2:05
- Label: Fantasy
- Songwriters: Wade Moore; Dick Penner
- Producer: John Fogerty

In 1970, the American rock band Creedence Clearwater Revival released a cover of "Ooby Dooby" which is faithful to the original close to replicating the original track's guitar solos.

==== Critical reception ====
The Grand Rapids Press said Creedence Clearwater Revival's version is "very strong on guitar picking and drum rolls, with its steady beat interrupted occasionally for some words from Fogerty." Uncut writer Allan Jones called it "affectionate take" on the track.

=== Other versions ===
The first popular cover of "Ooby Dooby" was released in 1956 by Sid King & the Five Strings under the title "Oobie-Doobie" on Columbia Records that reportedly competed with Orbison's original version.

Jerry Lee Lewis recorded a cover for Sun Records that went unreleased until 1974 when it was included on Rockin' and Free, a 1974 release of 22 previously unreleased Jerry Lee Lewis Sun Records recordings.

== Other releases ==
The original recording of "Ooby Dooby" has been included on various Roy Orbison compilations since its release, which include The Essential Roy Orbison (2006).
