= Early Orbison =

Compilation album by Roy Orbison
- Released: September 1964
- Recorded: 1959 – 1961
- Genre: Rock and roll, rockabilly
- Length: 27:23
- Label: Monument
- Producer: Fred Foster

Roy Orbison chronology
More of Roy Orbison's Greatest Hits (1964)	Early Orbison (1964)	There Is Only One Roy Orbison (1965)

Early Orbison is an album recorded by Roy Orbison on the Monument Records label at the RCA Studio B in Nashville, Tennessee, and released in 1964, and was available both in stereo and mono. Essentially a compilation of songs from his first two Monument albums, it is most noteworthy for containing "Pretty One", the "B" side of Orbison's second Monument single, "Uptown". Many Orbison fans believe "Pretty One" would have been his first major hit had it been promoted as an "A" side. The second song of interest on this album is "Come Back to Me My Love" which Fred Foster, owner of Monument Records and producer of all of Orbison's earliest hits, says was the song which inspired production of the hit arrangement that later became "Only the Lonely".

The album debuted on the Billboard Top LPs chart in the issue dated October 17, 1964, and remained on the chart for 11 weeks, peaking at number 101. It reached No. 58 on the Cashbox albums chart in an 11-week run on the chart.

Professional ratings
Review scores
Source	Rating
Allmusic	3/5 stars
The Encyclopedia of Popular Music	2/5 stars
New Record Mirror	3/5 stars

== Track listing ==
Side one
No.	Title	Writer(s)	Length
1.	"The Great Pretender"	Buck Ram	3:00
2.	"Cry"	Churchill Kohlman	2:42
3.	"I Can't Stop Loving You"	Don Gibson	2:41
4.	"I'll Say It's My Fault"	Roy Orbison, Fred Foster	2:23
5.	"She Wears My Ring"	Felice & Boudleaux Bryant	2:28
6.	"Love Hurts"	B. Bryant	2:26

Side two
No.	Title	Writer(s)	Length
1.	"Bye Bye Love"	F. Bryant, B. Bryant	2:12
2.	"Blue Avenue"	Orbison, Joe Melson	1:19
3.	"Raindrops"	Melson	2:05
4.	"Come Back to Me (My Love)"	Orbison, Melson	2:27
5.	"Summer Song"	Orbison, Melson	2:43
6.	"Pretty One"	Orbison	2:17
