= (I'd Be) A Legend in My Time =

Single by Ronnie Milsap

from the album A Legend in My Time
- B-side: "The Biggest Lie"
- Released: November 30, 1974
- Genre: Country
- Length: 2:55
- Label: RCA Victor
- Songwriter: Don Gibson
- Producers: Tom Collins, Jack D. Johnson

Ronnie Milsap singles chronology
"Please Don't Tell Me How the Story Ends" (1974)	"(I'd Be) A Legend in My Time" (1974)	"Too Late to Worry, Too Blue to Cry" (1975)

"(I'd Be) A Legend in My Time" is a song written and recorded by Don Gibson in 1960. It appeared as the B-side of his hit "Far Far Away", from the album Sweet Dreams. Gibson re-recorded the song on the 1972 album Country Green.

== Ronnie Milsap version ==
The song was recorded by Ronnie Milsap and released in November 1974 as the lead single from his album A Legend in My Time. This was Milsap's sixth country hit and his third number one. The single stayed at number one for a single week and spent a total of ten weeks within the top 40. Milsap's recording altered the song from its original 3/4 time signature to a 4/4 time signature.

=== Charts ===
Chart (1974–1975)	Peak position
US Hot Country Songs (Billboard)	1
Canadian RPM Country Tracks	1

== Other cover versions ==
Frequently covered, the song is usually titled without the parenthetical lead. Versions have been recorded by

- Ricky Nelson on his 1963 album titled Rick Nelson Sings For You
- The Everly Brothers on their 1967 album titled The Hit Sound of The Everly Brothers
- The song appeared on the collaboration album Erie Sings & Glen Picks by Tennessee Ernie Ford and Glen Campbell released in 1975
- Connie Francis
- Roy Orbison covered the track for his 1961 album Lonely and Blue, and recorded a second later version which was featured on his 1967 tribute album to Gibson, Roy Orbison Sings Don Gibson.
- Frank Ifield 1963
- Dottie West on her 1967 LP, I'll Help You Forget Her.
- Johnny Cash (on the album American V: A Hundred Highways)
- Waylon Jennings
- B. B. King
- A live version by Tammy Wynette and the Good Guys on Navy Hoedown NH-21, among others.
- A 1973 rendition by Sammy Davis Jr. became an Adult Contemporary chart hit, reaching #33 in Canada and #29 U.S.
