= Roy Orbison at the Rock House =

Studio album by Roy Orbison
- Released: December 1961
- Recorded: 1956–1958
- Studio: Sun Records
- Genre: Rockabilly
- Length: 20:34
- Label: Sun
- Producer: Sam Phillips

Roy Orbison chronology
Lonely and Blue (1961)	Roy Orbison at the Rock House (1961)	Crying (1962)

Roy Orbison at the Rock House is the first album by Roy Orbison on the Sun Records label, released in 1961 in mono after Orbison had already moved to the Monument label. Sun Records owner Sam Phillips had a collection of songs that Orbison had recorded at Sun from 1956 to 1958 and capitalized on the national recognition Orbison achieved at Monument in the form of the three major hit singles in 1960 and 1961 that went to the top of the Billboard charts.

Most of the songs on Roy Orbison at the Rock House were written by Orbison, but the songwriting credits were assigned to Sam Phillips and are in Sun's traditional rockabilly style. "Rock House" is credited to Orbison and Jenkins. For this release, all tracks except "Devil Doll" have been overdubbed with background vocals or additional instruments.

In the UK, this album was released as The Exciting Sounds Of Roy Orbison in 1964 and charted at number 17 for two weeks. In 1969, it was retitled and rereleased in the USA as Roy Orbison - The Original Sound.

In 2001, Bear Family included the album in their 1955-1965 Orbison box set. Avid Rock 'n' Roll labels included it in a box set, 3 Classic Albums Plus, released on February 3, 2017.

== Reception ==
Professional ratings
Review scores
Source	Rating
AllMusic	3.5/5 stars
The Encyclopedia of Popular Music	2/5 stars

Bruce Eder of AllMusic said that the album "is downright bracing and exciting, though it's easy to see why it never succeeded at the time -- numbers like "You're Gonna Cry" and "Problem Child" were a little too intense and ambitious as rock & roll, with too many changes and involved lyrics, to hold that audience en masse."

The 1961 Billboard reviewer said they enjoyed Orbison's "exciting rocking dramatic style."

In its review of the album from October 1964 (as The Exciting Sounds Of Roy Orbison), Cashbox said that the album "contains such hits as 'Rock House' and 'Devil Doll.'"

Record World, reviewing the album as Roy Orbison - The Original Sound, said, "Orbison fans will find this an indispensible [sic] part of their collection."

== Track listing ==
This album was only released under this name in US.

All tracks are written by Roy Orbison, assigned to Sam Phillips, except where indicated.

No.	Title	Writer(s)	Length
1.	"This Kind of Love"		2:09
2.	"Devil Doll"		2:09
3.	"You're My Baby"	Johnny Cash	2:05
4.	"Trying to Get To You"	Rose Marie McCoy, Charles Singleton	2:38
5.	"It's Too Late"	Chuck Willis	1:59
6.	"Rock House"	Sam Phillips, Harold Jenkins	2:02
7.	"You're Gonna Cry"		2:07
8.	"I Never Knew"		2:22
9.	"Sweet and Easy to Love"		2:12
10.	"Mean Little Mama"		1:57
11.	"Ooby Dooby"	Wade Moore, Dick Penner	2:13
12.	"Problem Child"	Roy Orbison	2:10

== Personnel ==
The Teen Kings

- Roy Orbison – lead vocals, lead guitar
- James Morrow – electric mandolin
- Jack Kennelley – double bass
- Johnny Wilson – acoustic guitar
- Billy Pat Ellis – drums

Additional musicians

- The Four Roses – backing vocals
- Uncredited – guitar, bass, piano, drums, overdubbed guitars, bass, piano, drums, backing vocals
