= Hank Williams: The Roy Orbison Way =

Hank Williams the Roy Orbison Way

Studio album by Roy Orbison
- Released: August 1970
- Genre: Country
- Length: 30:22
- Label: MGM
- Producer: Don Gant

Roy Orbison chronology
| The Great Songs of Roy Orbison (1970) | Hank Williams the Roy Orbison Way (1970) | The All-Time Greatest Hits of Roy Orbison (1972) |

Hank Williams: The Roy Orbison Way is the fifteenth album recorded by Roy Orbison, and his eighth with MGM Records, released in August 1970, and was available both in stereo and mono. It is a tribute album to the songs of honky tonk singer Hank Williams, whom Orbison listed among his influences. The album was a critical failure and it sold poorly—Fred Foster said it was "an exercise in futility." The exclusively North America release remained relatively unknown to Orbison fans until it was repackaged on Compact Disc in 2009 along with the popular 1967 Don Gibson tribute album Roy Orbison Sings Don Gibson. The album was also included in the 2015 box set The MGM Years 1965–1973 – Roy Orbison.

== Reception ==
Professional ratings
Review scores
| Source | Rating |
|---|---|
| AllMusic | 2.5/5 stars |
| The Encyclopedia of Popular Music | 2/5 stars |

Critics found fault with arranger Jim Hall putting too much of a pop rock tone on the album, obscuring the country roots of the songs with a string section, rock-style instrumentation, and a choir of backing vocalists. Orbison's familiar "soaring tenor" vocal style also reduced the connection to Hank Williams. Very few listeners were interested in this kind of mixture in 1970. In a retrospective review, singer-songwriter John Kruth wrote that the album's "kitschy aesthetic was decades ahead of its time and would have made a splash in the late '80s with hipsters who revered Les Baxter's exotic soundtracks and Juan Esquivel's retro bachelor pad music."

William Ruhlmann of AllMusic wrote that the production "works best when Orbison is addressing a lesser-known Williams song like '(Last Night) I Heard You Crying in Your Sleep' or 'A Mansion on the Hill', so that the tune seems more his own."

Billboard magazine described the album as "exciting" and noted that Orbison brought "his distinctive vocal style" to bear on the Williams songs.

Cashbox wrote that Orbison "knows just the right amount of pathos to give his voice on such cuts as "(Last Night) I Heard You Crying In Your Sleep".

== Track listing ==
All tracks composed by Hank Williams, except where indicated.

=== Side one ===
1. "Kaw-Liga" (Williams, Fred Rose)
2. "Hey Good Lookin'"
3. "Jambalaya (On the Bayou)"
4. "(Last Night) I Heard You Crying in Your Sleep"
5. "You Win Again"
6. "Your Cheatin' Heart"

=== Side two ===
1. "Cold, Cold Heart"
2. "A Mansion on the Hill" (Williams, Rose)
3. "I Can't Help It (If I'm Still in Love with You)"
4. "There'll Be No Teardrops Tonight"
5. "I'm So Lonesome I Could Cry"

== Production ==
- Produced by Don Gant
- Arranged by Jim Hall
