= Bill McElhiney =

American musical arranger and trumpeter

- McElhiney in 1954

Background information
- Birth name: William Krohmer McElhiney
- Born: May 20, 1915; New Orleans
- Died: February 9, 2002 (aged 86); Diamondhead, Mississippi
- Genres: Country
- Occupation(s): Trumpeter, band-leader, arranger, musical director
- Instrument: Trumpet
- Formerly of: Jim Reeves, Brenda Lee, Patsy Cline, Johnny Cash, Roy Orbison, Danny Davis, Marty Robbins, Dolly Parton

William Krohmer McElhiney (May 20, 1915 – February 9, 2002) was an American musical arranger, trumpeter, band leader, and musical director who was based in Nashville, Tennessee. As a performer, his most notable contribution was the signature trumpet parts on Johnny Cash's "Ring of Fire". He was one of the most prominent musical arrangers in Nashville during the 1960s and 1970s, doing arrangements for Brenda Lee ("I'm Sorry"), Patsy Cline, Roy Orbison, Danny Davis, Marty Robbins, and Dolly Parton. He was honored as Best Arranger of the Year at the 1972 Billboard Country Music Awards. He also served as musical director at Nashville's WSM-AM radio.

== Early years ==
McElhiney was originally from New Orleans. He got his start touring with big-band swing bands in the 1930s. By the mid-1950s, McElhiney had relocated to Nashville where he was a member of WSM's staff orchestra and the leader of an all-star band of modern jazz musicians.

== Trumpeter and band leader ==
He worked Nashville as a trumpeter and band-leader in the 1950s and 1960s.

He was a trumpeter in the orchestra assembled by Owen Bradley to create the Nashville sound on Jim Reeves' recordings. Reeves' biographer noted that, unlike many session musicians, McElhiney and the others could read music and helped contribute to the Reeves' sound: "The sound they achieved was wonderful."

Perhaps the most familiar piece of music McElhiney contributed to was "Ring of Fire" by Johnny Cash. McElhiney teamed with Karl Garvin to provide the signature trumpets so prominent in the recording. Cash was reportedly inspired to add horns to "Ring of Fire" after hearing Bob Moore's 1962 instrumental hit "Mexico" which featured a similar trumpet performance by McElhiney and Garvin.

"Bill McElhiney and his Orchestra" released an album in 1963 (MGM 4135) entitled New Sound in Bluegrass! Bluegrass Banjo with Strings. The Nashville Banner wrote: "The banjo with its backdrop of strings is an innovation in this field of bluegrass, and one that will certainly become as popular as its creator." The album teamed McElhiney with bluegrass banjo artist Bob Johnson. McElhiney and his Orchestra followed up with a second album later in 1963 titled Instrumental Golden Giants.

== Arranger and musical director ==
As McElhiney's reputation grew, he was called on to arrange recordings for many of Nashville's top recording artists and for pop artists visiting Nashville. His works as an arranger include the following:

- McElhiney's early work as an arranger was with Brenda Lee, including the arrangements for her No. 1 hit "I'm Sorry" (1960) and her No. 3 hit "All Alone Am I" (1962). One book asserted that McElhiney's arrangements for Lee "made him rich."
- In 1961, Owen Bradley called on McElhiney to create sophisticated string arrangements for Patsy Cline.
- In 1962, he arranged pop singer Joni James' country music album, Joni James Country Style.
- When pop singer Connie Francis came to Nashville in 1963, McElhiney prepared the arrangements for her recording sessions at the Bradley Studio. He also conducted the orchestra at the Francis sessions.
- He arranged Johnny Tillotson's cover of "Talk Back Trembling Lips" (1963), a recording that became a No. 7 Billboard hit.
- In 1963, 1964, and 1966, he did the arrangements for Hank Williams Jr.'s early recordings. He also did arrangements for Williams' 1969 recordings under the name Luke the Drifter Jr.
- He worked extensively with Roy Orbison whose arrangements were described by Orbison's biographer as "sometimes groovy, sometimes gooey." His credited work with Orbison includes the albums The Orbison Way (1966), Roy Orbison Sings Don Gibson (1967), and Cry Softly Lonely One (1967).
- He arranged Sandy Posey's Nashville sessions that included the No. 12 pop hit, "I Take It Back" (1967).
- He was also the arranger for Danny Davis and his "Nashville Brass". The Nashville Brass won the "instrumental group of the year" award from the Country Music Association for three consecutive years from 1970 to 1972. McElhiney was given the honor of accepting the award on the group's behalf in 1970 and 1971, and Davis brought him on stage again in 1972 to share in the honor.
- He arranged the strings on Tanya Tucker's albums What's Your Mama's Name (1973) and Would You Lay with Me (In a Field of Stone) (1974).
- In 1975, McElhiney was responsible for the orchestration on Dolly Parton's album, Dolly that included the No. 1 hit "The Seeker".

In the late 1960s, he assumed a position previously held by Owen Bradley, the prominent role as the musical director for Nashville's legendary WSM-AM radio, home of The Grand Ole Opry.

At the 1972 Billboard Country Music Awards, he was honored as the Best Arranger of the Year.

In 1988, he was credited with arrangements on k.d. lang's album Shadowland.

He worked with other major talents, including Ray Charles, Floyd Cramer, Marty Robbins, and Perry Como.

== Later years ==
McElhiney suffered from Alzheimer's disease in his later years. He died in 2002 at age 86 in Diamondhead, Mississippi.
