= Orbisongs =

Compilation album by Roy Orbison
- Released: November 1965
- Recorded: 1960 – 1965
- Genre: Rockabilly
- Length: 30:34
- Label: Monument
- Producer: Fred Foster

Roy Orbison chronology
There Is Only One Roy Orbison (1965)	Orbisongs (1965)	The Orbison Way (1966)

Singles from Orbisongs
- 1. "Oh, Pretty Woman" Released: August 29, 1964; 2. "Goodnight" Released: January 25, 1965; 3. "(Say) You're My Girl" Released: June 1965; 4. "Let the Good Times Roll" Released: November 1965

Orbisongs is a compilation LP released by Monument Records in 1965 after Roy Orbison had left the label and joined MGM, and was available both in stereo and mono. It features tracks such as the stereo version of "Oh, Pretty Woman", a different version of "Dance", and the unreleased "I Get So Sentimental."

Cash Box described the single "(Say) You're My Girl" as an "easy-going, pledge of romantic devotion with an infectious repeating rhythmic riff."

The album debuted on the Billboard Top LPs chart in the issue dated November 6, 1965, and remained on the chart for 11 weeks, peaking at number 136. It entered the UK album chart two years later on July 22, 1967, and spent its only week on the album chart there at number 40." It reached No. 74 on the Cashbox albums chart where it spent for 6 weeks.

The album was released on compact disc by Monument Records in 1993 as tracks 13 through 24 on a pairing of two albums on one CD with tracks 1 through 12 consisting of Orbison third studio album from June 1963, In Dreams. Bear Family included also the album in the 2001 Orbison 1955-1965 box set.

== Background ==
In 1965, Roy Orbison left Monument Records and signed a contract with MGM Records. This followed the international success of his 1964 single "Oh, Pretty Woman", which reached number one in the United States, the United Kingdom, Canada, and Australia. MGM offered him opportunities to appear in films, which were difficult to obtain through Monument Records producer Fred Foster. Orbison chose these opportunities as a major reason for his move to MGM.

Following Orbison's move to MGM, Monument Records retained the rights to previously recorded material. Consequently, in 1965, the label released the compilation album Orbisongs, bringing together previously issued recordings. The album was released in both mono and stereo formats and included a stereo version of "Oh, Pretty Woman" as well as "(I Get So) Sentimental".

In addition to previously released material, the album featured an alternate recording of "Dance". "(I Get So) Sentimental" had been recorded in 1962 and was subsequently made available through the album.

Orbisongs was produced by Fred Foster and served as a collection of Orbison's recordings from his time with Monument Records.

== Singles ==
"Oh, Pretty Woman" made its debut on the Billboard Hot 100 chart on August 29, 1964, eventually spending three weeks at number one during its 15-week stay, number one on the Cash Box singles chart, and number 1 in the UK Singles. "Goodnight" made its debut on the Billboard Hot 100 chart on February 13, 1965, eventually spending one week at number 21 during its seven-week stay, number 20 on the Cash Box singles chart, and number 14 in the UK Singles. "(Say) You're My Girl" made its debut on the Billboard Hot 100 chart on July 10, 1965, eventually spending one week at number 39 during its seven-week stay, number 49 on the Cash Box singles chart, and number 23 in the UK Singles. "Let the Good Times Roll" made its debut on the Billboard Hot 100 chart on November 23, 1965, eventually spending one week at number 81 during its three-week stay, and number 96 on the Cash Box singles chart.

== Reception ==
Professional ratings
Review scores
Source	Rating
AllMusic	3/5 stars
The Encyclopedia of Popular Music	2/5 stars
Record Mirror	3/5 stars

Billboard gave the album a positive review, saying "his rendition of 'Let the Good Times Roll' is exceptional"

Cashbox praised Orbison for "Bridging the gap from the big rock sound to the ballad"

Record Mirror said the album features "a somewhat motley selection", giving it three-star rating. It received the same rating from AllMusic, while getting a lower two-star rating from The Encyclopedia of Popular Music, meaning that they believed that album was "flawed or lacking in some way."

== Track listing ==
Side one
No.	Title	Writer(s)	Length
1.	"Oh, Pretty Woman"	Roy Orbison, Bill Dees	2:55
2.	"Dance"	Orbison, Joe Melson	2:25
3.	"(Say) You're My Girl"	Orbison, Dees	2:44
4.	"Goodnight"	Orbison, Dees	2:27
5.	"Nitelife"	Orbison, Melson	2:10
6.	"Let the Good Times Roll"	Leonard Lee	2:30

Side two
No.	Title	Writer(s)	Length
1.	"(I Get So) Sentimental"	Orbison, Melson	2:40
2.	"Yo Te Amo Maria"	Orbison, Dees	3:15
3.	"Wedding Day"	Orbison, Melson	2:06
4.	"Sleepy Hollow"	Dees	3:04
5.	"22 Days"	Gene Pitney	3:04
6.	"(I'd Be) A Legend in My Time"	Don Gibson	3:03

== Charts ==
=== Album ===
Chart (1965)	Peak position
US Top LPs (Billboard)	136
US Cashbox	74
UK Albums Chart	40

=== Singles ===
Year	Title	U.S. Hot 100	U.S. Cashbox	CAN	UK singles chart
1964	"Oh, Pretty Woman"	1	1	1	1
1965	"Goodnight"	21	20	5	14
1965	"(Say) You're My Girl"	39	49	17	23
1965	"Let the Good Times Roll"	81	96	—	—
