= More of Roy Orbison's Greatest Hits =

Greatest hits album by Roy Orbison
- Released: July 1, 1964
- Recorded: 1961 – 1964
- Genre: Rock and roll, pop, rockabilly
- Length: 29:15
- Label: Monument
- Producer: Fred Foster

Roy Orbison chronology
In Dreams (1963)	More of Roy Orbison's Greatest Hits (1964)	Early Orbison (1964)

More of Roy Orbison's Greatest Hits is a Roy Orbison album from Monument Records recorded at the RCA Studio B in Nashville, Tennessee and released in 1964, and was available both in stereo and mono. The songs "It's Over" and "Indian Wedding" were recorded at the Fred Foster Studios also in Nashville.

In the US, the single released from the album, "It's Over", debuted on the Billboard Hot 100 in the issue dated April 11, 1964, peaking at number nine during its 11-week stay. on the Cashbox singles, it reached number ten during its 12-week stay. it spent two weeks at number one in The U.K during its 18-week stay. In the UK the song chosen as the single for release was "Borne on The Wind", and it entered the singles chart there for the week of February 26, 1964, stayed around for ten weeks, peaking at number 15.

The album debuted on the Billboard Top LPs chart in the issue dated August 22, 1964, and remained on the chart for 30 weeks, peaking at number 19. It reached number nine on the Cashbox albums chart where it spent there for 22 weeks. Bear Family included also the album in the 2001 Orbison 1955-1965 box set.

== Reception ==
Professional ratings
Review scores
Source	Rating
AllMusic	3/5 stars
The Encyclopedia of Popular Music	3/5 stars
Record Mirror	4/5 stars

Billboard commended the album, writing that "the selections speak for themselves and the commercial appeal of Roy Orbison."

Cashbox praised Orbison for "his feelingful readings" of the material.

Record Mirror thought the compilation was "a striking set of reminiscent recollections."

== Track listing ==
Side one
No.	Title	Writer(s)	Length
1.	"It's Over"	Roy Orbison, Bill Dees	2:47
2.	"Blue Bayou"	Roy Orbison, Joe Melson	2:29
3.	"Indian Wedding"	Roy Orbison	2:59
4.	"Falling"	Roy Orbison	2:22
5.	"Working for the Man"	Orbison	2:25
6.	"Pretty Paper"	Willie Nelson	2:41

Side two
No.	Title	Writer(s)	Length
1.	"Mean Woman Blues"	Claude Demetrius	2:23
2.	"Lana"	Roy Orbison, Joe Melson	2:46
3.	"In Dreams"	Roy Orbison	2:46
4.	"Leah"	Roy Orbison	2:37
5.	"Borne on the Wind"	Roy Orbison, Bill Dees	2:50
6.	"What'd I Say"	Ray Charles	2:50

== Charts ==
Chart (1964)	Peak position
U.S. Top LPs (Billboard)	19
U.S. Cashbox	9
