= Go Go Go (Roy Orbison song) =

"Go Go Go (Down the Line)"

Single by Roy Orbison and the Teen Kings

from the album She Cried
- A-side: "Ooby Dooby"
- Released: May 1956
- Recorded: March 27, 1956, Memphis, TN
- Genre: Rock and roll, rockabilly
- Length: 2:11
- Label: Sun
- Songwriter: Roy Orbison
- Producer: Sam Phillips

Roy Orbison and the Teen Kings singles chronology
"Tryin' to Get to You" (1956)	"Go Go Go (Down the Line)" (1956)	"Rock House" (1956)

"Go Go Go (Down the Line)" (often credited as "Down the Line") is a song by Roy Orbison, released in 1956. According to the authorised biography of Roy Orbison, this was the B-side to Orbison's first Sun Records release "Ooby Dooby". This was the first song written by Orbison.

Jerry Lee Lewis released a recording of the song on Sun Records in 1958 under the title "Down the Line".

== Background ==
The song was released as a Sun Records single in May, 1956, Sun 242, Matrix # U-193, as the B side to "Ooby Dooby" with the backup group The Teen Kings.

The song was later released under the title "Down the Line" by Jerry Lee Lewis and Ricky Nelson. Sam Phillips, the owner and founder of Sun Records, bought out Orbison's songs on Sun Records and placed his name on the songwriting credits although Orbison was the actual songwriter.

The song was re-recorded by Orbison with the Art Movement in 1969, for the album The Big O released in 1970, and was called "Down the Line".

Orbison performed the song on his Cinemax cable concert special Roy Orbison and Friends, A Black and White Night in 1988 featuring an all-star cast of guest musicians, including Bruce Springsteen, Elvis Costello, James Burton, and T Bone Burnett. The song also appeared on the album from the special A Black & White Night Live released in 1989.

== Covers ==
Jerry Lee Lewis released the song as a Sun single (Sun 288) in February, 1958 backed with "Breathless." "Down the Line" reached no. 51 on the Billboard pop singles chart.

Jerry Lee Lewis also released a version on the 1973 Mercury Records album The Session.

It has been covered by The Del-Tinos in 1963, Mickey Gilley in 1964, The Hollies in 1965, Cliff Richard and the Drifters in 1959, Billy Fury and Peter Case in 1993. Ricky Nelson recorded a version of the song for his 1958 album, Ricky Nelson. A version by Johnny Cash appears on Unearthed.
