= Lonely and Blue =

Studio album by Roy Orbison
- Released: January 1961
- Recorded: 1959–1960
- Studios: RCA Studio B, Nashville, Tennessee
- Genre: Rock and roll
- Length: 28:33
- Label: Monument
- Producer: Fred Foster

Roy Orbison chronology
Lonely and Blue (1961)	Roy Orbison at the Rock House (1961)

Singles from Lonely and Blue
- 1. "Only the Lonely" Released: May 9, 1960; 2. "Blue Angel" Released: August 29, 1960; 3. "I'm Hurtin'" Released: November 1960

Lonely and Blue is the debut studio album by Roy Orbison, released on Monument Records in January 1961, and was available both in stereo and mono. It entered the UK albums chart two years later, on June 30, 1963 and reached number 14 over the course of eight weeks.

The track, "Come Back to Me (My Love)", features an almost identical intro to "Only the Lonely" because this is where the vocal figure of "Only the Lonely" came from. The album also features multiple covers of songs from Don Gibson, The Everly Brothers, Gene Pitney, and Johnnie Ray"

The album was released on compact disc by Monument Records in 1993 as tracks 1 through 12 on a pairing of two albums on one CD with tracks 13 through 24 consisting of Orbison's 1962 album, Crying. Bear Family included also the album in the 2001 Orbison 1955-1965 box set. Sony Music label included this CD in the 2013 Roy Orbison The Monument Box Set. Avid Rock 'n' Roll labels included this CD in the 2017 3 Classic Albums Plus Box Set.

== History ==
After a two-year stint at Sun Records, Roy Orbison signed up with RCA Records in 1958, but left after two singles. In early 1959 Orbison's manager Wesley Rose asked producer and owner Fred Foster if he was interested in signing him for Monument Records. Foster said yes. The album was recorded at RCA Studio B using two- and three-track tape machines.

== Reception ==
Professional ratings
Review scores
Source	Rating
AllMusic	3.5/5 stars
The Encyclopedia of Popular Music	2/5 stars

Bruce Eder of AllMusic said that the album "packed with great moments and different permutations of that sound: the powerful lead vocal and the Boots Randolph sax break on "I'll Say It's My Fault"; the haunting Orbison-Melson "Come Back to Me (My Love)," a vest-pocket romantic melodrama sung with operatic depth and played to a light rock & roll beat; Don Gibson's "I'd Be a Legend in My Time", and "I Can't Stop Loving You".

Billboard magazine identified the album as a "Spotlight Winner of the Week" in its review from January 1961, described the album as "a Spinnable Album".

Cashbox appreciated the effort. "Good material and a striking delivery add up to strong merchandise."

Variety wrote that "his previous single chicks, Only The Lonely', 'Blue Angel', and 'I'm Hurtin' are included here as well as some other Nashville originated songs that take popsterws will find easy to take.".

== Track listing ==
All tracks recorded 15–17 September 1960, except where indicated.

Side one
No.	Title	Writer(s)	Length
1.	"Only the Lonely" (March 25, 1960)	Roy Orbison, Joe Melson	2:26
2.	"Bye Bye Love"	Felice & Boudleaux Bryant	2:14
3.	"Cry"	Churchill Kohlman	2:41
4.	"Blue Avenue" (March 25, 1960)	Roy Orbison, Joe Melson	2:20
5.	"I Can't Stop Loving You"	Don Gibson	2:43
6.	"Come Back to Me (My Love)"	Roy Orbison, Joe Melson	2:27

Side two
No.	Title	Writer(s)	Length
1.	"Blue Angel" (August 8, 1960)	Roy Orbison, Joe Melson	2:51
2.	"Raindrops" (September 18, 1959)	Joe Melson	1:53
3.	"(I'd Be) A Legend in My Time"	Don Gibson	3:08
4.	"I'm Hurtin'"	Roy Orbison, Joe Melson	2:43
5.	"Twenty-Two Days"	Gene Pitney	3:07
6.	"I'll Say It's My Fault"	Roy Orbison, Fred Foster	2:21

== Charts ==
=== Album ===
Chart (1963)	Peak position
UK Albums Chart	14

=== Singles ===
Year	Title	US Hot 100	US Cashbox	CAN	UK singles chart
1960	"Only the Lonely"	2	2	2	1
1960	"Blue Angel"	9	13	14	11
1960	"I'm Hurtin'"	27	28	27	—
