= In Dreams (Roy Orbison album) =

Studio album by Roy Orbison
- Released: July 1963
- Studios: RCA Victor Studio B, Nashville
- Genre: Rock and roll
- Length: 28:12
- Label: Monument (MLP 8003)
- Producer: Fred Foster

Roy Orbison chronology
| Roy Orbison's Greatest Hits (1962) | In Dreams (1963) | More of Roy Orbison's Greatest Hits (1964) |

Singles from In Dreams
- 1. "In Dreams" Released: February 1963; 2. "Blue Bayou" Released: August 1, 1963

In Dreams is the fourth studio album by American singer Roy Orbison, released in July 1963 by Monument Records. and was available both in stereo and mono. it was recorded at the RCA Studio B in Nashville, Tennessee. It is named after the hit 45rpm single "In Dreams".

In Dreams Also included multiple cover songs, including "All I Have to Do Is Dream", "Dream", and "My Prayer", In 2004 Rolling Stone named the title song number 319 on their 500 Greatest Songs of All Time.

The album debuted on the Billboard Top LP's chart in the issue dated August 17, 1963, and remained on the chart for 23 weeks, peaking at number 35. It reached No. 39 on the Cashbox albums chart where it spent there for 25 weeks, when it debuted in the issue dated August 3, 1963. In the UK, it spent 58 weeks on the albums chart, peaking at number six. The "Title Song" debuted on the Billboard Hot 100 chart on February 9, 1963, eventually spending one week at number seven during its 13-week stay. number six in The U.K during its 23-weeks stay. on the Cashbox singles weeks it spent one week at number ten during its 14-week stay. Another single, "Blue Bayou" debuted on the Billboard Hot 100 chart on September 14, 1963, eventually spending one week at number 29 during its ten-week stay. number three in The U.K during its 19-weeks stay. on the Cashbox singles weeks it spent one week at number 21 during its 12-week stay.

The album was released on compact disc by Monument Records in 1993 as tracks 1 through 12 on a pairing of two albums on one CD with tracks 13 through 24 consisting of Orbison's 1965 compilation, Orbisongs. It was released as one of two albums on one CD by Legacy Recordngs on February 26, 2008, along with Orbison's 1962 album, Crying. Bear Family included this CD in the 2001 Orbison 1955-1965 box set. Sony Music label included this CD in the 2013 Roy Orbison The Monument Box Set.

== Reception ==
Professional ratings
Review scores
| Source | Rating |
|---|---|
| AllMusic | 4.5/5 stars |
| The Encyclopedia of Popular Music | 3/5 stars |
| Disc | 4/5 stars |
| Record Mirror | 4/5 stars |

Thom Jurek of AllMusic said that the album showed "The emotion and deep atmospherics of the tunes here reflect Foster's sophistication, but also Orbison's willingness to develop himself as a singer and as a persona. Orbison wrote or co-wrote four tracks this time out, but the song choices are impeccable."

Billboard in its Spotlight of the Week album reviews stated that the album "features another standout group of tracks."

Cashbox believed Orbison "has a huge following and this new effort is sure to bring the fans out in droves."

Variety said that "Orbison swings out nicely on the pop tunes presented, some of which are from the recent disclick songalog."

Record Mirror mentions that the album "features a Consistent chart success with ballads, [and] even during the current beat craze."

Hunter Nigel of Disc enjoyed the album "soft symptomatic treatment of "My Prayer"

== Track listing ==
Side one
| No. | Title | Writer(s) | Length |
|---|---|---|---|
| 1. | "In Dreams" | Roy Orbison | 2:51 |
| 2. | "Lonely Wine" | Roy Wells | 2:57 |
| 3. | "Shahdaroba" | Cindy Walker | 2:41 |
| 4. | "No One Will Ever Know" | Mel Foree, Fred Rose | 2:31 |
| 5. | "Sunset" | Roy Orbison, Joe Melson | 2:23 |
| 6. | "House Without Windows" | Fred Tobias, Lee Pockriss | 2:15 |

Side two
| No. | Title | Writer(s) | Length |
|---|---|---|---|
| 1. | "Dream" | Johnny Mercer | 2:32 |
| 2. | "Blue Bayou" | Roy Orbison, Joe Melson | 2:38 |
| 3. | "(They Call You) Gigolette" | Roy Orbison, Joe Melson | 2:27 |
| 4. | "All I Have to Do Is Dream" | Boudleaux Bryant | 2:22 |
| 5. | "Beautiful Dreamer" | Stephen Foster; arranged by Franz Conde | 2:21 |
| 6. | "My Prayer" | Georges Boulanger, Jimmy Kennedy | 2:47 |

== Charts ==
=== Album ===
| Chart (1963) | Peak position |
|---|---|
| UK Albums Chart | 6 |
| US Top LPs (Billboard) | 35 |
| US Cashbox | 39 |

=== Singles ===
| Year | Title | US Hot 100 | US Cashbox | CAN | UK |
|---|---|---|---|---|---|
| 1963 | "In Dreams" | 7 | 10 | 7 | 6 |
| 1963 | "Blue Bayou" | 29 | 21 | 14 | 3 |
