= Crying (album) =

Studio album by Roy Orbison
- Released: January 1962
- Studios: RCA Victor Studio B, Nashville, Tennessee
- Genres: Rock and roll; pop
- Length: 29:23
- Label: Monument (M 4007)
- Producer: Fred Foster

Roy Orbison chronology
Roy Orbison at the Rock House (1961)	Crying (1962)	Roy Orbison's Greatest Hits (1962)

Singles from Crying
- 1. "Running Scared" Released: March 27, 1961; 2. "Crying" Released: July 31, 1961

Crying is the third album by Roy Orbison, released in January 1962, and was available both in stereo and mono. It was his second album on the Monument Record label. The album name comes from the 1961 hit song of the same name. In 2002 the song was honored with a Grammy Hall of Fame Award, and In 2004, it ranked #69 on Rolling Stone Magazine's "500 Greatest Songs of All Time". The album was ranked No. 136 on Pitchfork's 200 Best Albums of the 1960s. Crying also features Multiple covers songs including "The Great Pretender", "Love Hurts", and the early recordings of "She Wears My Ring" (which would become a huge hit for Country Singer Ray Price in 1968).

The album debuted on the Billboard Top LPs chart in the issue dated April 7, 1962, remaining on the chart for 31 weeks and peaking at number 21. It entered the UK albums chart on June 30, 1963, reaching number 17 over the course of three weeks. it also debuted on the Cashbox albums chart in the issue dated April 7, 1962. and remained on the chart for 10 weeks, peaking at No. 35. The single, "Running Scared" made its debut on the Billboard Hot 100 chart on April 10, 1961, eventually spending one week at number one during its 17-week stay. on the Cashbox singles it spent two weeks at number one during its 15-week stay. and number nine in The U.K during its 15-weeks stay. Another single, "Crying", debuted on the Billboard Hot 100 chart on August 14, 1961, eventually spending one week at number two during its 16-week stay. number 25 in The U.K during its nine-weeks stay. on the Cashbox singles weeks it spent one week at number one during its 16-week stay.

The album was released on compact disc by Monument Records in 1993 as tracks 13 through 24 on a pairing of two albums on one CD, with tracks 1 through 12 consisting of Orbison's debut album, Lonely and Blue. It was released as one of two albums on one CD by Legacy Recordngs on February 26, 2008, along with Orbison's 1963 album, In Dreams. It was also released as one of two albums on one CD by Sony BMG on September 17, 2007, along with Orbison's 1989 Live album, A Black & White Night Live. Bear Family included also the album in the 2001 Orbison 1955-1965 box set. Sony Music label included this CD in the 2013 Roy Orbison The Monument Box Set. Avid Rock 'n' Roll labels included this CD in the 2017 3 Classic Albums Plus Box Set.

== Reception ==
Professional ratings
Review scores
Source	Rating
AllMusic	3/5 stars
The Encyclopedia of Popular Music	3/5 stars
Disc	3/5 stars

Billboard in its Spotlight of the Week album reviews stated that the album "features a fine collection of tunes."

Cashbox described the album as a "top-notch listening pleasure album."

Richie Unterberger of AllMusic said that the album "was above-average considering the slight standards of the time, but was a fairly slight effort nonetheless. In its favor, the album features nearly all original material by Orbison and some of the writers who frequently tailored songs for him, such as Boudleaux and Felice Bryant and Joe Melson.

== Track listing ==
All tracks are written by Roy Orbison and Joe Melson, except where indicated.

Side one
No.	Title	Writer(s)	Length
1.	"Crying"		2:45
2.	"The Great Pretender"	Buck Ram	3:02
3.	"Love Hurts"	Boudleaux Bryant	2:28
4.	"She Wears My Ring"	Felice & Boudleaux Bryant	2:30
5.	"Wedding Day"		2:06
6.	"Summersong"		2:45

Side two
No.	Title	Length
1.	"Dance"	2:52
2.	"Lana"	2:17
3.	"Loneliness"	2:27
4.	"Let's Make a Memory"	2:18
5.	"Nite Life"	2:32
6.	"Running Scared"	2:14

== Charts ==
Chart (1962)	Peak position
US Top LPs (Billboard)	21
US Cashbox	35
UK Albums Chart	17

=== Singles ===
Year	Title	US Hot 100	US Cashbox	CAN	UK Singles Chart
1961	"Running Scared"	1	1	3	9
1961	"Crying"	2	1	3	25

== Personnel ==
- Roy Orbison - vocals, guitar
- Boudleaux Bryant, Fred Carter Jr., Grady Martin, Hank Garland, Harold Bradley, Joe Tanner, Ray Edenton, Scotty Moore - guitar
- Bob Moore - bass
- Bill Pursell, Floyd Cramer - piano
- Buddy Harman, John Greubel - drums
- Charlie McCoy - harmonica
- Boots Randolph, Harry Johnson - saxophone
- Cam Mullins, Karl Garvin - trumpet
- Byron Bach - cello
- Brenton Banks, Cecil Brower, Dorothy Walker, George Binkley, Lillian Hunt, Solie Fott, Suzanne Parker, Vernal Richardson, Wilda Tinsley - violin
- Howard Carpenter - viola

Technical

- Bill Porter - recording engineer
