= It's Over (Roy Orbison song) =

1964 song by Roy Orbison and Bill Dees

- UK 7" vinyl single cover

Single by Roy Orbison
- B-side: "Indian Wedding"
- Published: April 7, 1964 Acuff-Rose Publications, Inc.
- Released: April 1964
- Recorded: March 10, 1964
- Studio: Fred Foster Sound Studio, Nashville, Tennessee
- Genre: Rock; bolero
- Length: 2:47
- Label: Monument 837
- Songwriters: Roy Orbison, Bill Dees
- Producer: Wesley Rose

Roy Orbison singles chronology
"Pretty Paper" (1963)	"It's Over" (1964)	"Oh, Pretty Woman" (1964)

"It's Over" is an American song composed by Roy Orbison and Bill Dees and sung by Orbison. The single was produced by Fred Foster and engineered by Bill Porter.

"It's Over" typifies the operatic rock ballad. The song also appears on Orbison's 1964 album More of Roy Orbison's Greatest Hits and his 1989 posthumous album A Black & White Night Live from the 1988 HBO television special.

Billboard said of the song that "the drama-ballad king scores again with pathos and chorus and strings that build, build, build." Cash Box described it as "a throbbing, martial beat-like lover's lament that once again builds to a big finish" and praised the instrumental arrangement by Bill Justis.

== Chart performance ==
The song was released as a 45rpm single by Monument Records in 1964, The single entered the United States Cashbox chart on April 11, 1964, peaking at No.10 (on May 23, 1964), and reached No. 9 on the Billboard pop music chart.

Meanwhile, after entering the United Kingdom singles chart on April 30, 1964, "It's Over" reached No. 1 on June 25, 1964 (making it Orbison's second UK No.1 single [the first was "Only the Lonely" in 1960]). "It's Over" spent 2 weeks at No.1 on the UK singles chart, out of a total of 18 weeks on that chart. "It's Over" and the Supremes' "Baby Love" are the only American singles that topped the UK chart between 1963 and 1965.

In Australia, the song peaked at #9, spending 16 weeks in the KMR Charts. It entered the chart on the 2nd May 1964.

It reached #1 on the New Zealand lever hit parade.

The song also spent ten weeks in the Irish Singles Chart, three of which were at No.1. It was one of six chart-toppers for Orbison in Ireland.

== Morrissey version ==
In 2019, English singer Morrissey released a cover version of the song as the first single from his album California Son, featuring guest vocals from LP. The single reached Number 1 on the UK's Official Physical Singles Chart.
