= Oh, Pretty Woman =

1964 single by Roy Orbison and the Candy Men

Single by Roy Orbison and the Candy Men

from the album Oh, Pretty Woman (non-US)
- B-side: "Yo te Amo María"
- Published: August 26, 1964 Acuff-Rose Publications, Inc.
- Released: August 1964
- Recorded: August 1, 1964
- Studio: Fred Foster Sound Studio, Nashville, Tennessee
- Genre: Rock and roll, rockabilly
- Length: 2:58
- Label: Monument
- Songwriters: Roy Orbison; Bill Dees
- Producer: Fred Foster

Roy Orbison and the Candy Men singles chronology
"It's Over" (1964)	"Oh, Pretty Woman" (1964)	"Goodnight" (1965)

Audio sample
- file; help

"Oh, Pretty Woman" (or simply "Pretty Woman") is a song recorded by Roy Orbison and written by Orbison and Bill Dees. It was released as a single in August 1964 on Monument Records and spent three weeks at number one on the Billboard Hot 100 from September 26, 1964, making it the second and final single by Orbison (after "Running Scared") to reach number one in the United States. It was also Orbison's third single to top the UK Singles Chart, where it spent three weeks at number one.

The single version (in mono) and the LP version (in stereo on the Orbisongs LP) have slightly differing lyrics. The LP version with the intended lyric: "come with me baby" was changed for the single to "come to me baby" as the former was considered too risque. The record ultimately sold seven million copies and marked the high point in Orbison's career. In October 1964, the single was certified gold by the RIAA. At the year's end, Billboard ranked it the number four song of 1964.

"Oh, Pretty Woman" was later used for the title of the 1990 film Pretty Woman and its 2018 Broadway musical adaptation. Acuff-Rose Music's lawsuit over a parody of "Oh, Pretty Woman" by 2 Live Crew led to a U.S. Supreme Court ruling (Campbell v. Acuff-Rose Music, Inc.) establishing that parody was a valid form of fair use.

== Overview ==
The title was inspired by Orbison's wife, Claudette, interrupting a conversation to announce that she was going out. When Orbison asked if she had enough cash, his co-writer Bill Dees interjected, "A pretty woman never needs any money."

Orbison's recording of the song was produced by Fred Foster and engineered by Bill Porter on August 1, 1964. There were four guitar players at the session: Orbison, Billy Sanford, Jerry Kennedy, and Wayne Moss. Sanford, who later played on sessions for Elvis Presley, Don Williams, and many others, played the song's introductory guitar riff. Other musicians on the recording included Floyd Cramer on piano, Henry Strzelecki on bass, Boots Randolph and Charlie McCoy on saxophones, Buddy Harman on drums, and Paul Garrison on percussion. Dees sang harmony vocals, as he did on many Orbison songs. Billboard described the song as having a "great dance beat coupled with fine arrangement." Cash Box described it as "a catchy, quick-beat salute with a number of ear-catching rockin' ingredients."

Orbison posthumously won the 1991 Grammy Award for Best Male Pop Vocal Performance for the recording of "Oh, Pretty Woman" from his 1988 HBO television special Roy Orbison and Friends: A Black and White Night. In 1999, the song was inducted into the Grammy Hall of Fame and was named one of the Rock and Roll Hall of Fame's 500 Songs that Shaped Rock and Roll. In 2004, Rolling Stone magazine ranked the song at number 224 on their "500 Greatest Songs of All Time" list. On May 14, 2008, the Library of Congress selected the song for preservation in the National Recording Registry.

== Promotional video ==
A promotional video for the song directed by Stanley Dorfman was filmed on October 19, 1964, in the rooftop garden of the Derry and Toms department store in Kensington, London. The clip was filmed to air on Top of the Pops on October 22, as Orbison was unable to attend the show's live taping. It subsequently aired on October 29, November 12, and November 19.

== Copyright issue ==
In 1989, Miami bass group 2 Live Crew recorded "Pretty Woman", a parody of "Oh, Pretty Woman", for their album As Clean as They Wanna Be. The group sampled the distinctive bassline from Orbison's recording, but wrote new lyrics about a hairy woman, her bald-headed friend, and their appeal to the singer, as well as denunciation of a "two-timing woman".

Orbison's music publisher, Acuff-Rose Music, sued 2 Live Crew on the basis that fair use did not permit reuse of their copyrighted material for profit. The United States Supreme Court unanimously ruled in 2 Live Crew's favor in 1994, greatly expanding the doctrine of fair use and extending its protections to parodies created for profit.

== Charts ==
Weekly charts

Chart (1964–1965)	Peak position
Argentina (CAPIF)	2
Australia (Kent Music Report)	1
Austria (Ö3 Austria Top 40)	5
Belgium (Ultratop 50 Flanders)	1
Belgium (Ultratop 40 Wallonia)	5
Canada Top Singles (RPM)	1
Denmark (IFPI)	3
Finland (Suomen virallinen lista)	9
France (IFOP)	8
Hong Kong	1
Ireland (IRMA)	1
Malaysia	4
Netherlands (Dutch Top 40)	3
Netherlands (Single Top 100)	1
New Zealand (Lever Hit Parade)	1
Norway (VG-lista)	1
Singapore	1
Switzerland (Schweizer Hitparade)	1
UK Singles (Official Charts)	1
US Billboard Hot 100	1
West Germany (GfK)	1

=== Year-end charts ===
Chart (1964)	Rank
South Africa (Springbok Radio)	15
UK Singles (OCC)	7
US Billboard Hot 100	4

== Certifications ==
Region	Certification	Certified units/sales
Canada	—	180,000
Denmark (IFPI Danmark)	Gold	45,000^{‡}
Germany	—	350,000
Italy (FIMI)	Gold	50,000^{‡}
New Zealand (RMNZ)	2× Platinum	60,000^{‡}
Spain (Promusicae)	Platinum	60,000^{‡}
United Kingdom (BPI)	Platinum	680,000
United States (RIAA)	Gold	1,000,000^{^}
^{^} Shipments figures based on certification alone.^{‡} Sales+streaming figures based on certification alone.

== Van Halen version ==
"(Oh) Pretty Woman"

Single by Van Halen

from the album Diver Down
- B-side: "Happy Trails"
- Released: January 18, 1982
- Studio: Sunset Sound Recorders, Hollywood
- Genre: Hard rock
- Length: 2:55 (single version); 4:34 (with "Intruder")
- Label: Warner Bros.
- Songwriters: Roy Orbison; Bill Dees
- Producer: Ted Templeman

Van Halen singles chronology
"Unchained" (1981)	"(Oh) Pretty Woman" (1982)	"Dancing in the Street" (1982)

Music videos
- "(Oh) Pretty Woman" on YouTube

Van Halen recorded a cover of "Oh, Pretty Woman" to be released as a non-album single in January 1982 before a planned hiatus. However, the single's sudden success brought pressure from Warner Bros. Records to produce an entire LP; the resulting album, Diver Down, was released that April.

On Diver Down and in the song's music video, "(Oh) Pretty Woman" is preceded by the instrumental "Intruder", which features frontman David Lee Roth playing an Electro-Harmonix synthesizer. Roth had written "Intruder" because the video the band had filmed for "(Oh) Pretty Woman" was longer than the song's running time.

=== Music video ===
In the music video, filmed at Indian Dunes near Valencia, California, the band members appear dressed as a samurai (bassist Michael Anthony), Tarzan (drummer Alex Van Halen), a cowboy (guitarist Eddie Van Halen), and Napoleon (Roth). Per a hunch-backed onlooker's request, they rescue a captive girl. It was one of the first videos banned by MTV, due to its opening sequence featuring the captive girl (played by International Chrysis) being tied up and fondled against her will by a pair of dwarves. At the end of the video, she is revealed to be a man cross-dressing. The ban was eventually lifted, as MTV Classic would later air the video.

=== Charts ===
"Oh, Pretty Woman" was Van Halen's second Top 20 hit in the United States, peaking at number 12 on the Billboard Hot 100, and peaked at number one on the Billboard Mainstream Rock chart.

Weekly charts
Chart (1982)	Peak position
Australia (Kent Music Report)	59
Belgium (Ultratop 50 Flanders)	40
Canada Top Singles (RPM)	15
Italy (Musica e dischi)	40
Netherlands (Single Top 100)	28
New Zealand (Recorded Music NZ)	47
UK Singles (OCC)	47
US Billboard Hot 100	12
US Mainstream Rock (Billboard)	1
US Cash Box Top 100	10

Year-end charts
Chart (1982)	Rank
Canada (RPM)	51
US Top Pop Singles (Billboard)	88
US Cash Box Top 100	66

== Sylvie Vartan version (in French) ==
"L'homme en noir"

Single by Sylvie Vartan
- Language: French
- English title: The man in black
- B-side: "N’oublie pas qu’il est à moi"
- Released: November 1964
- Recorded: 1964
- Genre: Pop
- Length: 2:48
- Label: RCA Victor
- Songwriters: Roy Orbison, Bill Dees, Georges Aber

Sylvie Vartan singles chronology
"Sha la la" (1964)	"L'homme en noir" (1964)	"Dans tes bras" (1965)

In 1964, the song was adapted into French by Georges Aber as L'homme en noir ("The man in black") and performed by French pop singer Sylvie Vartan and backed by her brother Eddie's orchestra, released as a single in January 1965 as a non-album single. This version presents the "man in black" as a gunfighter who may or may not return to the woman who loves him. The single was backed by Aber's French adaption of "Can't You See That She's Mine" by the Dave Clark Five, entitled N'oublie pas qu'il est à moi ("Don't forget he's mine"). Vartan's version peaked at Number 15 on the Ultratop 50 charts in Wallonia in March 1965. Vartan had previously covered Orbison's "Dream Baby" in French as Cri de ma vie ("Cry of my life") on her 1962 debut album Sylvie, but it was not released as a single.

=== Charts ===
Chart (1964–1965)	Peak position
Belgium (Ultratop 50 Wallonia)	15

== Other notable covers ==
During the UK leg of the American Heart World Tour in 2025, supporting act Elliot James Reay sang what was reported to be "a brilliant cover" of Pretty Woman, even though he and his band had only two days to rehearse the song before the first show in Belfast. Reay has repeatedly cited Orbison as a massive influence on his own work in interviews.

== See also ==
- List of Billboard Mainstream Rock number-one songs of the 1980s
