= Blue Angel (song) =

1960 single by Roy Orbison

Single by Roy Orbison

from the album Lonely and Blue
- B-side: "Today's Teardrops"
- Published: September 19, 1960 Acuff-Rose Publications, Inc.
- Released: August 1960
- Recorded: August 8, 1960
- Studio: RCA Victor Studio B, Nashville, Tennessee
- Genre: Pop rock
- Length: 2:43
- Label: Monument
- Songwriters: Roy Orbison; Joe Melson
- Producer: Fred Foster

Roy Orbison singles chronology
"Only the Lonely (Know the Way I Feel)" (1960)	"Blue Angel" (1960)	"I'm Hurtin'" (1960)

"Blue Angel" is a song by Roy Orbison, released as a single in August 1960. Released as the follow-up to the international hit "Only the Lonely (Know the Way I Feel)", "Blue Angel" peaked at number nine on the Billboard Hot 100 and number eleven on the UK's Record Retailer Top 50.

== Background and release ==
"Blue Angel" followed its predecessor, "Only the Lonely (Know the Way I Feel)", in very much the same style with Orbison once again able to show off his falsetto and semi-operatic vocals and also followed its theme of lost love. However, whilst "Only the Lonely" was a gloomy song of self-pity, "Blue Angel" was, according to musician and writer John Kruth, "a dollop of commercial fluff… [and that] lyrically, it was rather sappy, a trite knock-off about teen love, all too typical of its time. Its power lay in its simple but insidious melody."

Co-writer Joe Melson came up with the song after receiving a speeding ticket. He had just become a father for the second time and was on his way to the hospital when he was pulled over by a police officer who after hearing Melson pleading about why said "You won't be a father very long speedin' like that". Following this, Melson decided to write a song about this event, coming up with "Blue Angel". Orbison recorded the song on August 8, 1960, at RCA Victor Studio B in Nashville, Tennessee, and was then quickly released as a single at the end of August with the B-side "Today's Teardrops", written by a then-relatively unknown Gene Pitney. Whilst the single was first released on Monument Records in the US, its UK release came in October 1960 on parent label London Records when "Only the Lonely (Know the Way I Feel)" was top of the charts there.

== Personnel ==
- Roy Orbison – vocals
- Hank Garland – guitar
- Harold Bradley – guitar
- Bob Moore – double bass
- Floyd Cramer – piano
- Buddy Harman – drums
- Boots Randolph – saxophone
- Anita Kerr Singers – backing vocals
- Joe Melson – backing vocals

== Charts ==
Chart (1960–61)	Peak position
Australia (Kent Music Report)	28
Canada (CHUM)	14
Ireland (Evening Herald)	8
UK Disc Top 20	17
UK Melody Maker Top 20	11
UK New Musical Express Top 30	10
UK Record Mirror Top 20	13
UK Record Retailer Top 50	11
US Billboard Hot 100	9
US Hot R&B/Hip-Hop Songs (Billboard)	23
US Cash Box Top 100	13
