= Running Scared (Roy Orbison song) =

1961 song written by Roy Orbison and Joe Melson

Single by Roy Orbison

from the album Crying
- B-side: "Love Hurts"
- Published: April 10, 1961 Acuff-Rose Publications, Inc.
- Released: March 1961
- Recorded: February 27, 1961
- Studio: RCA Victor Studio B, Nashville
- Length: 2:10
- Label: Monument 438
- Songwriters: "Running Scared": Roy Orbison, Joe Melson "Love Hurts": Boudleaux Bryant
- Producer: Fred Foster

Roy Orbison singles chronology
"I'm Hurtin'" (1960)	"Running Scared" (1961)	"Crying" (1961)

Audio sample
- "Running Scared": file; help

"Running Scared" is a song written by Roy Orbison and Joe Melson and sung by Orbison. An operatic rock ballad, the recording of the song was overseen by audio engineer Bill Porter and released as a 45 rpm single by Monument Records in March 1961 and went to number one on the Billboard Hot 100 chart. "Running Scared" also reached No.9 in the UK Singles Chart. It sold over one million copies in the US alone. The song was included on Orbison's 1962 album Crying as the final track on the album.

== Background ==
Noted for being a song written without a chorus, the song builds in the lyrics, arrangement, and vocals to a climax that, without vibrato, demonstrates the power of Orbison's clear, full voice. It is written in the bolero style; Orbison is credited with bringing this to the rock genre. Fred Foster, producer of the session and of Monument Records, did not want the powerful high note that ends the song to end in falsetto but in full or natural voice. According to Foster, the last note that ends the song is G above (G5) High C (C5) in full natural voice. The note is actually tenor high A (A4), over Middle C (C4).

While "Running Scared" was an international hit, the B-side "Love Hurts" also picked up significant airplay in Australia. Consequently, chart figures for Australia show "Running Scared"/"Love Hurts" as a double A-side, both sides peaking at number five. This makes Orbison's recording of "Love Hurts" the first version to be a hit. "Love Hurts" later became better known in a version by rock band Nazareth, who had an international hit with it in 1975.

== Charts ==
Chart (1961)	Peak position
UK Singles (Official Charts)	9
US Billboard Hot 100	1

== Covers and popular culture ==
- Jack Scott, a Canadian-born rockabilly singer from the same era, also had a minor 1962 hit with "Running Scared". He later re-recorded it in 1990 for one of his compilation albums, Jack Scott's Greatest Hits.
- Bob Luman released a version of the song as a single in 1967. It did not chart.
- Glen Campbell recorded the song on his 1973 album Glen Travis Campbell.
- The Fools on their 1981 album Heavy Mental, reaching No. 50 on the Billboard Hot 100.
- Nick Cave and the Bad Seeds on their 1986 album Kicking Against the Pricks.
- Brokeback on their 2001 album Morse Code in the Modern Age: Across the Americas.
- John Peel, the British BBC Radio DJ who died in 2004, listed "Running Scared" by Roy Orbison as one of the songs to be played at his memorial service.
- Jeff Lynne on his 2012 album Long Wave.
- Del Shannon recorded the song for his 1965 album 1,661 Seconds with Del Shannon and sang the finale "with me" just as Orbison had, in full voice, not falsetto.
- The song was used for the trailer for the 2017 horror film Jigsaw.

== See also ==
- List of Billboard Hot 100 number-one singles of 1961
