= Jim Vienneau =

American record producer (1926–2023)

- Born: James Francis Vienneau; September 18, 1926; Albany, New York, U.S.
- Died: November 9, 2023 (aged 97); Nashville, Tennessee, U.S.
- Occupation: Record producer
- Years active: 1956–1989
- Relatives: Frank Buckley Walker (uncle)

James Francis Vienneau (September 18, 1926 – November 9, 2023) was an American record producer. He is best known for producing "It's Only Make Believe" by Conway Twitty.

== Childhood ==
Vienneau was born on September 18, 1926, to Marian Catherine "Mary" (née Boyne) (1891–1989) and Alfred Edmond Vienneau (1886–1966), in Albany, New York. He had two older siblings, Alfred Edmond (1918–1920) and Edmond Boyne "Ed" (1923–1995) Vienneau. Alfred Vienneau was an electrical salesman who was originally from New Brunswick, Canada, and Mary Boyne Vienneau was a housewife originally from Philmont, New York. When Jim was a toddler, the family moved to North Hempstead and later to Queens, New York. His maternal uncle was fellow music producer and mentor Frank Walker, the husband of Marian Vienneau's sister Laura Walker.

== Early career and success with Conway Twitty ==
As a young man, he was mentored in producing music by his uncle Frank Walker, a producer of hit singers like Bessie Smith and Hank Williams, In 1956, he was signed as a producer by the president of MGM Records, Arnold Maxin, and began working out of the company's offices on Broadway, commuting to Nashville at times for recording sessions. He signed his most famous client Conway Twitty two years later and produced the Billboard Hot 100 number-one hit, "It's Only Make Believe" in 1958. Originally, he decided not to sign Twitty, but was overruled by Arnold Maxin. He ended up being the producer for many of Twitty's songs from 1958 to 1963.

== Other clients ==
Over the next 30 years or so, Vienneau continued to produce songs for many other successful artists including Connie Francis, Hank Williams Jr., Roy Orbison, Mark Dinning, Bob Gallion, Mel Tillis, Marvin Rainwater, and Billy ThunderKloud & the Chieftones. His most successful hit for Connie Francis was the song "Vacation", which peaked at number 9 on the Billboard Hot 100 in 1962. In 1960, he produced the latter of his two Billboard Hot 100 number-one singles, "Teen Angel" for Mark Dinning. The song "Whole Lotta Woman" by Marvin Rainwater ended up being a hit in the United Kingdom, and was a number-one hit on the UK Singles Chart. He continued to produce music until his retirement in 1989.

== Personal life and death ==
Vienneau lived in Nashville, Tennessee. He and his wife Joan Preston Vienneau were married for over 60 years.

Vienneau died at his Nashville home on November 9, 2023, at the age of 97.
