= Wesley Rose =

American music industry executive and record producer (1918–1990)

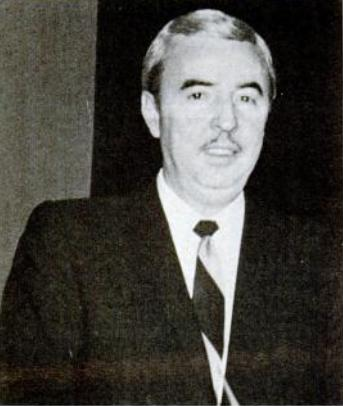
- Rose in 1965
- Born: February 11, 1918; Chicago, Illinois, U.S.
- Died: April 26, 1990 (aged 72); Nashville, Tennessee, United States
- Occupation(s): Music executive, record producer
- Known for: Acuff-Rose Music publishing with Roy Acuff
- Family: Fred Rose

Wesley Rose (born February 11, 1918 – April 26, 1990) was an American music industry executive and record producer.

== Biography ==
The son of songwriter Fred Rose, he was born in Chicago and studied to become a chartered accountant. He eventually moved to Nashville and in 1945 he became involved in Acuff-Rose Music, a music publishing house established by his father and his father's partner, Roy Acuff. Following his father's death in 1954, Rose served as the company's president. He proved to be a capable businessman, expanding the business significantly and establishing Acuff-Rose affiliate offices around the world.

Rose was an important part of the development of the country music industry. He was a driving force behind the creation of the Country Music Association (CMA) and was the first Nashville publisher to serve on the board of directors of the American Society of Composers, Authors, and Publishers (ASCAP) and the Music Publishers Association.

In 1985, he and partner Roy Acuff sold the Acuff-Rose catalogues to the Gaylord Broadcasting Company. In 1986, Rose joined his father as an inductee in the Country Music Hall of Fame.

Rose died in Nashville in 1990.
