= Bill Dees =

American musician and songwriter

- Born: William Marvin Dees; January 24, 1939; Borger, Texas, United States
- Died: October 24, 2012 (aged 73) Mountain Home, Arkansas, United States
- Genre: Country
- Occupation: Singer-songwriter
- Instrument: Vocals
- Years active: 1959–2012
- Formerly of: Roy Orbison

William Marvin Dees (January 24, 1939 – October 24, 2012) was an American musician known for his songwriting collaborations with singer Roy Orbison.

== Career ==
Born and based out of Borger, Texas, United States, Dees played guitar and sang with a band called The Five Bops doing his first recordings with Norman Petty at his recording studio in Clovis, New Mexico in May 1958. They later became The Whirlwinds, gaining enough recognition to perform on an Amarillo, Texas radio station. Dees eventually made his way to Nashville, Tennessee, where his meeting with Roy Orbison led to a collaboration that produced a string of successful songs for Monument Records, including the hits "Oh, Pretty Woman" and "It's Over".

In 1967, Dees co-wrote all the songs for the Orbison album and MGM motion picture The Fastest Guitar Alive.

Beyond his work with Orbison, Bill Dees wrote hundreds of songs, a number of which were recorded by performers such as Johnny Cash, Loretta Lynn, Skeeter Davis, Glen Campbell, Billy Joe Royal, Frank Ifield, Mark Dinning, and Gene Pitney. In 2000, he recorded his own album titled Saturday Night at the Movies, a compilation of songs previously sung by Orbison that had been written with Dees and some that Dees had written alone.

Bill Dees lived in Ozark, Arkansas & New Boston, Texas, for a number of years. There he continued writing and playing his music. Later he resided near Branson, Missouri, and continued to write songs with collaborator Jack Pribek until his death on October 24, 2012. He was living at a nursing facility in Mountain Home, Arkansas, at the time of his death.
