= Live from Australia (Roy Orbison album) =

Video by Roy Orbison
- Released: April 5, 2005
- Recorded: October 3, 1972
- Venues: Festival Hall, Melbourne, Australia
- Length: 90:00
- Label: Image Entertainment
- Director: Graeme Arthur

Roy Orbison – Live from Australia is a 1972 performance by American Rock and Roll Hall of Fame legend Roy Orbison from Festival Hall in Melbourne, Australia. In it, Orbison performs the Neil Diamond hit "Sweet Caroline" and Simon & Garfunkel's "Bridge over Troubled Water" plus thirteen of his classic songs backed up by a full orchestra.

It was released in DVD format on April 5, 2005 with addition family films (special features) under the supervision of Barbara Orbison. The black and white music portion (actual concert) has been broadcast in the United States on the PBS television network.

Running time: 90 minutes

== Track listing ==
1. "Only the Lonely"
2. "Crying"
3. "Dream Baby"
4. "In Dreams"
5. "Mean Woman Blues"
6. "Too Soon To Know"
7. "Penny Arcade"
8. "Blue Bayou"
9. "Land of a Thousand Dances"
10. "Bridge Over Troubled Water"
11. "Leah" with encore
12. "Running Scared"
13. "Sweet Caroline"
14. "It's Over"
15. "Oh, Pretty Woman" with encore

Recorded: October 3, 1972

- Roy Orbison - vocals, guitar,
- Billy Dean - guitar, vocals
- Alan James - guitar
- Terry Widlake - bass guitar
- Alan Mayes - trumpet
- Bob Munday - drums
- Gordon Balsmouth - piano
