= Laminar Flow (album) =

Studio album by Roy Orbison
- Released: May 16, 1979
- Recorded: February 1979
- Genre: Disco, rock, pop
- Length: 34:20
- Label: Asylum
- Producer: Clayton Ivey, Terry Woodford

Roy Orbison chronology
Regeneration (1976)	Laminar Flow (1979)	Class of '55 (1986)

Singles from Laminar Flow
- 1. "Easy Way Out" Released: May 1979; 2. "Poor Baby" Released: October 1979

Laminar Flow is an album by the American musician Roy Orbison. It was recorded at Wishbone Recording Studio in Muscle Shoals, Alabama, and released on May 16, 1979, by Asylum Records. It was the last album of new material Orbison would release in his lifetime. His next studio effort, In Dreams, featured re-recordings of old Orbison hits while Mystery Girl and King of Hearts, his final collections of all-new material, were released posthumously. "Hound Dog Man" is a tribute to Elvis Presley.

== Critical reception ==
Professional ratings
Review scores
Source	Rating
AllMusic	2.5/5 stars
The Encyclopedia of Popular Music	2/5 stars
MusicHound Rock: The Essential Album Guide	2/5 stars
Rolling Stone	(unfavorable)
Record Mirror	2/5 stars

The Los Angeles Times called it "a collection of easy-listening pop that shows the Orbison pipes to be in glorious form." Suggesting that while "it was a bit of a departure" from his sound, Billboard notes that "he still knows his way around a ballad as in 'Love is a Cold Wind', 'I Care', 'Poor Baby'." Cashbox stated, "The album has a decidedly MOR feel to it, but there are exceptions like 'Lay It Down', a nifty rocker."

The Globe and Mail wrote that "Laminar Flow is a travesty: disco, fake disco and fake California rock form the backgrounds while poor Roy (who still sings well) flounders atop with absolutely no confidence." Lindsay Jones of Record Mirror called the album "kind of boring" and claimed that, "from the over-thirties-night disco of 'Easy Way Out' and the watered-down funk of 'Lay It Down', through to the half-hearted rocker 'Movin', Orbison tries for 'variety'."

William Ruhlmann of AllMusic notes that "'Easy Way Out' and 'Friday Night' "employ trendy disco beats, while 'Lay It Down' and 'Warm Spot Hot' settle for funk... Trying for different radio formats, 'Tears' is one of several contemporary-sounding ballads seemingly intended for adult contemporary radio."

== Track listing ==
Side one

1. "Easy Way Out" – (Jim Valentini, Frank Saulino, Spady Brannan)
2. "Love Is a Cold Wind" – (Charlie Black, Rory Bourke)
3. "Lay It Down" – (Robert Byrne, Tommy Brasfield)
4. "I Care" – (Lenny LeBlanc, Eddie Struzick)
5. "We're Into Something Good" – (George Soulé, Terry Woodford)
6. "Movin'" – (Roy Orbison, Chris Price)

Side two

1. "Poor Baby" – (Roy Orbison, Chris Price, Regi Price)
2. "Warm Spot Hot" – (Eddie Struzick)
3. "Tears" – (Roy Orbison, Chris Price, Dan Price, Regi Price)
4. "Friday Night" – (Regi Price, Chris Price)
5. "Hound Dog Man" – (Barbara Orbison, Terry Woodford, Tommy Stuart)

== Personnel ==
- Roy Orbison – vocals
- Larry Byrom, Mac McAnally – acoustic guitar
- Bill Hinds, Robert Byrne, Tippy Armstrong – guitar
- Lenny LeBlanc – drums, acoustic guitar, backing vocals
- Bob Wray, Lonnie Ledford – bass guitar
- Clayton Ivey – keyboards
- Roger Clark – drums, synthesizer
- Mickey Buckins, Tom Roady – percussion
- Jim Horn – tenor saxophone, baritone saxophone
- Harvey Thompson – tenor saxophone
- Ronald Eades – baritone saxophone
- Harrison Calloway – trumpet
- Charles Rose – trombone
- Barbara Wyrick, Chris Price, Eddie Struzick, Marie Tomlinson, Robert Byrne, Suzy Storm, Terry Woodford – backing vocals
