= She's a Mystery to Me =

1989 single by Roy Orbison

Single by Roy Orbison

from the album Mystery Girl
- Released: February 7, 1989
- Recorded: September 15, 1988
- Studio: A&M
- Length: 4:16
- Label: Virgin
- Songwriters: Bono, The Edge
- Producer: Bono

Roy Orbison singles chronology
"You Got It" (1989)	"She's a Mystery to Me" (1989)	"California Blue" (1989)

Music video
- "She's a Mystery to Me" on YouTube

"She's a Mystery to Me" is a song by Roy Orbison, written by Bono and The Edge. It was released on Orbison's final (posthumous) album, Mystery Girl (also inspiring the album title), and as the album's second single in March 1989. The song was received favorably by several music critics and is considered one of the highlights of the album.

== Composition ==
During a restless night of sleep in June 1987 in London during U2's Joshua Tree Tour, Bono slept with the soundtrack to the film Blue Velvet CD on repeat. The CD had been given to him by the Edge's wife. The soundtrack includes the song "In Dreams" by Orbison. When he woke the following morning, Bono had a tune in his head which he assumed was from the soundtrack. He soon realised it wasn't, so he wrote down the basic structure of the song. Later that day he sang the unfinished song to the band at their pre-concert soundcheck at Wembley Arena. After the concert, Orbison paid the band an unannounced visit backstage, where a perplexed Bono played the song for him. Bono and Orbison worked again on the song in mid-November in Los Angeles. The album Mystery Girl was named after the song's chorus ("She's a mystery to me, she's a mystery girl...").

== Music video ==
The video for the song was directed by David Fincher and it aired first in April 1989. Two versions of the video were made and both were broadcast by MTV and other outlets, though one more often than the other. Each version depicted the buildup to a woman departing on an airplane voyage. In the more popular video, she is planning to leave with a rich lover, while a faceless protagonist seen mostly in closeups of black cowboy boots (suggesting the late singer himself) helplessly watches her leave him behind. In the alternate version, the ending reveals that the woman is actually a pre-adolescent girl about to board the plane, with an older woman (suggesting her mother) arriving at the gate at takeoff; the girl abandons the plane and tearfully reunites with the woman. The same actress portrays both the pursued woman in the former video and the pursuer in the latter. The Mystery Girl in both versions of the video is played by Ali Hewson.

== Reception ==
Critical reception towards the song was overwhelmingly positive. BBC's Chris Jones praised the song, calling it "a true rarity". Rolling Stone called the song one of the best on the album. Reviewer Michael Azerrad wrote that the song vaguely sounded like U2 and compared Orbison's phrasing to that of Bono, but felt the chorus' singing style was distinctly Orbison's. Pitchfork Media felt the song revealed "wrinkles" in Orbison's voice, but wrote that it only added "texture and authority" to the song. Allmusic wrote that the song was a highlight on the album; a haunting ballad, which was a perfect showcase to Orbison's vocal talent. Cash Box said it was "more rambling than the usual pointed material Roy excelled at" but that "it’s a still a strong offering."

The song was featured in the film Aquaman in the scene where Arthur Curry and Mera arrived in Sicily, Italy.

== Formats and track listings ==
7-inch vinyl: Virgin Canada (VS 1485)
No.	Title	Length
1.	"She's a Mystery to Me"	4:14
2.	"Crying" (featuring k.d. lang)	3:44

12-inch vinyl: Virgin UK (VST 1173)
No.	Title	Length
1.	"She's a Mystery to Me"	4:14
2.	"Dream Baby" (live)	2:58
3.	"Crying" (featuring k.d. lang)	3:44

CD: Virgin UK (VSCDT1173)
No.	Title	Length
1.	"She's a Mystery to Me"	4:14
2.	"Dream Baby" (live)	2:58
3.	"Crying" (featuring k.d. lang)	3:44

== Personnel ==
- Roy Orbison – vocals, electric guitar
- Bono – electric guitar
- Benmont Tench – piano
- The Edge - cheap strings
- Howie Epstein – bass guitar
- Jim Keltner – drums

== Charts ==
=== Weekly charts ===
Chart (1989)	Peak position
Australia Singles Chart	17
Dutch Single Top 100	19
Irish Singles Chart	5
Italy Airplay (Music & Media)	15
New Zealand Top 40	30
UK Singles Chart	27
US Adult Contemporary (Billboard)	23
US Mainstream Rock Airplay (Billboard)	26
