= Blue Velvet (soundtrack) =

1986 soundtrack album by Angelo Badalamenti

Blue Velvet (Original Motion Picture Soundtrack)

Soundtrack album by Angelo Badalamenti
- Released: 1986
- Genre: Soundtrack
- Length: 43:03
- Label: Varèse Sarabande

Professional ratings
Review scores
Source	Rating
AllMusic	4.5/5 stars

Blue Velvet (Original Motion Picture Soundtrack) is the soundtrack album to the 1986 film Blue Velvet, written and directed by David Lynch. It includes original music by composer and conductor Angelo Badalamenti. It was released in 1986 on Varèse Sarabande.

The soundtrack is a dark combination of classic composition and vintage/modern pop songs, which mirrors the film's un-stated timeless setting envisioned by Lynch and unsettling neo-noir atmosphere.

Thus, the film has become noted for its diverse musical selections. Seen as a prominent stylistic feature in the film is also the unconventional use of vintage pop songs, such as Bobby Vinton's "Blue Velvet" and Roy Orbison's "In Dreams", juxtaposed with an orchestral score.

Badalamenti's score alludes to Shostakovich's 15th Symphony, which Lynch had been listening to regularly while writing the screenplay.

== Background and music ==
Lynch worked with Badalamenti for the first time in this film and asked him to write a score that had to be "like Shostakovich, be very Russian, but make it the most beautiful thing but make it dark and a little bit scary." Badalamenti would later go on to contribute to all of Lynch's future full-length films except for Inland Empire (2006).

Inspired by This Mortal Coil's recent cover of Tim Buckley's "Song to the Siren", Lynch had wanted Isabella Rossellini to sing her own version, but was unable to secure the rights. In its place, Badalamenti composed a music for "Mysteries of Love" with lyrics by Lynch sung by Julee Cruise.

Vinton's cover of the Clovers' 1950s song "Blue Velvet" served as inspiration for the film and heavily incorporated it.

== Legacy ==
Entertainment Weekly ranked Blue Velvet at #100 on their list of the 100 Greatest Film Soundtracks: "The haunting soundtrack accompanies the title credits, then weaves through the narrative, accentuating the noir mood of the film." — Critic John Alexander

== Track listing ==
No.	Title	Artist	Length
1.	"Main Title"		1:27
2.	"Night Streets / Sandy and Jeffrey"		3:42
3.	"Frank"		3:34
4.	"Jeffrey's Dark Side"		1:48
5.	"Mysteries of Love" (French horn solo)		2:10
6.	"Frank Returns"		4:39
7.	"Mysteries of Love" (instrumental)		4:41
8.	"Blue Velvet / Blue Star" (montage)	Isabella Rossellini	3:14
9.	"Lumberton U.S.A. / Going Down to Lincoln"		2:13
10.	"Akron Meets the Blues"		2:40
11.	"Honky Tonk, Pt. 1"	Bill Doggett	3:09
12.	"In Dreams"	Roy Orbison	2:48
13.	"Love Letters"	Ketty Lester	2:36
14.	"Mysteries of Love"	Julee Cruise	4:22
Total length:			41:32

== Personnel ==
- Angelo Badalamenti – Composer, Conductor, Contractor
- Julee Cruise – Performer
- Carmine d'Amico – Guitar, Guitar (Electric), Contractor
- Chris d'Amico – Bass (Electric)
- Bill Doggett – Organ, Performer
- Dan Hersch – Digital Editing, Digital Transfers
- Richard Kraft – Executive Producer
- Ketty Lester – Performer
- David Lynch – Conductor
- Roy Markowitz – Drums
- Tom Null – Executive Producer
- Roy Orbison – Performer
- Wayne Sabella – Piano
- Jiri Sobac – Engineer

== Releases ==
The first official release (on LP, tape and CD) was released in late 1986. A 2CD deluxe edition with previously unissued material was released in 2021.

== Additional music ==
Despite being the title track and prominently featured in the movie, the Bobby Vinson recording of "Blue Velvet" is not included on the soundtrack album. In addition, the songs "Livin' for Your Lover" and "Gone Ridin'" by Chris Isaak also appear in the movie, and are not on the soundtrack album.

== Charts ==
Chart performance
Chart (2026)	Peak position
Croatian International Albums (HDU)	38
