= California Blue =

1989 single by Roy Orbison

- US and Canadian artwork

Single by Roy Orbison

from the album Mystery Girl
- B-side: "In Dreams"
- Released: July 1989
- Recorded: April 1988
- Studio: Mike Campbell's garage (Los Angeles)
- Length: 3:53
- Label: Virgin
- Songwriters: Roy Orbison, Jeff Lynne, Tom Petty
- Producer: Jeff Lynne

Roy Orbison singles chronology
"She's a Mystery to Me" (1989)	"California Blue" (1989)	"Oh, Pretty Woman" (1989)

"California Blue" is a song written by Roy Orbison, Jeff Lynne, and Tom Petty. According to The Authorized Roy Orbison, Orbison recorded the song in April 1988 at Mike Campbell's garage in Los Angeles. "California Blue" was released as a single from Orbison's 22nd studio album, Mystery Girl, in July 1989, reaching the top 40 in Belgium, Ireland, and West Germany.

== Personnel ==
- Roy Orbison – vocals, backing vocals, acoustic guitar
- Jeff Lynne – backing vocals, electric guitar, keyboards, bass guitar, producer
- Tom Petty – backing vocals, acoustic guitar
- Mike Campbell – acoustic guitar, mandolin
- Ian Wallace – drums, percussion

== Charts ==
Chart (1989)	Peak position
Australia (ARIA)	65
Belgium (Ultratop 50 Flanders)	25
Canada Top Singles (RPM)	75
Canada Country Singles (RPM)	58
Ireland (IRMA)	23
UK Singles (Official Charts)	77
US Adult Contemporary (Billboard)	44
US Hot Country Songs (Billboard)	51
West Germany (GfK)	34
