= One of the Lonely Ones =

Studio album by Roy Orbison
- Released: December 4, 2015
- Recorded: 1969
- Genre: Pop, rock and roll
- Length: 33:37
- Label: Universal

Roy Orbison chronology
King of Hearts (1992)	One of the Lonely Ones (2015)

One of the Lonely Ones is a posthumous Roy Orbison album which was released on December 4, 2015. It is his 24th and, to date, final studio album. Orbison recorded it in 1969. The album, which Orbison recorded surreptitiously in the aftermath of his wife Claudette's death in a motorcycle accident and the death of his two sons in a house fire 2 years later, was long believed lost.

== History ==
In the summer of 1968, Roy Orbison was touring the UK when he met his second wife Barbara Orbison at a nightclub in Leeds. On September 15, 1968, he got the news that his home had burned down and his two eldest sons had died. He took a break for the rest of 1968. On January 21, 1969, Orbison went into the studio to record an album related to the tragedy. After the death of his sons, he went into exile when he was scheduled to be promoting his then current album, Roy Orbison's Many Moods which was delayed to May 1969. Orbison recorded until March 19 so he could tour. After the tour was completed in July, he went back into the studio to record and finished this album on August 2. Because of contract disputes, MGM Records shelved One of the Lonely Ones, and it had remained unreleased and unheard until 2015. The album was thought to have been lost forever, but was discovered by Orbison's family.

== Reception ==
Professional ratings
Review scores
Source	Rating
Allmusic	3.5/5 stars

Stephen Thomas Erlewine of AllMusic compared the album to Orbison's 1969 LP Roy Orbison's Many Moods, claiming that that album's title is more suitable to this record "because this contains a rare rocker in "Child Woman, Woman Child," along with an effective evocation of his classic Monument ballads in the title track, a nimble bit of country-psychedelia in "Give Up," a good bit of fuzz-colored schmaltz in "Little Girl (In the Big City)," and an effective reading of two Mickey Newbury songs ("Leaving Makes the Rain Come Down," "Sweet Memories")"

== Track listing ==
Side one
No.	Title	Writer(s)	Length
1.	"You'll Never Walk Alone"	Richard Rodgers; Oscar Hammerstein II	2:07
2.	"Say No More"	Boudleaux Bryant	3:00
3.	"Leaving Makes the Rain Come Down"	Mickey Newbury	2:52
4.	"Sweet Memories"	Newbury	2:49
5.	"Laurie"	Roy Orbison; Bill Dees	2:33
6.	"One of the Lonely Ones"	Orbison; Dees	2:37

Side two
No.	Title	Writer(s)	Length
1.	"Child Woman, Woman Child"	Orbison; Dees	3:23
2.	"The Defector"	Orbison; Dees; Angie Morrow	2:04
3.	"Give Up"	Orbison; Dees	3:07
4.	"Little Girl (In the Big City)"	Dees	3:07
5.	"After Tonight"	Sammy King	3:22
6.	"I Will Always"	Don Gibson	2:42
Total length:			33:37

== Charts ==
Chart (2015)	Peak position
Australian Albums (ARIA)	40
