= Mystery Girl =

Studio album by Roy Orbison
- Released: January 30, 1989
- Recorded: July 1987 – November 1988
- Studios: Rumbo, Los Angeles; A&M, Hollywood; FPSHOT, Oxfordshire
- Length: 38:17
- Label: Virgin
- Producers: Roy Orbison; Mike Campbell; Jeff Lynne; T Bone Burnett; Barbara Orbison; Bono

Roy Orbison chronology
In Dreams: The Greatest Hits (1987)	Mystery Girl (1989)	A Black & White Night Live (1989)

Singles from Mystery Girl
- 1. "You Got It" Released: January 3, 1989; 2. "She's a Mystery to Me" Released: February 7, 1989; 3. "California Blue" Released: June 1989

Mystery Girl is the twenty-second album by American singer Roy Orbison. It was his last album recorded during his lifetime, completed in November 1988, a month before his death at age 52. Released posthumously by Virgin Records on January 30, 1989, it includes the hit singles "You Got It", which was co-written by Orbison and his Traveling Wilburys bandmates Jeff Lynne and Tom Petty, and "She's a Mystery to Me", written by Bono and The Edge. The album was a critical and commercial success, peaking at number 5 on the Billboard 200 in the United States, the highest position Orbison had achieved on that chart, and number 2 on the UK Albums Chart.

Mystery Girl was Orbison's first album of all-new material since 1979 and its success posthumously continued the resurgence that his career had undergone since 1986. Among the many other contributors to the album were Mike Campbell and other members of the Heartbreakers, T Bone Burnett, George Harrison, Jim Keltner and Rick Vito. For the 25th anniversary of its release, the album was reissued with bonus tracks including "The Way Is Love", a song recorded by Orbison on a cassette tape in the 1980s that was subsequently completed by his sons and producer John Carter Cash.

== Recording ==
Before making Mystery Girl, Roy Orbison's last album of new material had been 1979's Laminar Flow. This release followed a run of commercial and critical failures in the United States since his years of international stardom in the early 1960s. From 1986, support from admirers such as filmmaker David Lynch and Bruce Springsteen reversed this trend, rescuing him from relative obscurity in his homeland as Orbison again became a popular concert draw. According to The Authorized Roy Orbison, recordings for Mystery Girl began in July 1987 at Ocean Way Studios in Hollywood with the track "(All I Can Do is) Dream You". Jeff Lynne, another long-time admirer, began writing songs with Orbison in Los Angeles over Christmas 1987. The track "You Got It" was written at this time and was a collaboration between Lynne, Orbison and Tom Petty. With Lynne as his producer, Orbison recorded "You Got It" in April 1988 at the garage studio of Petty's bandmate in the Heartbreakers, Mike Campbell.

Recording for the album continued alongside Orbison's involvement in the Traveling Wilburys, a supergroup project initiated by George Harrison and Lynne that also included Petty and Bob Dylan. Aside from further Lynne-produced sessions for Mystery Girl, to which Petty and Harrison contributed, Orbison recorded some of the songs with Campbell, T Bone Burnett and his wife Barbara Orbison each in the role of producer. The Heartbreakers played on much of the album. Elvis Costello contributed the song "The Comedians" from his 1984 album Goodbye Cruel World, though in performances Orbison subtly altered the lyric to the feminine "Comediennes" which he felt better suited the song.

The album was named after the chorus from the track "She's a Mystery to Me", which was written by U2's Bono and The Edge. In the documentary In Dreams: The Roy Orbison Story, Bono says he woke up for a concert soundcheck, following a late night listening to the soundtrack to Lynch's Blue Velvet, and had the tune of the title song in his head, figuring it was another Orbison song ("In Dreams" was the only Orbison song on that album). During the soundcheck, he performed "She's a Mystery to Me" for the other members of U2, who agreed that it sounded like an Orbison song. In an eery coincidence, that very night, after the show, there was a knock on their dressing room door and they opened it to find Orbison (who they were unaware was attending the show.) He told them how much he enjoyed their performance and asked if they might be interested in writing a song for his new album.

Recording for the album was completed in November 1988. Having maintained a busy schedule of concert performances, Orbison told Johnny Cash at this time that he was experiencing chest pains and would need to do something about his health. On December 6, two days after performing a show in Highland Heights, Ohio, Orbison died of a heart attack, at the age of 52.

== Release and reception ==
Professional ratings
Review scores
Source	Rating
AllMusic	4/5 stars
The Rolling Stone Album Guide	3/5 stars
Robert Christgau	B
Record Mirror	5/5 stars
Encyclopedia of Popular Music	4/5 stars
Houston Chronicle	4/5 stars
Los Angeles Times	3.5/4 stars
MusicHound Rock	3/5
Music Story	4/5 stars
Q	5/5 stars
Rolling Stone	4/5 stars

Mystery Girl was Orbison's first significant critical and commercial success as a solo artist since the mid-1960s. It was released on January 30, 1989, in the UK and on February 7, 1989, in the US and followed the Wilburys' Traveling Wilburys Vol. 1 into the higher reaches of the US albums chart. On April 8, 1989, Orbison became the first deceased musician since Elvis Presley to have two albums in the top five positions in the US, with the Traveling Wilburys album at number 4 and Mystery Girl at number 5. This was the highest placing he had achieved for an album in the US, and the single, "You Got It", which peaked at number 9, was Orbison's first top 20 hit on the Billboard Hot 100 since "Oh, Pretty Woman" in 1964. In the United Kingdom, on the national chart dated to February 11, 1989, Mystery Girl was listed at number 2 (its peak position there), as the compilation The Legendary Roy Orbison was at number 3.

In his contemporary review for the Chicago Tribune, David Silverman lamented that, given the expectations caused by Orbison's death, "the publicity and fanfare have threatened to cheapen the album, reducing it to novelty status while directing attention away from its rightful distinction as one of Orbison's finest works – a comeback to match his legendary status." Silverman especially admired "Dream You" and said that the only weak track was "The Comedians", where "the openly rancorous story" was unsuitable for such "an unrequited romantic" as Orbison. By contrast, New York Times critic Stephen Holden highlighted "The Comedians" as the album's "outstanding song", saying that it was a "witty parody" of Orbison's 1961 hit "Running Scared" that the singer had succeeded in transcending from mere homage due to his expressive vocal. Holden added that, throughout Mystery Girl, "the singing, songwriting and production do a superb job of bringing Orbison up to date without diluting his haunted hyper-romantic fervor." The Deseret News' reviewer described it as a "great, great album" that sealed Orbison's comeback after the Traveling Wilburys' recent success and reinforced what a true loss his death was to popular music. The reviewer admired Orbison's ability to work effectively with his collaborators and highlighted "You Got It" as an "exceptional single" and "She's a Mystery to Me" as "perhaps the best song on the album". Billboard described the album as "fitting testament to the glory of his voice" Andy Strickland of Record Mirror wrote that the album was "honed down to the tightest of arrangements and performed with the Big O's customary excellence."

In May 2014, Mystery Girl was reissued in a 25th anniversary edition. It included bonus material such as demos and a new song, "The Way Is Love", which was completed by John Carter Cash and Orbison's sons from a cassette demo recorded in around 1986.

== Track listing ==
Side one
No.	Title	Writer(s)	Producer(s)	Length
1.	"You Got It"	Roy Orbison, Jeff Lynne, Tom Petty	Jeff Lynne	3:30
2.	"In the Real World"	Richard Kerr, Will Jennings	Roy Orbison, Mike Campbell, Barbara Orbison	3:44
3.	"(All I Can Do Is) Dream You"	Billy Burnette, David Malloy	T-Bone Burnett	3:39
4.	"A Love So Beautiful"	Roy Orbison, Jeff Lynne	Jeff Lynne	3:33
5.	"California Blue"	Roy Orbison, Jeff Lynne, Tom Petty	Jeff Lynne	3:57

Side two
No.	Title	Writer(s)	Producer(s)	Length
6.	"She's a Mystery to Me"	Bono, The Edge	Bono	4:16
7.	"The Comedians"	Elvis Costello	T-Bone Burnett	3:26
8.	"The Only One"	Wesley Orbison, Craig Wiseman	Roy Orbison, Mike Campbell	3:55
9.	"Windsurfer"	Roy Orbison, Bill Dees	Roy Orbison, Mike Campbell	4:01
10.	"Careless Heart"	Roy Orbison, Diane Warren, Albert Hammond	Roy Orbison, Mike Campbell	4:08

Bonus track (2007 reissue)
No.	Title	Writer(s)	Producer(s)	Length
11.	"You May Feel Me Crying"	Richard Kerr, Will Jennings	Brian Eno	4:14

Bonus tracks (2014 Legacy Recordings reissue)
No.	Title	Writer(s)	Length
11.	"The Way Is Love"	Roy Orbison, Bill Dees	4:12
12.	"She's a Mystery to Me" (Studio demo)	Bono, The Edge	4:51
13.	"(All I Can Do Is) Dream You" (Studio demo)	Billy Burnette, David Malloy	4:34
14.	"The Only One" (Studio demo)	Wesley Orbison, Craig Wiseman	5:12
15.	"The Comedians" (Studio demo)	Elvis Costello	3:25
16.	"In the Real World" (Studio demo)	Richard Kerr, Will Jennings	3:38
17.	"California Blue" (Studio demo)	Roy Orbison, Jeff Lynne, Tom Petty	4:42
18.	"Windsurfer" (Work-tape demo)	Roy Orbison, Bill Dees	3:50
19.	"You Are My Love" (Work-tape demo)	Roy Orbison, Bill Dees	2:35

== Personnel ==
Core contributors

- Roy Orbison – vocals, backing vocals, acoustic guitar (tracks 1, 2, 4, 5, 8, 10), electric guitar (track 6)
- Jeff Lynne – electric guitar (tracks 1, 5), acoustic guitar (4), keyboards (tracks 1, 4, 5), piano (track 1), bass guitar (tracks 1, 4, 5), backing vocals (tracks 1, 4, 5, 9)
- Tom Petty – acoustic guitar (tracks 1, 5), backing vocals (tracks 1, 2, 5)
- Michael Utley – string arrangements (tracks 1, 2, 7, 9)
- Mike Campbell – electric guitar (tracks 2, 10), acoustic guitar (tracks 5, 9, 10), bass (tracks 2, 10), mandolin (track 5)
- Jim Keltner – drums (tracks 2, 6–10)
- Howie Epstein – bass guitar (tracks 6, 8, 9), backing vocals (tracks 2, 8–10)
- Benmont Tench – piano (tracks 6, 8–10), organ (track 8), cheap strings (track 6)

Additional musicians

- Phil Jones – drums, percussion (track 1)
- Barbara Orbison – backing vocals (track 2)
- Roy Orbison Jr. – backing vocals (track 2)
- Al Kooper – organ (track 2)
- Billy Burnette – acoustic guitar, backing vocals (track 3)
- Rick Vito – electric guitar, backing vocals (track 3), slide guitar (track 9)
- Tom "T-Bone" Wolk – bass guitar (track 3)
- Buell Neidlinger – arco bass (track 3, 7)
- Mickey Curry – drums (track 3)
- George Harrison – acoustic guitar and background vocals (tracks 1, 4) (uncredited on "You Got It")
- Ray Cooper – drums (track 4)
- Louis Clark – string arrangements (tracks 4, 5)
- Ian Wallace – drums, percussion (track 5)
- Bono – electric guitar (track 6)
- David Rhodes – electric guitar (track 7)
- T Bone Burnett – electric guitar (track 7)
- Mitchell Froom – piano (track 7)
- Jerry Scheff – string bass (track 7)
- David Miner – string bass (track 7)
- Gary Coleman – percussion (track 7)
- Steve Cropper – electric guitar (track 8)
- The Memphis Horns – horns by Jim Horn, arranged by Steve Cropper (track 8)

== Accolades ==
=== Grammy Awards ===
Year	Nominee / work	Award	Result
1990	"You Got It"	Best Pop Vocal Performance – Male	Nominated

== Charts ==
=== Weekly charts ===
Weekly chart performance for Mystery Girl
Chart (1989)	Peak position
Australian Albums (ARIA)	1
Austrian Albums (Ö3 Austria)	4
Belgian Albums (IFPI)	1
Canada Top Albums/CDs (RPM)	1
Danish Albums (IFPI)	1
Dutch Albums (Album Top 100)	1
European Albums (Music & Media)	3
Finnish Albums (Suomen virallinen lista)	2
German Albums (Offizielle Top 100)	4
Greek Albums (IFPI)	1
Irish Albums (IFPI)	1
Japanese Albums (Oricon)	89
New Zealand Albums (RMNZ)	7
Norwegian Albums (VG-lista)	1
Spanish Albums (AFYVE)	5
Swedish Albums (Sverigetopplistan)	1
Swiss Albums (Schweizer Hitparade)	3
UK Albums (Official Charts)	2
US Billboard 200	5

=== Year-end charts ===
Year-end chart performance for Mystery Girl
Chart (1989)	Position
Australian Albums (ARIA)	9
Austrian Albums (Ö3 Austria)	29
Canada Top Albums/CDs (RPM)	8
Dutch Albums (Album Top 100)	17
European Albums (Music & Media)	19
German Albums (Offizielle Top 100)	14
New Zealand Albums (RMNZ)	35
Swiss Albums (Schweizer Hitparade)	26
UK Albums (Gallup)	51
US Billboard 200	42

== Certifications ==
Region	Certification	Certified units/sales
Australia (ARIA)	3× Platinum	260,000
Canada (Music Canada)	3× Platinum	300,000^{^}
Finland (Musiikkituottajat)	Gold	48,518
Germany (BVMI)	Gold	250,000^{^}
Netherlands (NVPI)	Platinum	100,000^{^}
New Zealand (RMNZ)	Platinum	15,000^{^}
Spain (Promusicae)	Platinum	100,000^{^}
Sweden (GLF)	Platinum	100,000^{^}
Switzerland (IFPI Switzerland)	Gold	25,000^{^}
United Kingdom (BPI)	Platinum	300,000^{^}
United States (RIAA)	Platinum	1,000,000^{^}
^{^} Shipments figures based on certification alone.
