= Boys on the Side =

- Theatrical release poster
- Directed by: Herbert Ross
- Written by: Don Roos
- Produced by: Herbert Ross; Arnon Milchan; Steven Reuther
- Starring: Whoopi Goldberg; Mary-Louise Parker; Drew Barrymore
- Cinematography: Donald E. Thorin
- Edited by: Michael R. Miller
- Music by: David Newman
- Production companies: Le Studio Canal+ Regency Enterprises; Alcor Films; New Regency
- Distributed by: Warner Bros.
- Release date: February 3, 1995
- Running time: 117 minutes
- Country: United States
- Language: English
- Budget: $21 million
- Box office: $47.4 million

Boys on the Side is a 1995 American comedy-drama film directed by Herbert Ross (in his final film as a director) and written by Don Roos. It stars Whoopi Goldberg, Mary-Louise Parker, and Drew Barrymore.

Real estate agent Robin finds Jane to share a ride in her car with Jane from New York to Los Angeles. They end up taking Jane's friend Holly with them for the trip west. The three vastly different strangers end up bonding closely on the cross-country road trip.

Boys on the Side was released by Warner Bros. on February 3, 1995. The film received positive reviews and was a moderate box office success by grossing $47.4 million against a $21 million budget.

== Plot ==
Jane, a musician who recently broke-up with her girlfriend and her band, decides to move from New York City to Los Angeles. She answers a newspaper ad for a co-driver to LA posted by Robin, a real estate agent who is also moving to California. Jane initially declines to join her on the road, but agrees after her car gets towed. Jane and Robin begin their journey, making a stop in Pittsburgh to see Jane's friend, Holly.

Jane and Robin witness a physical fight between Holly and her abusive boyfriend Nick about missing drugs. The three fight him when he assaults Holly in an argument over drugs. Holly hits Nick on the head with a bat to stop him from attacking Jane, knocking him unconscious. They restrain Nick to a chair with duct tape and turn on four hours of loud music to give themselves a head start to escape. Holly snaps a Polaroid of herself with Nick, tied and bound, before they leave.

Hours later, Nick frees himself but falls, hits his head and dies from his injuries. Robin sees a newspaper with the report of his death the next day, so they debate what to do. When Holly confesses she is also pregnant, and afraid of being arrested for murder, everyone decides to continue on to California together.

During a stop in Tucson, Arizona, Robin collapses at a local diner and is rushed to hospital for pneumonia. A doctor informs Jane and Holly that she has HIV, which has brought on the pneumonia. They decide to stay in Tucson and start new lives there.

Robin's health improves, Jane gets a job singing in a bar and Holly falls in love with a local police officer named Abe Lincoln. Robin, Holly and their new friends throw a surprise birthday party for Jane. Robin surprises her afterward with a new piano. Jane plays The Carpenters' “Superstar”, while Robin watches from the shadows. Robin realizes Jane is in love with her.

Their idyllic life is short-lived. Jane and Robin's friendship crumbles when Jane, with the best of intentions, tells a friendly bartender interested in Robin, that she has HIV. Feeling betrayed, Robin asks her to move out.

When Abe proposes to Holly, she confesses about Nick. Abe finds the photo Holly took and arrests her, despite his vow that he still intends to marry her.

Holly is returned to Pittsburgh to stand trial for murder. Jane and Robin follow her to Pittsburgh and make peace with each other in the courthouse. Holly accepts a plea bargain offer of involuntary manslaughter with one to two years in prison, with possibility of parole in a few months. Robin collapses after the trial from a lung infection, and in the hospital, Jane and Robin pledge love for each other.

Holly gives birth to a daughter named Mary Todd and finishes serving her sentence. She and Abe marry and return to the house in Tucson for a welcome home party. Holly is shocked at Robin's weakened state, due to her advanced stage of AIDS as she is in a wheelchair. At the party, Robin weakly tries to sing the Roy Orbison song "You Got It" to Jane, and Jane gently finishes the song.

In the final scene, Robin has died from AIDS, Holly and Abe plan to stay in Arizona to raise a family and Jane hits the road to seek a new life in Los Angeles.

== Cast ==
- Whoopi Goldberg as Jane DeLuca
- Mary-Louise Parker as Robin Nickerson
- Drew Barrymore as Holly Pulchik
- Matthew McConaughey as Abe Lincoln
- James Remar as Alex
- Billy Wirth as Nick
- Anita Gillette as Elaine Nickerson
- Dennis Boutsikaris as Massarelli, Prosecuting Attorney
- Estelle Parsons as Louise
- Amy Aquino as Anna

== Reception ==
Boys on the Side received a positive response from critics. On the review aggregator website Rotten Tomatoes, 73% of 113 critics' reviews are positive, with an average rating of 6.5/10. The website's consensus reads: "Pack your bags and leave them Boys on the Side to experience the kind of sisterhood that makes you laugh and cry through the bumpy, quirky road of life." The film was entered into the 19th Moscow International Film Festival.

Film critic Roger Ebert gave the film three-and-a-half stars, writing:

The reviews for Boys on the Side will mention Fried Green Tomatoes and Thelma and Louise, because it shares their assorted themes: female bonding, unexpressed love, women on the run. But this movie is not a collection of parts from other films. It's an original, and what it does best is show how strangers can become friends, and friends can become like family.

To get to know someone is very difficult, but if you really do, they should be able to tell you almost anything, and ask you almost anything, and that is where Boys on the Side is leading us.

=== Box office ===
The film grossed $23.4 million in the United States and Canada for a total of $47.4 million worldwide.

== Soundtrack ==
Boys on the Side

Soundtrack album by Various Artists
- Released: 1995
- Recorded: 1977–95
- Genre: Rock
- Length: 54:57
- Label: Arista

Professional ratings
Review scores
Source	Rating
AllMusic	3/5 stars

The film's soundtrack album consists entirely of contributions from female musicians, including Melissa Etheridge ("I Take You With Me"), Joan Armatrading ("Willow") and the Indigo Girls ("Power of Two"). Hit singles by Annie Lennox ("Why") and The Cranberries ("Dreams") also appear, as are new recordings by Sheryl Crow, Sarah McLachlan, Stevie Nicks, The Pretenders, and others. Bonnie Raitt's cover of the Roy Orbison hit "You Got It" peaked at #33 on the Billboard Hot 100 singles chart.

=== Track listing ===
1. Bonnie Raitt – "You Got It" (Jeff Lynne, Roy Orbison, Tom Petty) – 3:27
2. Melissa Etheridge – "I Take You with Me" (Etheridge) – 4:50
3. Sheryl Crow – "Keep On Growing" (Eric Clapton, Bobby Whitlock) – 5:27
4. Indigo Girls – "Power of Two" (Emily Saliers) – 5:23
5. Stevie Nicks – "Somebody Stand By Me" (Sheryl Crow, Todd Wolfe) – 5:06
6. Pretenders – "Everyday Is Like Sunday" (Morrissey, Stephen Street) – 3:42
7. The Cranberries – "Dreams" (Dolores O'Riordan, Noel Hogan) – 4:32
8. Annie Lennox – "Why" (Lennox) – 4:54
9. Sarah McLachlan – "Ol' '55" (Tom Waits) – 4:14
10. Joan Armatrading – "Willow" (Armatrading) – 4:04
11. Jonell Mosser – "Crossroads" (Robert Johnson) – 2:49
12. Whoopi Goldberg – "You Got It" (Lynne, Orbison, Petty) – 3:03
13. Bonnie Raitt – "You Got It" (Lynne, Orbison, Petty) – 3:26

There are several songs from the film that are not included on the official soundtrack album, such as Toni Childs' version of "Take Me To The River" and Boxing Gandhis' version of "Magic Carpet Ride".
