= In Dreams: The Greatest Hits =

Studio album by Roy Orbison
- Released: May 28, 1987
- Recorded: January 1986 – April 1987
- Studios: Record One, Sherman Oaks, CA
- Genres: Rockabilly, country, pop rock
- Length: 50:13
- Labels: Virgin, Sony Legacy (2013 re-release)
- Producers: T Bone Burnett, Roy Orbison, Michael Utley, David Lynch

Roy Orbison chronology
Class of '55 (1986)	In Dreams: The Greatest Hits (1987)	Mystery Girl (1989)

Alternative cover
- CD cover

In Dreams: The Greatest Hits is a two-record album set by Roy Orbison released in 1987 on Virgin Records. It was produced by Orbison and Mike Utley, except for the song "In Dreams", produced by Orbison with T-Bone Burnett and film director David Lynch. All songs are re-recordings by Orbison from 1986, except "In Dreams" from April 1987.

The original 1960s versions of these songs were hit records for Orbison when recorded on Monument Records from 1960 to 1964, with two exceptions. The first exception, "Ooby Dooby", was a hit for Orbison on Sun Records in 1956. "Claudette", the second exception, was a song Orbison wrote that became a hit for the Everly Brothers in 1958. Orbison did not record the latter exception until he had signed with MGM Records in 1965, a few months after he had divorced his wife Claudette, who had inspired the song. (They later reconciled and remarried in 1966, before her death in a motorcycle accident).

The album contains four songs named by Rolling Stone in 2004 on its list of the "500 Greatest Songs of All Time".

Professional ratings
Review scores
Source	Rating
AllMusic	link
Record Mirror	4/5 stars
Robert Christgau	(B) link
The Encyclopedia of Popular Music	2/5 stars
The Rolling Stone Album Guide	3/5 stars
MusicHound	3/5 stars

== History ==
In January 1986, Roy Orbison re-recorded 19 of his greatest hits as a gift to his fans. The master tapes of the original recordings were being legally held by Monument Records after the label went bankrupt in the late 1970s. Many of Orbison’s famous songs were not available to consumers for a few years and there was a threat to destroy the tapes if disputes were not resolved. Fearing his famous songs would be lost forever, Orbison stepped into the studio and performed them once again. According to The Authorized Roy Orbison, these recordings were first released on the Silver Eagle LP The Great Roy Orbison in 1986, and then given to Virgin Records, becoming Orbison's first release with his new label, In Dreams: The Greatest Hits, in 1987. The Virgin reissue featured a new version of the song "In Dreams" especially re-recorded following the success of the movie Blue Velvet.

Fortunately, all of Orbison's Monument master recordings were not destroyed, and like the rest of the Monument catalogue, they are presently owned by Sony Music Entertainment.

== Track listing ==
Side one
No.	Title	Writer(s)	Length
1.	"Only the Lonely"	Roy Orbison, Joe Melson	2:25
2.	"Leah"	Orbison	2:43
3.	"In Dreams"	Orbison	2:51
4.	"Uptown"	Orbison, Melson	2:11
5.	"It's Over"	Orbison, Bill Dees	2:49

Side two
No.	Title	Writer(s)	Length
6.	"Crying"	Orbison, Melson	2:46
7.	"Dream Baby"	Cindy Walker	2:35
8.	"Blue Angel"	Orbison, Melson	2:50
9.	"Working for the Man"	Orbison	2:49
10.	"Candy Man"	Beverly Ross, Fred Neil	2:50

Side three
No.	Title	Writer(s)	Length
11.	"Running Scared"	Orbison, Melson	2:11
12.	"Falling"	Orbison	2:22
13.	"I'm Hurtin'"	Orbison, Melson	2:43
14.	"Claudette"	Orbison	2:33

Side four
No.	Title	Writer(s)	Length
15.	"Oh, Pretty Woman"	Orbison, Dees	2:59
16.	"Mean Woman Blues"	Claude Demetrius	2:27
17.	"Ooby Dooby"	Wade Moore, Dick Penner	2:22
18.	"Lana"	Orbison, Melson	2:50
19.	"Blue Bayou"	Orbison, Melson	2:51

Executive Producer: Barbara Orbison

== Personnel ==
Adapted from AllMusic:

- Roy Orbison – lead vocals, acoustic rhythm guitar, lead guitar on "Ooby Dooby"
- Dean Parks – lead guitar
- Dennis Belfield – bass
- Robert Irving III – synthesizer
- Michael Utley – keyboards
- Paul Leim – drums
- Tommy Morgan – harmonica
- Sid Page – strings
- David Woodford – saxophone
- Joe Chemay, Rita Coolidge, Linda Dillard, Jim Haas, Jon Joyce, Gene Morford, Carole Parks – backing vocals
