= I'm Still in Love with You (Roy Orbison album) =

Studio album by Roy Orbison
- Released: September 15, 1975
- Genre: Country
- Length: 30:06
- Label: Mercury
- Producer: Jerry Kennedy

Roy Orbison chronology
Milestones (1973)	I'm Still in Love with You (1975)	Regeneration (1976)

I'm Still in Love with You is the nineteenth album by Roy Orbison, recorded for Mercury Records and according to the authorised biography of Roy Orbison, released in September 1975.

It features a mix of originals and covers of songs by Johnny Ace, and Buck Owens. it also features of new version of "Heartache" (which He previously recorded on Roy Orbison's Many Moods 6 years earlier in 1969).

== History ==
After an eight-year stint with MGM Records, he left MGM in 1973, and signed with Mercury a year later. This album had three singles. This album was only released in the United States.

== Reception ==
Professional ratings
Review scores
Source	Rating
AllMusic	3/5 stars
Rolling Stone	(Unfavorable)
The Encyclopedia of Popular Music	2/5 stars

William Ruhlmann of AllMusic thought "Their conception seems to have been to create a Roy Orbison album in the singer/songwriter's classic early-'60s style. For that, Kennedy has brought in outside songwriters Larry Gatlin ("Circle") and Bud Reneau ("All I Need Is Time") to contribute big, melodramatic ballads like the ones that gave Orbison big hits in his commercial heyday."

Billboard in its Top Country Album Picks reviews stated that the album "features a collection of lonely love songs in a new Orbison style."

Ellis Amburn described the album as "Disappointing"

== Track listing ==
Side one

1. "Pledging My Love" (Don Robey, Ferdinand "Fats" Washington)
2. "Spanish Nights" (Roy Orbison, Joe Melson)
3. "Rainbow Love" (Don Gibson)
4. "It's Lonely" (Orbison, Melson)
5. "Heartache" (Orbison, Bill Dees) – new lyrics

Side two

1. "Crying Time" (Buck Owens)
2. "Still" (Dorian Burton, Howard Plummer)
3. "Hung Up On You" (Orbison, Joe Melson)
4. "Circle" (Larry Gatlin)
5. "Sweet Mama Blue" (Orbison, Melson)
6. "All I Need Is Time" (George W. Reneau)

Produced by Jerry Kennedy Executive Producer: Roy Orbison Arranged by Bill Justis

== 2002 re-release ==
In 2002, the album was re-released in the UK in CD format by Spectrum Music with a different track order.

1. "Pledging My Love"
2. "Rainbow Love"
3. "Heartache"
4. "Still"
5. "Circle"
6. "All I Need Is Time"
7. "Spanish Nights"
8. "It's Lonely"
9. "Crying Time"
10. "Hung Up On You"
11. "Sweet Mama Blue"
