= Regeneration (Roy Orbison album) =

Studio album by Roy Orbison
- Released: 1976
- Studios: Monument, Nashville, Tennessee
- Genre: Rock
- Length: 26:42
- Label: Monument
- Producer: Fred Foster

Roy Orbison chronology
I'm Still in Love with You (1976)	Regeneration (1976)	Laminar Flow (1979)

Singles from Regeneration
- 1. "Belinda" Released: March 1976; 2. "(I'm A) Southern Man" Released: October 1976; 3. "Under Suspicion" Released: April 1977

Regeneration is an album by the American musician Roy Orbison, released in November 1976. It marked his return to Monument Records, where he had launched his greatest successes more than fifteen years earlier. It was produced by Fred Foster.

== Critical reception ==
Professional ratings
Review scores
Source	Rating
AllMusic	2/5 stars
The Encyclopedia of Popular Music	2/5 stars
Record Mirror	3/5 stars

Cashbox said the album "features a sound similar to the one that made [Orbison] a legend" with his "unique style" being "well utilized on the ballads like 'Born to Love Me' and 'Old Love Song'."

Jim Evans of Record Mirror harps on the reunion between Orbison and producer Fred Foster. Noting that Orbison's "distinctive voice is still there, sensitive without being sentimental", the "album starts to rekindle the old magic" and "almost gets there."

== Track listing ==
Side one

1. "I'm a Southern Man" (Tony Joe White)
2. "No Chain at All" (Bob Morrison)
3. "Old Love Song" (Bob Morrison, Alice Kiester)
4. "Can't Wait" (Alan Rush, Dennis Linde)
5. "Born to Love Me" (Bob Morrison)

Side two

1. "Blues in My Mind" (Fred Rose)
2. "Something They Can't Take Away" (Kris Kristofferson)
3. "Under Suspicion" (Alan Rush, Dennis Linde)
4. "I Don't Really Want You" (Dennis Linde)
5. "Belinda" (Dennis Linde)

== Personnel ==
- Roy Orbison – vocals
- Grady Martin, John Christopher, Reggie Young, Steve Gibson – guitar
- Tommy Cogbill – bass guitar
- Bobby Emmons, Bobby Wood, Shane Keister – keyboards
- Gene Chrisman, Jerry Carrigan – drums
- Farrell Morris – percussion
- Charles Rose, Harrison Calloway, Harvey Thompson, Billy Puett, Dennis Good, George Tidwell – horns
- Bergen White, Buzz Cason, Dennis Linde, Diane Tidwell, Ginger Holladay, Janie Fricke, Laverna Moore, Lisa Silver, Sheri Kramer, The Cherry Sisters, Tom Brannon – backing vocals
- Brenton Banks, Byron Bach, Carl Gorodetzky, Christian Teal, Gary Vanosdale, George Binkley, Lennie Haight, Martha McCrory, Martin Katahn, Marvin Chantry, Pam Sixfin, Roy Christensen, Sheldon Kurland, Stephanie Woolf, Steven Smith, Virginia Christensen – strings

Tracks 3, 5, 6, 8 Arranged by Bill Justis
Tracks 4, 6, 10 Arranged by Bergen White
