= You Got It =

1989 single by Roy Orbison

Single by Roy Orbison

from the album Mystery Girl
- B-side: "The Only One"
- Released: January 3, 1989
- Recorded: April 1988
- Studio: Mike Campbell's garage (Los Angeles)
- Genre: Rock
- Length: 3:30
- Label: Virgin
- Songwriters: Jeff Lynne; Roy Orbison; Tom Petty
- Producer: Jeff Lynne

Roy Orbison singles chronology
"Crying" (1987)	"You Got It" (1989)	"She's a Mystery to Me" (1989)

Music video
- "You Got It" on YouTube

"You Got It" is a song from American singer Roy Orbison's 22nd studio album, Mystery Girl (1989). The song was released posthumously on January 3, 1989, after Orbison's death from a heart attack on December 6, 1988. The song was issued with "The Only One" as the B-side and was later released with "Crying" (version with k.d. lang). The single reached number nine on the US Billboard Hot 100 and number one on the Adult Contemporary chart, returning Orbison to the top 10 for the first time in 25 years. "You Got It" also reached number three on the UK Singles Chart and entered the top five in 10 other countries. Although it is an Orbison solo single, Orbison's fellow Traveling Wilburys bandmates Tom Petty and Jeff Lynne co-wrote the song and played instruments on the record.

According to The Authorized Roy Orbison, the song was recorded at guitarist Mike Campbell's garage in Los Angeles, California, and mixed at George Harrison's residence Friar Park in Henley-on-Thames, England. Orbison gave his only public rendition of the hit (a mimed performance) at the Diamond Awards Festival in Antwerp, Belgium, on November 19, 1988, just 17 days before his death and before the single was released. This footage was incorporated into the song's music video. A 2014 version incorporated videos of rehearsal and practice sessions.

== Background ==
"You Got It" was written by Orbison and his Traveling Wilburys bandmates Jeff Lynne and Tom Petty, their first songwriting collaboration. It was written during the Christmas season of 1987 and recorded in Mike Campbell's garage in Los Angeles, California, in April 1988. Lynne, Petty, former Beatle and fellow Wilbury George Harrison and Phil Jones provided other instrumentation and background vocals. Harrison went uncredited on the track.

Cash Box said that it "showcases Orbison’s distinctive vocal charge—fluid, yet capable of creating excitement" and said "listen for the exotically melodic lift to the chorus".

== Personnel ==
- Roy Orbison – lead vocals and backing vocals, acoustic guitar
- Jeff Lynne – electric guitar, bass, synthesizer, piano and backing vocals
- Tom Petty – acoustic guitar and backing vocals
- George Harrison – acoustic guitar and backing vocals (uncredited)
- Phil Jones – drums and timpani
- Michael Utley – string arrangement

== Charts ==
=== Weekly charts ===
Chart (1989)	Peak position
Australia (ARIA)	3
Austria (Ö3 Austria Top 40)	4
Belgium (Ultratop 50 Flanders)	1
Canada Retail Singles (The Record)	1
Canada Top Singles (RPM)	3
Canada Country Singles (RPM)	3
Europe (Eurochart Hot 100)	3
Finland (Suomen virallinen lista)	3
France (IFOP)	35
Ireland (IRMA)	2
Italy Airplay (Music & Media)	9
Netherlands (Dutch Top 40)	3
Netherlands (Single Top 100)	4
New Zealand (Recorded Music NZ)	2
Norway (VG-lista)	3
Sweden (Sverigetopplistan)	5
Switzerland (Schweizer Hitparade)	9
UK Singles (Official Charts)	3
US Billboard Hot 100	9
US Adult Contemporary (Billboard)	1
US Hot Country Songs (Billboard)	7
US Mainstream Rock (Billboard)	2
West Germany (GfK)	9

=== Year-end charts ===
Chart (1989)	Position
Australia (ARIA)	23
Austria (Ö3 Austria Top 40)	22
Belgium (Ultratop)	10
Canada Top Singles (RPM)	33
Canada Country Tracks (RPM)	39
Europe (Eurochart Hot 100)	50
Netherlands (Dutch Top 40)	29
Netherlands (Single Top 100)	31
UK Singles (OCC)	33
US Adult Contemporary (Billboard)	10
US Album Rock Tracks (Billboard)	31
US Hot Country Songs (Billboard)	95
West Germany (Media Control)	45

== Certifications ==
Region	Certification	Certified units/sales
Australia (ARIA)	Gold	35,000^{^}
Canada (Music Canada)	Gold	50,000^{^}
New Zealand (RMNZ)	Platinum	30,000^{‡}
Spain (Promusicae)	Gold	30,000^{‡}
Sweden (GLF)	Gold	25,000^{^}
United Kingdom (BPI)	Gold	400,000^{‡}
^{^} Shipments figures based on certification alone.^{‡} Sales+streaming figures based on certification alone.

== Bonnie Raitt version ==
"You Got It"

Single by Bonnie Raitt

from the album Boys on the Side: Original Soundtrack Album
- Released: February 1995
- Genre: Country pop
- Length: 3:27
- Label: Arista
- Songwriters: Jeff Lynne; Roy Orbison; Tom Petty
- Producers: Don Was; Bonnie Raitt

Bonnie Raitt singles chronology
"Storm Warning" (1994)	"You Got It" (1995)	"Rock Steady" (1995)

The song became a hit again in 1995 for American singer-songwriter Bonnie Raitt, who recorded a version for the soundtrack of the film Boys on the Side. In the United States, it peaked at number 33 on the Billboard Hot 100 and spent two weeks at number 31 on the Cash Box Top 100. In Canada, "You Got It" reached number 11 and was the 62nd-biggest hit of 1995, while in Iceland, it peaked at number 10. "You Got It" was nominated for the Grammy Award for Best Female Pop Vocal Performance, becoming Raitt's fifth nomination in the category.

=== Charts ===
==== Weekly charts ====
Chart (1995)	Peak position
Canada Top Singles (RPM)	11
Canada Adult Contemporary (RPM)	3
Iceland (Íslenski Listinn Topp 40)	10
US Billboard Hot 100	33
US Adult Contemporary (Billboard)	6
US Cash Box Top 100	31

==== Year-end charts ====
Chart (1995)	Position
Canada Top Singles (RPM)	62
Canada Adult Contemporary (RPM)	34
US Adult Contemporary (Billboard)	31
