= Roy Orbison =

American singer-songwriter (1936–1988)

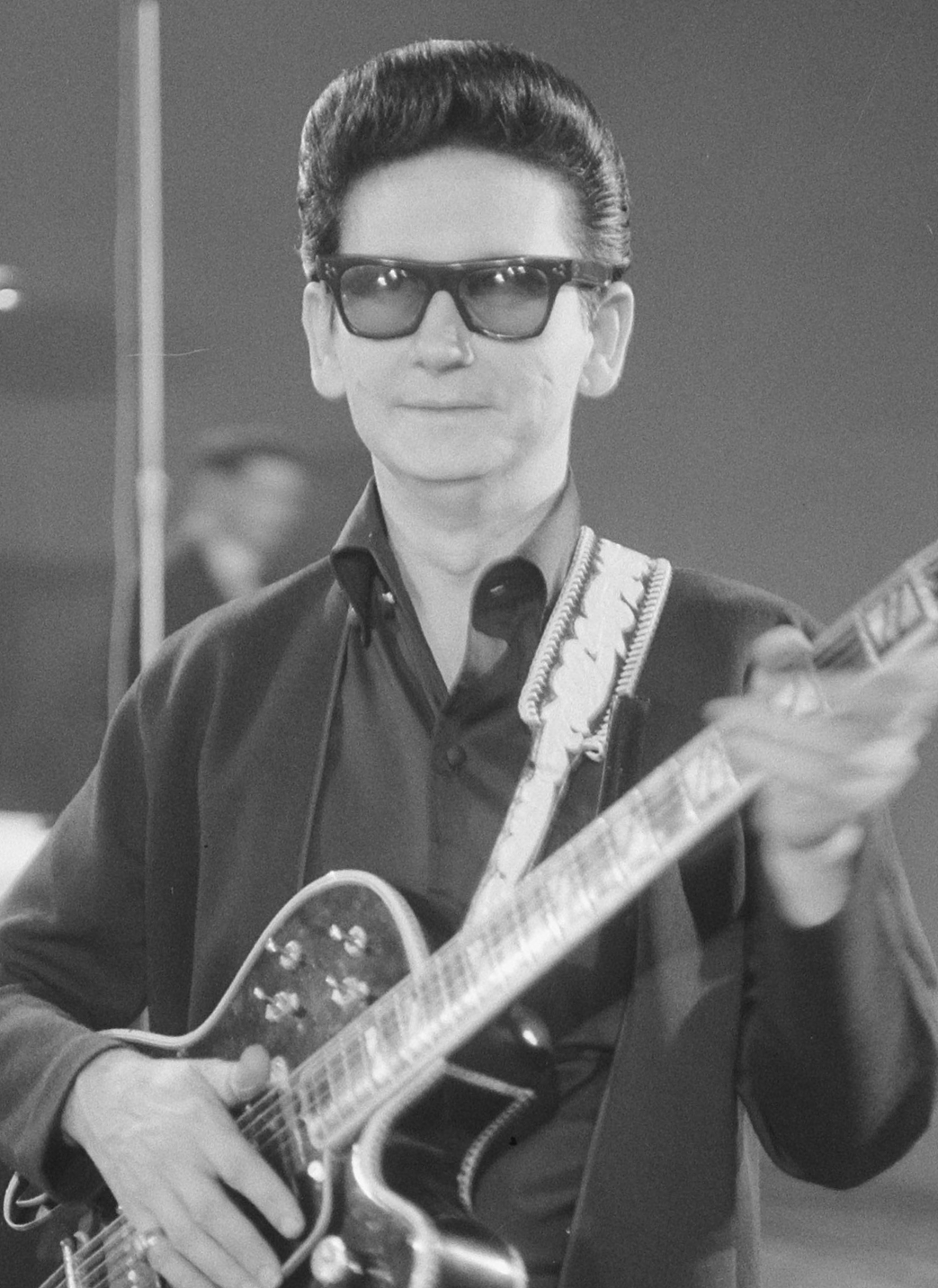
- Orbison in 1965
- Born: Roy Kelton Orbison; April 23, 1936; Vernon, Texas, U.S.
- Died: December 6, 1988 (aged 52); Hendersonville, Tennessee, U.S.
- Occupations: Singer-songwriter; musician
- Spouses: Claudette Frady (m. 1957; div. 1964) (m. 1965; died 1966) Barbara Jakobs (m. 1969)
- Children: 5, including Alex
- Musical career
- Genres: Rock; pop; country; rock and roll; rockabilly
- Instruments: Vocals; guitar
- Works: Roy Orbison discography
- Years active: 1953–1988
- Labels: Sun; RCA Victor; Monument; London; MGM; Mercury/PolyGram; Asylum; Virgin
- Formerly of: Wink Westerners; Teen Kings; Traveling Wilburys
- Website: royorbison.com

Roy Kelton Orbison (April 23, 1936 – December 6, 1988) was an American singer, songwriter and guitarist known for his distinctive and powerful voice, complex song structures, and dark, emotional ballads. Orbison's most successful periods were in the early 1960s and the late 1980s. Many of Orbison's songs conveyed vulnerability at a time when most male performers projected strength. He performed with minimal motion and in black clothes, matching his dyed black hair and dark sunglasses.

Born in Texas, Orbison began singing in a country-and-western band as a teenager. He was signed by Sam Phillips of Sun Records in 1956 after being urged by Johnny Cash. Elvis Presley was leaving Sun and Phillips was looking to replace him. His first Sun recording, "Ooby Dooby", was musically akin of Presley's early Sun recordings. He had moderate success at Sun, but enjoyed his greatest success with Monument Records. From 1960 to 1966, 22 of Orbison's singles reached the Billboard top 40. His top-10 hits, many of which he either wrote or co-wrote, include "Only the Lonely" (1960), "Running Scared" (1961), "Crying" (1961), "In Dreams" (1963), "Oh, Pretty Woman" (1964), "I Drove All Night" (1987), "She's a Mystery to Me" (1988), "You Got It" (1988), and "California Blue" (1988).

After the mid-1960s, Orbison suffered a number of personal tragedies and his career faltered. He experienced a resurgence in popularity in the late 1980s following the success of several cover versions of his songs. In 1988, he co-founded the Traveling Wilburys supergroup with George Harrison, Bob Dylan, Tom Petty and Jeff Lynne. Orbison died of a heart attack that December at age 52. One month later, his song "You Got It" (1989) was released as a solo single, becoming his first hit to reach the top 10 in both the US and UK in nearly 25 years.

Orbison's honors include inductions into the Rock and Roll Hall of Fame and Nashville Songwriters Hall of Fame in 1987, the Songwriters Hall of Fame in 1989 and the Musicians Hall of Fame and Museum in 2014. He received a Grammy Lifetime Achievement Award and five other Grammy Awards. Rolling Stone placed him at number 37 on its list of the "Greatest Artists of All Time" and number 13 on its list of the "100 Greatest Singers of All Time". In 2002, Billboard magazine listed him at number 74 on its list of the Top 600 recording artists.

== Early life ==
Roy Kelton Orbison was born on April 23, 1936, in Vernon, Texas. He was the second of three sons born to Orbie Lee Orbison (1913–1984) and Nadine Vesta Shults (1914–1992). His father was an oil-field driller who struggled to find work after the Great Depression, and his mother enjoyed painting and writing poetry. His direct paternal ancestry was traced to Thomas Orbison (born 1715) from Lurgan, Ireland who settled in the Province of Pennsylvania in the mid-18th century. According to The Authorized Roy Orbison, a biography written by Orbison's son Alex, the family moved to Fort Worth in 1942 to find work in the aircraft factories. Because of eyesight problems, Orbison wore thick glasses from the age of four.

Orbison's father gave him a guitar on his sixth birthday, and he was taught how to play it by his father and older brother. He recalled, "I was finished, you know, for anything else" by the time he was seven, and music became the focus of his life. His major musical influence as a youth was country and western swing music. He was particularly moved by Lefty Frizzell's singing, with its slurred syllables, leading Orbison to adopt the stage name "Lefty Wilbury" during his time with the Traveling Wilburys. He also enjoyed Hank Williams, Bob Wills, Moon Mullican, and Jimmie Rodgers. One of the first musicians he heard in person was Ernest Tubb, playing on the back of a truck in Fort Worth. Orbison also said that a formative experience was the regular singing sessions at Fort Worth, where he was surrounded by soldiers who were intensely emotional because they were about to be sent to the front line in World War II. In West Texas, he was exposed to rhythm and blues, western swing, Tex-Mex (Tejano music), the orchestral arrangements of Mantovani, and Cajun music. The Cajun favorite "Jole Blon" was one of the first songs he sang in public. He attended Denver Avenue Elementary School in Fort Worth until a polio scare in 1944 prompted his parents to send Orbison (then eight) and his brother Grady Lee to Vernon to live with their grandmother. He began singing on a local radio show at age eight, and he became the show's host by the late 1940s. At the age of nine, Orbison won a contest on radio station KVWC, which led to his own radio show, on which he sang the same songs every week. As World War II wound down, Roy's parents returned to Vernon.

The Orbison family moved again in 1946, to Wink, Texas, in search of employment. Orbison described life in Wink as "football, oil fields, oil, grease, and sand" and expressed relief that he was able to leave the desolate town. (Note: Ellis Amburn argues that Orbison was bullied and ostracized in Wink and that he gave conflicting reports to Texas newspapers, claiming that it was still home to him while simultaneously maligning the town to Rolling Stone.) He was self-conscious about his appearance and began dyeing his nearly white hair black when he was still young. He was quiet, self-effacing, polite, and obliging. During recess at school, he played guitar by himself while the other kids played physical games. As a teenager, Orbison's lack of sporting ability left him with shyness and low self-esteem. He was always keen to sing, however, and considered his voice memorable but not great.

== Career ==
=== 1949–1955: Wink Westerners ===
In 1949, Orbison (then 13 years old) formed the band "Wink Westerners" with school friends Billy Pat Ellis on drums, Slob Evans on bass fiddle, Richard West on piano, and James Morrow on electric mandolin. They played country and western swing standards and Glenn Miller jazz swing songs at local honky-tonk bars, and had a weekly morning radio show on KERB in Kermit, Texas. Their first performance was at a school assembly in 1953. They were offered $400 to play at a dance, and Orbison realized that he could make a living in music. Orbison was also part of a marching band and a singing octet. At the age of 15, he decided that instead of becoming a guitar player, he would use the guitar as an accompaniment to his singing.

In 1953, the Wink Westerners entered a talent contest on KMID-TV in Midland, Texas. The group won the contest, resulting in a 30-minute spot on a local television show. After the show, Orbison asked the owner of the company sponsoring the show if he could sponsor the group for ongoing shows, which led to the Wink Westerners playing weekly shows on KMID-TV on Friday nights and on Odessa television station KOSA-TV on Saturday nights. Around this time, Orbison began dyeing his hair (naturally a "dishwater grey color") to jet black.

After graduating from high school in 1954, Orbison enrolled at North Texas State College in Denton. His plan was to study geology so he could secure work in the oil fields if music did not pay; however, he became bored with the course in its first year, and switched to history and English. Orbison preferred to play music with fellow students Billy Pat Ellis, Dick Penner, and Wade Moore. Penner and Moore had written a simple, catchy rockabilly song, "Ooby Dooby", which impressed Orbison, and he started looking into how he could make a recording of it. Orbison continued performing with the Wink Westerners after his first year. He then heard that his schoolmate Pat Boone had signed a record deal, and it further strengthened his resolve to become a professional musician. At a New Year's Eve dance in 1954, the Wink Westerners had mostly played country and western swing music throughout the night, but ended the night by playing Bill Haley & the Comets’ hit song "Shake, Rattle and Roll" repeatedly, which became the catalyst for the band switching to rock and roll music. Also, Orbison had seen Elvis Presley perform back during his days at North Texas State College in 1954, and was impressed by the shocking gyrations that Elvis exhibited on stage. (Note: Orbison later said that he "couldn't overemphasize how shocking" Presley looked and seemed to him that night.)

=== 1955–1956: The Teen Kings ===
At the end of the spring semester of 1955, Orbison dropped out of North Texas State College, switching to Odessa Junior College. The Wink Westerners were disbanded in the fall of 1955, and Orbison formed a new band called the Teen Kings. The band was made of Orbison, Billy Pat Ellis, and James Morrow from the Wink Westerners, plus Jack Kennelly on bass and Johnny Wilson. At a dance event where the Teen Kings performed, Orbison met his future wife, Claudette Frady. Frady was 14 at the time, five years younger than Orbison.

The Teen Kings's first recording was the song "Ooby Dooby", which was recorded at Norman Petty's studio in Clovis, New Mexico, in March 1956. It was published by Odessa-based start-up label Je–Wel as the B-side of the JE-WEL 101 single. The A-side of the single was "Tryin' to Get to You", a song previously recorded by Elvis Presley.

After "Ooby Dooby" was published by Je-Wel Records, Orbison became convinced that a larger record company would be able to sell more copies of the record, and he spoke to a lawyer about breaking the contract with Je-Wel. Initially, Orbison obtained an injunction to prevent Je-Wel from distributing the record, before they reached an agreement that the band would pay back the label the costs of producing the records. He was now free to find a new label to market Ooby Dooby, but a further setback was that he cut a demonstration tape of the song for Columbia Records, which they turned down, but had one of their contract artists (Sid King) release a recording of "Ooby Dooby" before Orbison could offer the tape to another record company.

Eventually, Sam Phillips's Sun Records signed up to record "Ooby Dooby", but the events which led to this are disputed. Some claim that Johnny Cash toured the Odessa area in 1955 and 1956, appearing on the same local TV show as the Wink Westerners, Cash said, "[I]n late '55 or early '56, I was touring with Elvis when I met Roy in Texas... I told him to get in touch with Sun Records if he wanted to be a recording artist". Orbison has said that when he did this, Phillips told him, "Johnny Cash doesn't run my record company!". However, both Sam Philips and Billy Pat Ellis (the band's drummer) have disputed that Johnny Cash was involved. Three of the Teen Kings's band members have said that their relationship with Sun Records began when Odessa record-store owner Poppa Holifield played it over the telephone for Sam Phillips in April 1956, and Phillips offered the Teen Kings a contract.

The Teen Kings went to Sun Studio in Memphis, to re-record "Ooby Dooby" for publication by Sun Records. After an audition of the song, Sam Phillips signed the band up for "a year or two". However, the band's career soon slumped, since Orbison wanted to record emotional ballads rather than the rockabilly songs demanded by Sam Phillips, and Phillips's goal for a successor to Elvis Presley had moved on from Orbison to Carl Perkins. The Teen Kings were granted a reprieve when Carl Perkins was badly injured in a car crash, resulting in "Ooby Dooby" being released (along with "Go Go Go") as Sun Single 242 in May 1956. The Teen Kings began an experimental tour of drive-in theaters in the Southern U.S. states (playing on top of projection house roofs between drive-in film showings) with Sonny James, Johnny Horton, Carl Perkins, and Johnny Cash. Much influenced by Elvis Presley, Orbison performed frenetically, doing "everything we could to get applause, because we had only one hit record". Orbison also began writing songs in a rockabilly style, including "Go! Go! Go!" and "Rockhouse". In June 1956, "Ooby Dooby" peaked at number 59 in the Billboard charts and sold 200,000 copies, but the follow-up singles did not reach the charts.

The Teen Kings played alongside Carl Perkins, Johnny Cash, Warren Smith, and Eddie Bond at the Overton Park Shell on June 1, 1956, but Orbison's relationship with the rest of the band was deteriorating at this stage. Elvis Presley was in the audience for this show, and Orbison claimed that Elvis praised Orbison, but another band member says that it was actually Jack Kennelly (the band's bass player) whom Presley praised. Kennelly said, "Roy's dream was to be a star, and once Sam (Phillips) inflated his ego, he couldn't be a part of a unit. Roy became egomaniacal". In the summer of 1956, Orbison purchased a brand-new purple Cadillac and a diamond ring with his first royalty check from "Ooby Dooby"; however, the band soon found out that their paychecks from the concerts were not covering their costs and that life as a touring band was a demoralizing experience. The band's contract did not include any royalty payments ("BMI") when their songs were played on the radio, and Orbison had run out of money by late 1956. Orbison was encouraged by Norman Petty to record a single without the Teen Kings and the rest of the band walked on Roy during a recording session when told of a plan to rename the band "Roy Orbison and the Teen Kings". The band broke up in December 1956, and Sam Phillips said they were arguing about money, but the basic problem was that Orbison was too much of a loner and driven egoist. The lack of a band was a serious problem for Orbison's contract at Sun Records, since the label had no use for a singer who did not have a band.

=== 1956–1959: Solo work and Acuff-Rose Music ===
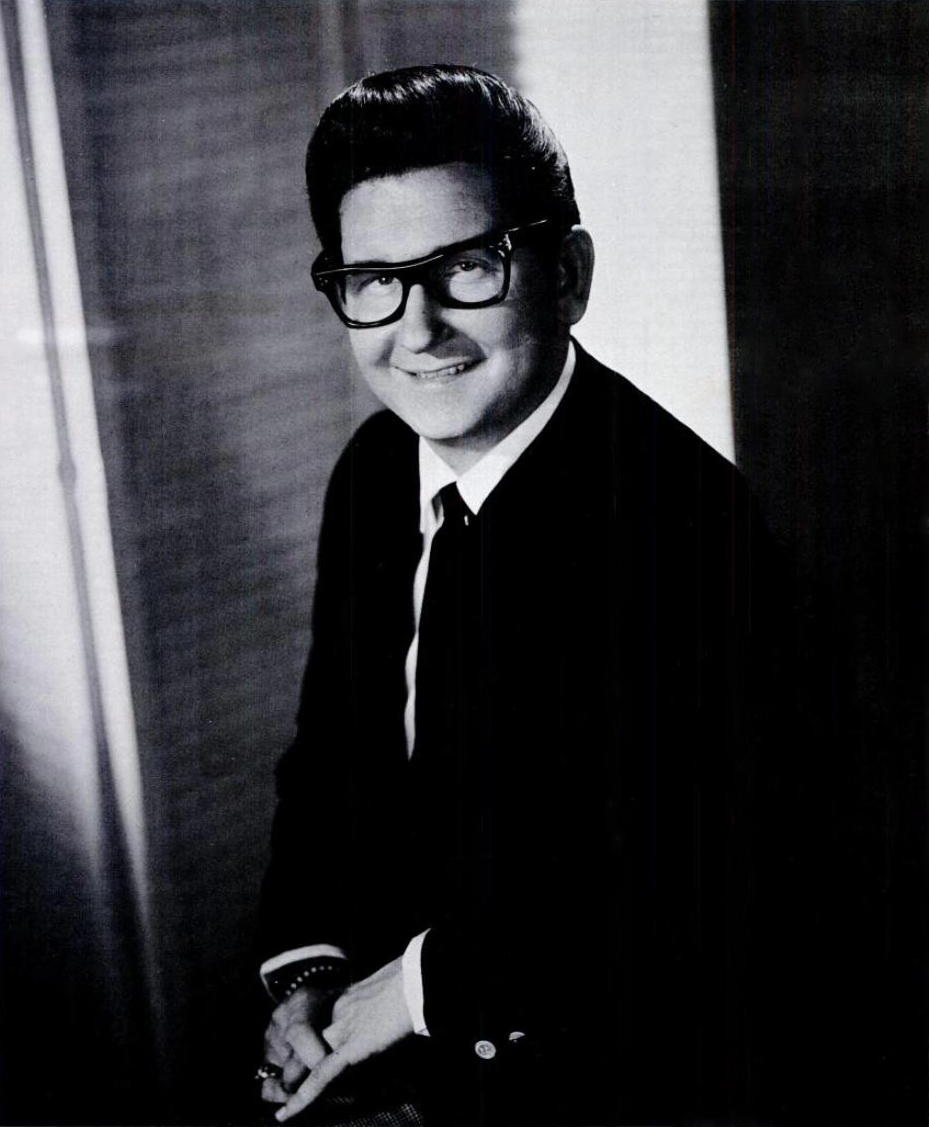
Orbison in 1965, wearing thick-rimmed glasses

After the Teen Kings split, Orbison stayed in Memphis with his girlfriend Claudette. (Note: Alan Clayson's biography refers to her as Claudette Hestand.) However, Orbison was broke, and realized that he could not survive as a recording artist, so after several weeks, he returned to the road. He toured with Johnny Cash, Sonny Burgess, Eddie Cochran, and Gene Vincent, playing mostly songs from other artists before finishing the set with a song of his own. At the time, Orbison was addicted to sleeping pills and speed. Orbison was introduced to Elvis Presley's social circle, and at some stage picked up a date for Presley in his purple Cadillac.

In August 1957, Orbison returned to the Sun Recording Studio and recorded several new songs with just his acoustic guitar instead of a backing band. None was successful, though, and Roy gave up on becoming a recording artist. Sam Phillips remembered being much more impressed with Orbison's mastery of the guitar than with his voice. Orbison returned to Odessa, Texas, in the fall of 1957 to be together with his 16-year-old girlfriend, Claudette. The two began to talk about getting married. On a professional level, Orbison met singer Joe Melson while in Memphis, who would collaborate with Orbison on his biggest hit songs in the early 1960s.

A ballad Orbison wrote, "The Clown", met with a lukewarm response; after hearing it, Sun Records producer Jack Clement told Orbison that he would never make it as a ballad singer. Nonetheless, he continued to pitch his ballad "Claudette" (on which he began working in early 1956) to singers he met on tour, and in April 1958, the Everly Brothers recorded it as the B-side of their hit "All I Have to Do Is Dream". "Claudette" reached number 30 in the charts in March 1959. Orbison then left Sun Records, due to a dispute about royalties from "Claudette" (which was recorded by Nashville Records). Orbison and Claudette had married in 1957, and their first child was born on September 16, 1958. Using the royalty payments from the Everly Brothers hit "Claudette", Orbison bought the most expensive new pink Cadillac available. However, Roy and Claudette spent the money lavishly and were soon broke and living with Roy's parents in Wink.

Increasingly frustrated at Sun, he gradually stopped recording. He toured music circuits around Texas, and then quit performing for seven months in 1958.

During the period of 1958–1959, Orbison made his living at Acuff-Rose Music, a songwriting firm concentrating mainly on country music. After spending an entire day writing a song, he would make several demonstration tapes at a time and send them to Wesley Rose, who would try to find musical acts to record them. Orbison then worked with, and was in awe of, Chet Atkins (who had played guitar with Presley) and attempted to sell his recordings of songs by other writers to the RCA Victor record label. One of these songs was "Seems to Me", by Boudleaux Bryant. Bryant's impression of Orbison was of "a timid, shy kid who seemed to be rather befuddled by the whole music scene. I remember the way he sang then—softly, prettily, but almost bashfully, as if someone might be disturbed by his efforts and reprimand him."

Playing shows at night and living with his wife and young child in a tiny apartment, Orbison often took his guitar to his car to write songs. Songwriter Joe Melson, an acquaintance of Orbison's, tapped on his car window one day in Texas in 1958, and the two decided to write some songs together. In three recording sessions in 1958 and 1959, Orbison recorded seven songs for RCA Victor at their Nashville studios; only two singles ("Paper Boy" and "With the Bug") were judged worthy of release by the label. Wesley Rose brought Orbison to the attention of the producer Fred Foster at Monument Records, the record label to which Orbison would soon switch.

=== 1960–1964: Monument Records and stardom ===
==== Early singles ====
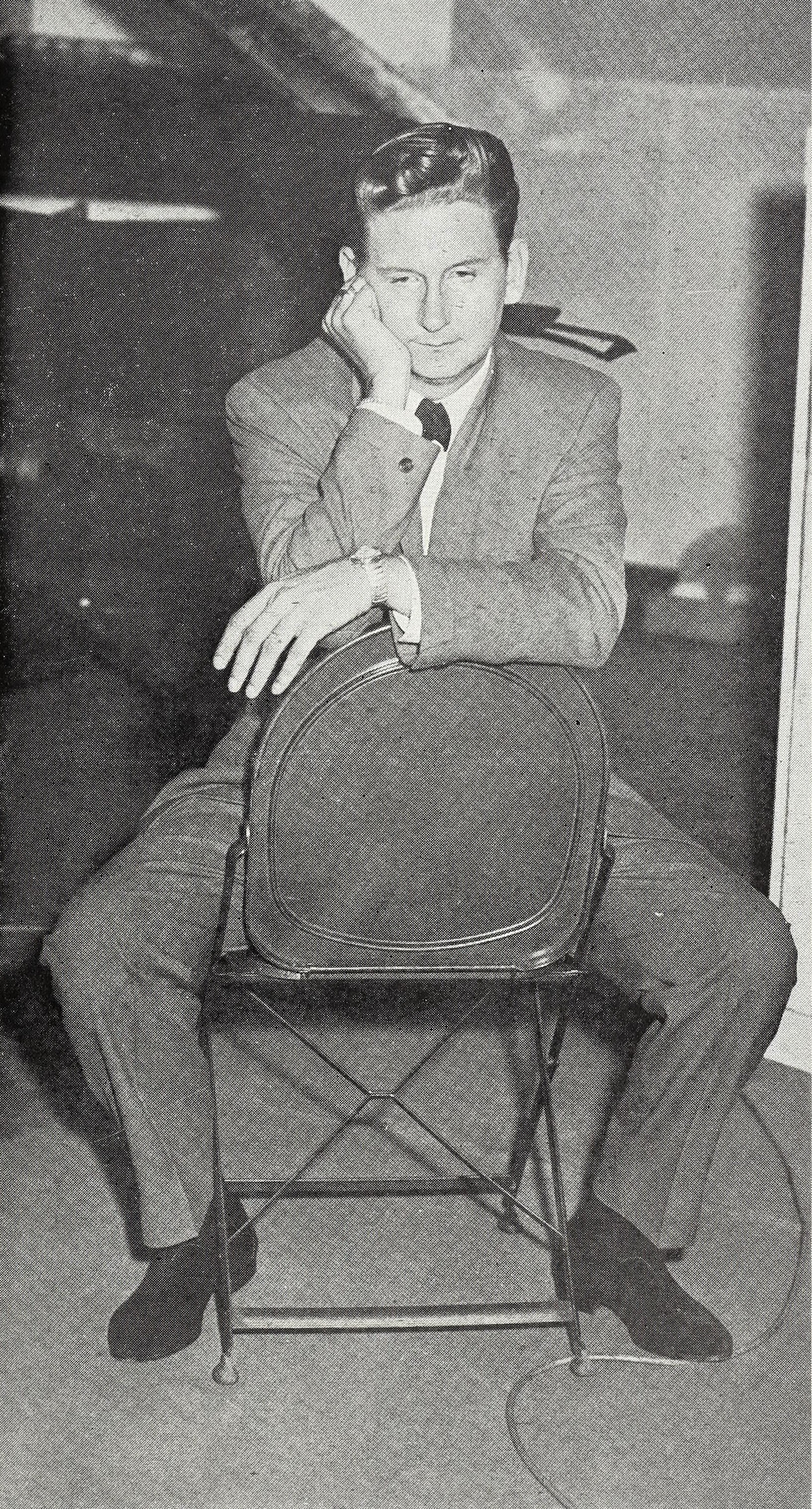
Orbison on the cover of Cashbox, September 3, 1960

In his first session for Monument in Nashville, Orbison recorded a song that RCA Victor had refused, "Paper Boy". It was accompanied by the B-side sing "With the Bug", but neither song charted.

Orbison's own style, the sound created at RCA Victor Studio B in Nashville with pioneer engineer Bill Porter, the production by Foster, and the accompanying musicians gave Orbison's music a "polished, professional sound... finally allowing Orbison's stylistic inclinations free rein". Orbison requested to use string instruments instead of fiddles, which was unusual for the time. He recorded three new songs, the most notable of which was "Uptown", written with Joe Melson and released in late 1959. Impressed with the results, Melson later recalled, "We stood in the studio, listening to the playbacks, and thought it was the most beautiful sound in the world." The Rolling Stone Illustrated History of Rock and Roll states that the music Orbison made in Nashville "brought a new splendour to rock", and compared the melodramatic effects of the orchestral accompaniment to the musical productions of Phil Spector.

"Uptown" was a modest hit and the first song by Orbison and Melson to reach the Billboard Top 100. His initial success came just as the 1950s rock-and-roll era was winding down. Starting in 1960, the charts in the United States came to be dominated by teen idols, novelty acts, and Motown girl groups.

==== "Only the Lonely" ====
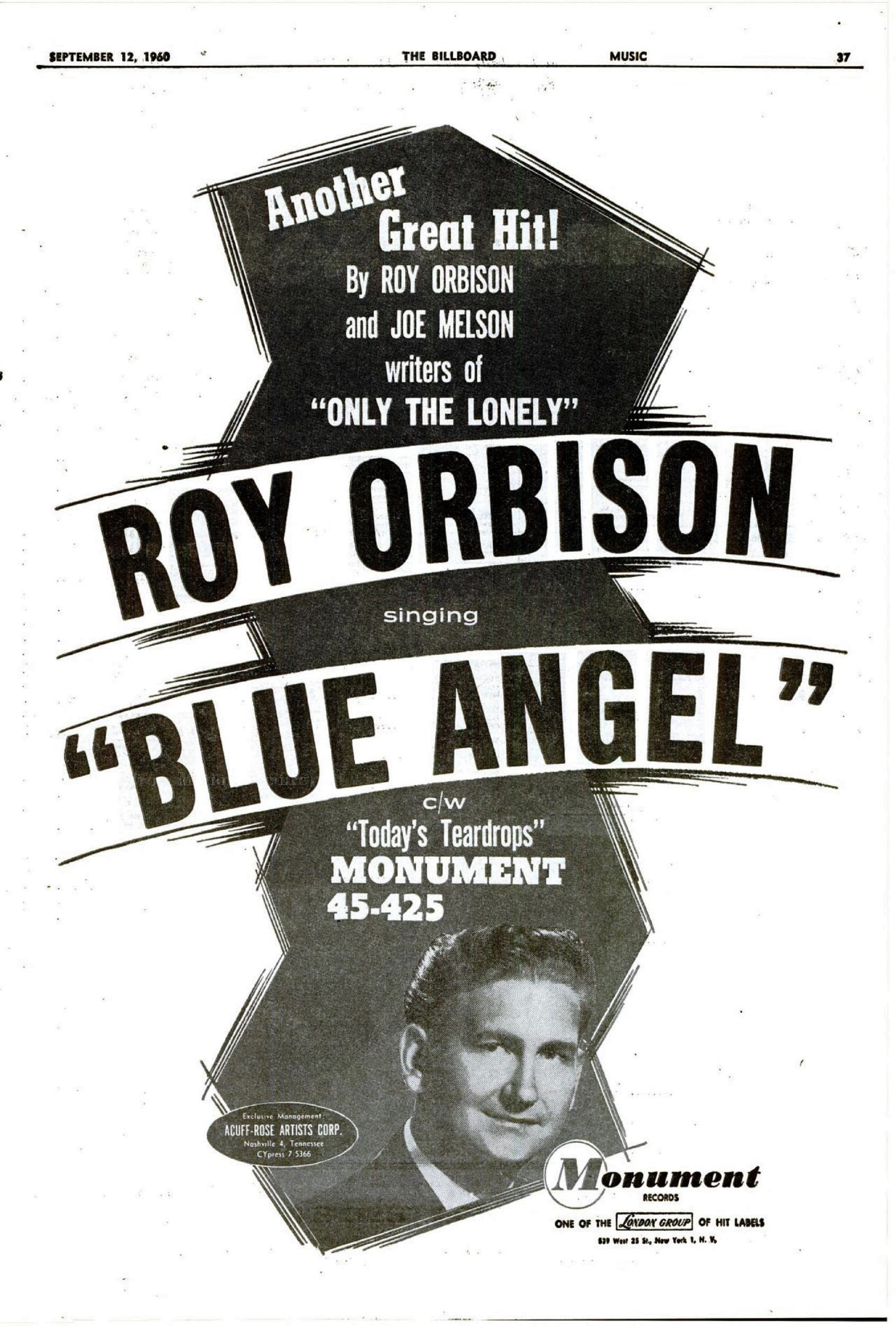
Billboard advertisement, September 12, 1960

Experimenting with a new sound, Orbison and Joe Melson wrote a song in early 1960, which in using elements from "Uptown" and another song they had written called "Come Back to Me (My Love)", employed strings and the Anita Kerr doo-wop backing singers. It also featured a note hit by Orbison in falsetto that showcased a powerful voice, which according to biographer Clayson, "came not from his throat, but deeper within". The song was "Only the Lonely (Know the Way I Feel)". Orbison was passing through Memphis when he tried to pitch the song to Elvis Presley (along with several other songs) to make some money quickly, but it was early in the morning and Presley did not want to see Orbison at that time. Orbison and Melson instead recorded the song at RCA Victor's Nashville studio, with sound engineer Bill Porter trying a completely new strategy, building the mix from the top down rather than from the bottom up, beginning with close-microphoned backing vocals in the foreground, and ending with the rhythm section soft in the background. This combination became Orbison's trademark sound.

"Only the Lonely" shot to number two on the Billboard Hot 100 and hit number one in the UK and Australia. According to Orbison, the subsequent songs he wrote with Melson during this period were constructed with his voice in mind, specifically to showcase its range and power. He told Rolling Stone in 1988, "I liked the sound of [my voice]. I liked making it sing, making the voice ring, and I just kept doing it. And I think that somewhere between the time of "Ooby Dooby" and "Only the Lonely", it kind of turned into a good voice." At the time of its recording, though, Orbison was struggling to earn a living, because he was only working as a singer at local dances. Also, the days of his working with Melson were numbered, due to disagreements such as who came up with the title for "Only the Lonely". The success of "Only the Lonely" transformed Orbison into an overnight star, and he appeared on Dick Clark's Saturday Night Beechnut Show in New York City. When Presley heard "Only the Lonely" for the first time, he bought a box of copies to pass to his friends.

==== Move to Nashville ====
"Running Scared" (1961)
The ending of "Running Scared" features Orbison's natural voice hitting high A natural.

Soon after recording an early version of his next hit "Blue Angel", Orbison and his wife and son (Roy DeWayne, born in 1958) moved from Wink to the suburb of Hendersonville near Nashville. Orbison's second son, Anthony King, would follow in 1962. Melson also moved to Hendersonville soon after, and began working on "Blue Angel" together, which was recorded in August 1960. This hit was a more complex song, yet it still peaked at number nine in the USA. The follow-up single, "I'm Hurtin'" (with "I Can't Stop Loving You" as the B-side) rose to number 27 in the US, but failed to chart in the UK. After the success of "Blue Angel", Orbison undertook a hectic touring schedule, often performing with his neighbor Patsy Cline. During this time, Claudette was lonely and unhappy, and some people said that Orbison was unfaithful to her while he was on tour.

Back in the studio, seeking a change from the pop sound of "Only the Lonely", "Blue Angel", and "I'm Hurtin'", Orbison worked on a new song, "Running Scared", about a man worried that his girlfriend is about to leave him for another man. Orbison encountered difficulty when he found himself unable to hit the song's highest note without his voice breaking. He was backed by an orchestra in the studio, and Porter told him he would have to sing louder than his accompaniment because the orchestra was unable to be softer than his voice. Fred Foster then put Orbison in the corner of the studio and surrounded him with coat racks, forming an improvised isolation booth to emphasize his voice. Orbison was unhappy with the first two takes. In the third, however, he abandoned the idea of using falsetto and sang the final high 'A' naturally, so astonishing everyone present that the accompanying musicians stopped playing. On that third take, "Running Scared" was completed. Fred Foster later recalled, "He did it, and everybody looked around in amazement. Nobody had heard anything like it before." Just weeks later, "Running Scared" became Orbison's first number-one hit on the Billboard Hot 100 chart and it reached number 9 in the UK. The composition of Orbison's following hits reflected "Running Scared", a story about an emotionally vulnerable man facing loss or grief, with a crescendo culminating in a surprise climax that employed Orbison's dynamic voice.

The B-side "Crying" followed soon after, and reached the top-five singles in August 1961. "Crying" was coupled with an up-tempo R&B song, "Candy Man", written by Fred Neil and Beverley Ross, which reached the Billboard Top 30, staying on the charts for two months. By the end of 1961, Orbison had recorded six hit singles in a row over the past two years. Orbison's second son was born the same year, and Orbison hit number four in the United States and number two in the UK with "Dream Baby (How Long Must I Dream)", an upbeat song by country songwriter Cindy Walker. Orbison enlisted The Webbs, from Dothan, Alabama, as his backing band. The band changed their names to the Candymen (in reference to the hit song) and played with Orbison from 1962 to 1967. They later went on to have their own career, releasing a few singles and two albums, with some members going on to help form the Atlanta Rhythm Section. Also in 1962, he charted with "The Crowd", "Leah", and "Workin' for the Man", which he wrote about working one summer in the oil fields near Wink. Orbison's relationship with Joe Melson, however, was deteriorating, over Melson's growing concerns that his own solo career would never get off the ground.

Orbison first met Bob Dylan at Dylan's 21st birthday party in May 1962.

From 1959 to 1963, Orbison was the top-selling American artist and one of the world’s biggest names in music.

==== "In Dreams" and international tours ====
Orbison's string of top-40 hits continued with "In Dreams" (US number seven in January 1963, UK number six), "Falling" (US number 22, UK number 9) and "Mean Woman Blues" (US number five, UK number three) coupled with "Blue Bayou" (US number 29, UK number three). According to the discography in The Authorized Roy Orbison, a rare alternative version of "Blue Bayou" was released in Italy. Orbison finished 1963 with a Christmas song written by Willie Nelson, "Pretty Paper" (US number 15 in 1963, UK number six in 1964).

As "In Dreams" was released in April 1963, Orbison was asked to replace Duane Eddy on a tour of the UK in top billing with the Beatles. The tour sold out in one afternoon. When Orbison arrived in Britain, however, he realized he was no longer the main draw. He had never heard of the Beatles, and annoyed, asked rhetorically, "What's a Beatle, anyway?" to which John Lennon replied, after tapping his shoulder, "I am". On the opening night, Orbison opted to go onstage first, although he was the more established act. The Beatles stood dumbfounded backstage as Orbison simply played through 14 encores. Finally, when the audience began chanting "We want Roy!" again, Lennon and Paul McCartney physically held Orbison back. Ringo Starr later said, "In Glasgow, we were all backstage listening to the tremendous applause he was getting. He was just standing there, not moving or anything." Through the tour, however, the two acts quickly learned to get along, a process made easier by the fact that the Beatles admired his work. Orbison felt a kinship with Lennon, but it was George Harrison with whom he would later form a strong friendship.

In 1963, touring took a toll on Orbison's personal life. After discovering a letter from one of Orbison's secret girlfriends, his wife Claudette had an affair with the builder of their home in Tennessee. Billy Pat Ellis said, "Claudette had the affair because Roy was gone a lot and she got lonely and wanted to prove she was attractive again". When Orbison toured Britain again in the autumn of 1963, she joined him.

Later in 1963, Orbison toured England, Ireland, and Canada. In 1964, he toured Australia and New Zealand with the Beach Boys and returned again to Britain and Ireland, where he was so besieged by teenaged girls that the Irish police had to halt his performances to pull the girls off him. He traveled to Australia again in 1965, this time with the Rolling Stones. Mick Jagger later remarked, referring to a snapshot he took of Orbison in New Zealand, "a fine figure of a man in the hot springs, he was."

==== "Oh, Pretty Woman" ====
"Oh, Pretty Woman" (1964)
The opening guitar riff of "Oh, Pretty Woman" was a direct influence on "(I Can't Get No) Satisfaction" by the Rolling Stones.

Orbison also began collaborating with Bill Dees, whom he had known in Texas. With Dees, he wrote "It's Over", a number-one hit in the UK. When Claudette walked in the room where Dees and Orbison were writing to say she was heading for Nashville, Orbison asked if she had any money. Dees said, "A pretty woman never needs any money". Just 40 minutes later, "Oh, Pretty Woman" was completed. A riff-laden masterpiece that employed a playful growl he got from a Bob Hope movie, the epithet mercy Orbison uttered when he was unable to hit a note, it rose to number one in the autumn of 1964 in the United States and stayed on the charts for 14 weeks. It rose to number one in the UK, as well, spending a total of 18 weeks on the charts. The single sold over seven million copies. Orbison's success was greater in Britain; as Billboard magazine noted, "In a 68-week period that began on August 8, 1963, Roy Orbison was the only American artist to have a number-one single in Britain. He did it twice, with 'It's Over' on June 25, 1964, and 'Oh, Pretty Woman' on October 8, 1964. The latter song also went to number one in America, making Orbison impervious to the current chart dominance of British artists on both sides of the Atlantic."

=== 1965–1969: Career decline and tragedies ===
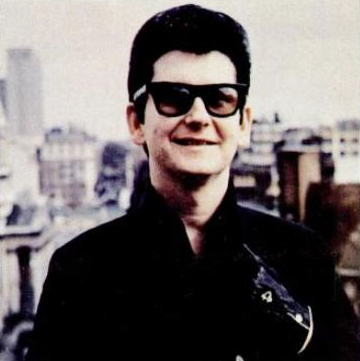
Orbison in 1967

By late 1964, Orbison had "occasionally treated himself to a groupie" and his wife Claudette had had an affair with the builder Braxton Dixon, who had built Orbison's house. After Roy became aware of the affair, he fired Dixon and finished building the house himself (with the help of a hired carpenter). In early 1965, Roy confirmed that Claudette and he were divorced. Later in 1965, Claudette gave birth to Roy's third child, and Roy and Claudette reunited several months later.

Orbison's singles in early 1965 had been unsuccessful, and his contract with Monument was expiring soon. Wesley Rose, at this time acting as Orbison's agent, moved him from Monument Records to MGM Records (though in Europe he remained with Decca's London Records) for $1 million and with the understanding that he would expand into television and films, as Elvis Presley had done. Orbison was a film enthusiast, and when not touring, writing, or recording, he dedicated time to seeing up to three films a day. The move was described as Orbison "joining the ranks of fading rock stars fleeing to MGM".

Rose also became Orbison's producer. Fred Foster later suggested that Rose's takeover was responsible for the commercial failure of Orbison's work at MGM. Engineer Bill Porter agreed that Orbison's best work could only be achieved with RCA Victor's A-Team in Nashville. Orbison's first collection at MGM, an album titled There Is Only One Roy Orbison, sold fewer than 200,000 copies. With the onset of the British Invasion in 1964–65, the direction of popular music shifted dramatically, and most performers of Orbison's generation (Orbison was 28 in 1964) were driven from the charts. The contractual requirement to release a certain number of singles and albums per year for MGM also took its toll on the quality of Orbison's songs.

Orbison was fascinated with machines. He was known to follow a car that he liked and make the driver an offer on the spot. While on tour again in the UK in 1966, Orbison broke his foot falling off a motorcycle in front of thousands of screaming fans at a race track; he performed his show that evening in a cast. Claudette traveled to Britain to accompany Roy for the remainder of the tour. It was now made public that the couple had happily remarried and were back together (they had remarried in December 1965).

Roy and Claudette shared a love for motorcycles after Roy had been introduced to them by Elvis Presley. Orbison was a daredevil driver, blasting around on his Harley-Davidson motorcycle and owning a Ferrari car, which he used to challenge other drivers to race him on the highway. On June 6, 1966, when Orbison and Claudette were both riding their motorcycles home from Bristol, Tennessee, she was struck by a pickup truck in Gallatin, Tennessee, and thrown into the air. She was taken by ambulance to the hospital, but her liver was seriously injured and she died, aged 25.

A grieving Orbison threw himself into his work, collaborating with Bill Dees to write music for The Fastest Guitar Alive, a film in which MGM had scheduled for him to star, as well. It was initially planned as a dramatic Western, but was rewritten as a comedy. Orbison's character was a spy who stole and had to protect and deliver a cache of gold to the Confederate Army during the American Civil War, and was supplied with a guitar that turned into a rifle. The prop allowed him to deliver the line, "I could kill you with this and play your funeral march at the same time", with, according to biographer Colin Escott, "zero conviction". Orbison was pleased with the film, although it proved to be a critical and box-office failure. While MGM had included five films in his contract, no more were made.

He recorded an album dedicated to the songs of Don Gibson and another of Hank Williams covers, but both sold poorly. During the counterculture era, with the charts dominated by artists including Jimi Hendrix, Jefferson Airplane, the Rolling Stones, and the Doors, Orbison lost mainstream appeal, yet seemed confident that this would return, later saying: "[I] didn't hear a lot I could relate to, so I kind of stood there like a tree where the winds blow and the seasons change, and you're still there and you bloom again." Orbison's single "Cry Softly Lonely One" from March 1967 was his last song to enter the top 100 until the 1980s.

During a tour of Britain and playing Birmingham on Saturday, September 14, 1968, he received the news that his home in Hendersonville, Tennessee, had burned down, and his two eldest sons had died. This occurred two years after the death of his wife Claudette and Orbison's grief meant he could not write songs. Fire officials stated that the cause of the fire may have been an aerosol can, which possibly contained lacquer. The property was sold to Johnny Cash, whose house at the same location also burned down later.

During the 1968 tour of England, Orbison and his childhood friend Bobby Blackburn slept with many girls over the course of two months, and used a calendar on the wall to track when each girl was arriving and leaving their rented apartment in Upper Brook Street in London. During this time, Orbison met the 16-year-old German girl Barbara Wellhöner Jakobs, with whom he became fascinated, although Orbison continued to see other girls in the meantime. On May 25, 1969, Orbison and Barbara married. Roy was 33 years old at the time, and sources vary regarding whether Barbara was 17, 18, or 19. Wesley (born 1965), his youngest son with Claudette, was raised by Orbison's parents. Orbison and Barbara had a son (Roy Kelton Jr.) in 1970 and another (Alexander) in 1975.

=== 1970s: Struggles ===
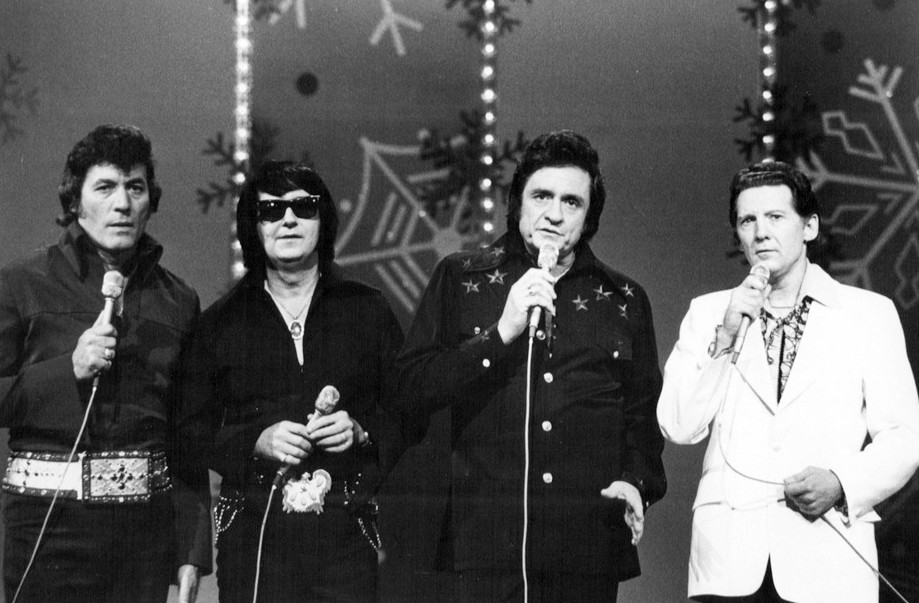
Carl Perkins, Roy Orbison, Johnny Cash, and Jerry Lee Lewis in a televised 1977 Christmas special

Orbison continued recording albums in the 1970s, but his career stagnated during this decade. At the beginning of the decade, Orbison started to wear his hair straight, instead of combing it back. He would wear it like this for the rest of his life.. In 1974, he switched record labels from MGM to Mercury Records for a one-album deal. Although the peak of his success was over, his single "Penny Arcade" was number one in Australia for many weeks and "Too Soon to Know" reached number three in England. His fortunes sank so low in America that his concerts were mostly empty, such as the concert at Cincinnati Gardens that he played on his 40th birthday in April 1976. Peter Lehman observed that Orbison's absence was a part of the mystery of his persona: "Since it was never clear where he had come from, no one seemed to pay much mind to where he had gone; he was just gone." However, several artists released popular covers of his songs. Orbison's version of "Love Hurts" was remade by Gram Parsons and Emmylou Harris, again by hard rock band Nazareth, and by Jim Capaldi. Sonny James' version of "Only the Lonely" reached number one on the country music charts. Bruce Springsteen ended his concerts with Orbison songs, and Glen Campbell had a minor hit with a remake of "Dream Baby".

A compilation of Orbison's greatest hits reached number one in the UK in January 1976, and Orbison began to open concerts that year for the Eagles, who had started as Linda Ronstadt's backup band. Ronstadt covered "Blue Bayou" in 1977, her version reaching number three on the Billboard charts and remaining in the charts for 24 weeks. Orbison credited this cover in particular for reviving his memory in the popular mind, if not his career. He signed again with Monument in 1976 and recorded Regeneration with Fred Foster, but it proved no more successful than before.

In late 1977, Orbison was not feeling well and decided to spend the winter in Hawaii. He checked in to a hospital there, where testing discovered that he had severely obstructed coronary arteries and was barely alive. Orbison underwent open-heart surgery on January 18, 1978. He had suffered from duodenal ulcers since 1960 and had been a heavy smoker since adolescence. Orbison said he felt rejuvenated after the procedure, but his weight would continue to fluctuate for the rest of his life. He also continued to smoke cigarettes, despite the advice of his doctor..

=== 1980–1988: Revival and Traveling Wilburys ===
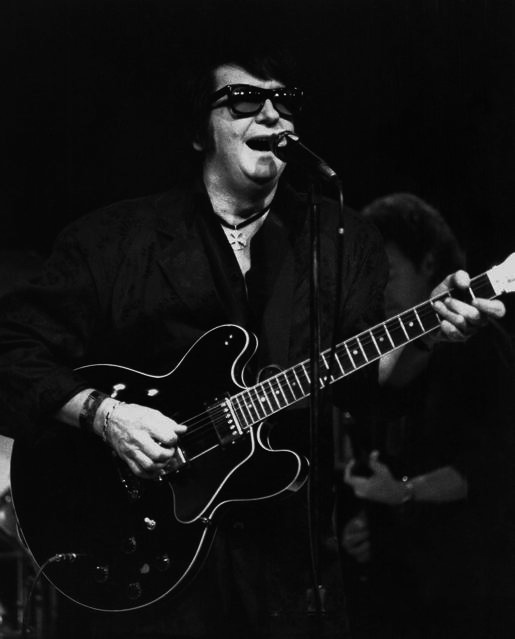
Orbison performing in New York in 1987

In 1980, Don McLean recorded a cover of Orbison's 1961 hit single "Crying" and it went to the top of the charts, first in the Netherlands then reaching number five in the US and staying on the charts for 15 weeks; it was number one in the UK for three weeks and also topped the Irish charts. In 1981, he performed "Pretty Woman" on an episode of The Dukes of Hazzard. Orbison was all but forgotten in the US, yet he reached popularity in less likely places such as Bulgaria in 1982. He was astonished to find that he was as popular there as he had been in 1964, and he was forced to stay in his hotel room because he was mobbed on the streets of Sofia. In 1981, Emmylou Harris and he won a Grammy Award for their duet "That Lovin' You Feelin' Again" from the comedy film Roadie (in which Orbison also played a cameo role), and things were picking up. It was Orbison's first Grammy, and he felt hopeful of making a full return to popular music, In the meantime, Van Halen released a hard-rock cover of "Oh, Pretty Woman" on their 1982 album Diver Down, further exposing a younger generation to Orbison's music.

Orbison, his wife, and two oldest children moved from Nashville to Malibu in 1986. Following the move, Orbison's involvement with the Los Angeles creative community proved to be very important for him..

Orbison was alleged to have originally declined David Lynch's request to allow the use of "In Dreams" for the film Blue Velvet (1986), although Lynch has stated to the contrary that his producers and he obtained permission to use the song without speaking to Orbison in the first place. Lynch's first choice for a song had actually been "Crying"; the song served as one of several obsessions of psychopath Frank Booth (Dennis Hopper). It was lip-synched by Ben (Dean Stockwell), Booth's drug-dealer boss, using an industrial work light as a pretend microphone, lighting his face. In later scenes, Booth demands the song be played repeatedly, and also wanting the song while beating the protagonist. During filming, Lynch would also sit his cast down every few hours and ask them to listen to the song. Orbison was initially shocked at its use; he saw the film in a theater in Malibu and later said, "I was mortified because they were talking about the 'candy-colored clown' in relation to a dope deal ... I thought, 'What in the world ...?' But later, when I was touring, we got the video out and I really got to appreciate what David gave to the song, and what the song gave to the movie—how it achieved this otherworldly quality that added a whole new dimension to 'In Dreams'." The use of "In Dreams" in the film greatly helped Orbison's comeback.

In 1987, Orbison released an album of re-recorded hits titled In Dreams: The Greatest Hits. "Life Fades Away", a song he co-wrote with his friend Glenn Danzig and recorded, was featured in the film Less than Zero (1987). k.d. lang and he performed a duet of "Crying" for inclusion on the soundtrack to the film Hiding Out (1987); the pair received a Grammy Award for Best Country Vocal Collaboration after Orbison's death.

Also in 1987, Orbison was inducted into the Nashville Songwriters Hall of Fame and was initiated into the Rock and Roll Hall of Fame by Bruce Springsteen, who concluded his speech with a reference to his own album Born to Run: "I wanted a record with words like Bob Dylan that sounded like Phil Spector—but, most of all, I wanted to sing like Roy Orbison. Now, everyone knows that no one sings like Roy Orbison." In response, Orbison asked Springsteen for a copy of the speech, and said of his induction that he felt "validated" by the honor. After the awards, Orbison signed with Virgin Records, which immediately released a "greatest hits" album and began preparing for an album of new songs.

A few months later, Orbison and Springsteen paired again to film a concert at the Cocoanut Grove nightclub in Los Angeles. They were joined by Jackson Browne, T Bone Burnett, Elvis Costello, Tom Waits, Bonnie Raitt, Jennifer Warnes, James Burton, JD Souther, and k.d. lang. Lang later recounted how humbled Orbison had been by the display of support from so many talented and busy musicians: "Roy looked at all of us and said, 'If there is anything I can ever do for you, please call on me'. He was very serious. It was his way of thanking us. It was very emotional." The concert was filmed in one take and aired on Cinemax under the title Roy Orbison and Friends: A Black and White Night; it was released on video by Virgin Records, selling 50,000 copies. The concert is considered a landmark in Orbison's career.

The creation of the world's most recognized supergroup, Traveling Wilburys began in 1987, when Orbison began collaborating seriously with Electric Light Orchestra bandleader Jeff Lynne on a new album. Lynne had just completed production work on George Harrison's Cloud Nine album, and all three ate lunch together one day when Orbison accepted an invitation to sing on Harrison's new single. They subsequently contacted Bob Dylan, who, in turn, allowed them to use a recording studio in his home. Along the way, Harrison made a quick visit to Tom Petty's residence to obtain his guitar; Petty and his band had backed Dylan on his last tour. By that evening, the group had written "Handle with Care", which led to the concept of recording an entire album. They called themselves the Traveling Wilburys, representing themselves as half-brothers with the same father. They gave themselves stage names; Orbison chose his from his musical hero, calling himself "Lefty Wilbury" after Lefty Frizzell. Expanding on the concept of a traveling band of raucous musicians, Orbison offered a quote about the group's foundation in honor: "Some people say Daddy was a cad and a bounder. I remember him as a Baptist minister."

Lynne later spoke of the recording sessions: "Everybody just sat there going, 'Wow, it's Roy Orbison!' ... Even though he's become your pal and you're hanging out and having a laugh and going to dinner, as soon as he gets behind that [mic] and he's doing his business, suddenly it's shudder time." The band's debut album, Traveling Wilburys Vol. 1 (1988), was released on October 25, 1988. Orbison was given one solo track, "Not Alone Any More", on the album. His contributions were highly praised by the press. Orbison determinedly pursued his second chance at stardom, but he expressed amazement at his success: "It's very nice to be wanted again, but I still can't quite believe it." He lost some weight to fit his new image and the constant demand of touring, as well as the newer demands of making videos. In the final three months of his life, he gave Rolling Stone extensive access to his daily activities; he intended to write an autobiography and wanted Martin Sheen to play him in a biopic.

Orbison completed a solo comeback album, Mystery Girl, in November 1988. Mystery Girl was co-produced by Jeff Lynne. Orbison considered Lynne to be the best producer with whom he had ever collaborated. Elvis Costello, Bono, Orbison's son Wesley, and others offered their songs to him.

Around November 1988, Orbison confided in Johnny Cash that he was having chest pains. Orbison traveled to Europe and received an award at the Diamond Awards festival in Antwerp, where footage for the video for "You Got It" was filmed. He gave several interviews a day in a hectic schedule and became ill with a blinding headache during the final interview. A few days later, a manager at a club in Boston was concerned that he looked ill, but Orbison played the show to a standing ovation.

== Death ==
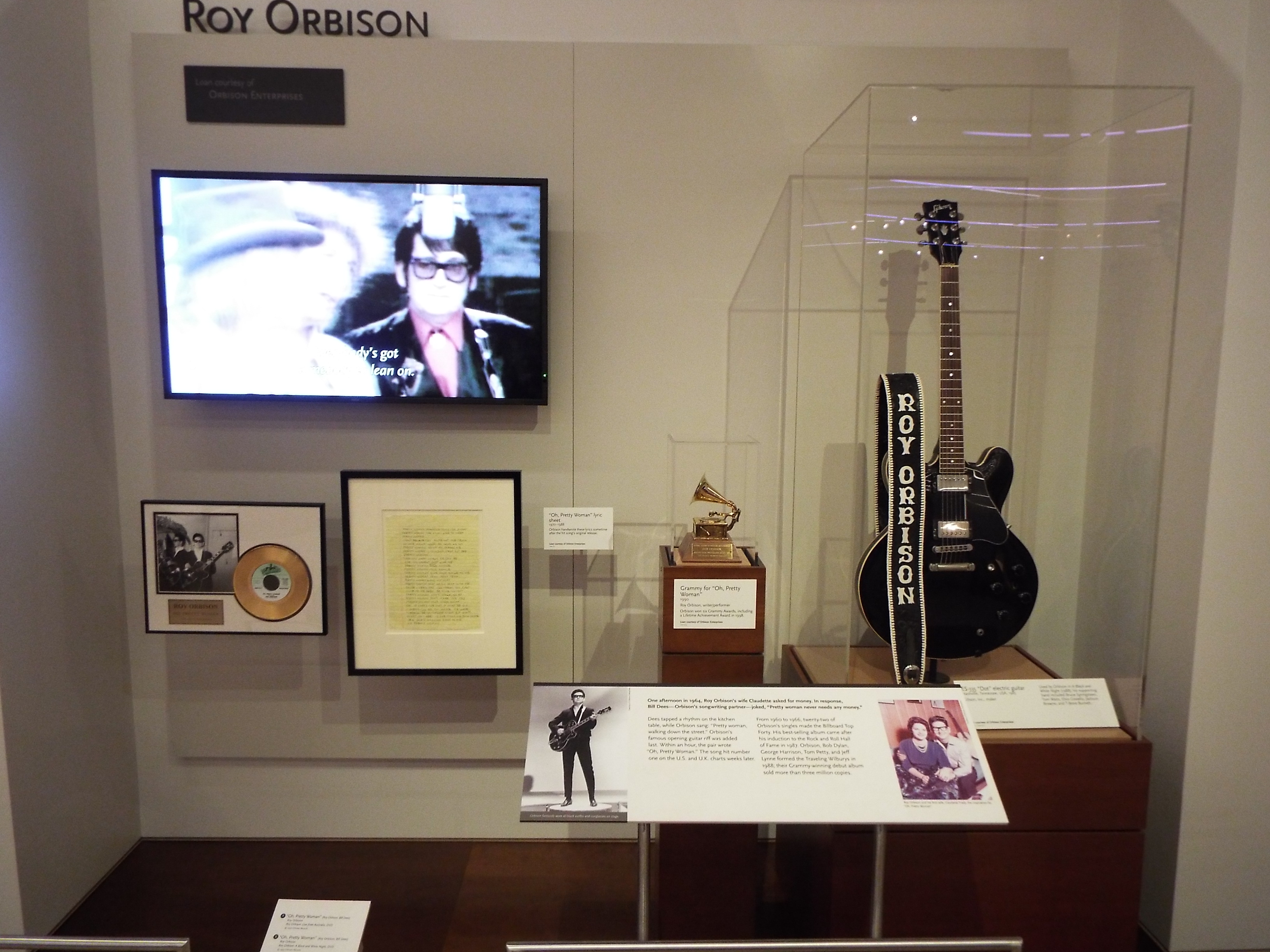
The Roy Orbison exhibit in the Artist Gallery of the Musical Instrument Museum (Phoenix)

Orbison performed at the Front Row Theater in Highland Heights, Ohio, on December 4, 1988. Exhausted, he returned to his home in Hendersonville to rest for several days before flying again to London to film two more videos for the Traveling Wilburys. He was also booked to tour the U.S. and Europe in the following year.

On December 6, he spent the day purchasing parts for model airplanes with his bus driver and friend Benny Birchfield and ate supper at Birchfield's home in Hendersonville (Birchfield was married to country star Jean Shepard). After the meal, Orbison went to his mother's house and chatted with his son Wesley. He went to the bathroom, but did not return for 30 minutes. He was found collapsed on the bathroom floor and rushed to the hospital by ambulance, where he died of a heart attack at the age of 52.

A public memorial attended by friends, family, and fans was organized by friend Jean Shepard and held at the College Heights Baptist Church in Gallatin, Tennessee, on December 11. In Los Angeles, Barbara Orbison organized a "Celebration of Life" attended by friends and celebrities at the Wiltern Theatre on December 13. Orbison's body was buried at Westwood Village Memorial Park Cemetery in an unmarked grave.

== Posthumous career ==
Orbison's posthumous album Mystery Girl was released by Virgin Records on January 31, 1989 and became the highest-selling album of his career. The biggest hit from Mystery Girl was "You Got It", written with Jeff Lynne and Tom Petty. "You Got It" rose to No. 9 in the US and No. 3 in the UK. The song earned Orbison a posthumous Grammy Award nomination. According to Rolling Stone, "Mystery Girl cloaks the epic sweep and grandeur of his classic sound in meticulous, modern production—the album encapsulates everything that made Orbison great, and for that reason it makes a fitting valedictory."

Traveling Wilburys Vol. 1 spent 53 weeks on the US charts, peaking at number three. It reached number one in Australia and number 16 in the UK. The album won a Grammy for Best Rock Performance by a Duo or Group. Rolling Stone included it in the top 100 albums of the decade.

On April 8, 1989, Orbison became the first deceased musician since Elvis Presley to have two albums in the US top five at the same time, with Traveling Wilburys Vol. 1 at number four and his own Mystery Girl at number five. In the United Kingdom, he achieved even greater posthumous success, with two solo albums in the top three on February 11, 1989 (Mystery Girl was number two and the compilation The Legendary Roy Orbison was number three).

Although the video for the Traveling Wilburys' "Handle with Care" was filmed with Orbison, the video for "End of the Line" was filmed and released posthumously. During Orbison's vocal solo parts in "End of the Line", the video shows his guitar in a rocking chair next to his framed photo.

On October 20, 1992, King of Hearts—another album of Orbison songs—was released. Earlier in the 1990s, Rodney Crowell and Orbison’s friend and occasional songwriting partner Will Jennings wrote the lyrics to a recording of a melody that Orbison had made before his death; they titled the resulting song, which was recorded by Crowell and released in 1992, “What Kind of Love”. In 1996, the album The Very Best of Roy Orbison documented his entire career. Roy's wife Barbara managed his estate and released albums through the Roy Orbison Enterprises company. Following Barbara's death in December 2011, the company management was taken over by Roy's sons Alex and Roy Kelton Jr.

In 2014, a demonstration recording of Orbison's "The Way Is Love" was released as part of the 25th-anniversary deluxe edition of Mystery Girl. The song was originally recorded on a stereo cassette player around 1986. Orbison's sons contributed instrumentation on the track along with Orbison's vocals; it was produced by John Carter Cash.

On December 4, 2015, the studio album One of the Lonely Ones, recorded by Orbison in 1969, was posthumously released. The album, which Orbison recorded surreptitiously in the aftermath of his first wife Claudette's death in a motorcycle accident and the death of their two sons in a house fire two years later, was long believed lost.

== Public image ==
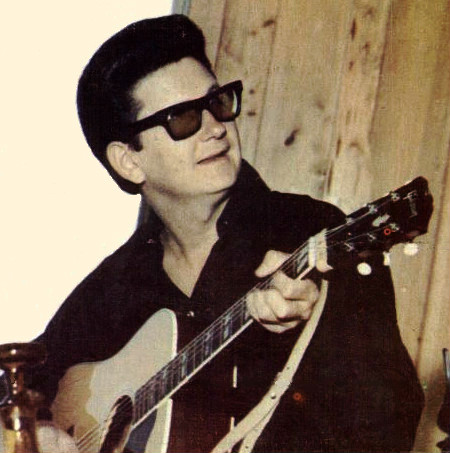
Orbison performing in his trademark dark glasses

Orbison eventually developed an image that did not reflect his personality. He had no publicist in the early 1960s, so had little presence in fan magazines, and his single sleeves did not feature his picture. LIFE called him an "anonymous celebrity". After leaving his thick eyeglasses on an airplane in 1963, Orbison was forced to wear his prescription Faosa sunglasses on stage and found that he preferred them. The sunglasses led some people to assume he was blind. His black clothes and song lyrics emphasized the image of mystery and introversion. Orbison later recalled that he "wasn't trying to be weird ... I didn't have a manager who told me to dress or how to present myself or anything, but the image developed of a man of mystery and a quiet man in black somewhat of a recluse, although I never was, really."

== Style and legacy ==
"[Roy Orbison] was the true master of the romantic apocalypse you dreaded and knew was coming after the first night you whispered 'I Love You' to your first girlfriend. You were going down. Roy was the coolest uncool loser you'd ever seen. With his Coke-bottle black glasses, his three-octave range, he seemed to take joy sticking his knife deep into the hot belly of your teenage insecurities."

— Bruce Springsteen, 2012 SXSW Keynote Address

Rock and roll in the 1950s was typically defined by a driving backbeat, heavy guitars, and lyrical themes that glorified youthful rebellion. Few of Orbison's recordings have these characteristics. The structure and themes of his songs defied convention, and his much-praised voice and performance style were very different from his peers. Many of his contemporaries compared his music with that of classically trained musicians, although Orbison never mentioned any classical music influences. Peter Lehman summarized it, writing, "He achieved what he did not by copying classical music, but by creating a unique form of popular music that drew upon a wide variety of music popular during his youth." Orbison was known as "the Caruso of Rock" and "the Big O".

Roy's Boys LLC, a Nashville-based company founded by Orbison's sons to administer their father's catalog and safeguard his legacy, announced a November 16, 2018, release of Unchained Melodies: Roy Orbison with the Royal Philharmonic Orchestra album, as well as an autumn 2018 Roy Orbison hologram tour called In Dreams: Roy Orbison in Concert.

=== Song structures ===
Music critic Dave Marsh wrote that Orbison's compositions "define a world unto themselves more completely than any other body of work in pop music". Orbison's music, like the man himself, has been described as timeless, diverting from contemporary rock and roll and bordering on the eccentric, within a hair's breadth of being weird. Peter Watrous, writing for the New York Times, declared in a concert review, "He has perfected an odd vision of popular music, one in which eccentricity and imagination beat back all the pressures toward conformity".

In the 1960s, Orbison refused to splice edits of songs together which was then becoming standard for the recording industry, and insisted on recording songs in single takes with all the instruments and singers together. The only convention Orbison followed in his most popular songs is the time limit for radio fare in pop songs. Otherwise, each seems to follow a separate structure. Using the standard 32-bar form for verses and choruses, normal pop songs followed the verse-chorus-verse-chorus-bridge-verse-chorus structure. Where A represents the verse, B represents the chorus, and C the bridge, most pop songs can be represented by A-B-A-B-C-A-B, like "Ooby Dooby" and "Claudette". Orbison's "In Dreams" was a song in seven movements that can be represented as Intro-A-B-C-D-E-F; no sections are repeated. In "Running Scared", however, the entire song repeats to build suspense to a final climax, to be represented as A-A-A-A-B. "Crying" is more complex, changing parts toward the end to be represented as A-B-C-D-E-F-A-B'-C'-D'-E'-F'. Although Orbison recorded and wrote standard structure songs before "Only the Lonely", he claimed never to have learned how to write them:

I'm sure we had to study composition or something like that at school, and they'd say, 'This is the way you do it,' and that's the way I would have done it, so being blessed again with not knowing what was wrong or what was right, I went on my own way. ... So, the structure sometimes has the chorus at the end of the song, and sometimes there is no chorus, it just goes ... But that's always after the fact—as I'm writing, it all sounds natural and in sequence to me.

— Roy Orbison

Elton John's songwriting partner and main lyricist Bernie Taupin wrote that Orbison's songs always made "radical left turns", and k.d. lang declared that good songwriting comes from being constantly surprised, such as how the entirety of "Running Scared" eventually depends on the final note, one word. Some of the musicians who worked with Orbison were confounded by what he asked them to do. Nashville session guitarist Jerry Kennedy stated, "Roy went against the grain. The first time you'd hear something, it wouldn't sound right. But after a few playbacks, it would start to grow on you."

=== Lyrical themes ===
Critic Dave Marsh categorizes Orbison's ballads into themes reflecting pain and loss, and dreaming. A third category is his up-tempo rockabilly songs such as "Go! Go! Go!" and "Mean Woman Blues" that are more thematically simple, addressing his feelings and intentions in a masculine braggadocio. In concert, Orbison placed the up-tempo songs between the ballads to keep from being too consistently dark or grim.

In 1990, Colin Escott wrote an introduction to Orbison's biography published in a CD box set: "Orbison was the master of compression. Working the singles era, he could relate a short story, or establish a mood in under three minutes. If you think that's easy—try it. His greatest recordings were quite simply perfect; not a word or note surplus to intention." After attending a show in 1988, Peter Watrous of The New York Times wrote that Orbison's songs are "dreamlike claustrophobically intimate set pieces". Music critic Ken Emerson writes that the "apocalyptic romanticism" in Orbison's music was well-crafted for the films in which his songs appeared in the 1980s because the music was "so over-the-top that dreams become delusions, and self-pity paranoia", striking "a post-modern nerve". Led Zeppelin singer Robert Plant favored American R&B music as a youth, but beyond the black musicians, he named Elvis and Orbison especially as foreshadowing the emotions he would experience: "The poignancy of the combination of lyric and voice was stunning. [Orbison] used drama to great effect and he wrote dramatically."

The loneliness in Orbison's songs for which he became most famous, he both explained and downplayed: "I don't think I've been any more lonely than anyone else ... Although if you grow up in West Texas, there are a lot of ways to be lonely." His music offered an alternative to the postured masculinity that was pervasive in music and culture. Robin Gibb of the Bee Gees stated, "He made emotion fashionable, that it was all right to talk about and sing about very emotional things. For men to sing about very emotional things ... Before that no one would do it." Orbison acknowledged this in looking back on the era in which he became popular: "When ["Crying"] came out I don't think anyone had accepted the fact that a man should cry when he wants to cry."

=== Voice quality ===
What separates Orbison from so many other multi-octave-spanning power singers is that he can hit the biggest notes imaginable and still sound unspeakably sad at the same time. All his vocal gymnastics were just a means to a powerful end, not a mission unto themselves. Roy Orbison didn't just sing beautifully—he sang brokenheartedly.

— Stephen Thompson, NPR

Orbison admitted that he did not think his voice was put to appropriate use until "Only the Lonely" in 1960, when it was able, in his words, to allow its "flowering". Carl Perkins, however, toured with Orbison while they were both signed with Sun Records and recalled a specific concert when Orbison covered the Nelson Eddy and Jeanette MacDonald standard "Indian Love Call", and had the audience completely silenced, in awe. When compared to the Everly Brothers, who often used the same session musicians, Orbison is credited with "a passionate intensity" that, according to The Rolling Stone Illustrated History of Rock and Roll, made "his love, his life, and, indeed, the whole world [seem] to be coming to an end—not with a whimper, but an agonized, beautiful bang".

Bruce Springsteen and Billy Joel both commented on the otherworldly quality of Orbison's voice. Dwight Yoakam stated that Orbison's voice sounded like "the cry of an angel falling backward through an open window". Barry Gibb of the Bee Gees went further to say that when he heard "Crying" for the first time, "That was it. To me that was the voice of God." Elvis Presley stated Orbison's voice was the greatest and most distinctive he had ever heard. Orbison's music and voice have been compared to opera by Bob Dylan, Tom Waits, and songwriter Will Jennings, among others. Dylan marked Orbison as a specific influence, remarking that nothing like him was on radio in the early 1960s:

With Roy, you didn't know if you were listening to mariachi or opera. He kept you on your toes. With him, it was all about fat and blood. He sounded like he was singing from an Olympian mountaintop. [After "Ooby Dooby"] he was now singing his compositions in three or four octaves that made you want to drive your car over a cliff. He sang like a professional criminal ... His voice could jar a corpse, always leave you muttering to yourself something like, "Man, I don't believe it".

— Bob Dylan

Likewise, Tim Goodwin, who conducted the orchestra that backed Orbison in Bulgaria, had been told that Orbison's voice would be a singular experience to hear. When Orbison started with "Crying" and hit the high notes, Goodwin stated: "The strings were playing and the band had built up and, sure enough, the hair on the back of my neck just all started standing up. It was an incredible physical sensation." Bassist Jerry Scheff, who backed Orbison in his A Black and White Night concert, wrote about him, "Roy Orbison was like an opera singer. His voice melted out of his mouth into the stratosphere and back. He never seemed like he was trying to sing, he just did it."

His voice ranged from baritone to tenor, and music scholars have suggested that he had a three- or four-octave range.

Orbison's severe stage fright was particularly noticeable in the 1970s and early 1980s. During the first few songs in a concert, the vibrato in his voice was almost uncontrollable, but afterward, it became stronger and more dependable. This also happened with age. Orbison noticed that he was unable to control the tremor in the late afternoon and evenings, and chose to record in the mornings when control was possible.

=== Live performances ===
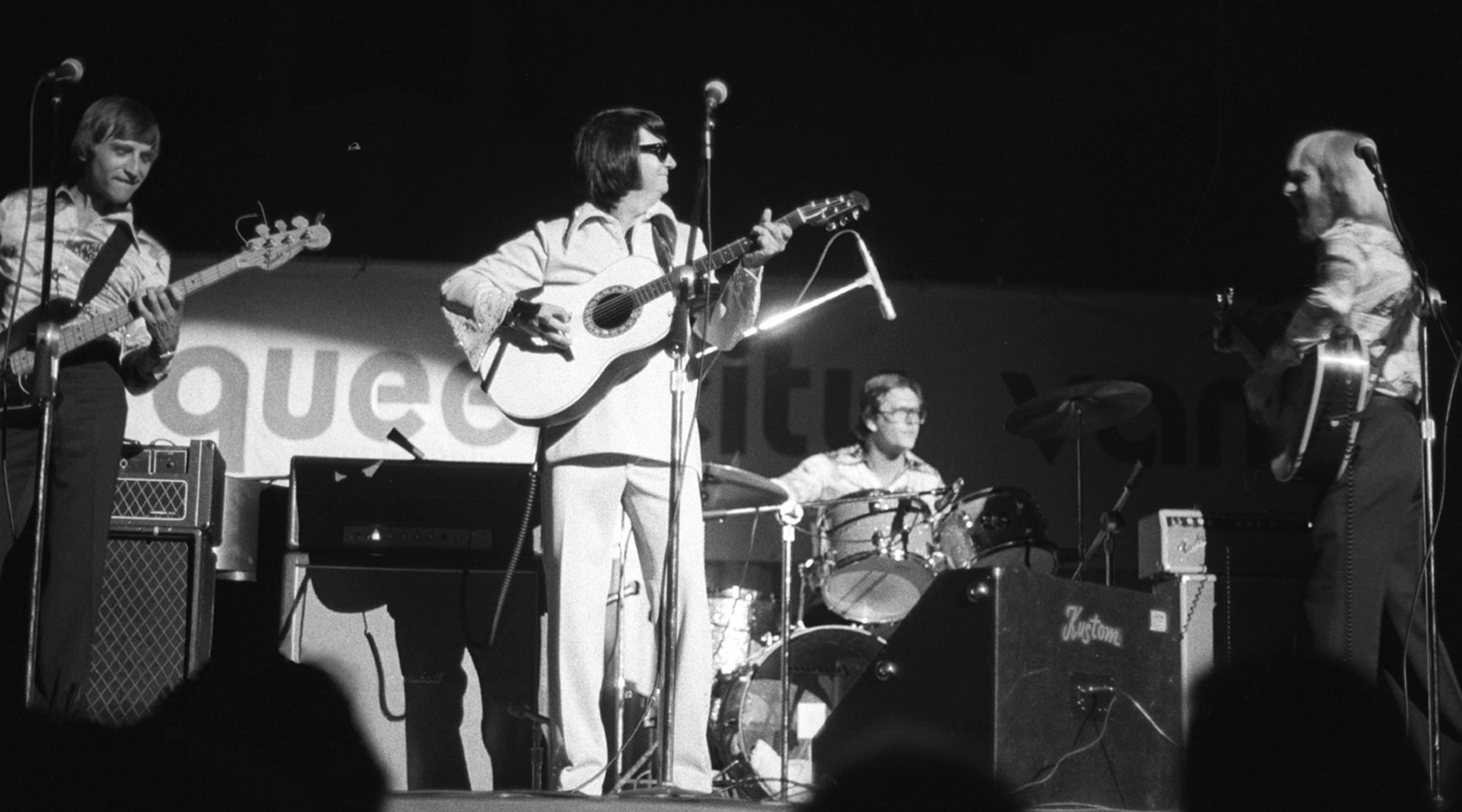
Orbison, center (in white), performing in 1976

Orbison often excused his motionless performances by saying that his songs did not allow instrumental sections so he could move or dance on stage, although songs like "Mean Woman Blues" did offer that. He was aware of his unique performance style, even in the early 1960s, when he commented, "I'm not a super personality—on stage or off. I mean, you could put workers like Chubby Checker or Bobby Rydell in second-rate shows and they'd still shine through, but not me. I'd have to be prepared. People come to hear my music, my songs. That's what I have to give them."

k.d. lang compared Orbison to a tree, with passive but solid beauty. This image of Orbison as immovable was so associated with him it was parodied by John Belushi on Saturday Night Live, as Belushi, dressed as Orbison, falls over while singing "Oh, Pretty Woman", and continues to play as his bandmates set him upright again. However, lang quantified this style by saying, "It's so hard to explain what Roy's energy was like because he would fill a room with his energy and presence, but not say a word. Being that he was so grounded and so strong and so gentle and quiet. He was just there."

Orbison attributed his own passion during his performances to the period when he grew up in Fort Worth while the US was mobilizing for World War II. His parents worked in a defense plant; his father brought out a guitar in the evenings playing the driving rhythm of western swing, and their friends and relatives who had just joined the military gathered to drink and sing heartily with him. Orbison later reflected, "I guess that level of intensity made a big impression on me, because it's still there. That sense of 'do it for all it's worth and do it now and do it good.' Not to analyze it too much, but I think the verve and gusto that everybody felt and portrayed around me has stayed with me all this time."

== Discography ==
Studio albums

- Lonely and Blue (1961)
- Roy Orbison at the Rock House (1961)
- Crying (1962)
- In Dreams (1963)
- Oh, Pretty Woman (non-US) (1964)
- There Is Only One Roy Orbison (1965)
- Orbisongs (1965)
- The Orbison Way (1966)
- The Classic Roy Orbison (1966)
- Roy Orbison Sings Don Gibson/Sweet Dreams (Africa) (1967)
- Cry Softly Lonely One (1967)
- Roy Orbison's Many Moods (1969)
- Hank Williams the Roy Orbison Way (1970)
- The Big O (1970)
- Roy Orbison Sings (1972)
- Memphis (1972)
- Milestones (1973)
- I'm Still in Love with You (1975)
- Regeneration (1976)
- Laminar Flow (1979)
- Class of '55: Memphis Rock & Roll Homecoming (with Johnny Cash, Jerry Lee Lewis, and Carl Perkins) (1986)
- In Dreams: The Greatest Hits (1987)

Soundtrack albums

- The Fastest Guitar Alive (1967)

Posthumous albums

- Mystery Girl (1989)
- King of Hearts (1992)
- The Last Concert (2009)
- One of the Lonely Ones (2015)

Remix albums

- A Love So Beautiful (with The Royal Philharmonic Orchestra) (2017)
- Unchained Melodies (with the Royal Philharmonic Orchestra) (2018)

Concert videos

- 1972: Live from Australia (Roy Orbison album)
- 1982: Live at Austin City Limits
- 1988: Roy Orbison and Friends: A Black and White Night

== Honors ==
Rolling Stone placed him at number 37 on their list of the "Greatest Artists of All Time" and number 13 on their list of the "100 Greatest Singers of All Time'. In 2002, Billboard magazine listed Orbison at number 74 in the Top 600 recording artists.

- Grammy Awards
  - Best Country Performance Duo or Group (1980) ("That Lovin' You Feelin' Again", with Emmylou Harris)
  - Best Spoken Word or Non-Musical Recording (1986) ("Interviews from the Class of '55 Recording Sessions", with Johnny Cash, Carl Perkins, Jerry Lee Lewis, Sam Phillips, Rick Nelson and Chips Moman)
  - Best Country Vocal Collaboration (1988) ("Crying", with k.d. lang)
  - Best Rock Performance by a Duo or Group with Vocal (1989) (Traveling Wilburys Volume One, as a member of the Traveling Wilburys)
  - Best Pop Vocal Performance, Male (1990) ("Oh, Pretty Woman")
  - Lifetime Achievement Award (1998)
- Rock and Roll Hall of Fame (1987)
- Nashville Songwriters Hall of Fame (1987)
- Songwriters Hall of Fame (1989)
- Star on the Hollywood Walk of Fame (2010)
- America's Pop Music Hall of Fame (2014)
- Memphis Music Hall of Fame (2017)
- Texas Country Music Hall of Fame (2024)

== See also ==
- List of American Grammy Award winners and nominees
