= Barbara Orbison =

German entrepreneur and music producer (1950–2011)

- Orbison in 2010
- Born: Barbara Anne Marie Wellhöner Jakobs; January 10, 1950; Bielefeld, West Germany
- Died: December 6, 2011 (aged 61); Los Angeles, California, U.S.
- Occupations: Entrepreneur, music producer/publisher
- Years active: 1969−2011
- Spouse: Roy Orbison (m. 1969; died 1988)
- Children: 2, including Alex

Barbara Orbison (born Barbara Anne Marie Wellhöner Jakobs; January 10, 1950 – December 6, 2011) was a German-born United States–based entrepreneur, music producer and publisher, and the second wife of American musician Roy Orbison.

== Biography ==
Barbara Anne Marie Wellhöner Jakobs was born in Bielefeld, Germany, on January 10, 1950. Her mother was Friedel Hitz. Aged 18, she met the 32-year-old Orbison when he asked friends to introduce him to her at Batley Variety Club, West Riding of Yorkshire, England, during Orbison's UK tour. A few weeks later, two of Orbison's three sons died in a house fire. Barbara and Orbison married on March 25, 1969, in Hendersonville, Tennessee. They divided their time between Nashville, Tennessee, and Malibu, California, bringing up their two sons, Roy Kelton Orbison, Jr. (born 1970) and Alexander "Orbi" Orbison (born 1975).

During the 1980s, she managed her husband's career and was the executive producer of his 1987 album, In Dreams: The Greatest Hits, plus his January 1988 televised music special, Roy Orbison and Friends: A Black and White Night. Following her husband's death on December 6, 1988, she took charge of his business affairs and dedicated herself to promoting his music to subsequent generations.

She worked with friend and fellow artist Jeff Lynne to assemble the posthumous release of the King of Hearts album in 1992 (an album which was re-issued in 2007 by Sony BMG after they took charge of Virgin's catalog in 2005) as well as other record projects. She co-produced Only the Lonely: The Roy Orbison Story, a European stage musical.

In late 1993, the family home in Malibu was destroyed by brush fires. Although she maintained a residence on the West Coast, she returned to Nashville where she purchased a home as well as a commercial property to house her music publishing business. Her company, Still Working Music employs songwriters such as Tommy Lee James and Chase Bryant.

Orbison was also involved with charitable causes in aid of the homeless. For Showtime, in 1990, she produced a Roy Orbison tribute at the Universal Amphitheatre in Los Angeles that raised in excess of $1 million for the city's homeless. She personally funded "Orbison House", a 21-unit residence for the mentally impaired homeless of Los Angeles.

She produced Damien Leith's album, Roy: A Tribute to Roy Orbison, which was released by Sony BMG in Australia on 15 April 2011 to coincide with Roy Orbison's 75th birthday.

== Death ==
Orbison was hospitalized from May 2011 until her death from pancreatic cancer on December 6, 2011. She was buried next to her husband at Westwood Village Memorial Park Cemetery in Los Angeles. This was followed by a celebration of her life in Nashville, Tennessee. Orbison died on the 23rd anniversary of her husband's death.
