= In Dreams (Roy Orbison song) =

1963 single by Roy Orbison

- Picture sleeve for "In Dreams" 45 RPM single

Single by Roy Orbison

from the album In Dreams
- B-side: "Shahdaroba"
- Published: February 13, 1963 Acuff-Rose Publications, Inc.
- Released: February 1963
- Recorded: January 4, 1963
- Studio: RCA Victor Studio B, Nashville
- Length: 2:48
- Label: Monument
- Songwriter: Roy Orbison
- Producer: Fred Foster

Roy Orbison singles chronology
"Working for the Man" (1962)	"In Dreams" (1963)	"Falling" (1963)

Official audio
- "In Dreams" on YouTube

"In Dreams" is a song composed and sung by the singer Roy Orbison. An operatic ballad of lost love, it was released as a single on Monument Records in February 1963. It became the title track of the album In Dreams, released in July of the same year. The song has a unique through-composed structure in seven movements in which Orbison sings through two octaves, beyond the range of most singers.

The song peaked on the Billboard Hot 100 charts at number 7, and charted in the United Kingdom for five months while Orbison toured with the Beatles. It gained notability again in 1987 when Orbison released a re-recorded anthology of his greatest hits; the year prior, director David Lynch had used the song provocatively in his film Blue Velvet, helping to revive interest in Orbison's music. The theme of the song was interwoven in similar compositions throughout his tenure as a musician; as a result, several collections of Orbison's music share the title of the song. Rolling Stone listed "In Dreams" at number 319 of their "500 Greatest Songs of All Time" in 2012.

== Background ==
In 1956, Roy Orbison was signed to Sun Records, the Memphis-based label that launched rockabilly legends such as Elvis Presley and Carl Perkins. Orbison's first releases reflected that style, including "Ooby Dooby", "Go! Go! Go!", and a song he wrote for the Everly Brothers about his future wife, "Claudette". Orbison found marginal success at Sun Records, but felt that his talents were not being employed appropriately because he was made to sing twelve-bar rock standards with heavy guitars and drums.

In 1960, when he moved to Monument Records, Orbison's style changed to what he became known for the rest of his career. With "Only the Lonely", co-written with Joe Melson and recorded by Bill Porter, Orbison's songs turned to introspective and plaintive ballads fully employing his powerful three-octave vocal range, backed by larger and more intricate arrangements. A recurring musical theme in many of Orbison's songs is a climax represented by a raw, emotionally vulnerable confession sung in an "eerily high falsetto", according to author Peter Lehman.

Orbison was an atypical performer; while many rock and roll concerts were accompanied with frenetic performances onstage, Orbison rarely moved. k.d. lang, who later sang "Crying" with him in a duet, wrote in 2004: "It wasn't like Elvis: It wasn't like your loins were on fire or anything like that. It's more like Roy was a private place to go — a solace or a refuge." Monument Records founder Fred Foster said of him, "He used such intricate, beautiful melodies. He brought a kind of baroque, classical style to pop music."

== Composition ==
Orbison later claimed that "In Dreams" came to him while he was sleeping, as many of his songs did. He often heard music while asleep, with a radio disc jockey announcing that it was Elvis Presley's new song. Orbison was half-awake when he imagined "In Dreams", and thought, "Boy that's good. I need to finish that. Too bad things don't happen in my dreams." When he woke up the next morning, he wrote the song in twenty minutes.

Like many of Orbison's songs, "In Dreams" rejects the typical song structure of rock music. It begins like a lullaby with minimal acoustic guitar strums, with Orbison introducing the listener to "a candy-colored clown they call the sandman" half-spoken and half-sung in a Sprechgesang fashion. The sandman puts him to sleep, and Orbison begins singing about dreams of his lover. Drums pick up the rhythm to follow the lyrics further into his subconscious, and a piano joins as the lyrics recount how Orbison spends time with her in his dreams, accompanied by breathy backup singers. Orchestra strings counter his melody, with the effect of representing a singing voice in themselves.

Orbison's voice rises as he wakes up to find his lover gone. The climax is a powerful crescendo, as he cries "It's too bad that all these things / Can only happen in my dreams", and the resolution follows his voice from falsetto to the final note an octave below as he sings "Only in dreams / In beautiful dreams", as the other performers conclude with him abruptly. The song never repeats a section; in two minutes and forty-eight seconds, it moves through seven distinct through-composed movements.

== Reception and legacy ==
The tormented narrative of [Orbison's] 1963 hit "In Dreams" veers unsettlingly between melancholy teenage romance and morbid adult obsession... Hearing his distinctive, plaintive voice sing, "I can't help it! I can't help it!" meant recognizing the real possibility that neither could you. Echoes of ranchera music offer bittersweet counterpoint from the lulling intro, through the aching verses to a finish that just seems to evaporate.

— Robert Goldstein, National Public Radio (2011)

"In Dreams" was recorded at RCA Studio B in Nashville on January 4, 1963, and released later the same month. "In Dreams" peaked at number 7 on Billboard's Hot 100 and spent 13 weeks on the charts in the U.S. Cash Box described it as "a lovely, Joe Tanner ork-choral supported cha cha beat opus." During the five months the song was on the charts, Orbison replaced guitarist Duane Eddy on a tour of the UK alongside the Beatles, whom he was not aware of at the time. British promoters were wary of Orbison as a draw, not considering him conventionally attractive and noting his stillness while performing. The tour sold out in one afternoon, however. Orbison's first meeting with John Lennon was awkward, as Orbison was overwhelmed by the amount of advertising devoted to the Beatles when it was he who was supposed to headline the show. Beatlemania, however, was taking hold, and Orbison accepted that he was not the main draw of the tour, so he decided to go first on stage. On opening night, the audience reacted intensely toward Orbison's ballads, as he finished with "In Dreams". Philip Norman, a Beatles biographer, later wrote "As Orbison performed, chinless and tragic, the Beatles stood in the wings, wondering how they would dare to follow him". After demanding Orbison play for double the time he was scheduled, the audience then screamed for a fifteenth encore, which Lennon and Paul McCartney refused to allow. The two held Orbison back from returning to the stage.

A compilation of Orbison's most successful songs was re-recorded in January 1986 and released in 1987 under the title In Dreams: The Greatest Hits. Its release followed the release of David Lynch's film Blue Velvet, which featured "In Dreams" prominently. Orbison was astonished and at first upset by the use of the song in Blue Velvet. In the film, murderous psychopath Frank Booth (Dennis Hopper) is obsessed with the song, which he calls "Candy Colored Clown", and demands it be played repeatedly. In one scene it is lip-synced by his crony Ben (Dean Stockwell), making Booth alternately tearful and enraged. Later, Booth threatens Jeffrey Beaumont (Kyle MacLachlan) and beats him unconscious while the song plays from his car stereo and Dorothy Vallens (Isabella Rossellini) begs him to stop. Lynch later stated, "it is a beautiful song and it was written by Roy ... Those lyrics, that feel meant something to him. And it just so happened that a song in a certain situation could mean something else. And the way that Frank Booth used that song in two different places, it is just kind of unbelievable. But I can see why Roy was upset because for him it meant a third thing."

Orbison did not know of or authorize the use of the song in Blue Velvet, but it proved beneficial to his career, which had stalled in the 1970s. BAM magazine called the song "the emotional epicenter of the film". Orbison biographer Ellis Amburn called "In Dreams" thematically appropriate in Blue Velvet because it implies that dreaming that is preferable to waking, and suggests that power and control is the true theme of the song rather than lost love. The film made the song a cult favorite, and after seeing Blue Velvet several times, Orbison came to appreciate its use of the song. Orbison re-recorded "In Dreams" again in 1987, for which Jeff Ayeroff brought Lynch to co-produce. Leslie Libman directed a music video for this recording, featuring scenes from Blue Velvet interspersed with live-action shots of Orbison's image projected over a linen cloth blowing in the wind.

In 2010, the song was used in an opening cinematic, and at the end of the first episode, of the video game Alan Wake.

In 2022, the song was also used in the first episode of Wednesday in a scene in which Morticia and Gomez Addams sing to each other. In 2026, the song was used in the ending of season 2, episode 5 of Sugar.

While listening to the Blue Velvet soundtrack on repeat during a sleepless night, Bono of U2 became fixated on "In Dreams". After eventually falling asleep, he awoke with another song in his head, which he at first presumed to be a different Orbison tune. This became "She's a Mystery to Me", a song written by Bono and The Edge for Orbison. It appeared on Orbison's final album, Mystery Girl, released in 1989. On the same album, "In Dreams" received a companion piece, "In the Real World", written by Will Jennings and Richard Kerr. Many of Orbison's songs either address dreaming or are presented in a dreamlike style. In addition to the album released in 1963 and the re-recorded album of hits in 1987, a Canadian documentary on Orbison's life and impact on rock and roll also touched on the theme exemplified by the song; it was titled In Dreams: The Roy Orbison Story and released in 1999.

=== Weekly charts ===
Chart (1963)	Peak position
Canada (CHUM Hit Parade)	7
Ireland (IRMA)	1
UK Singles Chart	6
US Billboard Hot 100	7
US Billboard Hot R&B Singles	19
US Billboard Middle-Road Singles	3

=== Year-end charts ===
Chart (1963)	Rank
US Billboard Hot 100	49

== Bibliography ==
- Amburn, Ellis (1990). Dark Star: The Roy Orbison Story, Carol Publishing Group. ISBN 0-8184-0518-X
- Clayson, Alan (1989). Only the Lonely: Roy Orbison's Life and Legacy, St. Martin's Press. ISBN 0-312-03961-1
- Creswell, Toby (2006). 1001 Songs: The Greatest Songs of All Time and the Artists, Stories, and Secrets Behind Them, Thunder's Mouth Press. ISBN 1-56025-915-9
- Lehman, Peter (2003). Roy Orbison: The Invention of An Alternative Rock Masculinity, Temple University Press. ISBN 1-59213-037-2
- Orbison, Roy Jr. (2017). The authorized Roy Orbison. Orbison, Wesley; Orbison, Alex; Slate, Jeff (2nd ed.). New York: Center Street. ISBN 9781478976547. OCLC 1017566749.
