= Bill Porter (sound engineer) =

American audio engineer (1931–2010)

Billy Rhodes Porter
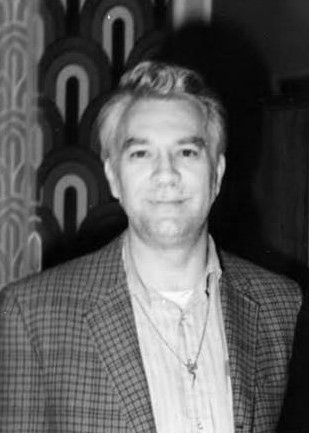
- Porter in 1972, wearing a lightning bolt pendant given to him by Elvis Presley, who was standing to his left.
- Born: June 15, 1931; St. Louis, Missouri
- Died: July 7, 2010 (aged 79); Ogden, Utah
- Occupations: Audio engineer; record producer; recording studio founder; professor
- Employer(s): RCA Victor, Columbia Records, Monument Records, Elvis Presley, University of Miami
- Known for: Pioneering the Nashville sound
- Children: 3

Billy Rhodes Porter (June 15, 1931 – July 7, 2010) was an American audio engineer and record producer who pioneered the Nashville sound and recorded stars such as Chet Atkins, Louis Armstrong, the Everly Brothers, Elvis Presley, David Bowie, Gladys Knight, Barbra Streisand, Diana Ross, Dolly Parton, Skeeter Davis, Ike & Tina Turner, Sammy Davis Jr., and Roy Orbison from the late 1950s through the 1980s. In one week of 1960, his recordings accounted for 15 of Billboard magazine's Top 100, a feat none have matched. Porter's engineering career included over 7,000 recording sessions, 300 chart records, 49 Top 10, 11 Number Ones, and 37 gold records.

Porter mixed live concert sound for Elvis Presley, at Presley’s request, from 1970 until the singer's death in 1977. As a University of Miami music professor, Porter helped create the first college program in audio engineering, and went on to teach similar courses at the University of Colorado Denver, and Webster University in St. Louis. Porter was inducted into the TEC Hall of Fame in 1992.

== Early life ==
Porter was born in St. Louis, Missouri on June 15, 1931. His father, a professional baseball player, moved the family to Tennessee when he was 10. He grew up loving jazz music and baseball, and for a time considered an athletic career starting with the minor leagues. He graduated from East Nashville High School in 1949, then served in the United States Army Reserves while studying electronics at a University of Tennessee extension program in Nashville.

== Recording career ==
=== RCA Records ===
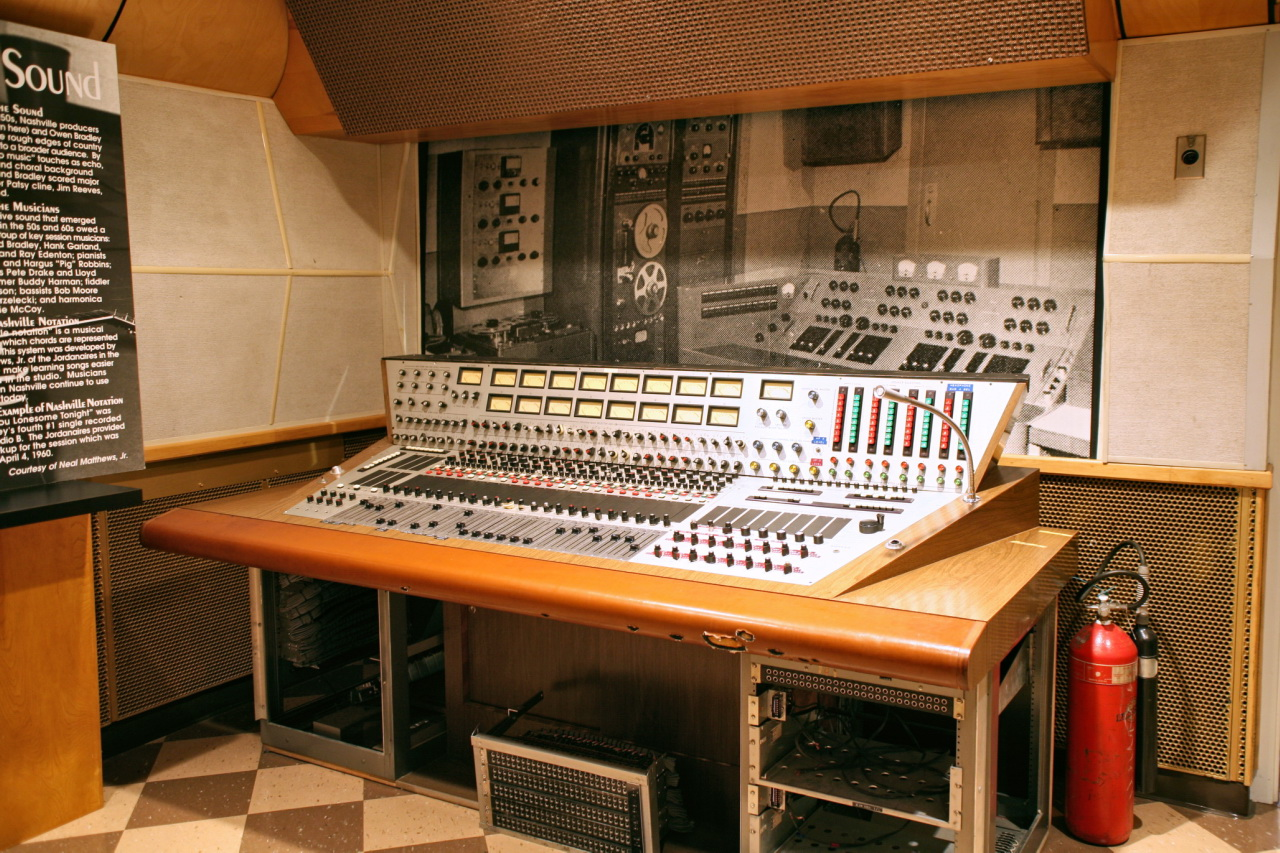
Porter's console at RCA Studio B in Nashville

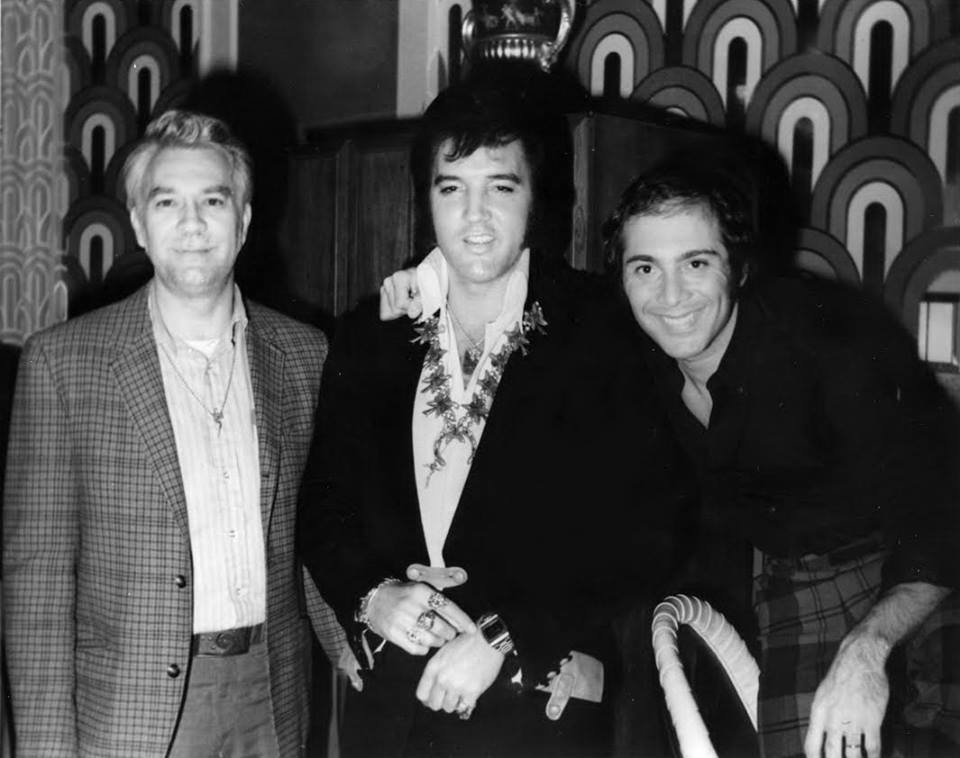
Porter with friends Elvis Presley and Paul Anka backstage at the Las Vegas Hilton on August 5, 1972

Porter began his engineering career in 1954 at WLAC-TV in Nashville, Tennessee. He mixed up to four microphones for television broadcast for $92 per week, equivalent to $1,103 today. At nearby RCA Records in 1959, the chief engineer was transferred after angering Chet Atkins, and Porter applied for the position. He was told by an RCA executive in New York City that the job would ruin his marriage, but Porter said "I can handle that." He was hired at $148 per week, equivalent to $1,635 today. He was given two weeks to learn all the equipment and how to mix up to 12 microphones for music recordings.

Shortly after starting with RCA on March 31, 1959, Porter mixed the single "Lonesome Old House" for Don Gibson; it was a crossover success in both the country music and the pop music charts, and Porter began to be requested by name. In June 1959, he mixed "The Three Bells" for the Browns, with Atkins producing and Anita Kerr arranging. While editing the master to be sent to New York for pressing, Porter accidentally hit the wrong controls on the tape recorder and stretched the tape at the beginning of the song, distorting the pitch. Without telling anyone, he spliced a different take with a good intro onto the beginning, and sent that version instead. Four decades later, Porter recalled his quick fix: "this was a need-to-know situation and I figured nobody needed to know. I had been in the business three months or something like that. You're not a good engineer until you destroy a master and hopefully live to talk about it." In July, the song went to number one on the U.S. country and pop charts, and Porter's reputation rose.

Porter served for four years as the chief engineer under guitarist and producer Atkins. Porter became the engineer big-name artists wanted to work with, and he was influential in creating the Nashville sound. Record producer Owen Bradley once asked Atkins how he got his sound, and Atkins said, "it was Bill Porter." He recorded more than 579 records that charted—49 were top 10, 11 were number one, and 37 were certified gold records. Most were recorded at RCA Studios in Nashville, where Porter was responsible for the sound. (At the time, there was only one studio, with no letter designation. In 1964, when the larger RCA Studio A was built, the original studio was renamed as "Studio B".) The studio's acoustics were problematic, with resonant room modes creating an uneven frequency response. To lessen the problem, Porter took $60 from the studio's petty cash and bought 2-by-4-foot (0.6 by 1.2 m) fiberglass acoustic ceiling panels which he and Tommy Strong, his assistant engineer, cut into triangles and hung from the ceiling at varying heights; these were called "Porter Pyramids". When Porter left RCA in late-1964, Atkins said, "the sound was never the same, never as great."

Adjacent to Studio B was a utility room containing a plate reverb device made by EMT, German makers of similar effects units installed in other recording studios around the world. The EMT 140 reverb was an electro-mechanical echo chamber used to add artificial reverberation effects to recordings. Porter arranged to have the dedicated echo room cooled down as much as possible with an air conditioner, and he adjusted the ten springs on the EMT plate to be tighter than usual, in order to feed the plate more audio signal and get a cleaner sound returning from the device. So much signal was being sent to the plate that Porter disconnected the associated VU meter so that he would not be bothered with its needle slamming against its peg. Porter related that the EMT's springs frequently broke under the increased tension, and he would have to replace them, but that the trouble was worth achieving a "brighter and fuller" echo effect.

Porter recorded nearly all of Presley's number one hits upon the singer's return from Army duty in 1960. Porter had not studied Presley's earlier recordings—he started fresh, "doing what I thought it should be." Instead of the usual microphones used by RCA, Porter chose to use a Telefunken U-47 on Presley's voice, recording several songs through the night of March 20–21, 1960, including "Stuck On You" and the ballad "Fame and Fortune". After Porter edited the two songs from the session tape, an RCA executive took the tapes from his hands to fly them to New York, where record presses were standing by and labels were pre-printed and waiting. The single "Stuck On You" with "Fame and Fortune" on the B-side was released three days later and immediately returned Presley to the number one chart position. Porter engineered "Are You Lonesome Tonight", "It's Now or Never", and other early 1960s Elvis hits.

Much of RCA's business was what they called "custom" clients—independent labels not affiliated with RCA, but willing to pay for recording sessions at the proven hit-maker studio. One outstanding client was Monument Records under producer Fred Foster, bringing his client Roy Orbison. Porter was able to create for Orbison his trademark sound, with background vocals brought nearer the foreground, beginning with "Only the Lonely". For that session, Porter discarded his standard mix style of building up from a foundation of percussion, and instead used the vocal countermelody as the foreground sound, and built the other sounds below and around it, leaving the percussion almost inaudible. The song's success cemented this mix style as Orbison's sound. Other Orbison hits recorded for Monument at RCA Nashville were "It's Over", "Running Scared" and "Oh, Pretty Woman". Boots Randolph's "Yakety Sax" and Al Hirt's "Java" are other Monument recordings that Porter engineered at RCA.

By October 1960, Porter was pulling in so many non-RCA clients that RCA decided to emphasize that side of the business. RCA Records placed a full-page advertisement in Billboard's Country & Western section declaring that he and his assistant, Tommy Strong, were "a couple of big dialers", ready to help RCA Custom Record Sales engage more independent labels.

The atmosphere in the studio was important to Porter. He felt that the "music has to show the emotion of the artist", and he took pains to enhance the mood in the room. For the album Christmas with Chet Atkins, recorded in July 1961, Porter knew that getting a Christmas mood in the heat of summer would be difficult—he came to the studio that morning carrying all his Christmas decorations, and made the studio look the part. Years later he recalled, "when everybody came in for the session, they were in the mood."

Friction rose between Porter and RCA's personnel department regarding Porter's small publishing company which he co-founded with Anita Kerr—they said it constituted a conflict of interest. Porter argued that Atkins had his own publishing, as did others in the business, but RCA personnel told him to stop, so he decided to leave the company. RCA's legal department said they found nothing wrong with the practice, and RCA executive Steve Sholes called Porter to ask him to stay, but he determined that he did not want to be "dictated to" by personnel.

=== Columbia and Monument ===
Porter adjusting a mix in RCA's Nashville studio with Chet Atkins

Porter left RCA in November 1964 to engineer for Columbia Records in Nashville, where he stayed for six months, bringing some of his custom clients with him. He left Columbia for Monument to manage the Fred Foster Sound Studio, a Nashville recording studio located at 315 Seventh Street North that Foster had acquired from Sam Phillips. Porter found the studio's acoustic space to be superior to RCA's Studio B—it was a high-ceilinged room built to house a Masonic Lodge—but the audio equipment owned by Foster was inferior. The EMT plate was not as good for reverb effects. No top ten hits were engineered by Porter at Foster's studio.

On the advice of his agent, Wesley Rose, Orbison left Monument in mid-1965 for a more lucrative contract with MGM Records, with Rose taking over as producer. Orbison did not ask for Porter on his recording sessions, and he did not have any hit songs with MGM. Years later, Porter said that, though he really liked Orbison, the singer "never understood the engineer's contribution." It was Rose's advice to leave Monument, and he was "doing his job as a manager" to get more money, but, said Porter, "he didn't know that much about the music." Porter felt that only with himself as engineer, Fred Foster as producer and Anita Kerr as arranger was Orbison going to find the right combination.

=== Las Vegas ===
In August 1966, Porter and his family moved to Las Vegas, Nevada, to purchase United Recording of Nevada from Bill Putnam of United Western Recorders in Los Angeles. Putnam was slimming down his business and wished to sell the studio now that Wally Heider had left it. Porter's first day at the studio was September 1. At that time, United Recording of Nevada had been operating for four years and was the most prominent of the six recording studios in Las Vegas, but it had problems with its equipment, radio frequency interference from nearby broadcast transmitters, and rumbling noises generated by Union Pacific freight trains passing the building. Porter made recordings at his studio for artists such as personal friend Paul Anka, who would arrive at 2:00 am after his show and record until dawn. Other projects involved recording live shows at Las Vegas hotels, including Buddy Rich's Mercy, Mercy live album at Caesars Palace in 1968. Porter’s studio also recorded Louis Armstrong’s What A Wonderful World.

In 1969, Porter and his maintenance technicians modified the 12-input, 4-output mixing console to give it 8 outputs, and made their own 8-track tape recorder from Ampex parts. In August, Presley's producer Felton Jarvis brought the master tape for "Suspicious Minds" into United Recording so that Porter could help him with the song's unusual fade out and back in three-quarters of the way through. A bigger concern was that Jarvis wanted a horn section but there were no empty tracks left on the tape. Porter solved the dilemma by mixing the horns live in the studio as the original session tape played back, the total blend being recorded onto a stereo master. The song became a number one hit; the final one both for Porter and for Presley. Also in 1969, Porter founded Porter Industries, as a basis for engineering and electronics sales outside of his studio.

In December 1969, Presley called Porter to ask him to fix the sound for him in the main showroom at the International Hotel (renamed the Las Vegas Hilton two years later); he said he could not hear himself the last time he sang there, and a new run was scheduled for January. Porter went to see Presley's first rehearsal there, and found three stage monitors hanging 18 feet (5.5 m) high above the stage, with only one working. The hotel's engineers did not get the other two to work, so Porter had some of his own Shure Vocal Master loudspeakers brought over from the recording studio. He laid the column loudspeakers on their sides at the front lip of the stage and propped them up to aim at Presley, who was very happy with the result. Presley insisted upon having Porter mix his live show in January even though he was a recording engineer with no previous experience in live sound. Porter quickly learned about acoustic feedback during the first song, but backstage after the show, film stars and musical artists kept complimenting Presley, telling him that Porter’s concert sound was "just like the album". Porter mixed Presley's live concerts from then on. Presley paid Porter well for a touring sound engineer; a 1974 contract for nearly two weeks of touring during September–October netted Porter $2,600, an amount equivalent to $17,000 in current value. Porter recorded several of these shows in the mid-1970s, released as albums, and witnessed firsthand Presley's physical decline from drug abuse. In 1975, Presley's doctors advised him to exercise more, so he had a racquetball court built at his mansion Graceland. Porter designed and supervised the installation of a powerful high-fidelity Electro-Voice loudspeaker sound system for the racquetball court and an adjoining lounge. On tour, Porter specified the best-sounding, most roadworthy equipment that existed: he used a Midas PRO4 mixing console and UREI equalizers. The tour was supported by Clair Brothers, who supplied all the audio gear and a monitor engineer, Bruce Jackson, who designed a powerful stage monitor system for Presley's show. In August 1977, Porter was changing planes in Boston to fly to Portland, Maine, to mix a Presley concert when he received a phone call informing him that the singer had died. He attended Presley's heavily guarded funeral ceremony at Graceland. Between Presley appearances, Porter also handled sound duties for Ann-Margret in Las Vegas and on the road, under the business name Captain Audio Productions. He consulted on television specials for Ann-Margret and for Bob Hope in 1972–1973.

Porter was the first president of Vegas Music International (VMI), a record company formed in 1971 as a partnership between himself, artist manager Vic Beri, music publisher Frank Hooper, and Bob Reid of Vancouver, B.C. VMI was housed in Porter's United Recording building. The first VMI release was in December 1971—the album was To Be Free and 18 by Sandi Scott, which did not take off. Better results came soon; in the first year of business, VMI songwriter Ronnie Gaylord wrote "I Will Never Pass This Way Again", a modest success for Glen Campbell, the song covered by others including Brenda Lee, Vikki Carr and Wayne Newton, who closed his show with it at each performance. Las Vegas singer Benny Hester's first album Benny and a related single were announced by VMI in late 1972. Other artists recording with VMI included Sammy Davis Jr., Andy Williams, Sérgio Mendes and Brasil '77, Ike & Tina Turner, Gladys Knight & the Pips, Danny Thomas, Harry Belafonte, Bobby Darin and Louis Prima.

Porter was named director-at-large of the Country Music Association (CMA) in October 1972. He prepared a booklet for the organization in December, an instructional primer on sound techniques, describing microphones and their usage, loudspeaker types, audio mixers, and giving operating tips.

VMI's publishing business never scored a major hit, and Porter was frustrated by what he saw as bad business decisions forced on him by the partnership. In January 1973, he resigned. On October 14, a "mysterious fire" burned out United Recording of Nevada, including all VMI's papers, stored master tapes and cases of pressed records, and Porter lost all of the recording equipment stored inside, a total he estimated at $250,000—about $1.81 million in today's dollars. He still had his outside electronics company and he concentrated on that.

As a freelance engineer, he continued to work recording dates with famous artists including Barbra Streisand, Diana Ross and Sammy Davis Jr. By 1980, he had served as engineer on more than 7,000 recordings.

=== University of Miami ===
In 1975, Porter took a call from Jerry Milam of Milam Audio and Golden Voice Recording in South Pekin, Illinois, informing him that there was an audio engineering teaching position forming at the University of Miami's Frost School of Music. Never having graduated from college himself, Porter went to Florida to create and co-author the first college level curriculum for the discipline. Porter was their second director of recording services, heading the teaching staff and audio facilities, for the Music Engineering Technology program at the University of Miami beginning in September 1976. He continued to accept tour dates with Presley until August 1977, returning to describe the experience for his students.

In May 1981, Porter was granted tenure but in June he left because he was not happy in Florida's tropical climate. He accepted the marketing director position at a mixing console company called Auditronics, then left that to work with televangelist Jimmy Swaggart, assisting with live sound and recordings. He ended the arrangement with Jimmy Swaggart Ministries after differences arose.

=== University of Colorado and Webster University ===
Porter taught audio engineering and music history at the University of Colorado Denver in the late 1980s, living outside of Denver with his wife Charmaine, "Boots". At the Webster University School of Communications in St. Louis, Missouri, and for the university's Leigh Gerdine College of Fine Arts, Porter taught nine classes from 1999 to 2005. Porter's pioneering techniques, methodology and curriculum are still taught in many colleges and universities across the United States.

== Awards and legacy ==
In 1992, the TEC Foundation inducted Porter into their TEC Awards Hall of Fame, along with synthesizer pioneer Robert Moog and record producer Phil Ramone. Porter asked Chet Atkins to accompany him to the ceremony, but Atkins could not attend because of a prior engagement at Carnegie Hall. However, before the honor was conferred at the ceremony, a video was played of Atkins congratulating Porter, saying "you improved the echo sound tremendously and made things sound so big and so full."

Author John McClellan, biographer of Atkins, writes of Porter's golden ear:

He is considered by many to be the greatest recording engineer of all time ... Bill Porter deserves as much credit as anyone in creating the "Nashville Sound." He achieved this through his creativeness, his ability to hear sound as colors, and his skill in capturing on tape the full bloom or three dimensions of sound—width, height and depth.

In 2003, Porter won the William T. Kemper Award for Excellence in Teaching, and he was honored with a lifetime achievement award from the St. Louis chapter of the Audio Engineering Society.

Late in life, Porter said that among his favorites of his career recordings were Atkins's The Most Popular Guitar, an album recorded with lush string orchestration, and Jerry Byrd's Byrd of Paradise, recorded during Porter's stint with Monument Records. Regarding the Nashville Sound, Porter believed that it was in the people who were involved: Hank Garland, Ray Edenton, Buddy Harman, Harold Bradley, Bob Moore, Boots Randolph, Floyd Cramer, Velma Smith, Charlie McCoy, the Anita Kerr Singers, and the Jordanaires. He said, "They play perfectly together because they were like family. They did it without thinking! ... They played methodical yet simple rhythm patterns or fills. It was almost a jazz concept from the standpoint that a lot of it is in their head. If you listen to Hank Garland, you won't hear the same lick twice."

Porter's fourth wife, Mary, died while he was teaching in St. Louis. In 2004 he met Carole Smith, a native of Ogden, Utah, and he moved his belongings, including thousands of records, to Ogden in 2006 to be with her. The two married in 2006. Porter's health declined from Alzheimer's disease, and he died in a hospice near Ogden on July 7, 2010, at the age of 79. He was survived by his wife Carole, a brother and a sister, his children Nancy, a retired professor, and Gene, a prominent Las Vegas attorney and politician, and his grandchildren Sam, Marcie, Chandelle, and Weston Porter.

== Top tens ==
These songs engineered by Porter placed in the top ten in the U.S. Billboard Hot 100 chart:

Artist	Song	Year-month	Highest chart position
Louis Armstrong	"What a Wonderful World"	1968-02	1 (UK)
Bobby Bare	"500 Miles Away from Home"	1963-10	10
The Browns	"The Three Bells"	1959-08	1
The Browns	"The Old Lamp-Lighter"	1960-03	5
Floyd Cramer	"Last Date"	1960-10	2
Floyd Cramer	"On the Rebound"	1961-03	4
Floyd Cramer	"San Antonio Rose"	1961-06	8
Skeeter Davis	"End of the World"	1962-12	2
Skeeter Davis	"I Can't Stay Mad at You"	1963-09	7
The Everly Brothers	"(Till) I Kissed You"	1959-08	4
The Everly Brothers	"Cathy's Clown"	1960-04	1
The Everly Brothers	"When Will I Be Loved"	1960-06	8
The Everly Brothers	"So Sad"	1960-09	7
The Everly Brothers	"Walk Right Back"	1961-02	7
The Everly Brothers	"Ebony Eyes"	1961-02	8
The Everly Brothers	"Crying in the Rain"	1962-01	6
The Everly Brothers	"That's Old Fashioned"	1962-05	9
Connie Francis	"Together"	1961-07	6
Al Hirt	"Java"	1964-01	4
Hank Locklin	"Please Help Me, I'm Falling"	1960-05	8
Bob Luman	"Let's Think About Living"	1960-09	7
Bob Moore	"Mexico"	1961-08	7
Roy Orbison	"Only The Lonely"	1960-06	2
Roy Orbison	"Blue Angel"	1960-09	9
Roy Orbison	"Running Scared"	1961-04	1
Roy Orbison	"Crying"	1961-08	2
Roy Orbison	"Dream Baby"	1962-02	4
Roy Orbison	"In Dreams"	1963-02	7
Roy Orbison	"It's Over"	1964-04	9
Roy Orbison	"Oh, Pretty Woman"	1964-08	1
Elvis Presley	"Stuck On You"	1960-04	1
Elvis Presley	"It's Now or Never"	1960-07	1
Elvis Presley	"Are You Lonesome Tonight?"	1960-11	1
Elvis Presley	"Surrender"	1961-02	1
Elvis Presley	"I Feel so Bad"	1961-04	5
Elvis Presley	"(Marie's the Name) His Latest Flame"	1961-06	4
Elvis Presley	"Little Sister"	1961-08	5
Elvis Presley	"Good Luck Charm"	1962-03	1
Elvis Presley	"She's Not You"	1962-08	5
Elvis Presley	"Return To Sender"	1962-11	2
Elvis Presley	"(You're the) Devil in Disguise"	1963-06	3
Elvis Presley	"Crying in the Chapel"	1965-04	3
Elvis Presley	"Suspicious Minds"	1969-09	1
Jim Reeves	"He'll Have to Go"	1960-01	2
Tommy Roe	"Sheila"	1962-07	1
Ronny & the Daytonas	"G.T.O."	1964-08	4
Sue Thompson	"Sad Movies (Make Me Cry)"	1961-09	5
Sue Thompson	"Norman"	1961-12	3
Johnny Tillotson	"Poetry in Motion"	1960-10	2
Johnny Tillotson	"Without You"	1961-08	7
Johnny Tillotson	"It Keeps Right On a-Hurtin'"	1962-05	3
