= Benny Hester =

American singer (born 1948)

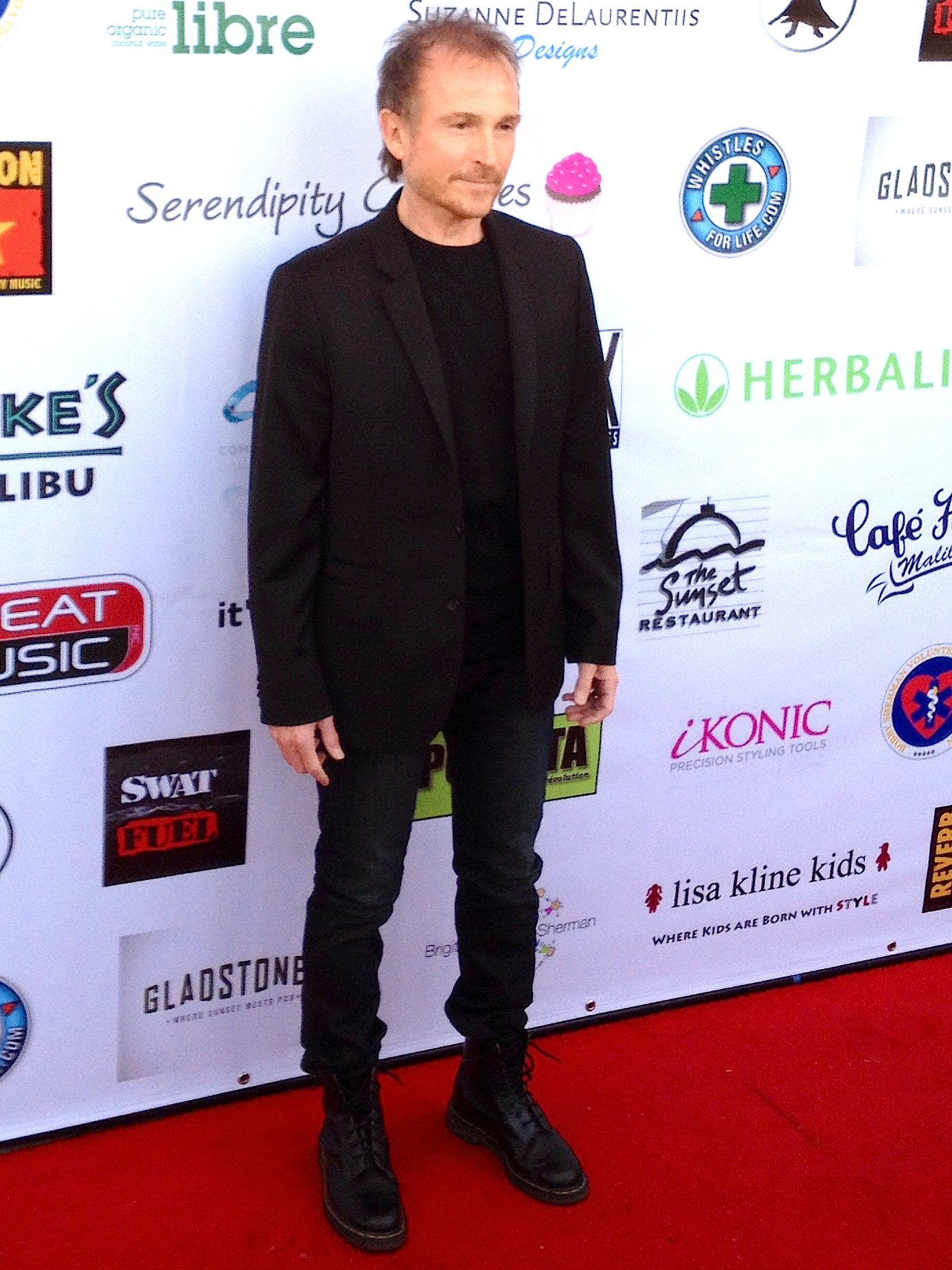
- Hester receiving 2013 Lifetime Achievement Award at Pepperdine University

Background information
- Born: Benny Ray Hester; May 3, 1948 (age 78); Waco, Texas, U.S.
- Genres: Contemporary Christian music; pop; rock; classical
- Occupations: Musician; singer; songwriter; recording artist; music producer; television producer
- Instruments: Vocals; guitar; bass guitar; keyboards
- Years active: 1965–present
- Labels: Word / Warner; Myrrh; Decca; Spirit / Sparrow; Monument; Vegas Music International (VMI); Frontline; Maranatha! Music
- Website: www.bennyhester.com

Benny Ray Hester (born May 3, 1948) is an American musician, singer, songwriter and recording artist. He is best known for his songs "When God Ran" and "Nobody Knows Me Like You", and for producing the teen sketch comedy and dance television series Roundhouse. Hester received a television Cable Ace Award for the song "I Can Dream" and a collection of nominations for writing and producing an original song for each weekly episode of Roundhouse during its four-year run.

Hester's song "When God Ran" is one of the longest-running number one songs in Contemporary Christian Music (CCM) history; it was number one for 13 weeks, and the third most successful song in the history of Word Records.

The title track from Hester's third album, "Nobody Knows Me Like You", reached number one on Christian Music Charts and became the first CCM song to break the Billboard Top 50 Adult Contemporary Chart, debuting at number 44 on November 7, 1981.

Hester's first CCM singles, "Jesus Came Into My Life" and "Be A Receiver", were breakthrough recordings for radio, blurring the lines between pop, rock and inspirational music, and becoming the first contemporary pop rock songs to be universally accepted and widely played across all Christian Radio formats. His 1978 debut album Benny Hester, re-released in 1982 as Be A Receiver, influenced the burgeoning CCM scene as the musical landscape shifted with the end of the Jesus Music era and the birth of the industry known as "Contemporary Christian Music".

== Early life ==
Benny Hester was born in Waco, Texas, the son of Benjamin F. Hester and Evelyn Hester; he has one sister and one brother. He began studying classical music at age four and continued his studies through high school. While attending Richfield High School, Hester was a founding members of the Texas pop rock band The Morticians. He sang with The Texas Boys Choir, became the youngest member of the Texas swing band Sam Weaver and The Texas Playboys, and appeared on the band's weekly television show playing alongside guests like Johnny Gimble and Ernest Tubb.

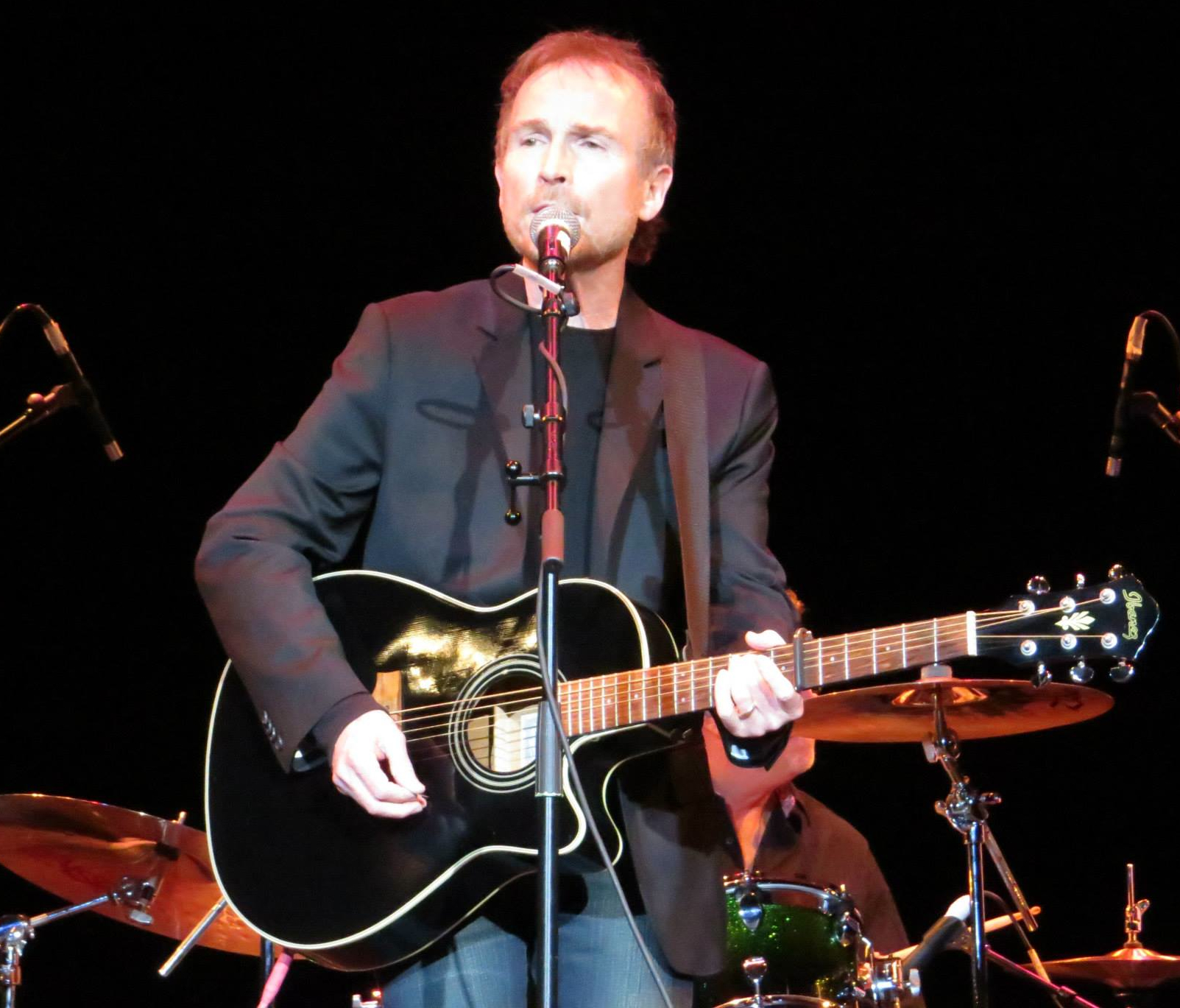
Hester performing in Malibu, California, 2013

Hester was hired to play in the stage band and orchestra for the musical Texas, and stayed with the show for two years. At the same time, with partner Steve Hilton, he founded the duo Hester & Hilton. While playing El Paso, Hester was asked to write two songs for a recording session by the group The Sojourners. In 1970, the songs, "Life Developing Slide" and "Our Way To Go", were produced by Norman Petty and recorded at his recording studio in Clovis, New Mexico.

== Career ==
in 1969, Hester moved to Las Vegas where, on a walk-through of Bill Porter's United Recording Studio, he met head recording engineer Brent Maher. Maher invited Hester to play a song and then asked for another. They became immediate friends and Maher let him sit in on the recording sessions of Ike and Tina Turner’s “Proud Mary" and The 5th Dimension's Age of Aquarius.

Hester taught music at a private music school, recorded Hester & Hilton demos with Maher at United Recording and, with Maher, formed a jingle agency, MusAd. They created, for example, the song for Hickory Farms Of Ohio, and the slogan for the Las Vegas Review-Journal. Maher produced Hester's first two albums, Benny..., and his first CCM album for Billy Ray Hearn's Sparrow Records, Benny Hester. Hester had become a Christian while attending an evangelical rally; his spiritual awakening resulted in the song "We All Know He's Coming", recorded with Elvis Presley’s TCB Band. It was the TCB band which played on Benny..., however the finished masters and packaged albums were lost in the fire that destroyed United Recording. Hester's first album was never released but a remastered version, made from Hester's promotional copy of the original, was released on February 19, 2016. A track from the album, "No the End is Not Near" was featured in the fifth season of the HBO show Girls.

"Benny Hester’s classic Nobody Knows Me Like You is the very best Adult Contemporary pop album in the history of Christian Music! Most CCM albums were not really “current,” commercial vehicles. They appealed to a pop market, but were not actually purely pop music for the day. But NKMLY was in a class all by itself. All the while the CCM market was discovering they had a treasure in Benny Hester the artist, who, over the years, has not only delivered memorable songs, but actual classics that changed and shaped the CCM landscape. Most artists would be honored to have one song that could be listed amongst the greatest in the history of the genre, while Hester has a handful! Long before he made a mockery of radio chart records with “When God Ran,” he made a very potent career of not just brilliant hits, but overwhelming good albums within his genre. Borrowing liberally from the hit music makes of the late 70s and early 80s (Hall & Oates, Christopher Cross, Bee Gee’s, Elton John), Hester mastered his songwriting craft early and never slowed down. He was driven to be a recognized artist, all the while he was driven to express his faith in original and honest ways."

— David Lowman, Salem Communications, October 2011

Hester went on to release songs and albums, and perform thousands of concerts. His recording of his song “When God Ran” is the longest running number one song in Contemporary Christian Music history, spending 13 weeks at number one on Christian Radio and topping both the AC and CHR Charts. When another single from the same album, "Secret Thoughts", made it to number one on the Rock Charts, Hester had three simultaneous chart toppers, a feat which had never been achieved in Christian music. “When God Ran” was the number one most played Christian Adult Contemporary radio hit of 1986, and number three for the decade. “When God Ran” continues to be recorded by artists in many genres; a version recorded by The Kingsmen took the number one spot on the Southern Gospel Charts in February 2009 and was nominated as Gospel Music Song Of The Year.

=== Television and legal issues ===
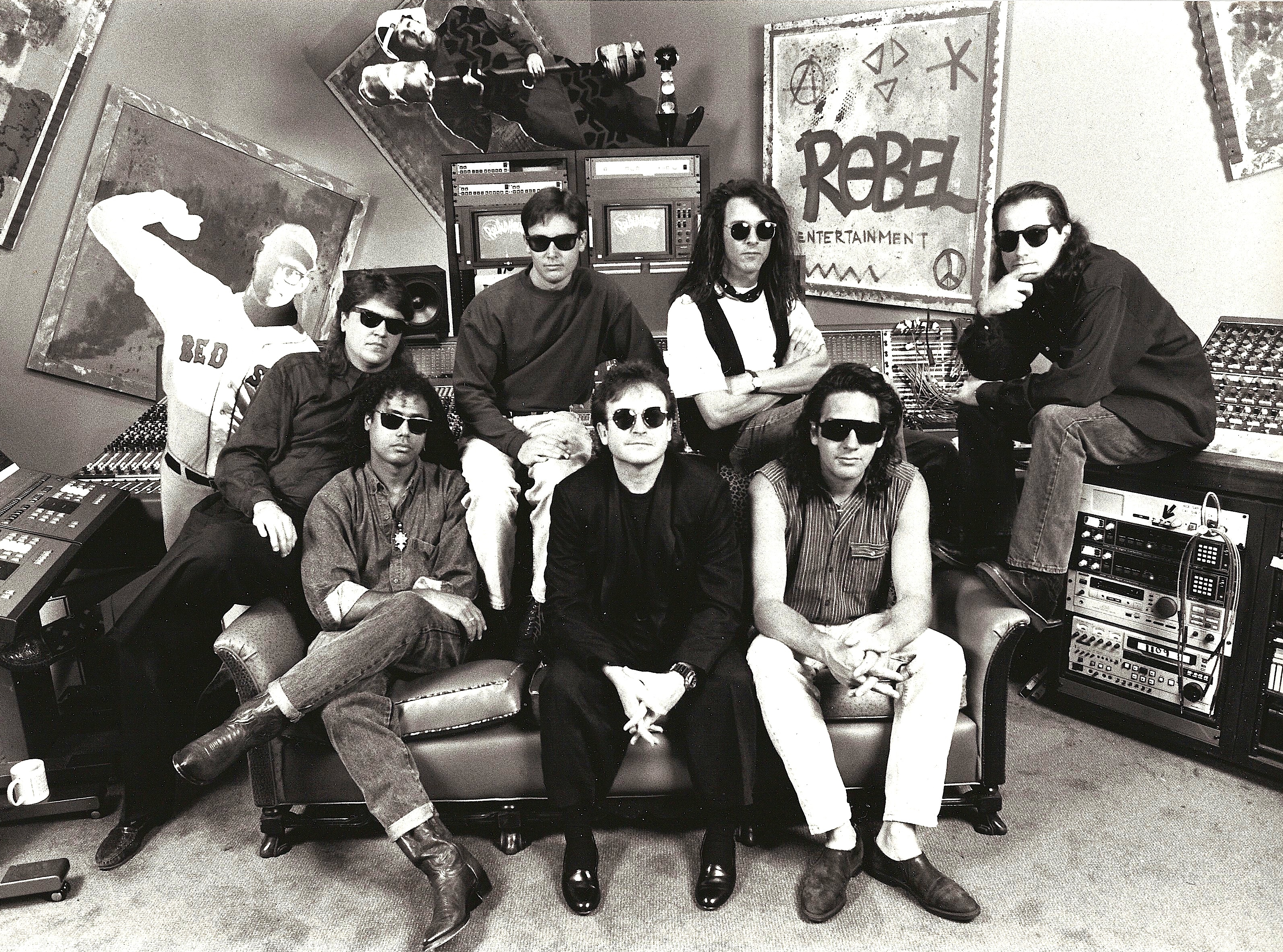
Hester with the Roundhouse band and recording engineers, Universal Studios, FL and CBS Studio Center, 1992–1996

From 1992 to 1996 Hester was Co-Executive Producer, Music Producer/Musical Director and Songwriter for the award-winning Nickelodeon/MTV series Roundhouse. He was nominated for seven songwriting and music producer awards, winning a CableACE Award for “I Can Dream” and, for “Can’t Let Go”, a Hollywood Foreign Press Association Youth In Film Award in the Best Original Song for Television category. He also received three Cable Ace nominations for best Variety Special or Series as Co-Executive Producer of the show. The 12-member cast of Roundhouse received the award for Outstanding Ensemble Cast in a Youth Series or Variety Show from the Hollywood Foreign Press Youth In Film Awards.

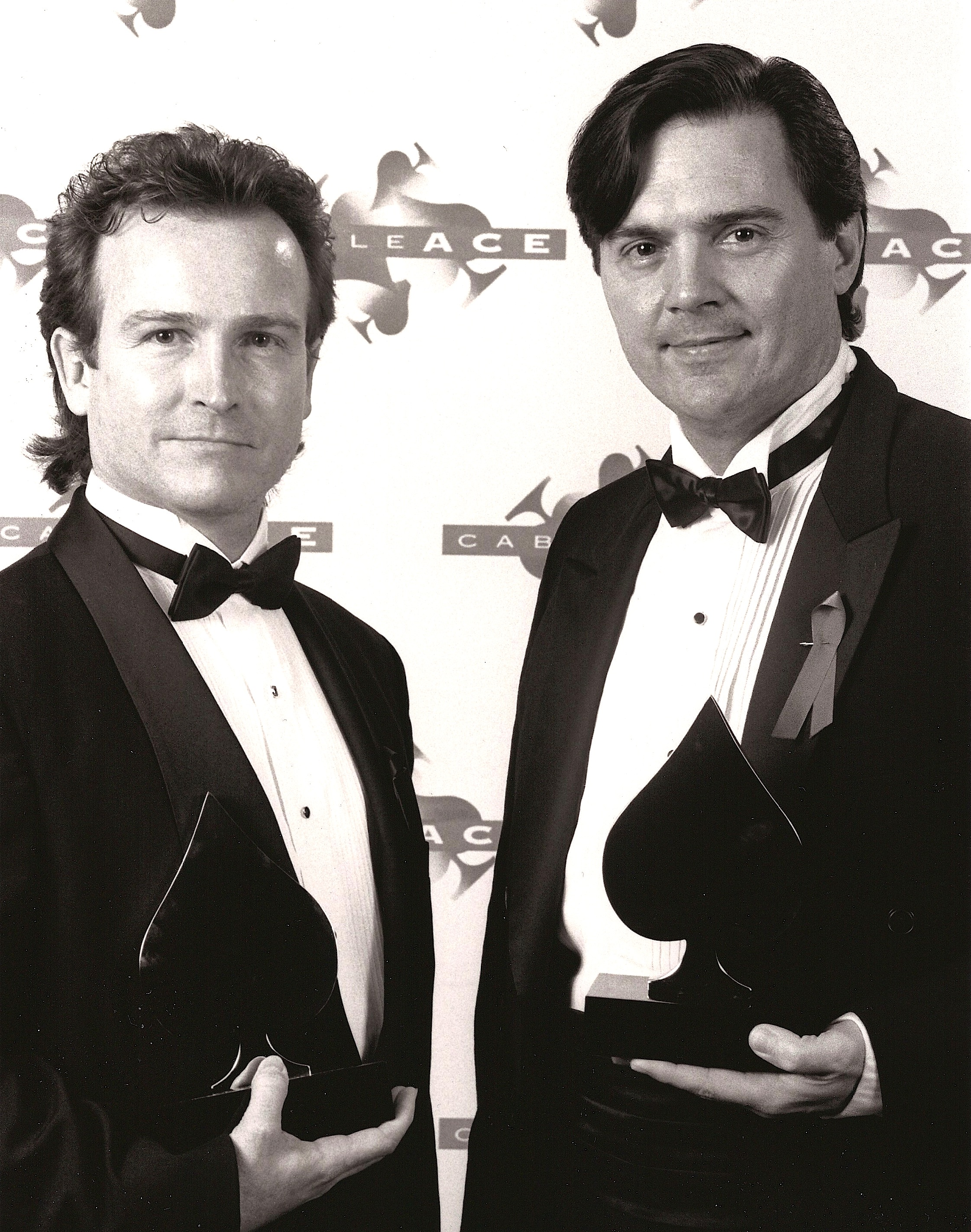
Hester receiving a Cable Ace Award for Original Song, "I Can Dream", with co-writer Sheffield, 1993

Hester and record producer Howard Benson prepared the first Roundhouse cast album for release on Irving Azoff's Giant Records (Warner Music Group). The album contained six Cable Ace-nominated tunes, including "I Can Dream". Nickelodeon blocked the album, and withheld approval of the use of its name in association with the 30-city Roundhouse concert tour. The Disney Channel, under the leadership of former Nickelodeon employees, jumped ahead of Nickelodeon in music-driven television for the tween/teen market, eventually surpassing them in viewer ratings.

Following a 2001 pitch to the Disney Channel, by Roundhouse producers, of the show Rock and Roland, in which a junior high boy was a "normal kid by day, rock star by night”, and after the producers provided additional scenes and a plan for marketing the music from the show through Disney's Hollywood Records, the Disney Channel’s Rich Ross and Adam Bonnett publicly took credit for the success of Disney’s lucrative franchise Hannah Montana. A 2007 complaint filed against Disney claimed that Rock and Roland was misappropriated by Disney and produced under the name Hannah Montana. In 2008, Disney settled the legal claim a month before the trial was to begin.

== Personal life ==
Hester is married to producer Rita Hester who, with her ex-husband Buddy Sheffield, created Roundhouse.

== Discography ==
- Benny Hester, 1978 (re-released as Be A Receiver in 1983
- Nobody Knows Me Like You, 1981
- Legacy, 1983
- Benny From Here, 1985
- Through the Window, 1987
- Personal Best, 1988
- Perfect, 1989
- United We Stand / Divided We Fall, 1990

=== Singles ===
- "The Painter" / "Malcombe", 1972
- "We All Know He's Comin'" / "Love Never Dies", 1972
- "Good Night, Good Day" / "Country Boy", 1975
- "Jamaica Way" / "Melody Man", 1978
- "Nobody Knows Me Like You" / "Step By Step", 1981
- "Melody Man", 1983
- "Legacy", 1983
- "Bring Me Through" / Nobody's Listening", with Leslie Phillips, 1983
- "To Fill Our Empty Hearts", 1985
- "Hold Me" / "Back To Basics", 1985
- "When God Ran" / "Secret Thoughts", 1985
- "Remember Me", 1986
- "The More I Enter In", 1987

== Awards & nominations ==
- 2013 Lifetime Achievement Award in Contemporary Christian Music – Pepperdine University, Malibu Music Awards
- CableACE Award for Best Original Song: "I Can Dream", for Roundhouse
- Three CableACE Award nominations for Best Variety Special or Series, Co-Executive Producer: Roundhouse
- Ollie Award – Prestigious Recognition for Excellence in Television Programming for America's Children, American Center for Children's Television, Co-Executive Producer: Roundhouse
- Hollywood Foreign Press Youth In Film Award for Best Original Song: "Can't Let Go", for Roundhouse
- Hollywood Foreign Press Youth In Film Award for Outstanding Ensemble Cast in a Youth Series or Variety Show, Co-Executive Producer, for Roundhouse
- Grammy nomination: Nobody Knows Me Like You
- GMA Dove Award nomination: "When God Ran"
