= Poetry in Motion (song) =

Single by Johnny Tillotson

from the album Johnny Tillotson's Best
- B-side: "Princess Princess"
- Released: 1960
- Genre: Rock and roll
- Length: 2:14
- Label: Cadence (US); London (UK)
- Songwriters: Mike Anthony and Paul Kaufman
- Producer: Archie Bleyer

Johnny Tillotson singles chronology
"Earth Angel" (1960)	"Poetry in Motion" (1960)	"Jimmy's Girl" (1961)

"Poetry in Motion" is a song recorded by Johnny Tillotson and released on Cadence Records in September 1960.

== Background ==
The song was written by Paul Kaufman (1930–1999) and Mike Anthony (1930–1999), who said that the inspiration for it came from looking up from their work and seeing a procession of young ladies from a nearby school pass by on the sidewalk outside each afternoon.

Bill Porter supervised the recording session in Nashville, Tennessee, which featured saxophonist Boots Randolph, pianist Floyd Cramer and bassist Floyd "Lightning" Chance. An alternative version, with King Curtis on saxophone, was recorded some weeks earlier and published by Bear Family Records in 2011.

On the Billboard Hot 100, "Poetry in Motion" peaked at No. 2 in November 1960, kept out of the No. 1 spot by "Georgia on My Mind" by Ray Charles.

In the UK Singles Chart, the record reached No. 1 in January 1961, and also made the charts on reissue in 1979.

== Chart positions ==
Chart (1960–1963)	Peak position
Argentina b/w "Cutie Pie"	1
Australia (Kent Music Report)	5
Belgium (Ultratop 50 Flanders)	9
Belgium (Ultratop 50 Wallonia)	46
Canada (CHUM Chart)	6
Netherlands (Single Top 100)	14
New Zealand	1
Norway (VG-lista)	4
US Billboard Hot 100	2
US Billboard R&B Singles	27
U.K. Singles Charts	1
West Germany (GfK)	38

== Cover versions ==
- The song was covered by Swedish pop group Ola & the Janglers in 1966 and went to No. 1 in the Swedish voted chart "Tio i Topp" but only reached No. 7 in the sales chart "Kvällstoppen".

== See also ==
- List of number-one singles from the 1960s (UK)
