= Kenny Lynch =

British actor and musician (1938–2019)

Kenny Lynch OBE
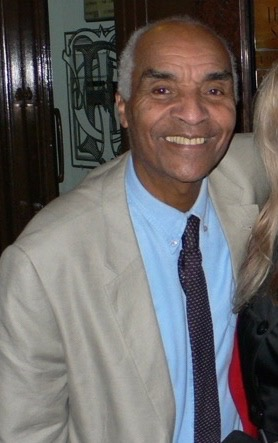
- Lynch in 2010

Background information
- Born: Kenneth Lynch; 18 March 1938; Stepney, London, England
- Died: 18 December 2019 (aged 81) Oxfordshire, England
- Genres: Rock and roll, pop
- Occupations: Singer; songwriter; entertainer; actor
- Instruments: Vocals
- Years active: 1960–2019
- Labels: His Master's Voice, Satril Records

Kenneth Lynch, OBE (18 March 1938 – 18 December 2019) was an English singer, songwriter, entertainer, and actor. He appeared in many variety shows in the 1960s. At the time, he was among the few Black singers in British pop music. He was appointed an OBE in the 1970 New Year Honours list.

== Early life ==
Lynch was born in Stepney, East London, in 1938, where he grew up on Cornwall Street, the youngest of 11 children. His parents were Oscar and Amelia (nee Spring) his father, a merchant navy seaman was from Barbados, who later worked as a stoker at Beckton Gas Works. His mother was British, of mixed race-heritage, of Afro-Caribbean and English descent. He made his first public appearance when he was 12, with his sister Gladys (stage name Maxine Daniels) who was a jazz singer of some note.

Lynch attended Farrance Street school. After leaving school at 15, he worked various jobs. In 1957, he began his national service in the Royal Army Service Corps. He was the regimental featherweight boxing champion. After demobilisation, while working in a Stepney pub as a barman and singer, further engagements led to dance band performances at Soho night clubs, where Shirley Bassey and agent Jean Lincoln saw him perform. This led to a recording contract with HMV.

== Career ==
Before Lynch had several UK hit singles in the early 1960s, he released "Twist Me Pretty Baby" with Bert Weedon in 1962 (His Master's Voice-45 POP 989); the label's credit reads "Shouts by Kenny Lynch". Two top ten hits were "Up on the Roof", in January 1963; and "You Can Never Stop Me Loving You", in August 1963. He was also known for his single release of "Misery", which had been turned down by Helen Shapiro, the first cover version of a Beatles song to be released, although it failed to chart.

In early 1963, Lynch had been on the same bill as the Beatles on the group's first British tour; John Lennon and Paul McCartney wrote "Misery" in January 1963, in the hopes that the artist on top of the bill, Helen Shapiro, would record it. Shapiro's record producer turned it down, but Lynch took the composition and gave it a much more pop-oriented arrangement than the Beatles would use when they recorded "Misery" themselves on their debut album, Please Please Me. Whilst on a coach with the Beatles (on tour with Helen Shapiro), Lynch reportedly offered to help them write a song, but quickly became frustrated and criticised their ability to compose music – at the time Lennon and McCartney were writing "From Me to You". Years later he appeared on the album cover of Wings' 1973 album Band on the Run, along with other celebrities.

Much of Lynch's material was self-written, but he also covered songs by writers of the Brill Building.

Lynch also wrote songs for others including actress Linda Thorson, Small Faces' No. 3 UK hit "Sha-La-La-La-Lee" and Cilla Black's No. 5 UK hit "Love's Just a Broken Heart", in collaboration with American songwriter Mort Shuman. "You'd Better Believe It" (co-written with Jerry Ragavoy) and "Sorry She's Mine", which also appeared on the Small Faces' 1966 debut album, were both Lynch works.

Lynch took part in the A Song for Europe contest in 1962 with the song "There's Never Been A Girl", but failed to win through to represent the UK in the Eurovision Song Contest. Lynch had more success in 1978, as a songwriter and producer. That year, his song "Don't Bother to Knock", written for the group Midnight, placed second in the contest. The same year he wrote '"Love Crazy", the theme used for Carry On Emmannuelle, and "You Can't Fight It", the vocal version of the theme to the John Carpenter film Assault on Precinct 13. In the mid-1960s he ran his own record shop, the Kenny Lynch Record Centre in Walker's Court, Soho.

In the early 1980s, Lynch formed a songwriting partnership with tennis player Buster Mottram.

Lynch appeared on television programmes including Blankety Blank, with Les Dawson as host, Celebrity Squares, Mooncat & Co., Room at the Bottom, Bullseye and Curry and Chips. He also appeared on Z-Cars, The Sweeney, Till Death Us Do Part and Treasure Hunt.

Lynch completed the London Marathon in 1982, played in several charity football matches and took part in Michael Parkinson's 'Celebrity Cricket' fundraisers. In 2018, Lynch performed on a concert tour with Jimmy Tarbuck and Anita Harris, as well as appearing in ITV's Last Laugh in Vegas. Lynch was acknowledged as astute in business and had his own music publishing company and record shop. He later owned a North London restaurant. Lynch survived the 1971 BBC Payola scandal, and later had his own Sunday morning show on BBC Radio Oxford in the 1980s until he was sacked for risqué comments.

== Personal life ==
Lynch was a supporter of West Ham United F.C. as well as West Ham, Boxing Club, and he had regularly played football for Showbiz XI team, alongside Tommy Steele, later playing cricket with Michael Parkinson's team. He competed in several pro-celebrity golf tournaments with Jimmy Tarbuck and Bruce Forsyth. Lynch, was survived by his two daughters.

=== Death ===
The death of Lynch was first announced on X formerly Twitter, by his family, he died from prostate cancer in Nettlebed, Oxfordshire on the 18 December 2019, aged 81. His sister Gladys, predeceased him in 2003.

== Discography ==
=== Chart singles ===
Year	Single	Chart positions
Year	Single	UK
1960	"Mountain of Love"	33
1962	"Puff (Up in Smoke)"	33
1962	"Up on the Roof"	10
1963	"You Can Never Stop Me Loving You"	10
1964	"Stand by Me"	39
1964	"What Am I to You"	37
1965	"I'll Stay by You"	29
1983	"Half the Day's Gone and We Haven't Earned a Penny"	50

== Filmography ==
=== Film ===
Year	Title	Role	Notes
1960	The Criminal	Black Prisoner	Uncredited
1963	Just for Fun	Himself	
1965	Dr. Terror's House of Horrors	Sammy Cohen	Segment: "Voodoo"
1967	The Plank	Dustbin Lorry Driver	
1970	Carry On Loving	Bus Conductor	
1972	The Alf Garnett Saga	Himself	
1975	Dawson's Weekly	Attendant	
1978	The Playbirds	Police Doctor	
1979	Confessions from the David Galaxy Affair	Joe	

=== Television ===
Year	Title	Role	Notes
1979	The Plank	Dustman	TV short
2007	The Riddle	Shotgun Ronnie White	TV movie

== See also ==
- Popcorn (music style)
