= It Keeps Right On a-Hurtin' =

Studio album by Johnny Tillotson
- Released: June 1962
- Recorded: January–May 1962
- Genre: Pop
- Label: Cadence

Johnny Tillotson chronology
This Is Johnny Tillotson (1961)	It Keeps Right On a-Hurtin' (1962)	Talk Back Trembling Lips (1963)

Professional ratings
Review scores
Source	Rating
New Record Mirror	4/5 stars
The Encyclopedia of Popular Music	3/5 stars

It Keeps Right On a-Hurtin' is an album by Johnny Tillotson. It was released to capitalize on the success of Tillotson's hit of the same name. The album was arranged by Archie Bleyer and had vocal accompaniment by the Anita Kerr Singers and the Jordanaires. Charlie McCoy plays the harmonica on four tracks.

== Critical reception ==
The album received a positive critical reception upon its release. Cashbox believed it had a "pleasant session of pop andcountry items," and that "The chanter goes through his musical paces with enough authority and superior range and pitch to please a wide variety of record buyers." New Record Mirror gave it a four-star rating, writing that "Johnny seems all broken up in all the tracks," and that "many a lass will find a tear trickling down her cheek as she listens to the set."

== Chart performance ==
The album debuted on the Billboard Top LPs chart in the issued dated July 21, 1962, and remained on the chart for 31 weeks, peaking at number eight.

== Track listing ==
=== Side 1 ===
1. "It Keeps Right On a-Hurtin'" (Johnny Tillotson)
2. "Lonely Street" (Carl Belew, Kenny Sowder, W.S. Stevenson)
3. "I'm So Lonesome I Could Cry" (Hank Williams)
4. "Funny How Time Slips Away" (Willie Nelson)
5. "I Fall to Pieces" (Hank Cochran, Harlan Howard)
6. "What'll I Do" (Irving Berlin)

=== Side 2 ===
1. "I Can't Help It (If I'm Still in Love with You)" (Hank Williams)
2. "Take Good Care of Her" (Arthur Kent, Ed Warren)
3. "Four Walls" (George Campbell, Marvin Moore)
4. "Send Me the Pillow You Dream On" (Hank Locklin)
5. "Fool #1" (Kathryn R. Fulton)
6. "Hello Walls" (Willie Nelson)

== Charts ==
Chart (1962)	Peak position
US Top LPs (Billboard)	8

Singles

Year	Single	Chart	Position
1962	"It Keeps Right On a-Hurtin'"	US Billboard Hot 100	3
1962	"It Keeps Right On a-Hurtin'"	US Billboard R&B singles	6
1962	"It Keeps Right On a-Hurtin'"	US Billboard Hot C&W Sides	4
1962	"It Keeps Right On a-Hurtin'"	UK Singles Chart	31
1962	"Send Me the Pillow You Dream On"	US Billboard Hot 100	17
1962	"Send Me the Pillow You Dream On"	US Billboard Hot C&W Sides	11
1962	"Send Me the Pillow You Dream On"	UK Singles Chart	21
1962	"What'll I Do?"	US Billboard Bubbling Under the Hot 100	106
1962	"I'm So Lonesome I Could Cry"	US Billboard Hot 100	89
1962	"I Can't Help It (If I'm Still in Love with You)"	US Billboard Hot 100	24
1962	"I Can't Help It (If I'm Still in Love with You)"	UK Singles Chart	41
