= Puff (Up in Smoke) =

Single by Kenny Lynch
- B-side: "Happy That’s Me"
- Released: 1962
- Genre: Pop
- Label: His Master's Voice
- Songwriter(s): Bill Giant; Bernie Baum; Florence Kaye

"Puff (Up in Smoke)" is a song and single written by Bill Giant, Bernie Baum and Florence Kaye, performed by Kenny Lynch and released in 1962.

English comedian and entertainer, Lynch who died in 2019, had eight chart hits. "Puff (Up in Smoke)" was the second hit, making number 33 in the UK Singles Charts in 1962 staying in the charts for 6 weeks.
