= Out of My Mind (Johnny Tillotson song) =

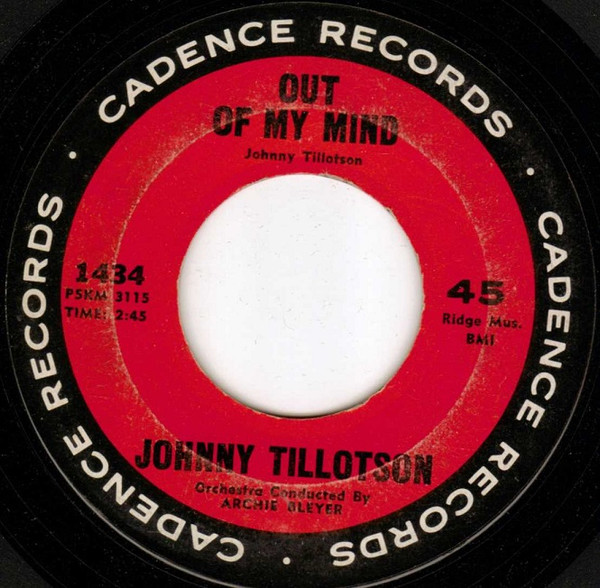

Single by Johnny Tillotson
- B-side: "Empty Feelin'"
- Released: 1963
- Recorded: November 19, 1962
- Genre: Country pop
- Length: 2:45
- Label: Cadence
- Songwriter: Johnny Tillotson

Johnny Tillotson singles chronology
"I Can't Help It (If I'm Still in Love with You)" (1962)	"Out of My Mind" (1963)	"You Can Never Stop Me Loving You" (1963)

"Out of My Mind" is a song written and sung by Johnny Tillotson, which he released in 1963. The song spent 10 weeks on the Billboard Hot 100 chart, peaking at No. 24, while reaching No. 11 on Billboard's Middle-Road Singles chart, No. 28 on Canada's CHUM Hit Parade, No. 34 on the UK's Record Retailer chart, and No. 23 on the UK New Musical Express chart.

== Chart performance ==
Chart (1963)	Peak position
Canada - CHUM Hit Parade	28
UK New Musical Express	23
UK Record Retailer	34
US Billboard Hot 100	24
US Billboard Middle-Road Singles	11
US Cash Box Top 100	23
