= It Keeps Right On a-Hurtin' (song) =

"It Keeps Right On A-Hurtin'"

Single by Johnny Tillotson

from the album It Keeps Right On a-Hurtin'
- B-side: "She Gave Sweet Love To Me"
- Released: May 1962
- Genre: Country
- Length: 2:45
- Label: Cadence 1418
- Songwriter: Johnny Tillotson

Johnny Tillotson singles chronology
"Dreamy Eyes" (1961)	"It Keeps Right On A-Hurtin'" (1962)	"Send Me the Pillow You Dream On" (1962)

"It Keeps Right On a-Hurtin'" is a song written and recorded by Johnny Tillotson, which was a major hit for him in 1962. The song was nominated for a Grammy for Best Country & Western song for 1962 but lost to Burl Ives' "Funny Way of Laughing". It has been recorded by many other artists.

== Notable cover versions ==
- Bobby Darin - You're the Reason I'm Living (1963).
- Shelley Fabares - The Things We Did Last Summer (1962).
- Dean Martin - My Woman, My Woman, My Wife (1970).
- Billy Joe Royal - a single release in 1988.
- Elvis Presley - From Elvis in Memphis (1969).
- Margaret Whiting - a single release in 1968. Included in her album Pop Country (1967).
- Slim Whitman - Country Songs / City Hits (1964).
- Wanda Jackson - Encore (2021).

== Chart performance ==
=== Johnny Tillotson ===
Chart (1962)	Peak position
US Billboard Hot 100	3
US Hot Country Songs (Billboard)	4
U.S. Hot Rhythm & Blues Singles	6
Canada CHUM Chart	10
UK Singles (OCC)	31

=== Margaret Whiting ===
Chart (1968)	Peak position
US Bubbling Under Hot 100 (Billboard)	15
US Adult Contemporary (Billboard)	28

=== Billy Joe Royal ===
Chart (1988)	Peak position
US Hot Country Songs (Billboard)	17
Canadian RPM Country Tracks	15
