= You Can Never Stop Me Loving You =

Single by Kenny Lynch
- B-side: "Crazy Crazes"
- Released: Early 1963
- Genre: Pop
- Label: His Master's Voice
- Songwriters: Ian Samwell & Jean Slater

"You Can Never Stop Me Loving You"

Single by Johnny Tillotson

from the album You Can Never Stop Me Loving You
- B-side: "Judy, Judy, Judy"
- Released: 1963
- Recorded: July 1, 1963
- Genre: Pop
- Length: 2:45
- Label: Cadence
- Songwriters: Ian Samwell & Jean Slater

Johnny Tillotson singles chronology
"Out of My Mind" (1963)	"You Can Never Stop Me Loving You" (1963)	"Talk Back Trembling Lips" (1963)

"You Can Never Stop Me Loving You" is a song written by Ian Samwell and Jean Slater, and released in 1963 by Kenny Lynch. Lynch's version spent 14 weeks on the UK's Record Retailer chart, reaching No. 10.

== Johnny Tillotson recording ==
- Later in 1963, Johnny Tillotson recorded the song. Tillotson's version spent 10 weeks on the Billboard Hot 100 chart peaking at No. 18, while reaching No. 4 on Billboard's Middle-Road Singles chart, Outside the US, this version peaked at No. 1 in Germany, No. 3 in Israel, and No. 4 in Hong Kong.

== Chart performance ==
Johnny Tillotson version

Chart (1963)	Peak position
Canada – CHUM Hit Parade	12
Germany	1
Hong Kong	4
Israel – Kol Israel	3
US Billboard Hot 100	18
US Billboard Middle-Road Singles	4
US Cash Box Top 100	18
