= Maxine Daniels =

English jazz singer (1930–2003)

Maxine Daniels (born Gladys Lynch; 2 November 1930 – 20 October 2003) was an English jazz singer who achieved notability in the post-war era.

== Early life ==
Daniels was born Gladys Lynch in Stepney, London, an elder sister of singer and entertainer, Kenny Lynch. She was descended paternally from a Caribbean seaman whose own ancestry traced back to African communities that settled around London’s Victoria Docks in the early 20th century. Her mother was English of mixed heritage from Canning Town. She was one of thirteen children.

== Career ==
Her first recognition as a singer came from winning a local talent contest, at the age of 14, in a Stepney cinema. Local recognition led to a first singing job with a semi-professional band led by a Canning Town grocer, until another talent competition organised by the Daily Sketch and sponsored by bandleader Ted Heath. A long residency (1954–56) with bandleader Denny Boyce followed at The Orchid Room in Purley. At Boyce's suggestion, she changed her stage name: through their regular Radio Luxembourg broadcasts, she gained a wider audience, and the opportunity to record for the Oriole label.

== Personal life ==
She married Charlie Daniels in 1950, and they had a daughter. Charlie died in 1988. In the late 1950s, Maxine shared a mutual attraction with actor Sean Connery, whom she met while performing at a theatre. Connery purportedly made a pass at her, but was informed she was already happily married with a daughter. Maxine Daniels died in Romford in 2003, aged 72. She was survived by her daughter and two grandsons.

== Discography ==
- "Coffee Bar Calypso" / "Cha-Cha Calypso" (Oriole, 1957)
- "A Foggy Day" / "The London I Love" (Oriole, 1957)
- "I Never Realised" / "Moonlight Serenade" (Oriole, 1958)
- "Somebody Else is Taking My Place" / "You Brought a New Kind of Love to Me" (Oriole, 1958) with Denny Boyce & His Orchestra
- "When it's Springtime in the Rockies" / "My Summer Heart" (Oriole, 1958) with Denny Boyce & His Orchestra
- "Passionate Summer" / "Lola's Heart" (Oriole, 1958)
- Pete Corrigan and His Band of Hope (CBH, 1984) featuring Maxine Daniels
- The Magic of Maxine Daniels... Every Night About This Time (Calligraph, 1986)
- A Pocketful of Dreams (Calligraph, 1987)
- From the Heart (Calligraph, 1993)
- The Memory of Tonight (Calligraph, 1996)
