= Johnny Tillotson =

American singer-songwriter (1938–2025)

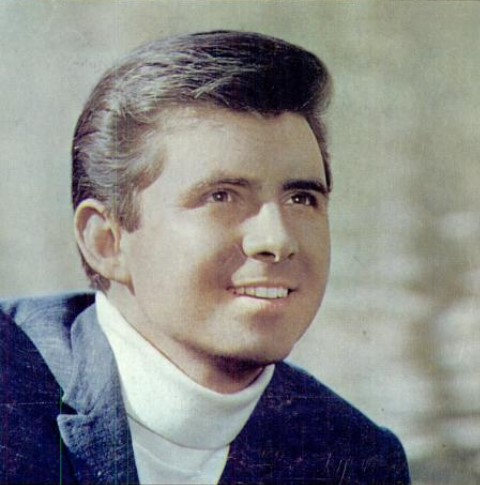
- Tillotson, c. 1965

Background information
- Born: April 20, 1938; Jacksonville, Florida, U.S.
- Died: April 1, 2025 (aged 86) Los Angeles, California, U.S.
- Genres: Country; pop
- Occupations: Singer; songwriter
- Years active: 1957–2025
- Labels: Cadence; London; Apex; MGM; Amos; Buddah; Columbia; United Artists; Reward; Atlantic
- Website: johnnytillotson.com

Johnny Tillotson (April 20, 1938 – April 1, 2025) was an American singer-songwriter. He enjoyed his greatest success in the early 1960s, when he scored nine top-10 hits on the pop, country, and adult contemporary Billboard charts, including "Poetry in Motion", the self-penned "It Keeps Right On a-Hurtin'", "Talk Back Trembling Lips", and "Without You".

== Early life ==
Tillotson was the son of Doris and Jack Tillotson, who owned a small service station on the corner of 6th and Pearl in Jacksonville, Florida; his father acted as the station's mechanic. At the age of nine, Johnny was sent to Palatka, Florida, to take care of his grandmother. He returned to Jacksonville each summer to be with his parents when his brother Dan would go to his grandmother.

== Career ==
=== 1950s ===
Johnny began to perform at local functions as a child, and by the time he was at Palatka Senior High School, he had developed a reputation as a talented singer. Tillotson became a semiregular on WJXT's McDuff Hayride, hosted by Toby Dowdy, and soon landed his own show on WFGA-TV. In 1957, while Tillotson was studying at the University of Florida, local disc jockey Bob Norris sent a tape of Johnny's singing to the Pet Milk talent contest, and he was chosen as one of six national finalists. This gave Johnny the opportunity to perform in Nashville, Tennessee, on WSM on the Grand Ole Opry, which led Lee Rosenberg, a Nashville publisher, to take a tape to Archie Bleyer, owner of the independent Cadence Records. Bleyer signed Tillotson to a three-year contract and issued his first single, "Dreamy Eyes" / "Well I'm Your Man" in September 1958. Both songs were written by Tillotson, and both made the Billboard Hot 100, "Dreamy Eyes" peaking at number 63. After graduating in 1959 with a bachelor's degree in journalism and communications, Tillotson moved to New York City to pursue his music career.

From late 1959, a succession of singles – "True, True Happiness", "Why Do I Love You So" (recorded October 1959), and a double-sided single covering the rhythm and blues hits "Earth Angel" and "Pledging My Love" – all reached the bottom half of the Hot 100.

=== 1960s ===
His biggest success came with his sixth single, the up-tempo "Poetry in Motion", written by Paul Kaufman and Mike Anthony, and recorded in Nashville in August 1960 with session musicians, including saxophonist Boots Randolph and pianist Floyd Cramer. Released in September 1960, it went to number two on the Hot 100 in the U.S. and number one on the UK's Record Retailer chart in January 1961. It sold over one million copies, and was awarded a gold disc by the Recording Industry Association of America. On Bleyer's advice, Tillotson focused on his recording career, also appearing on television and being featured as a teen idol in magazines. His follow-up record, "Jimmy's Girl", reached number 25 in the U.S. charts and number 43 in the UK; after that, "Without You" returned him to the U.S. top 10, but failed to make the UK Singles Chart. He toured widely with Dick Clark's Cavalcade of Stars.

Early in 1962, Tillotson recorded a song he wrote, "It Keeps Right on a-Hurtin'", inspired by the terminal illness of his father. It became one of his biggest hits, reaching number three on the U.S. pop chart, and was the first of his records to make the country music chart where it peaked at number four. It earned his first Grammy nomination, for Best Country and Western Recording, and was covered by over 100 performers, including Elvis Presley and Billy Joe Royal, whose version was a country hit in 1988. Tillotson then recorded an album, It Keeps Right on a-Hurtin', on which he covered country standards including Hank Locklin's "Send Me the Pillow You Dream On" and Hank Williams' "I Can't Help It (If I'm Still in Love with You)", which also became hit singles. He continued to record country-flavored and pop songs in 1963, and "You Can Never Stop Me Loving You" and the follow-up, the Willie Nelson song "Funny How Time Slips Away", both made the Hot 100.

With the demise of the Cadence label, he formed a production company and moved to MGM Records, starting with his version of the recent country-charted number-one song by Ernest Ashworth, "Talk Back Trembling Lips", which reached number seven in January 1964 on Billboard's Hot 100. He earned his second Grammy nomination for "Heartaches by the Number", nominated for Best Vocal Performance of 1965, which reached number four on the Easy Listening chart. He also sang the theme song for the 1965 Sally Field television comedy Gidget. While his fortunes waned with changing musical tastes in the late 1960s, he continued to record before moving to California in 1968. Besides concerts and recording, he appeared in several films, such as in the 1963 British music film Just for Fun; the 1966 camp comedy The Fat Spy starring Jayne Mansfield; the Japanese movie Namida Kun Sayonara, named after his Japanese hit of the same name; and the 1976 made-for-TV film The Call of the Wild.

=== 1970s–2010s ===
In the 1970s, he recorded for the Amos, Buddah, Columbia, and United Artists labels. He appeared in concert, appearing in theaters, at state fairs and festivals, and in major hotels in Las Vegas and elsewhere.

In 1984, he charted briefly on Billboard's Hot Country Singles chart with "Lay Back in the Arms of Someone" on Reward Records, and during the '80s, his hits in Southeast Asia had him appear in Thailand, Singapore, Malaysia, Australia, and New Zealand on a regular basis, with tours in Japan and Hong Kong. In 1990, he signed with Atlantic Records and released "Bim Bam Boom", which received significant airplay on country music stations.

In the 1990s, Tillotson recorded several Christmas songs with Freddy Cannon and Brian Hyland for the Children's Miracle Network, produced by Michael Lloyd. He also recorded with Tommy Roe and Brian Hyland, again for Michael Lloyd for Rudolph the Red-Nosed Reindeer: The Movie (1998), "We Can Make It".

After a decade-long absence, in 2010, Tillotson released a single titled "Not Enough", a tribute to the military, police, fire, and all uniformed personnel of the United States.

On March 23, 2011, Tillotson was inducted into the Florida Artists Hall of Fame, which is the highest honor that Florida bestows on an artist. Their plaques are on permanent display in the Florida State Capitol.

== Personal life and death ==
On May 19, 1991, his 22-year-old daughter Kelli, who was a model and lived in Encinitas, California, died in a traffic accident in Parker, Arizona.

Tillotson died on April 1, 2025, from complications of Parkinson's disease, as was announced by fellow singer Fabian Forte on his Instagram. He was 86.

== Recognition ==
- 2014: Inducted into the America's Pop Music Hall of Fame
- 2014: BrandLaureate International Legendary Award
- 2011: Inductee into the Florida Artists Hall of Fame
- 2008 : Inductee into the Hit Parade Hall of Fame
- 2006: Alumnus of Distinction College of Journalism and Communications University of Florida Gainesville

== Discography ==
=== Studio albums ===
| Year | Album | Peak positions | |
| Year | Album | US BB | US CB |
|---|---|---|---|
| 1959 | This Is Johnny Tillotson | — | — |
| 1960 | Johnny Tillotson (EP) | — | — |
| 1962 | It Keeps Right On a-Hurtin' | 8 | 10 |
| 1963 | You Can Never Stop Me Loving You | — | 71 |
| 1964 | Talk Back Trembling Lips | 48 | 31 |
| 1964 | The Tillotson Touch | — | 87 |
| 1964 | She Understands Me | 148 | — |
| 1965 | That's My Style | — | — |
| 1965 | Johnny Tillotson Sings | — | — |
| 1966 | No Love at All | — | — |
| 1966 | The Christmas Touch | — | — |
| 1966 | Johnny Tillotson Sings Tillotson | — | — |
| 1967 | Here I Am | — | — |
| 1969 | Tears on My Pillow | — | — |
| 1970 | Johnny Tillotson | — | — |
| 1977 | Johnny Tillotson | — | — |

=== Compilations ===
| Year | Album | Peak positions | |
| Year | Album | US | AUS |
|---|---|---|---|
| 1962 | Johnny Tillotson's Best | 120 | — |
| 1968 | The Best of Johnny Tillotson | — | — |
| 1972 | The Very Best of Johnny Tillotson | — | — |
| 1977 | Greatest | — | — |
| 1984 | Scrapbook | — | — |
| 1986 | 20 Greatest Hits | — | 96 |
| 1990 | All the Early Hits – and More!!!! | — | — |
| 1995 | Poetry in Motion: Best of Johnny Tillotson | — | — |
| 1998 | Country Hits Collection | — | — |
| 2001 | 25 All-Time Greatest Hits | — | — |
| 2003 | Sings Love Songs & Standards | — | — |
| 2011 | Outtakes | — | — |
| 2013 | Poetry in Motion | — | — |
| 2013 | Johnny Tillotson's Best | — | — |
| 2014 | It Keeps Right On a-Hurtin' | — | — |
| 2014 | Travelin' on Foreign Grounds | — | — |
| 2015 | It Keeps Right On a-Hurtin | — | — |
| 2025 | Stereo Singles Collection | — | — |

=== Singles ===
| Year | Single | Peak chart positions | | | | | | | | Album |
| Year | Single | US | US Cashbox | US R&B | US Country | US AC | CAN CHUM / RPM | CAN Country | UK | Album |
|---|---|---|---|---|---|---|---|---|---|---|
| 1958 | "Dreamy Eyes" / "Well I'm Your Man" (from Words and Music by Johnny Tillotson EP) | 63; 87 | — — | — — | — — | — — | — — | — — | — — | Johnny Tillotson's Best |
| 1958 | "I'm Never Gonna Kiss You" (with Genevieve) | — | — | — | — | — | — | — | — | Non-album single |
| 1959 | "True True Happiness" b/w "Love Is Blind" (non-album track) | 54 | 49 | — | — | — | — | — | — | Johnny Tillotson's Best |
| 1960 | "Why Do I Love You So" b/w "Never Let Me Go" (non-album track) | 42 | 31 | — | — | — | 25 | — | — | Johnny Tillotson's Best |
| 1960 | "Earth Angel" / "Pledging My Love"* | 57; 63* | 61; 73 | — — | — — | — — | — — | — — | — — | Johnny Tillotson's Best |
| 1960 | "Poetry in Motion" b/w "Princess Princess" | 2 | 2 | 27 | — | — | 6 | — | 1 | Johnny Tillotson's Best |
| 1961 | "Jimmy's Girl" b/w "(Little Sparrow) His True Love Said Goodbye" | 25 | 24 | — | — | — | 29 | — | 43 | Johnny Tillotson's Best |
| 1961 | "Without You" b/w "Cutie Pie" | 7 | 12 | — | — | — | 15 | — | — | Johnny Tillotson's Best |
| 1962 | "Dreamy Eyes" (re-issue) b/w "Well I'm Your Man" (from Words and Music by Johnny Tillotson EP) | 35 | 46 | — | — | — | 14 | — | — | Johnny Tillotson's Best |
| 1962 | "It Keeps Right On a-Hurtin'" b/w "She Gave Sweet Love to Me" (non-album track) | 3 | 5 | 6 | 4 | — | 10 | — | 31 | It Keeps Right On a-Hurtin' |
| 1962 | "Send Me the Pillow You Dream On" / | 17 | 14 | — | 11 | 5 | 37 | — | 21 | It Keeps Right On a-Hurtin' |
| 1962 | "What'll I Do" | 106 | — | — | — | — | — | — | — | It Keeps Right On a-Hurtin' |
| 1962 | "I'm So Lonesome I Could Cry" / | 89 | 94 | — | — | — | — | — | — | It Keeps Right On a-Hurtin' |
| 1962 | "I Can't Help It (If I'm Still in Love with You)" | 24 | 29 | — | — | 8 | 23 | — | 41 | It Keeps Right On a-Hurtin' |
| 1963 | "Out of My Mind" b/w "Empty Feelin'" (from You Can Never Stop Me Loving You) | 24 | 23 | — | — | 11 | 28 | — | 34 | Non-album single |
| 1963 | "You Can Never Stop Me Loving You" b/w "Judy, Judy, Judy" | 18 | 18 | — | — | 4 | 12 | — | — | You Can Never Stop Me Loving You |
| 1963 | "Talk Back Trembling Lips" b/w "Another You" | 7 | 7 | — | — | 6 | — | — | — | Talk Back Trembling Lips |
| 1963 | "Funny How Time Slips Away" b/w "A Very Good Year for Girls" | 50 | 62 | — | — | 16 | — | — | — | It Keeps Right On a-Hurtin' |
| 1964 | "I'm a Worried Guy" / | 37 | 38 | — | — | — | 39 | — | — | Talk Back Trembling Lips |
| 1964 | "Please Don't Go Away" | 112 | 122 | — | — | — | — | — | — | Talk Back Trembling Lips |
| 1964 | "I Rise, I Fall" b/w "I'm Watching My Watch" | 36 — | 44; 125 | — — | — — | — — | — — | — — | — — | The Tillotson Touch |
| 1964 | "Worry" b/w "Sufferin' from a Heartache" | 45 | 45 | — | — | 5 | 36 | — | — | The Tillotson Touch |
| 1964 | "She Understands Me" b/w "Tomorrow" | 31 | 29 | — | — | 4 | 25 | — | — | She Understands Me |
| 1965 | "Angel" b/w "Little Boy" (from She Understands Me) | 51 | 53 | — | — | — | 33 | — | — | Johnny Tillotson Sings |
| 1965 | "Then I'll Count Again" b/w "One's Yours, One's Mine" (from Johnny Tillotson Sings) | 86 | 67 | — | — | — | – | — | — | That's My Style |
| 1965 | "Heartaches by the Number" b/w "Your Mem'ry Comes Along" | 35 | 32 | — | — | 4 | 14 | — | — | That's My Style |
| 1965 | "Our World" b/w "(Wait Till You See) My Gidget" | 70 | 54 | — | — | — | 23 | — | — | Johnny Tillotson Sings |
| 1966 | "Hello Enemy" b/w "I Never Loved You Anyway" (from Johnny Tillotson Sings) | 128 | 104 | — | — | — | — | — | — | Non-album single |
| 1966 | "Me, Myself and I" b/w "Country Boy" | — | — | — | — | — | — | — | — | That's My Style |
| 1966 | "No Love at All" b/w "What Am I Gonna Do" (from Talk Back Trembling Lips) | — | — | — | — | — | — | — | — | No Love at All |
| 1966 | "Open Up Your Heart" b/w "More Than Before" | — | — | — | — | — | — | — | — | Non-album single |
| 1966 | "Christmas Is the Best of All" b/w "Christmas Country Style" | — | — | — | — | — | — | — | — | The Christmas Touch |
| 1967 | "Tommy Jones" b/w "Strange Things Happen" (from Johnny Tillotson Sings) | — | 91 | — | — | — | — | — | — | Here I Am |
| 1967 | "Don't Tell Me It's Raining" b/w "Takin' It Easy" | — | — | — | — | — | — | — | — | Here I Am |
| 1967 | "You're the Reason" b/w "Countin' My Teardrops" (from That's My Style) | — | — | — | 48 | — | — | 24 | — | The Best of Johnny Tillotson |
| 1968 | "I Can Spot a Cheater" b/w "It Keeps Right On a-Hurtin'" (from The Best of Johnny Tillotson) | — | — | — | 63 | — | — | — | — | Non-album singles |
| 1968 | "Why So Lonely" b/w "I Haven't Begun to Love You Yet" | — | — | — | — | — | — | — | — | Non-album singles |
| 1968 | "Letter to Emily" b/w "Your Memory Comes Along" | — | — | — | — | — | — | — | — | Non-album singles |
| 1969 | "Tears on My Pillow" b/w "Remember When" | 119 | 98 | — | — | — | 94 | — | — | Tears on My Pillow |
| 1969 | "Joy to the World" b/w "What Am I Living For" | — | — | — | — | — | — | — | — | Tears on My Pillow |
| 1969 | "Raining in My Heart" b/w "Today I Started Loving You Again" | — | — | — | — | — | — | — | — | Tears on My Pillow |
| 1970 | "Susan" b/w "Love Waits for Me" | — | — | — | — | — | — | — | — | Non-album singles |
| 1970 | "I Don't Believe in If Anymore" b/w "Kansas City, Kansas" | — | — | — | — | — | — | — | — | Non-album singles |
| 1971 | "Apple Bend" b/w "Star Spangled Bus" (non-album track) | 127 | — | — | — | — | — | — | — | Johnny Tillotson (1970) |
| 1971 | "Welfare Hero" b/w "The Flower Kissed the Shoes That Jesus Wore" | — | — | — | — | — | — | — | — | Johnny Tillotson (1970) |
| 1971 | "Make Me Believe" b/w "The Flower Kissed the Shoes That Jesus Wore" | — | — | — | — | — | — | — | — | Johnny Tillotson (1970) |
| 1973 | "Your Love's Been a Long Time Comin'" b/w "Apple Bend" | — | — | — | — | — | — | — | — | Johnny Tillotson (1970) |
| 1973 | "If You Wouldn't Be My Lady" b/w "The Sunshine of My Life" | — | — | — | — | — | — | 77 | — | Non-album singles |
| 1973 | "I Love How She Needs Me" b/w "So Much of My Life" | — | — | — | — | — | — | — | — | Non-album singles |
| 1974 | "Till I Can't Take It Anymore" b/w "A Sunday Kind of Woman" | — | — | — | — | — | — | — | — | Non-album singles |
| 1975 | "Big Ole Jean" b/w "Mississippi Lady" | — | — | — | — | — | — | — | — | Non-album singles |
| 1975 | "Right Here in Your Arms" b/w "Willow County Request Line" | — | — | — | — | — | — | — | — | Non-album singles |
| 1976 | "Summertime Lovin'" b/w "It Could Have Been Nashville" | — | — | — | — | — | — | — | — | Johnny Tillotson (1977) |
| 1977 | "Toy Hearts" b/w "Just an Ordinary Man" | — | — | — | 99 | — | — | — | — | Johnny Tillotson (1977) |
| 1979 | "Poetry in Motion" (re-issue) b/w "Princess Princess" | — | — | — | — | — | — | — | 67 | Johnny Tillotson's Best |
| 1984 | "Lay Back in the Arms of Someone" b/w "What's Another Year" | — | — | — | 91 | — | — | — | — | Non-album singles |
| 1990 | "Bim Bam Boom" b/w "I Was Born a Dreamer" | — | — | — | — | — | — | — | — | Non-album singles |
| 2010 | "Not Enough" | — | — | — | — | — | — | — | — | Non-album singles |
"—" denotes items which were not released in that country or failed to chart.

== Video releases ==
- Best of Johnny Tillotson (2003) K-tel
- Rock'n Roll Legends (2005) MVD Visual
- Johnny Tillotson Sings His All-time Greatest Hits (2006) Varese Sarabande
