= Dreamy Eyes =

Single by Johnny Tillotson

from the album Johnny Tillotson's Best
- B-side: "Well I’m Your Man"
- Released: September 1958 (original); November 1961 (re-release)
- Recorded: August 21, 1958
- Genre: Pop
- Length: 2:19
- Label: Cadence
- Songwriter: Johnny Tillotson

Johnny Tillotson singles chronology
"Dreamy Eyes" (1958)	"I'm Never Gonna Kiss You" (1958)

"Dreamy Eyes" is a song written and sung by Johnny Tillotson, which he recorded on August 21, 1958, and released later that year. The song was Tillotson's debut single. "Dreamy Eyes" spent 9 weeks on the Billboard Hot 100 chart, peaking at No. 63.

The song was re-released in 1961, and reached No. 35 on the Billboard Hot 100 chart, spending an additional 14 weeks on the chart, making it a total of 23 weeks the song spent on the Billboard Hot 100. In January 1962, the song reached No. 14 on Canada's CHUM Hit Parade.
