= Fort Worth Academy of Fine Arts =

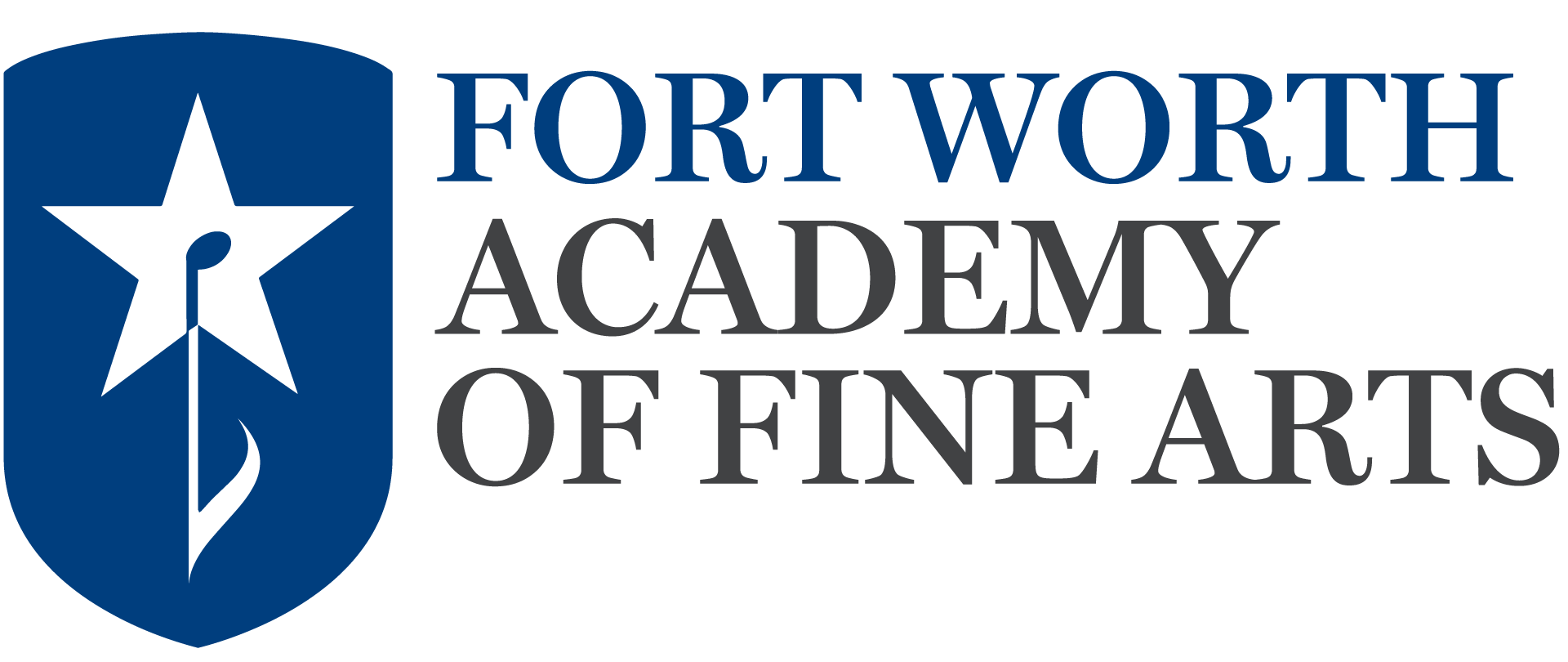

Location
- 3901 S. Hulen St. Fort Worth, Texas 76109; United States; 32°41′28″N 97°23′34″W

Information
- School type: Public arts, charter
- Established: 2001
- Sister school: Texas School of the Arts
- Principal: Amber Ledbetter
- Faculty: 67 (as of 2025-2026)
- Grades: 3 through 12
- Enrollment: 654
- Hours in school day: 7.75 hours per day
- Colors: Red, Navy
- National ranking: 91st in Gold Medal Schools
- Yearbook: FWAFA's Marquee
- Affiliation: Texas Center for Arts + Academics, Texas School of the Arts, Texas Boys Choir, Singing Girls of Texas
- Website: www.artsacademics.org/academies/fwafa

The Fort Worth Academy of Fine Arts (FWAFA) is a fine arts public arts charter school in Fort Worth, Texas, founded in 2001 by the Texas Boys Choir, Inc. The school serves grades 3 through 12 and emphasizes the arts. Its programs include dance, choral music, theater, and visual arts. It is also the home of the Texas Boys Choir.

It has been the starting ground for many successful artists including those that have been seen on Broadway, as well as the silver screen. However, it is not only for the arts, but also has an exemplary educational program. Students have been accepted into higher education institutions across the United States in not only fine arts majors but other academic majors. The school features an intensive academic curriculum. High school teachers encourage the student body to participate in AP classes and testing and academic activities such as UIL and National Honor Society, alongside their arts activities. Some notable academic classes include AP Language and Composition, AP Literature and Composition, AP Biology, AP US History, AP Spanish, and AP World History.

== Ensembles, groups, and honor societies ==
FWAFA is home to a variety of ensembles representing the different arts at the school. Among these are:

- The Texas Boys Choir (a choir program founded in 1946; separate entity from the school)
- The Singing Girls of Texas (a girls choir program consisting of 9-12th graders)
- The Academy Men's Ensemble (a boys choir program consisting of 9-12th graders)
- The Children's Choir of Texas (an elementary choir consisting of 5-6th graders)
- The Academy Musical Theater Company (a musical theater ensemble consisting of 10-12th graders)
- The Academy Dance Company (a select dance company consisting of 9-12th graders)
- Dance Company II (a semi-select dance company consisting of 7-12th graders)
- Junior Dance Company (a semi-select dance company consisting of 3-6th graders)

In addition to the listed ensembles, there are several classes that represent their art but are not considered a performing group. Among these are:

- Advanced Theatre
- Elementary Choir (several different choirs formed by grade of those who are not in CCT)
- Musical Theatre
- Technical Theatre
- Music Composition
- Advanced Dance
- Visual Art Classes
- Piano (independent study for advanced students)
- Dance Classes

FWAFA also hosts chapters of several different honor societies. These must be applied for and the grades listed in the parenthesis are only the eligible students. Among these are:

- National Honor Society (11-12th grade)
- Tri-M Music Honor Society (9-12th grade)
- International Thespian Society (9-12th grade)
- National Art Honor Society (9-12th grade)
- National Dance Honor Society (9-12th grade)
- Science National Honor Society (AP Biology Students)
- National Junior Honor Society (8th grade)
- Junior International Thespian Society (8th grade)
- National Junior Art Honor Society (7-8th grade)
