= Without You (Johnny Tillotson song) =

Single by Johnny Tillotson
- B-side: "Cutie Pie"
- Released: 1961
- Genre: Pop
- Length: 2:06
- Label: Cadence
- Songwriter: Johnny Tillotson

Johnny Tillotson singles chronology
"Jimmy's Girl" (1961)	"Without You" (1961)	"Dreamy Eyes" (1962)

"Without You" is a song written and sung by Johnny Tillotson, which he released in 1961. The song spent 13 weeks on the Billboard Hot 100 chart peaking at No. 7, while reaching No. 15 on Canada's CHUM Hit Parade, and No. 5 in Hong Kong.

The song was ranked No. 37 on Billboard's end of year "Hot 100 for 1961 - Top Sides of the Year".

== Chart performance ==
Chart (1961)	Peak position
US Billboard Hot 100	7
Canada - CHUM Hit Parade	15
Hong Kong	5
