= Wild Christmas =

Album by Mae West

Studio album by Mae West
- Released: November 1966
- Recorded: 1966
- Genre: Christmas music, rock and roll
- Label: Dagonet Records
- Producer: David Mallet

Mae West chronology
Way Out West (1966)	Wild Christmas (1966)	Great Balls of Fire (1972)

Professional ratings
Review scores
Source	Rating
AllMusic	2/5 stars
Records.Christmas	6/10 stars

Wild Christmas is a rock and roll Christmas album released in 1966 by film star Mae West.

== Overview ==
The record features only eight songs, an unusually short album for the period when most long-playing records had eleven or twelve songs on them. Among the tracks are Christmas songs made famous by Elvis Presley ("Santa Claus Is Back in Town", "Santa Bring My Baby Back (To Me)"), "Santa Baby", popularised by Eartha Kitt as well as a not specifically Christmas tune "From Me to You" by The Beatles. West inserted her own catchphrases into the songs' lyrics for parody effect, for example: "If I have to choose between two evils, I'm gonna pick the one I never tried before" or "A man under the mistletoe is worth two under the tree". The record was produced by David Mallet who also created her quintessential rock album Way Out West in the same year.

The LP was recorded and released not long after West's surprisingly successful rock and roll debut Way Out West for Tower Records. 'Wild West', however, was released by the small label Dagonet Records and did not enter the charts. It was re-released as Mae in December in 1980 with a re-arranged track listing and different artwork. In 2009, it re-appeared as Christmas Classics in digital format, retaining the 1980 track listing but again sporting a different cover image. Wild Christmas never received individual CD re-issue, but in 2013, it was bundled on a single CD with The Fabulous Mae West. In 2015, the album was eventually released onto digital music platforms retaining the original track listing and cover image.

== Track listing ==
=== Original release ===
Side A

1. "Merry Christmas Baby" (Lou Baxter, Johnny Moore) – 1:54
2. "Santa Baby" (Joan Javits, Philip Springer) – 3:06
3. "Santa Come Up to See Me" (David Allen, Dennis Trerotola) – 2:28
4. "Put the Loot in the Boot Santa" (Quint Benedetti) – 2:12

Side B

1. "Santa Claus Is Back in Town" (Jerry Leiber and Mike Stoller) – 2:46
2. "My New Year's Resolution" (David Mallet, Mae West) – 2:45
3. "Santa Bring My Baby Back to Me" (Aaron Schroeder, Claude Demetrius) – 2:34
4. "With Love from Me to You" (John Lennon, Paul McCartney) – 2:19

=== Mae in December / Christmas Classics ===
Side A

1. "Santa Come Up to See Me" – 2:29
2. "Santa, Bring My Baby Back to Me" – 2:36
3. "Merry Christmas, Baby" – 1:57
4. "Santa Claus Is Back in Town" – 2:48

Side B

1. "Put the Loot in the Boot, Santa" – 2:14
2. "With Love from Me to You" – 2:21
3. "Santa Baby" – 3:09
4. "My New Year's Resolution" – 2:47
