= Way Out West (Mae West album) =

Studio album by Mae West
- Released: 1966
- Genre: Rock
- Label: Tower
- Producer: David Mallet

Mae West chronology
The Fabulous Mae West (1956)	Way Out West (1966)	Wild Christmas (1966)

Professional ratings
Review scores
Source	Rating
AllMusic	2/5 stars

Way Out West is a rock and roll album recorded and released in June 1966 by film star Mae West. The LP consisted mainly of covers of popular songs of the day. Teen rock band Somebody's Chyldren provided instrumental accompaniment. The album was released by Tower Records, a subsidiary of Capitol Records, and on Stateside Records in the UK.

The album was a surprise success, peaking at #116 on Billboard's Hot 200 LP chart although there were no original hit singles from the collection. West was 72 at the time, making her the oldest woman to ever have a solo album on the Hot 200 chart, a long-held record broken in 2011 by Wanda Jackson, then 73, with her The Party Ain't Over release. Dolly Parton broke that record at age 77 with her 2023 album Rock Star.

Way Out West was never released on CD, but in 2009 the album was made available in digital format.

== Track listing ==
Side A

No.	Title	Writer(s)	Length
1.	"Treat Him Right"	Roy Head, Mya Simille, Dick Rivers	2:11
2.	"When a Man Loves a Woman"	Calvin Lewis, Andrew Wright	2:30
3.	"You Turn Me On"	Ian Whitcomb	2:56
4.	"Shakin' All Over"	Johnny Kidd	3:00
5.	"If You Gotta Go, Go Now"	Bob Dylan	2:50
6.	"Lover, Please Don't Fight"	Allen Terry	2:10

Side B

No.	Title	Writer(s)	Length
1.	"Day Tripper"	Lennon–McCartney	2:39
2.	"Nervous"	Ian Whitcomb	2:25
3.	"Twist and Shout"	Phil Medley, Bert Berns	2:35
4.	"Boom Boom"	John Hooker	3:20
5.	"Mae Day"	Quinn	1:36

== Charts ==
Chart (1966)	Peak position
US Billboard 200	116
