= Catherine Was Great =

1944 play by Mae West

- Written by: Mae West
- Characters: Catherine II of Russia
- Genre: The present day, and 1762
- Setting: 18th century Russia

Premiere
- Date: August 2, 1944
- Place: Shubert Theatre

Catherine Was Great is a 1944 play written by and starring Mae West. The play was a dramatisation of the life of the Russian monarch Catherine the Great. The play ran for 191 performances and then went on tour. It was produced by theater and film impresario Mike Todd and used costumes by Tony Award winning designer Mary Percy Schenck.

West had originally attempted to develop her script as a film in 1938 and 1939 before its appearance on Broadway. The development of West film may have been hampered by the success of Marlene Dietrich's 1934 film of Catherine the Great's life, The Scarlet Empress. The play opened at the Shubert Theatre on 2 August 1944. Previews had been held in Philadelphia. The premier Todd only sold tickets to purchasers of American war bonds, with the opening night of the play raising $4 million (equivalent to $73,156,900 in 2025).

West's biographer, Simon Louvish, described the play as West's opportunity to finally "prove herself a great dramatic actress". West surrounded herself with an "imperial guard" of tall, muscular young actors.

West claimed to have received a psychic message from Catherine the Great "urging her to take the role seriously". West described her interpretation of Catherine's life as "a pre-incarnation of myself. A Slavic-Germanic Diamond Lil, just as low in vivid sexuality, but on a higher plane of authority". Ramona Curry in her book Too Much of a Good Thing: Mae West as Cultural Icon, contextualizes West's performance as Catherine as part of her portrayals of historically powerful women and her persona of feminine strength and power.

The critic Howard Barnes wrote that West "returned to Broadway last night, decked out like a battleship in a swimming pool" but also described the play as "incredibly boring and monotonous" and West's dramatic abilities as "more limited than ever". Louvish described West's performance as Catherine alienating her critics and audience with her "standard wide Brooklyn tones".

The play was affected by a plagiarism suit; the writers George S. George and Vadim Uraneff sued West for plagiarism for $450,000 (equivalent to $8,047,597 in 2025), as did the writers Edwin K. O'Brien and Michael Karr, who alleged that they supplied West with material on Catherine the Great in 1938. O'Brien and Karr's suit was resolved in 1948.
