= Santa Bring My Baby Back (to Me) =

1957 christmas song by Elvis Presley

"Santa, Bring My Baby Back to Me"

Song by Elvis Presley

from the album Elvis' Christmas Album
- Published: Cherry Lane Music/Gladys Music/administered by Carlin Music Corp. Rachel's Own Music administered by Minder Music.
- Released: October 15, 1957
- Recorded: September 7, 1957
- Genre: Christmas, rock and roll
- Label: RCA Victor
- Songwriters: Aaron Schroeder and Claude Demetrius

"Santa Bring My Baby Back (to Me)" is a 1957 Christmas song by Aaron Schroeder and Claude Demetrius, recorded by Elvis Presley. The song was released on the RCA Victor Elvis' Christmas Album in 1957.

== Background ==
The song, written by Aaron Schroeder and Claude Demetrius, has been a popular Christmas song during the Holiday season on radio stations for decades. The song appeared originally as part of an RCA Victor 45 EP, EPA-4108, with "Santa Claus Is Back in Town", "Blue Christmas", and "I'll Be Home for Christmas" in 1957. The EP reached No. 1 on the Billboard EP chart. The song was recorded on September 7, 1957, and features the vocal backing of the Jordanaires.

"Santa Bring My Baby Back (to Me)" was paired with "Santa Claus Is Back In Town" and was issued as a UK single concurrently with the album's release in 1957. The single reached No. 7 on the UK Singles Chart in November 1957.

== Album appearances ==
The song appeared on the original RCA Victor LP, Elvis' Christmas Album, the 1958 reissue, the 1970 RCA Camden reissue, the UK release of the Camden version, CDS 1155, the 1975 Pickwick reissue, and the 1985 RCA Special Products rerelease.

== Cover versions ==
1957 UK sheet music cover, Belinda Ltd., Southern Music, London

"Baby Come Back", a song with the same melody and similar lyrics but without any references to Santa Claus or Christmas, was one of the earliest releases of Johnny Rivers in 1958.

In the 1965 Rolling Stones documentary film Charlie Is My Darling, the song is sung impromptu by Mick Jagger and Keith Richards in a hotel lounge.

Mae West recorded the song for her 1967 Christmas album Wild Christmas. The Reverend Horton Heat recorded the song for his 2005 Christmas album We Three Kings. Eleanor Friedberger released a cover version on the 2013 compilation album Holidays Rule.

The song has also been recorded or performed by the Smithereens, the Refreshments, Jeff Healey, 45 R.P.M., Arena Venus, Kim Stockwood, Terry Buchwald, Chris Isaak, Jimmy "Orion" Ellis, Janice Hagan, Rick Saucedo, and Tony Witt. John Candy performed the song in character as drag queen/actor Divine in a Christmas-themed episode of SCTV.

Train recorded the song for their 2015 album Christmas in Tahoe.

== Sources ==
- Record Mirror UK charts for December 1957.
- Guralnick, Peter. The King of Rock 'n' Roll: The Complete 50's Masters, insert booklet. RCA 66050–2, 1992.
- Guralnick, Peter. From Nashville to Memphis: The Essential '60s Masters, insert booklet. RCA 66160–2, 1993.
- Guralnick, Peter (1994). Last Train to Memphis: The Rise of Elvis Presley. Little Brown GBR. ISBN 978-0-316-91020-0.
- Hopkins, Jerry (1971). Elvis: A Biography. ISBN 978-0-671-20973-5.
- Wolfe, Charles. Elvis Presley: If Every Day Was Like Christmas, liner notes. BMG Australia Limited, 7863664822, 1994.
