= After the Ball =

After the Ball may refer to:

== Books and plays ==
- After the Ball: Pop Music from Rag to Rock, a 1972 book by Ian Whitcomb
- After the Ball (Kirk and Madsen book) (subtitled How America Will Conquer Its Fear and Hatred of Gays in the '90s), a 1989 book by Marshall Kirk and Hunter Madsen
- After the Ball (play), a 1997 play by David Williamson
- "After the Ball" (short story), a short story by Leo Tolstoy written in 1903

== Film and television ==
- After the Ball (1897 film), a short French film directed by Georges Méliès
- After the Ball (1914 film), an American drama starring Effie Shannon and Herbert Kelcey
- After the Ball (1924 film), an American film directed by Dallas M. Fitzgerald and starring Gaston Glass and Miriam Cooper
- After the Ball (1932 film), a British comedy starring Esther Ralston and Basil Rathbone
- After the Ball (1956 film), a Woody Woodpecker short cartoon
- After the Ball (1957 film), a British biography of Vesta Tilley, starring Pat Kirkwood and Laurence Harvey
- After the Ball (2015 film), a Canadian romantic comedy-drama starring Portia Doubleday

== Music ==
- "After the Ball" (song), a popular music-hall song written in 1891 by Charles K. Harris
- "After the Ball", a self-composed song by Johnny Cash from his 1977 album The Rambler
- "After the Ball", a self-composed instrumental by Rick Wakeman from his 1977 soundtrack album White Rock
- After the Ball (musical), a British 1954 stage musical by Noël Coward
- After the Ball (album), a 1973 album by acoustic guitarist John Fahey
- After the Ball (subtitled A Treasury of Turn-of-the-Century Popular Songs), a 1974 album by Joan Morris and William Bolcom
