= Mary Percy Schenck =

American costume designer (1917–2005)

Mary Percy Schenck Cosgrove (July 16, 1917 – August 30, 2005) was an American costume designer who won the Tony Award for Best Costume Design in 1948 for her work on Ruth Goetz's The Heiress. Mainly active as a designer during the 1940s, she designed costumes for several successful Broadway plays and for operas with the Metropolitan Opera.

== Biography ==
Born Mary Percy Schenck in Jersey City, New Jersey, to Robert Percy Schenck, she was a descendant of Jacob W. Van Winkle (1727–1778) who was a lieutenant in the Continental Army during the American Revolutionary War. Trained at the Yale School of Drama, she won the Tony Award for Best Costume Design in 1948 for her work on Ruth Goetz's The Heiress. She made her Broadway debut designing costumes for Thornton Wilder's Pulitzer Prize winning drama The Skin of Our Teeth in 1942. Her other work on Broadway included Mae West's Catherine Was Great (1944), George S. Kaufman's Hollywood Pinafore, Mary Chase's The Next Half Hour (1945), and Michael Myerberg's Dear Judas (1948).

In 1940 she designed costumes for a new staging of Giuseppe Verdi's Il trovatore for the Metropolitan Opera with director Herbert Graf. The new production debuted on December 12, 1940, with Jussi Björling as Manrico, Norina Greco as Leonora, and Frank Valentino as the Count Di Luna with Ferrucio Calusio conducting. The production remained in the Met's repertory through 1956. She designed the costumes for the 1947 world premiere production of Bernard Rogers's The Warrior. She also designed the costumes for Lee Simonson's production of Richard Wagner's Ring Cycle for the Metropolitan Opera in 1948.

Her husband was Eugene Joseph Cosgrove (1921–1980), and their son is the guitarist Mark Cosgrove who is a member of the Philadelphia-based bluegrass group the Lewis Brothers, and has worked extensively as a session musician for Jerry Douglas.

She died on August 30, 2005, in Tennent, New Jersey.
