= Christmas Duets =

Compilation album by Elvis Presley
- Released: October 10, 2008
- Recorded: September 5–7, 1957, May 15–July 1971 (Elvis' vocals and some instrumentation from original recordings); 2008 (new backing tracks and vocals)
- Genres: Country, pop, CCM, Christmas
- Length: 38:56
- Label: RCA
- Producers: Chuck Ainlay, Larry Hamby (as executive producer)

Professional ratings
Review scores
Source	Rating
Allmusic	3.5/5 stars

Christmas Duets is a 2008 album released by RCA Records, consisting of archival Elvis Presley vocal recordings mixed with completely re-recorded instrumentation and new vocals by contemporary country and gospel singers. Three tracks on the album do not have duet vocals: "The First Noel", "If I Get Home On Christmas Day", and "Winter Wonderland". However, the instrumental tracks for these songs were re-recorded by contemporary musicians, just like on all other songs. Martina McBride and Carrie Underwood duets have both charted on the Billboard country charts, with the former reaching the Top 40.

A second version of "Blue Christmas" was recorded with Martina McBride using mainly acoustic instrumentation in order to obtain a similar arrangement to the one used in the informal segments of Presley's '68 Comeback Special. Also, shots of McBride performing the song were digitally inserted into footage, taken from the original special, of Presley performing the same song, to use as a promotional music video for the album. The second version of "Blue Christmas" was never officially released outside the video.

On March 8, 2018, the album was awarded a Gold certification by the RIAA for selling in excess of 500,000 copies.

== Track Listing ==
- Unless otherwise indicated, Information is based on Liner Notes

No.	Title	Duet with	Length
1.	"Blue Christmas"	Martina McBride	2:30
2.	"I'll Be Home for Christmas"	Carrie Underwood	3:36
3.	"Here Comes Santa Claus (Right Down Santa Claus Lane)"	LeAnn Rimes	1:58
4.	"Santa Claus Is Back in Town"	Wynonna Judd	2:26
5.	"Silent Night"	Sara Evans	2:24
6.	"White Christmas"	Amy Grant	2:25
7.	"Merry Christmas Baby"	Gretchen Wilson	8:06
8.	"O Little Town of Bethlehem"	Karen Fairchild and Kimberly Schlapman of Little Big Town	2:38
9.	"Silver Bells"	Anne Murray	2:27
10.	"O Come, All Ye Faithful"	Olivia Newton-John	2:52
11.	"The First Noel" (2008)	—	2:14
12.	"If I Get Home On Christmas Day" (2008)	—	2:55
13.	"Winter Wonderland" (2008)	—	2:25

Notes

- Tracks 1–6 & 8: Originally recorded on September 5–7, 1957 for Elvis' Christmas Album
- Tracks 7 & 9–13: Originally recorded on May 15–16, 1971 for Elvis sings The Wonderful World of Christmas
- The Canadian edition of the album has a duet of "On A Snowy Christmas Night", performed with Renée Martel at track 11 right before the bonus tracks as the rest of the album is in order.

== Personnel ==
Original vocals and instrumentation

Partial credits from Keith Flynn and Ernst Jorgensen's examination of session tapes and RCA and AFM paperwork.

- Elvis Presley – lead vocals, acoustic rhythm guitar
- Millie Kirkham – backing vocals
- The Jordanaires (Gordon Stoker, Neal Matthews, Hoyt Hawkins, Hugh Jarrett) – backing vocals
- Scotty Moore – lead guitar
- James Burton – lead guitar
- Chip Young – rhythm guitar
- Norbert Putnam – bass
- Bill Black – bass
- Dudley Brooks – piano
- David Briggs – piano
- D.J. Fontana – drums
- Kenneth Buttrey – drums
- Jerry Carrigan – drums
- Charlie McCoy – harmonica, organ, percussion
- Charlie Hodge – acoustic rhythm guitar (uncertain)
- Gene Estes – marimba (uncertain)
- Eddie Hinton – lead guitar on "Merry Christmas Baby" (uncertain)
- Larrie Londin – additional drums, additional percussion
- Farrell Morris – bells, additional percussion
- Tommy Shepard – trombone (uncertain)

The Imperials

- Terry Blackwood – backing vocals
- Joe Moscheo – backing vocals
- Jimmie Murray – backing vocals
- Armond Morales – backing vocals
- Greg Gordon – backing vocals
- The Imperials – sampled background vocals (tracks 10–12)

Overdubbed

Unless otherwise indicated, overdub credits are obtained from the album's liner notes.

- Eddie Bayers – drums (tracks 1–8, 10–13)
- Richard Bennett – acoustic guitar (tracks 1–2, 6)
- Eric Darken – percussion (tracks 2, 5, 7–8)
- Sara Evans – additional vocals (track 5)
- Steve Gibson – guitar (electric on tracks 1–3, 5–6, acoustic on 8, additional on 4, 11–13)
- Ginger Holliday – background vocals (tracks 7, 10–12)
- David Hungate – bass guitar (tracks 3–5, 7–8, 10–13)
- John Jarvis – piano (tracks 2, 4–6, 11–13), Hammond organ (7)
- The Jordanaires – background vocals (tracks 1–6, 8–9, 13)
- Karen Fairchild – additional vocals (track 8)
- Kimberly Schlapman – additional vocals (track 8)
- Michael Black – Jordanaires group member (track 13)
- Louis Nunley – Jordanaires group member (tracks 1–6, 8–9, 13)
- Gordon Stoker – Jordanaires group member (tracks 1–6, 8–9, 13)
- Ray Walker – Jordanaires group member (tracks 1–6, 8–9, 13)
- Curtis Young – Jordanaires group member (tracks 1–6, 8–9)
- Millie Kirkham – background vocals (tracks 1–6, 8–9, 13, sampled on 10–12)
- Jim Long – electric guitar (track 3)
- Gordon Mote – Hammond organ (tracks 1–6, 8, 11–13)
- Anne Murray – additional vocals (track 9)
- Nashville String Machine – strings (track 11)
- Olivia Newton-John – additional vocals (track 10)
- Palmetto State Quartet (Larry Strickland, Brian Beatty, Kerry Beatty, Jeremy Calloway) – background vocals (track 4)
- LeAnn Rimes – additional vocals (track 3)
- Temple Riser – background vocals (tracks 7, 10–12)
- Hargus "Pig" Robbins – piano (tracks 1, 3, 8)
- Gretchen Wilson – additional vocals (track 7)
- Glenn Worf – bass guitar (tracks 1–2, 6)
- Renée Martel – lead vocals on "On a Snowy Christmas Night" (Canadian release only)

Production

- Steve Sholes – producer (original 1957 recordings) (uncredited)
- Thorne Nogar – engineer (original 1957 recordings) (uncredited)
- Felton Jarvis – producer (original 1971 recordings) (uncredited)
- Al Pachucki – engineer (original 1971 recordings) (uncredited)
- Mickey Crofford – engineer (original 1971 recordings) (uncredited)
- Chuck Ainlay – record producer (All tracks), audio mixing (All tracks), recording engineer (1–2, 4, 6, 8, 11–13, instrumental on 3, 5, 7, 9–10)
- Eric Bates – additional vocal recording engineer (track 5)
- Jim Cooley – audio mixing assistant (All tracks), assistant recording engineer (1–6, 8–13, instruments on 7)
- Carl Gorodetzky – string contractor (track 11)
- Mike Griffith – production coordinator (All tracks)
- Larry Hamby – record producer (All tracks)
- Chris Henry – additional vocal recording engineer (track 10)
- Ann Mincieli – additional vocal recording engineer (track 3)
- Ryan Nelson – assistant recording engineer (additional vocals on track 7)
- Bart Pursley – additional vocal recording engineer (track 7)
- Bergen White – string arrangements (track 11)
- Jeff Wolpert – additional vocal recording engineer (track 9)

== Chart positions ==
=== Weekly charts ===
Chart (2008)	Peak position
Australian Albums (ARIA)	20
Canadian Albums (Billboard)	6
US Billboard 200	17
US Top Country Albums (Billboard)	3

=== Year-end charts ===
Chart (2008)	Position
Australian Albums (ARIA)	94

Chart (2009)	Position
Canadian Albums (Billboard)	33
US Billboard 200	110
US Top Country Albums (Billboard)	22

=== Singles ===
Year	Single	Chart Positions	
Year	Single	US Country	US AC
2008	"Blue Christmas" (w/ Martina McBride)	36	22
2008	"I'll Be Home for Christmas" (w/ Carrie Underwood)	54	—

== Certifications ==
Region	Certification	Certified units/sales
Canada (Music Canada)	Platinum	80,000^{^}
United States (RIAA)	Gold	500,000^{‡}
^{^} Shipments figures based on certification alone.^{‡} Sales+streaming figures based on certification alone.
