= The Heat's On =

1943 film by Gregory Ratoff

- Theatrical release poster
- Directed by: Gregory Ratoff
- Screenplay by: Fitzroy Davis; George S. George
- Starring: Mae West; Victor Moore; William Gaxton
- Cinematography: Franz Planer
- Edited by: Otto Meyer
- Music by: Yasha Bunchuk; John Leipold
- Production company: Gregory Ratoff Productions
- Distributed by: Columbia Pictures
- Release date: November 25, 1943
- Running time: 79 min
- Country: United States
- Language: English

The Heat's On (1943) is a musical movie starring Mae West, William Gaxton, and Victor Moore, and released by Columbia Pictures.

== Plot ==
Broadway star Fay Lawrence is a temperamental diva who is reluctantly persuaded by a Broadway producer to star in his latest production.

== Cast ==
- Mae West as Fay Lawrence
- Victor Moore as Hubert Bainbridge
- William Gaxton as Tony Ferris
- Lester Allen as Mouse Beller
- Alan Dinehart as Forrest Stanton
- Mary Roche as Janey Adair
- Lloyd Bridges as Andy Walker
- Almira Sessions as Hannah Bainbridge
- Jack Owens as Himself
- Hazel Scott as Herself
- Xavier Cugat and His Orchestra as Themselves
- Edward Earle as Writer (uncredited)

== Production background ==
Mae West was 49 at the time of the movie's production, her first film in three years, after an interlude starring on Broadway. Unlike her previous films, for which West wrote the screenplays and/or story material, West played no part in creating the story or dialogue of The Heat's On. Perhaps as a result, the movie was not a box office success. West did not return to the screen until 27 years later in Myra Breckinridge (1970), and chose to pursue a successful career in theater instead.

=== Critical response ===
In The Nation in 1943, critic James Agee wrote that the picture is a "stale-ale musical in which a lot of good people apathetically support the almost equally apathetic Mae West ... Mae West is mainly as good as ever, which is still plenty good enough for me; but evidently she and her colleagues feel that too few people agree with me." Leonard Maltin declared, "Befuddled Moore and colorful Cugat are fun, but there isn't enough of West in this film; when she's on-screen, she's just as funny as ever."
