= Great Balls of Fire (Mae West album) =

Studio album by Mae West
- Released: 1972
- Recorded: 1968
- Genre: Garage rock, rock and roll
- Label: MGM
- Producer: Ian Whitcomb

Mae West chronology
Wild Christmas (1966)	Great Balls of Fire (1972)

Professional ratings
Review scores
Source	Rating
Billboard	unrated

Great Balls of Fire is a rock 'n roll record and the final album recorded by American actress and singer Mae West, released by MGM Records in 1972.

It was the third album release by West. Originally recorded in 1968, the album was released four years later, a few months before West turned 79. The record consisted of covers of rock classics and new original songs. It was produced by Ian Whitcomb and featured background vocals by The Mike Curb Congregation. Great Balls of Fire was not a commercial success and did not chart.

West's cover of Neil Sedaka's "Happy Birthday Sweet Sixteen" does not feature the original words and instead features new tongue-in-cheek lyrics written by Whitcomb, referring to age 21 as West celebrates the coming-of-age of a devoted fan. That version is generally known as "Happy Birthday Twenty-One". West later performed this song in her final motion picture, Sextette (1978).

The liner notes on the UK release, (MGM 2315207), credit strings, horns, and arrangements to Jerry Styner. They further state that Val Valentin was in charge of the Mastering at MGM Studios.

== Track listing ==
Side A

No.	Title	Writer(s)	Length
1.	"Great Balls of Fire"	Jack Hammer, Otis Blackwell	1:47
2.	"Men"	Ian Whitcomb	2:37
3.	"The Naked Ape"	Ian Whitcomb	3:36
4.	"The Grizzly Bear"	Irving Berlin, George Botsford	2:41
5.	"Whole Lotta Shakin' Goin' On"	Dave Williams, Sunny David	2:50

Side B

No.	Title	Writer(s)	Length
1.	"Happy Birthday Sweet Sixteen"	Neil Sedaka, Howard Greenfield, Ian Whitcomb	2:37
2.	"After the Lights Go Down"	Alan White, Leroy Lovett	2:03
3.	"Light My Fire"	John Densmore, Ray Manzarek, Robby Krieger, Jim Morrison	3:14
4.	"How Miss West Won World Peace"	Ian Whitcomb	3:40
5.	"Rock Around the Clock"	Max C. Freedman, Jimmy DeKnight	2:10
