= Henry Rosendahl =

Henry Rosendahl, also known as Henry A. Rosendale, (born Henry August Rozendal, July 16, 1904 – October 12, 1971) was an American playwright and novelist. A native of Chicago, he collaborated with fellow Chicagoan Ralph Thomas Kettering on the play A Lady in Pawn (1931) which was created for the actor Guy Bates Post. He moved to New York City where he worked as a script doctor for The Shubert Organization during the 1930s. He penned three plays staged on Broadway: Yesterday's Orchids (1934), Strip Girl (1935), and Clean Beds (1939). He authored the latter play under the pseudonym George S. George which he also used as a screenwriter for the film The Heat's On (1943) as well as other stage works. His play Protective Custody (1940) was staged in Chicago after winning a play writing contest. He was also the author of the novel Mary Magdalen Smith (1938). He served in the United States Army during World War II. He died in Adams County, Illinois in 1971.

== Life and career ==
The son of Henry Dirk Rozendal and Seraphine Rozendal (née Grothy), Henry August Rosendahl (originally spelled Rozendal) was born in Chicago, Illinois on July 16, 1904. He had two sisters, Gladys Mae and Josephine, who both lived in Chicago as adults. With Ralph Thomas Kettering he co-authored the play A Lady in Pawn for the actor Guy Bates Post for which he was credited under the name Henry A. Rosendale. It premiered at the Powers Theatre in Grand Rapids, Michigan in March 1931. At the time the play was written he was living in Quincy, Illinois.

After this Henry became a New York City based playwright connected with The Shubert Organization under the name Henry Rosendahl. He worked as a script doctor in the 1930s for other playwrights like James A. Timoney. In 1934 his play Yesterday's Orchids was staged on Broadway at the Fulton Theatre. The cast was led by Carleton Young and Ann Whitney. In 1935 his play Strip Girl about an American burlesque star premiered at the Longacre Theatre with Mayo Methot leading the cast. Rowland Field of the Brooklyn Times Union found the play "crude to the point of discomfort" Critic Burns Mantle wrote that the work was "profanely honest" with the language being offensive but truthful to the characters. While not a musical, the work contained music by Harry Archer and Sol Bomser that was played by Marty Beck's Orchestra.

In 1938 the Macaulay Company published his novel Mary Magdalen Smith; a work set in 1930s Manhattan whose heroine was loosely based on the Biblical figure Mary Magdalene. The Sacramento Bee stated the novel was a "sordid tale of a woman of the street" that was "for readers with strong stomachs". The book was banned by Boston censors shortly after it came out on the same day that Rosendahl was named an honorary member of the Eugene Field Society.

Rosendahl authored the play Clean Beds using the pseudonym George S. George. It was based on a story treament by Mae West (who was uncredited, and not involved in the production as an actor) and staged on Broadway at the John Golden Theatre in May 1939. This pseudonym was also used for the screenplay for the film The Heat's On (1943). Both Clean Beds and The Heat's On were projects attached to Mae West. He also co-authored the play Caviar to the General (1946) with Eugenie Leontovich using this pseudonym.

In 1940 he was appointed to the sales convention department of the Jam Handy organization. That same year he won a playwriting contest organized by The Radio-Theater, Inc. for his play Protective Custody. This organization staged the world premiere of the play on December 13, 1940 at the Civic Theater in Chicago. He married Mildred Eleen Kopronetz on May 31, 1940 in Paris, Missouri. He served in the United States Army during World War II from January 1943 through July 1944.

He died in Adams County, Illinois on October 12, 1971.
