= Ian Whitcomb's Mod, Mod Music Hall! =

Studio album by Ian Whitcomb
- Released: October 1966
- Recorded: Hollywood, Los Angeles
- Genres: Music hall; ragtime; old-time
- Length: 36:06
- Label: Tower
- Producers: David Mallet; Ian Whitcomb

Ian Whitcomb chronology
| You Turn Me On (1966) | Ian Whitcomb's Mod, Mod Music Hall! (1966) | Yellow Underground (1967) |

Singles from Ian Whitcomb's Mod, Mod Music Hall!
- 1. "Where Did Robinson Crusoe Go with Friday on Saturday Night" Released: November 1966

Ian Whitcomb's Mod, Mod Music Hall! is the second album by English musician Ian Whitcomb, released in October 1966 by Tower Records. Produced by Whitcomb and David Mallet, the album is a collection of early ragtime and British music hall songs, both genres being early loves of Whitcomb, and in this way it marks a departure from the pop sound of his debut, You Turn Me On (1966). The record's style is considered humorous and campy.

Mod, Mod Music Hall! was released during a vogue for music hall sounds in pop, and featured detailed liner notes by Whitcomb. In the United States, it sold well outside the Cash Box albums chart, but was less successful in the United Kingdom. One song, "Where Did Robinson Crusoe Go with Friday on Saturday Night", was issued a single and was a hit in California. Reviewers of the album drew attention to it being a departure for Whitcomb, and several found its style playful. After some time out of print, both Mod, Mod Music Hall! and its predecessor were reissued together in 1997 by Sundazed Music.

== Background and recording ==
In 1965, Whitcomb found success in the United States with the hit single "You Turn Me On", and followed it with his debut album, also titled You Turn Me On (1966), which featured a Carnaby Street-style pop sound. Despite his popularity, Whitcomb was not a comfortable fit for a teen heartthrob, as his first musical love was for Tin Pan Alley and its stylistic descendants, such as British music hall and ragtime. The singer's passion for these genres formed the basis of Ian Whitcomb's Mod, Mod Music Hall!, his second album. The liner notes for the record, which features short histories of both music hall and ragtime, comment that Whitcomb has "combined a love of ancient music with his history, stirred them together on a geriatric upright piano and here we are."

Ian Whitcomb's Mod, Mod Music Hall! was recorded in Hollywood, Los Angeles, with the side musician James Burton – recognised for his work with Elvis Presley and Ricky Nelson – buried in the arrangements. Whitcomb produced the album with David Mallet, while seven engineers are credited in the liner notes, including Kearney Barton and Larry Levine. In promotional material, the album was called 'A Jerden Production'.

== Composition ==
Ian Whitcomb's Mod, Mod Music Hall! consists entirely of old ragtime and early British music hall songs and ditties, delivered with a humorous approach. As the critic David F. Wagner describes, the album features "campy performance" of historic music hall and 1920s songs, with Whitcomb creating a character for the 'singer' of each number, while biographer Mark Deming says the record is "devoted entirely to classic music hall numbers". Dorothy Korslund and Mary Mayne of The Idaho Press write that the album "features some wild Cockney sounds." Another critic said the album contains "up-to-date versions of a collection of old timey songs". Whitcomb performs on the album with a ukulele.

One music hall song, the traditional "Your Baby Has Gone Down The Plug-Hole", concerns a gin-drinking mother who, as the name suggests, washed her baby down the plughole, and had been performed at Paul McCartney at the Star Club in Hamburg, Germany, during the Beatles' stay there. The popularity of Whitcomb's version, however, was demonstrated when the band Cream performed it live in a bar as a joke; as biographer Dave Thompson writes, "when a few of the bar's patrons joined in, it shouldn't have been a surprise; Whitcomb was selling a lot of records in those days." Cream later recorded a studio version for their album Disraeli Gears (1967), albeit with the new title "Mother's Lament".

== Release and reception ==
=== Marketing and commercial response ===
Considered a long-awaited album, Ian Whitcomb's Mod, Mod Music Hall! was released in October 1966 by Tower Records in the United States, with the catalogue number T 5042. In the months leading up to its release, English music hall songs and 1920s-style sounds had become fashionable in pop, with examples such as the New Vaudeville Band's "Winchester Cathedral" and Peter and Gordon's "Lady Godiva", making the album appear well-timed. The album was packaged with informative liner notes about the songs and music hall, penned by Whitcomb himself.

To promote the record, "Where Did Robinson Crusoe Go with Friday on Saturday Night" was issued as a single in November. The song, originally popularised by Al Jolson in 1916, became a successful regional hit in California. Print advertisements for the album in Billboard called it "the most talked about new LP of 1966", and one of several "hot albums" on Tower recommended for Thanksgiving celebrations. In December, Cash Box listed Mod, Mod Music Hall! in their "basic album inventory" of best-selling pop albums that did not break the Cash Box Top 100 Album chart. Despite Whitcomb's success in the U.S., he remained obscure in his native United kingdom, inspiring comparison to Chad & Jeremy in the press.

=== Critical reception ===
In a contemporary review for the Sunday Post-Crescent, Wagner deemed the album the "pleasantest surprise!", adding: "With a little creativeness, the historic pieces are highly entertaining – campy though they may be." Wagner praiseds Whitcomb for not merely singing the numbers but embodying a different character for his vocals on each song: "This, combined with some astonishingly informative liner notes, by Ian himself, about the songs and the music hall, equals a humorous, nostalgic collection." In the St. Petersburg Times, Chick Ober described the album as "mad" but said listeners would enjoy it, praising Whitcomb for being "always original and always entertaining", and highlighting "Oh Helen", "Coney Island Washboard", "Saucy Seaside Sue" and "That Ragtime Shuffle".

A reviewer for Record World commented that an album of old music hall and ragtime ditties was a "different kind of endeavour" for Whitcomb, but added that his humorous approach is "not without contemporary appeal", believing that any of its tracks could make potential novelty hit singles. In Ireland, the Evening Herald's critic said the album updated an array of "old timey songs" but felt that, although numerous songs are "well handled" by Whitcomb, the album as a whole "is rather disappointing". Writing for the Independent Star-News in 1967, Bill Yaryan said that Whitcomb realised his style "is out-of-step with what's happening today (not necessarily tomorrow)", highlighting the record as an example.

== Legacy and retrospective reviews ==
Professional ratings
Review scores
| Source | Rating |
|---|---|
| AllMusic | 2/5 stars |
| The Rolling Stone Album Guide | 2/5 stars |

Ian Whitcomb's Mod, Mod Music Hall! eventually fell out of print, as did its predecessor, You Turn Me On. In April 1997, Sundazed Music re-released both albums on a single CD. In a review of the joint reissue, The Flint Journal critic Martin Natchez opined that both records "confirm that Whitcomb's career as a rock star was better short-lived", adding that Mod, Mod Music Hall! is a "superb" album which "is infinitely more campy and truer to Whitcomb's current career as a Tin Pan Alley musicologist and ragtime entertainer."

In his retrospective review of Mod, Mod Music Hall! for AllMusic, Unterberger questioned who the audience was in 1966 for a British Invasion one-hit wonder suddenly releasing an album of music hall and ragtime songs. Unterberger felt that, despite "the audaciousness of the concept", the execution was pallid and "unbearably corny", and believed that, regardless of Whitcomb's sincerity, he does not sound "particularly more adept or inspired than many a pub singer you might come across in the English provinces." In The Rolling Stone Album Guide (1983), David Fricke rated the album two out of five stars, noting as a whole that Whitcomb records faithful tributes to old-fashioned music "not with academic admiration but with the humor of a true fan". In Terry Waldo's book This Is Ragtime (1991), Mod, Mod Music Hall is one of two Whitcomb albums listed in a selected discography of ragtime albums, alongside Under the Ragtime Moon (1972). Further displaying his passion for the genres he explores on the album, Whitcomb later wrote scholarly books about the music. (Note: In a 2019 interview, Brent Ranfall of the Los Angeles-based baroque pop band praised the album: "Jaunty lil' piano numbers for you and yours." On 11 December 2025, "Robinson Crusoe" aired on WPPM-LP's Oldies Time Machine.)

== Track listing ==
Side one

1. "Poor Little Bird" (Ian Whitcomb) – 2:02
2. "Got a Date with an Angel" (Jack Waller, Joseph Tunbridge, Clifford Grey, Sonny Miller) – 1:19
3. "The Night I Appeared as Macbeth" (William Hargreaves) – 3:01
4. "August, 1914" (Weston Jarvis) – 1:54
5. "Coney Island Washboard" (Hampton Durand, Jerry Adams, Ned Nestor, Claude Shugart) – 1:33
6. "Mother! Mother! Mother! (What a Naughty Boy Am I)" (Jimmy Harper, Will E. Haines, Harry Parr-Davies) – 2:25
7. "The Junkman Rag" (Luckey Roberts, Chris Smith, Ferdinand E. Mierich) – 1:58
8. "The Sweetheart of Sigma Chi" (Byron D. Stokes, F. Dudleigh Vernor) – 3:20

Side two

1. "The Awful Tale of Maggie May" (traditional) – 3:02
2. "Where Did Robinson Crusoe Go with Friday on Saturday Night?" (Sam M. Lewis, Joe Young, George W. Meyer) – 1:44
3. "Saucy Seaside Sue" (Whitcomb) – 1:45
4. "Reindeer - A Ragtime Two Step" (Joseph F. Lamb) – 3:45
5. "Ida! Sweet as Apple Cider" (Eddie Leonard, Eddie Munson) – 1:58
6. "That Ragtime Suffragette" (traditional) – 2:22
7. "Oh Helen!" (Chas. R. McCarron, Carey Morgan) – 0:55
8. "Your Baby Has Gone Down the Plug-Hole" (Prof. Seigfried Gildenblatten) - 2:03

== Personnel ==
Adapted from the liner notes of Ian Whitcomb's Mod, Mod Music Hall!

- Ian Whitcomb – producer, liner notes
- David Mallet – producer
- Ben Jordan – engineer
- Charles Underwood – engineer
- Kearney Barton – engineer
- Larry Levine – engineer
- Peter Selwood – engineer
- Sy Mitchell – engineer
- Thorne Nogar – engineer
- George Jerman – photography
