= The Fabulous Mae West =

Studio album by Mae West
- Released: 1956
- Genre: Traditional pop
- Label: Decca Records

Mae West chronology
The Fabulous Mae West (1956)	Way Out West (1966)

Professional ratings
Review scores
Source	Rating
AllMusic	2.5/5 stars

The Fabulous Mae West is a 1956 album released by film star Mae West on Decca Records in 1956. The album featured new songs and classic American popular music of the 1920s, 1930's and 1940s, including several songs long associated with the star. The album was in print for over twenty-five years, available on MCA Records into the 1980s. The record was produced by Milt Gabler.

== Tracks ==
1. Love is the Greatest Thing (Frank Still, Michael Lindon)
2. I'm in the Mood for Love (Jimmy McHugh, Dorothy Fields)
3. Pecado (Pontier, Francini, Carlos Bahr)
4. My Daddy Rocks Me (With One Steady Roll) (J. Bernie Barbour)
5. All of Me (Seymour Simons, Gerald Marks)
6. They Call Me Sister Honky Tonk (Harvey Brooks, Gladys DuBois, Ben Ellison)
7. Frankie and Johnny (traditional)
8. I Want You, I Need You (Harvey Brooks, Ben Ellison)
9. Havana For a Night (Gonzalo Curiel, Oscar Hammerstein II)
10. A Guy What Takes His Time (Ralph Rainger)
11. If I Could Be With You (Henry Creamer, James P. Johnson)
12. Criswell Predicts (Mae West)
