= After the Ball: Pop Music from Rag to Rock =

1972 book by Ian Whitcomb

- Cover of the 1973 UK Penguin edition
- Author: Ian Whitcomb
- Language: English
- Subject: Pop music
- Genre: Musicology, autobiography
- Publisher: Penguin Books
- Publication date: 1972
- Publication place: UK
- Pages: 312 (UK paperback edition)
- ISBN: 014 00 3450 1

After the Ball: Pop Music from Rag to Rock is a book by Ian Whitcomb, published in 1972, covering the history of pop music from the start of the twentieth century until the 1960s, including the brief period when Whitcomb himself became a pop star.

The book was published by Penguin Books in the UK, and Simon & Schuster in the U.S.. It was described in a Billboard review as "valuable for its historianship of the way rock grew out of the earlier Tin Pan Alley approach to pop." Music critic Richie Unterberger described it as "a thorough history of pre-rock popular music forms", and musician Luther Russell described it as "one of the more witty and personal books on the subject of popular music".
