= You Turn Me On (song) =

"You Turn Me On (Turn On Song)"

Single by Ian Whitcomb and Bluesville
- B-side: "Poor But Honest"
- Released: 1965
- Genre: British Invasion, Rock & Roll, novelty
- Length: 2:44
- Label: Tower 134
- Songwriter: Ian Whitcomb
- Producer: Jerry Dennon

Ian Whitcomb and Bluesville singles chronology
"This Sporting Life" (1965)	"You Turn Me On (Turn On Song)" (1965)	"N-E-R-V-O-US!" (1965)

"You Turn Me On (Turn On Song)" is a 1965 single by Ian Whitcomb and Bluesville, written by Ian Whitcomb.

== Background ==
The song is noticeable for Whitcomb's falsetto and "orgasmic vocal hook". Whitcomb recorded this song with his band, Bluesville. The hit version is edited; the original single as recorded was over 3 minutes and had a longer intro during which a mike stand can be clearly heard falling into a studio wall and it had a cold ("stinger") ending. The band Bluesville featured Mick Molloy on lead guitar, Deke O'Brien on Rhythm Guitar, Brian Lynch on bass, Ian McGarry on drums and Pete Adler and Barry Richardson on saxophones.

== Chart performance ==
As part of the British Invasion, "You Turn Me On" peaked at number 8 on the Billboard Hot 100 chart in the U.S. the week of July 17, 1965 and number 30 in Canada.
