= Santa Claus Is Back in Town =

Single by Elvis Presley

from the album Elvis' Christmas Album
- A-side: "Santa Bring My Baby Back (to Me)" (UK 1957)
- B-side: "Blue Christmas" (US 1965)
- Published: Elvis Presley Music, Inc.
- Released: October 15, 1957
- Recorded: September 7, 1957
- Genre: Christmas; rock and roll
- Length: 2:25
- Label: RCA Victor
- Songwriter: Leiber-Stoller
- Producer: Leiber-Stoller

Elvis Presley singles chronology
"Puppet on a String" (1965)	"Santa Claus Is Back in Town" (1957)	"Tell Me Why" (1966)

"Santa Claus Is Back in Town" is a Christmas song written in 1957 by Jerry Leiber and Mike Stoller, and first recorded that year by Elvis Presley as the opening track on Elvis' Christmas Album, the best-selling Christmas/holiday album of all time in the United States. The song has become a rock and roll Christmas standard.

"Santa Claus Is Back in Town" was paired with "Santa, Bring My Baby Back to Me" and was issued as a UK single concurrently with the album's release in 1957. The single reached number 7 on the UK Singles Chart in November 1957. RCA rereleased the song as a 45 vinyl 7" single in 1985, PB-14237B, paired with "Merry Christmas, Baby". In 1980, the song reached number 41 on the UK singles chart in December in a six-week chart run.

In 1965 the single "Blue Christmas"/"Santa Claus is Back in Town" reached the number 4 position on the Billboard Top Christmas Singles.

The "Blue Christmas"/"Santa Claus is Back in Town" single was certified Platinum by the RIAA in 1999.

== Synopsis ==
The song consists of an elaborate double entendre in which the singer, identifying himself as Santa Claus but having no sleigh, reindeer or sack of toys, promises to arrive in "a big black Cadillac" with the intent of "coming down (a young woman's) chimney" Christmas Eve.

== Album appearances ==
The song appeared on the original RCA Victor LP, Elvis' Christmas Album, the 1958 reissue, the 1970 RCA Camden reissue, the UK release of the Camden version, CDS 1155, the 1975 Pickwick reissue, and the 1985 RCA Special Products rerelease. The song also appeared on many subsequent compilations. The song was included as a bonus track in the 1997 reissue CD of the compilation Elvis' Gold Records, Volume 2. The song was greatly reworked for the 2008 Presley album Christmas Duets, with new instruments combined with archival Presley vocals to create an artificial duet with Wynonna Judd.

The song is the opening track on the 2017 album Christmas with Elvis and the Royal Philharmonic Orchestra.

1957 UK sheet music cover, Belinda Ltd., Southern Music, London

== Personnel ==
"Santa Claus Is Back In Town" was recorded on September 7, 1957, at Radio Recorders, Hollywood, California. The musicians on the session were:

- Elvis Presley – vocals
- Scotty Moore – guitar
- Bill Black – bass
- D. J. Fontana – drums
- Dudley Brooks – piano
- Millie Kirkham and the Jordanaires (Gordon Stoker, Neal Matthews Jr., Hoyt Hawkins, and Hugh Jarrett) – backing vocals

== Covers ==
Many musical artists have covered the song. Notably, Dwight Yoakam featured the song on his 1997 Christmas album Come On Christmas and released it as a single. The single reached number 60 on the Billboard Hot Country Songs chart.

The song was covered by Nashville band, the Royal Court of China and featured, along with Floyd Cramer, Elvis Presley's original band, D. J. Fontana, Scotty Moore, Jimmy "Orion" Ellis, and the Jordanaires on MWC America Records. This was the last recording the original members appeared on together.

Another notable version was by Robert Plant and the Honeydrippers, as performed on Saturday Night Live on December 15, 1984. Jonny Lang covered it on 1997's A Very Special Christmas 3. Little Steven and the Disciples of Soul covered the song for the 2018 film The Christmas Chronicles.

Lainey Wilson performed the song live on the NBC holiday TV special Christmas at Graceland, which aired on Wednesday, November 29, 2023.

== Chart performance ==
The recording was a top ten hit on the UK Singles Chart and a top five hit on the Billboard Christmas Singles chart. The single was certified Platinum by the RIAA.

=== Elvis Presley recording ===
Chart (1957)	Peak position
UK Singles Chart	7
Chart (1965)	Peak position
U.S. Billboard Christmas Singles	4

=== 1980 Elvis Presley re-release ===
Year	Single	Chart positions
Year	Single	UK Singles Chart
1980	"Santa Claus Is Back in Town"	41

=== Dwight Yoakam recording ===
Year	Single	Chart positions
Year	Single	US Country
1997	"Santa Claus Is Back in Town"	60

== Movie appearances ==
- Iron Man 3 (2013)
- Fred Claus (2007)
- Miracle on 34th Street (1994)
- C.R.A.Z.Y. (2005)
- The Long Kiss Goodnight (1996)
- Bad Santa 2 (2016)
- The Christmas Chronicles (2018)

== Sources ==
- Guralnick, Peter. The King of Rock 'n' Roll: The Complete 50's Masters, insert booklet. RCA 66050–2, 1992.
- Guralnick, Peter. From Nashville to Memphis: The Essential '60s Masters, insert booklet. RCA 66160–2, 1993.
- Guralnick, Peter (1994). Last Train to Memphis: The Rise of Elvis Presley. Little Brown GBR. ISBN 978-0-316-91020-0.
- Hopkins, Jerry (1971). Elvis: A Biography. ISBN 978-0-671-20973-5.
- Wolfe, Charles. Elvis Presley: If Every Day Was Like Christmas, liner notes. BMG Australia Limited, 7863664822, 1994.
