= Ian Whitcomb =

English singer-songwriter (1941–2020)

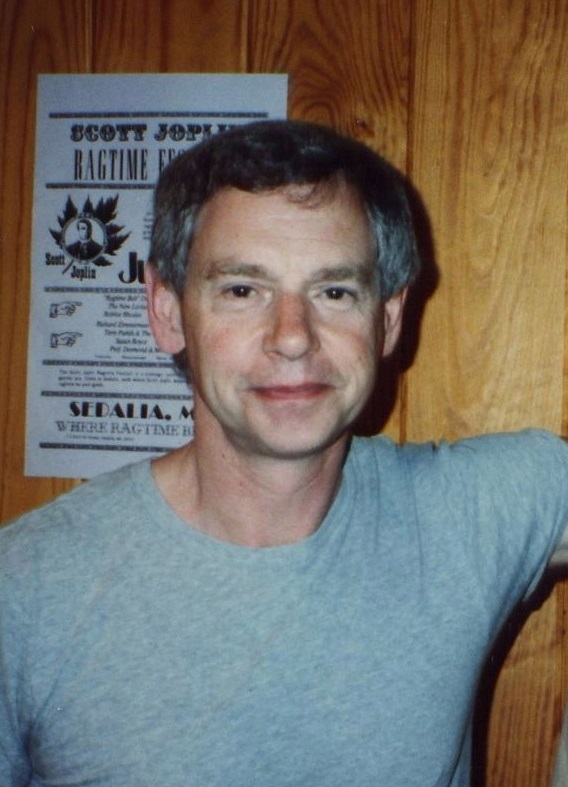
- Whitcomb in 1990

Background information
- Born: Ian Timothy Whitcomb; 10 July 1941; Woking, Surrey, England
- Died: 19 April 2020 (aged 78) Pasadena, California, U.S.
- Occupations: Singer, songwriter, author, writer, broadcaster, actor
- Instruments: Ukulele, accordion
- Years active: 1963–2012
- Website: http://www.picklehead.com/ian.html

Ian Timothy Whitcomb (10 July 1941 – 19 April 2020) was an English entertainer, singer-songwriter, record producer, writer, broadcaster and actor. As part of the British Invasion, his hit song "You Turn Me On" reached number 8 on the Billboard Hot 100 chart in 1965.

He wrote several books on popular music, beginning with After the Ball, published by Penguin Books (Britain) and Simon & Schuster (United States) in 1972. He accompanied his singing by playing the ukulele and, through his records, concerts, and film work, helped to stimulate the revival of interest in the instrument. His re-creation of the music played aboard the RMS Titanic in the film of that name won a Grammy Award in 1998 for package design and a nomination for Whitcomb's liner notes (Titanic: Music as Heard on the Fateful Voyage).

== Early life ==
Whitcomb was born in Woking, Surrey, England to Patrick and Eileen (née Burningham). He was the second-born of three children. He spent his childhood years in Scarborough, Thorpeness and Putney. His father worked for Whitcomb's grandfather's film company British Screen Classics in the 1920s, eventually co-starring in Mr. Nobody (released by Fox in 1929). His father was a trained pianist and encouraged Whitcomb to also play piano. Growing up, Whitcomb's chief musical inspirations were Phil Harris, Johnnie Ray, Guy Mitchell, Elvis Presley, and George Formby. He was sent away to boarding school in 1949 (Newlands, Seaford, Sussex) at age 8 and there he soon formed a tissue paper-and-comb band to entertain staff and boys with current hits such as "Riders in the Sky".

== Music and writing career ==
At Bryanston, a public school in Dorset, England, Whitcomb began writing comic and other songs. He started a skiffle group in 1957 and then a rock and roll band in 1959. After leaving school, he worked at Harrods and then as an assistant at film studios. With his younger brother Robin on drums, he formed a band, The Ragtime Suwanee Six, that played at parties in the Surrey area and was managed by Denny Cordell, later to produce records by Procol Harum and Joe Cocker. Robin went on to play tambourine on Sonny & Cher's hit "I Got You Babe" (1965).

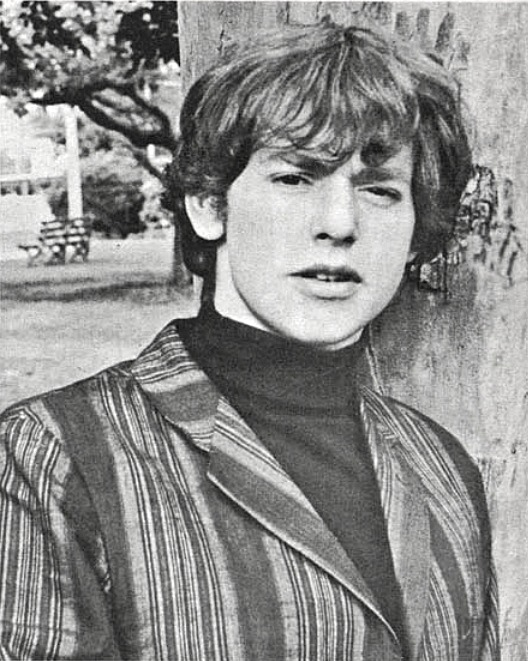
Whitcomb circa 1966

Around 1963, while studying history at Trinity College, Dublin, Whitcomb became a founding member and lead vocalist of Dublin's early rhythm and blues band, Bluesville. After some unreleased early recordings, Whitcomb travelled to Seattle, where he performed and was signed to record for Jerden Records. After returning to Dublin, he recorded "This Sporting Life", written by Brownie McGhee and previously recorded as a skiffle number by Chas McDevitt. Whitcomb's recording was then licensed to the Tower label, a subsidiary of Capitol Records, for release in the US. It reached number 100 for one week on the Billboard Hot 100.

Their next record release, again credited as Ian Whitcomb & Bluesville, "You Turn Me On", was a novelty song largely improvised at the end of a recording session in Dublin. Released as a single on the Tower label, it reached Billboard's number 8 spot in July 1965 – it was the first Irish-produced record to reach the US charts – but did not chart in Britain. During his summer vacation in 1965, Whitcomb went to America to appear on such television programs as Shindig, Hollywood A Go-Go and American Bandstand. Whitcomb played the Hollywood Bowl with The Beach Boys in 1965 and then toured with The Rolling Stones, The Kinks, and Sam the Sham and the Pharaohs.

"N-E-R-V-O-U-S!", Whitcomb's next release, which was also a novelty song, was recorded in Hollywood and reached No. 59 in Billboard and No. 47 in Cash Box. He returned to Dublin for his history finals and received a BA degree. In 1966 he turned to early popular song: His version of a 1916 Al Jolson comedy number, "Where Did Robinson Crusoe Go with Friday on Saturday Night?" was a West Coast hit, reviving the ukulele before the emergence of Tiny Tim.

After making four albums for the Tower label, Whitcomb retired as a pop performer, later writing that he "wanted no part of the growing pretentiousness of rock with its mandatory drugs and wishy-washy spiritualism and its increasing loud and metallic guitar sounds." However, in 1969 he produced Mae West on her album called Great Balls of Fire for MGM Records. He then returned to the UK and was commissioned by Penguin Books to write a history of pop music, After the Ball, published in 1972. He appeared on several BBC TV shows and was an early presenter of the BBC show The Old Grey Whistle Test in 1971.

Whitcomb settled in California in the late 1970s. He starred in and wrote L.A.–My Home Town (BBC TV; 1976) and Tin Pan Alley (PBS; 1974). He wrote Tin Pan Alley, A Pictorial History (1919–1939) and a novel, Lotusland: A Story of Southern California, published in 1979. He also provided the music for a documentary film, Bugs Bunny: Superstar (UA; 1975), which was narrated by Orson Welles. For Play-Rite Music he cut 18 piano rolls that were included in an album, Pianomelt. His other albums reflected his research into the genres of ragtime, Tin Pan Alley, vaudeville and music hall. These, beginning with Under the Ragtime Moon (1972), were released on several record labels including Warner Bros. Records, United Artists and Decca Records. During that time he also wrote and produced singles for Warner Bros.' country division, most notably "Hands", a massage parlour story, and "A Friend of a Friend of Mine".

In the 1980s Whitcomb published Rock Odyssey: A Chronicle of the Sixties: Ian Whitcomb, a memoir of the 1960s and described by The New York Times as the best personal account of this period. He also published Ragtime America (Limelight Editions, 1988), followed by a memoir of life as a British expatriate in Los Angeles, Resident Alien (Century, 1990). He wrote extensively on music, culture, and books for a diverse range of magazines including Radio Times, the Los Angeles Times, The Daily Telegraph, The London Magazine. He produced a British documentary on black music, Legends of Rhythm and Blues (part of the series Repercussions, made by Third Eye Productions for Channel Four in 1984). He also hosted a radio show in Los Angeles for 15 years, taking the program from KROQ-FM to KCRW and finally to KPCC-FM.

He continued recording, producing a series of CD collections: Treasures of Tin Pan Alley, Al Jolson songs, and Titanic- Music As Heard On The Fateful Voyage. His liner notes were nominated for a Grammy. His songs are heard in the films Bloody Movie (1987), Cold Sassy Tree (1989), Encino Man (1992), Grass (1999), Man of the Century (1999), Stanley's Gig (2000), After the Storm (2001), The Cat's Meow (2002), Last Call (2002), Sleep Easy, Hutch Rimes (2002), Lonesome Jim (2005) and Fido (2006).

== Later life ==
Whitcomb lived in Southern California with his wife, Regina (née Enzer), and their dog, Toby. He performed, on accordion and ukulele, at music festivals and major venues throughout America, often with his ragtime band, The Bungalow Boys, as well as with a larger orchestra. He continued writing, and made frequent guest appearances. He notably performed live and on recordings as a special guest of ukulele chanteuse Janet Klein's Parlour Boys. He was a regular performer at Cantalini's Restaurant in Playa del Rey, California. He appeared as Grand Marshal in the 24th Occasional Pasadena Doo Dah Parade on November 19, 1999.

From November 2007, he had an internet radio program on Wednesday evenings from 8:00 p.m. until 10:00 p.m.(PST) at Luxuria Music. He signed with Premiere Radio Networks in September 2010 to launch The Ian Whitcomb Show on XM satellite radio, Channel 24. He was named as a BEST OF L.A. in 2008 by Los Angeles magazine.

In 2009 Whitcomb wrote and, with his Bungalow Boys, performed original music for the West Coast Premiere of The Jazz Age, a play by Allan Knee, at the Blank Theater Company's 2nd Stage Theater in Los Angeles, for which he was nominated for an L.A. Theater Award.

As an educator, Whitcomb lectured on early American popular song and composers throughout the California library system. He was a favorite speaker at the annual Oregon Festival of American Music and at the Workman and Temple Families Homestead Museum.

== Illness and death ==
Whitcomb died in Pasadena, California at a care facility on 19 April 2020, from complications of a stroke he had suffered in 2012. He was 78.

== Selected discography ==
=== Singles ===
Year	A-side/B-side Both sides from same album except where indicated	Label & number	U.S. Charts		Canada	Album
Year	A-side/B-side Both sides from same album except where indicated	Label & number	Billboard	Cashbox	RPM	Album
1964	"Soho" b/w "Boney Moronie"	Jerden 735	—	—	—	Non-album tracks
1965	"This Sporting Life" (Ian Whitcomb and Bluesville) b/w "Fizz" (Ian Whitcomb and Barry Richardson)	Jerden 747	—	—	—	Non-album tracks
1965	"This Sporting Life" b/w "Fizz"; Both sides: Ian Whitcomb and Bluesville	Tower 120	100	87	—	You Turn Me On!
1965	"You Turn Me On (Turn On Song)" b/w "Poor But Honest"; Both sides: Ian Whitcomb and Bluesville	Tower 134	8	10	30	You Turn Me On!
1965	"N-E-R-V-O-U-S!" b/w "The End" (Non-album track)	Tower 155	59	47	12	You Turn Me On!
1965	"18 Whitcomb Street" b/w "Fizz" (from You Turn Me On!)	Tower 170	—	—	—	Non-album track
1965	"No Tears For Johnny" b/w "Be My Baby"	Tower 189	—	—	—	You Turn Me On!
1965	"High Blood Pressure" b/w "Good Hard Rock" (Non-album track)	Tower 192	—	—	—	Sock Me Some Rock
1965	"Lover's Prayer" b/w "Your Baby Has Gone Down The Plug-Hole" (from Ian Whitcomb's Mod, Mod Music Hall!)	Tower 212	—	—	—	Non-album track
1965	"Don't Think Twice It's Alright" b/w "As Tears Go By"	Jerden 788	—	—	—	Non-album tracks
1965	"Louie Louie" b/w "Walk Right In"; Both sides: "Sir Arthur"	Tower 216	—	—	—	Non-album tracks
1966	"You Won't See Me" (Ian Whitcomb and Somebody's Chyldren) b/w "Please Don't Leave Me On The Shelf" (Ian Whitcomb and Bluesville Of London)	Tower 251	—	—	—	Non-album tracks
1966	"Where Did Robinson Crusoe Go With; Friday On Saturday Night" (Ian Whitcomb and His Seaside Syncopators) b/w "Poor Little Bird" (Ian Whitcomb and His Radio Band)	Tower 274	101	—	—	Ian Whitcomb's Mod, Mod Music Hall!
1966	"You Really Bent Me Out Of Shape" b/w "Rolling Home With Georgeanne"	Tower 336	—	—	—	Non-album tracks
1967	"Sally Sails The Sky" b/w "Groovy Day"	Tower 385	—	—	—	Non-album tracks
1973	"Yaaka Hula Hickey Dula" b/w "They Go Wild, Simply Wild Over Me"	United Artists 162	—	—	—	Under The Ragtime Moon
1976	"Somewhere In Virginia In The Rain" (Kenni Huskey with Ian Whitcomb) b/w "Pancho" (Kenni Huskey and The Kids On The Street)	Warner Brothers 8180	—	—	—	Non-album tracks

=== Albums ===
- 1965 You Turn Me On (Billboard #125—Tower T (Mono)/ST (Stereo) 5004)
- 1966 Ian Whitcomb's Mod, Mod Music Hall! (Tower T/ST 5042)
- 1967 Yellow Underground (Tower T/ST 5071)
- 1968 Sock Me Some Rock (Tower SDT 5100)
- 1970 On the Pier (World Record Club/EMI ST 1010)
- 1972 Under the Ragtime Moon (United Artists UAS 29403)
- 1972 Great Balls of Fire (Mae West album)UK (MGM 235207):(Liner notes credits:"Piano/conceived/produced/directed by Ian Whitcomb in Hollywood").
- 1973 You Turn Me On (Ember Records NR 5065)
- 1974 Hip Hooray for Neville Chamberlain! (Argo/Decca 2DA 162)
- 1976 Crooner Tunes (First American 7704)
- 1976 Treasures of Tin Pan Alley (Audiophile AP 115)
- 1977 Ian Whitcomb's Red Hot Blue Heaven (Warner Bros. K56347)
- 1979 Ian Whitcomb: The Rock & Roll Years (First American FA 7729)
- 1980 At The Ragtime Ball (Audiophile AP 147)
- 1980 Instrumentals (First American FA 7751)
- 1980 Pianomelt (Sierra Briar SRAS 8708)
- 1981 In Hollywood! (First American FA 7789)
- 1982 Don’t Say Goodbye, Miss Ragtime (with Dick Zimmerman) (Stomp Off SOS 1017)
- 1983 My Wife is Dancing Mad (with Dick Zimmerman) (Stomp Off SOS 1049)
- 1983 The Boogie Woogie Jungle Snake (ITW Records 01)
- 1984 Rag Odyssey (Meteor Records MTM-006)
- 1984 On The Street of Dreams (ITW Records 03)
- 1986 The Best of Ian Whitcomb (Rhino Records RNLP 127)
- 1986 Oceans of Love (ITW Records 04)
- 1987 Steppin’ Out (Audiophile AP 225)
- 1987 Ian Whitcomb's Ragtime America (Premier PMP 1017)
- 1990 All the Hits Plus More (Prestige/BBC PRST 005)

=== Compact discs ===
- 1988 Happy Days Are Here Again (Audiophile ACD 242)
- 1992 Ian Whitcomb’s Ragtime America (ITW 009)
- 1995 Lotusland—A New Kind of Old-Fashioned Musical Comedy (Audiophile ACD 283)
- 1996 Let the Rest of the World Go By (Audiophile ACD 267)
- 1997 The Golden Age of Lounge (Varèse Sarabande VSD 5821)
- 1997 Ian Whitcomb: You Turn Me On!/Mod Mod Music Hall (Sundazed SC 11044)
- 1997 Titanic: Music as Heard on the Fateful Voyage (Rhino R2 72821)
- 1998 Spread a Little Happiness (Audiophile ACD 249)
- 1998 Titanic Tunes—A Sing-A-Long in Steerage (The Musical Murrays Conducted by Ian Whitcomb) (Varèse Sarabande 5965)
- 1998 Songs from the Titanic Era (The New White Star Orchestra) (Varèse Sarabande VSF 5966)
- 1999 Comedy Songs (Audiophile ACD 163)
- 2001 Sentimentally Yours (Woodpecker Records)
- 2002 Dance Hall Days (ITW Records)
- 2003 Under the Ragtime Moon (Vivid Sound B00008WD18)
- 2005 Old Chestnuts & Rare Treats (ITW Records)
- 2005 Words & Music (ITW Records)
- 2006 Lone Pine Blues (Vivid Sound NACD3229; Japanese import only)
- 2011 Now and Then (Cayenne Music)
- 2011 I Love A Piano (Rivermont BSW-2218) with Adam Swanson
- 2012 Songs Without Words (Rivermont BSW-3136) 2-CD set
- 2014 The Golden Age of Tin Pan Alley (Rivermont BSW-3137) 2-CD set

== Books ==
- 1972 After the Ball: Pop Music from Rag to Rock (Allen Lane/Penguin) ISBN 0-14-003450-1.
- 1973 20th Century Fun Essex Music
- 1975 Tin Pan Alley: A Pictorial History (Paddington Press) ASIN: B000RC8WOC
- 1979 Lotusland: A Story of Southern California (Wildwood House) ISBN 0-7045-3005-8
- 1982 Whole Lotta Shakin’: A Rock ‘n’ Roll Scrapbook (Arrow) ASIN: B000OHDDPI
- 1983 Rock Odyssey: A Chronicle of the Sixties (Doubleday/Anchor) ISBN 0-385-15705-3
- 1986 Irving Berlin & Ragtime America (Arrow) ISBN 0-87910-115-6
- 1990 Resident Alien (Century) ISBN 0-7126-2266-7
- 1994 The Beckoning Fairground: Notes of a British Exile (California Classics) ISBN 1-879395-04-5
- 1994 Treasures of Tin Pan Alley (Mel Bay)
- 1995 Vaudeville Favorites (Mel Bay)
- 1996 The Best of Vintage Dance (Mel Bay)
- 1997 Songs of the Ragtime Era (Mel Bay)
- 1998 The Titanic Songbook (Mel Bay)
- 1998 Titanic Tunes (Mel Bay)
- 1998 Songs of the Jazz Age (Mel Bay)
- 1999 Ukulele Heaven (Mel Bay)
- 2001 Uke Ballads (Mel Bay)
- 2003 The Cat's Meow (Mel Bay)
- 2007 The Ian Whitcomb Songbook (Mel Bay)
- 2009 Letters From Lotusland (Wild Shore Press) ISBN 978-0-578-03610-6
- 2011 Ian Whitcomb's Ukulele Sing-Along (Alfred Music Publishing) ISBN 0-7390-7381-8 (Book & CD)
- 2012 Ukulele Heroes: The Golden Age (Hal Leonard) ISBN 978-1-4584-1654-4

== Appearances ==
=== Screen ===
- 1997 Contact
- 2000 Stanley's Gig
- 2004 Open House
- 2011 6 1/2 Weeks
- 2012 Forbidden Lovers
- 2012 Table For Twelve
- 2012 His Mother's Lover
- 2013 Lesbian One Night Stand
- 2014 His Lover's Son

=== Television ===
- 1965 Thank Your Lucky Stars
- 1965 Shindig
- 1965 Hollywood A Go-Go
- 1965 Shivaree
- 1965 Where the Action Is
- 1967 The Pat Boone Show
- 1971 The Old Grey Whistle Test
- 1973 Today
- 1975 The Tonight Show Starring Johnny Carson
- 1975 The Merv Griffin Show
- 1976 The Late Late Show
- 1977 L.A–My Home Town
- 1979 Tomorrow
- 1985 Don't Say Good Bye, Miss Ragtime
- 1997 The Weird Al Show
- 2010 Ave 43

== Notes ==
1. The New York Times, 26 April 1998.
2. The New York Times, 22 January 1984
