= Macaulay Company =

Defunct American publisher

The Combined Maze by May Sinclair (1913), readable pdf

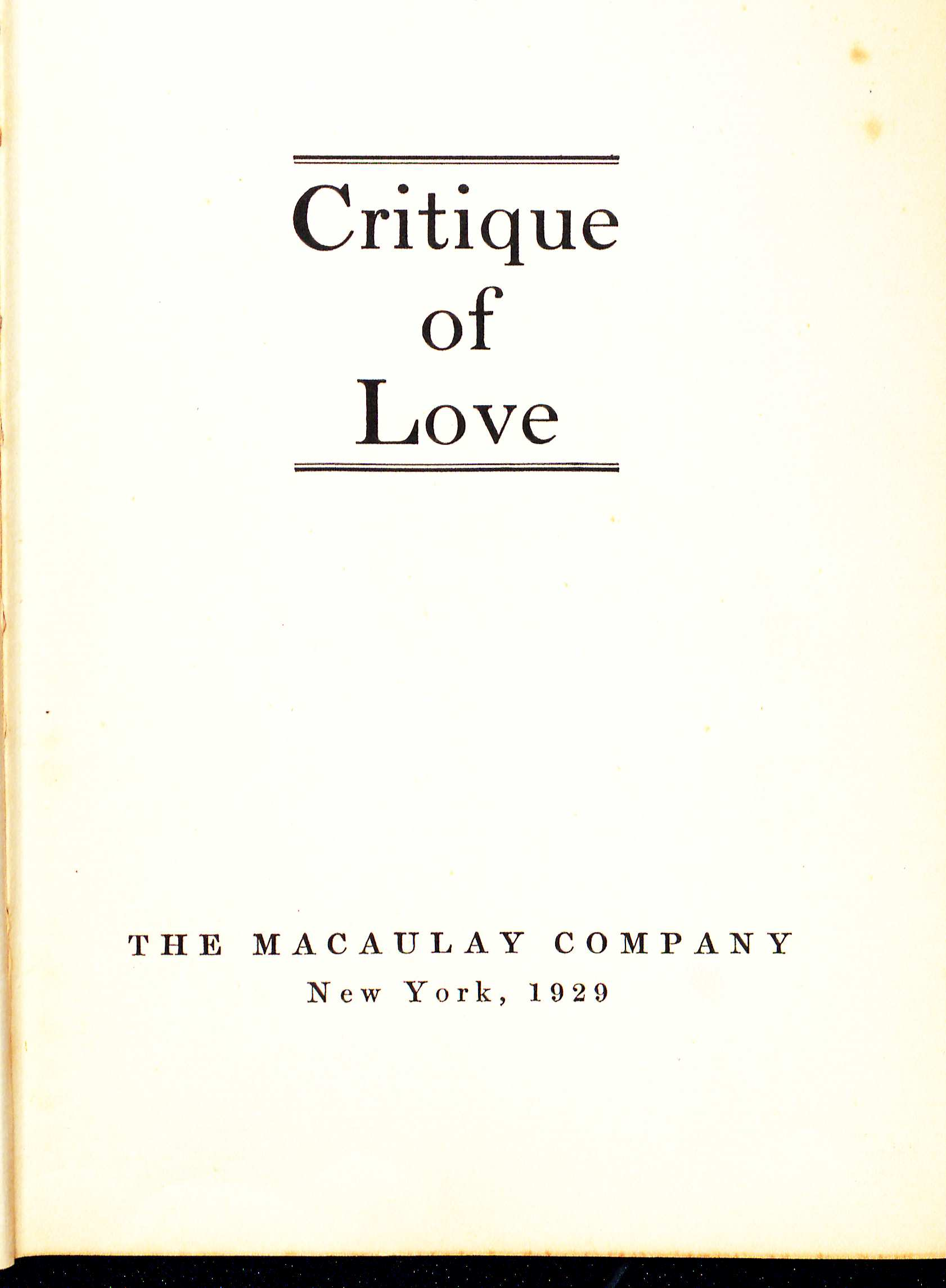
The Critique of Love by Fritz Wittels, cover (1929)

Macaulay Company was a publisher in New York City. It published French and English authors before expanding to American authors. It is known for its publications in the crime, mystery, and romance genres. The Ohio State University Libraries have a collection of its papers.

Wallace Thurman worked at the firm including as editor-in-chief.

L. F. Furman was president and treasurer of the publishing company in 1934 when it faced a strike after laying off five employees. Furman said the layoffs were a result of business conditions. It was involved in a legal dispute with William LaVarre.

Its office was at 257 Fourth Avenue in New York City.

== Books ==
- The Counterpart by Joseph Hornor Coates (1909)
- The Game of the Golden Ball (1910)
- The Princess of Forge (1910)
- The City of Silent Men by John A. Moroso (1913)
- The Combined Maze by May Sinclair (1913)
- At Bay (1914)
- Whoso findeth a wife by J. Wesley Putnam (1914)
- Secret of the Night by Gaston Leroux (1914) illustrated by Henry Richard Boehm
- The Family Cupboard, a novel (1914)
- The American Caravan, a yearbook of American literature edited by Van Wyck Brooks.
- The River Riders by Walter W. Liggett
- The Natural Law (1916)
- The Girl by the Roadside (1917)
- EVE, Junior by Reginald Heber Patterson (1917)
- The Invisible Enemy (1918)
- Flames of the Blue Ridge (1919)
- Stretton Street Affair by William Le Queux (1922)
- Sisterly Competition Rivalry by Sarah Warder MacConnell (1927)
- IT by Elinor Glyn (1927)
- Moussia: the life and death of Marie Bashkirtseff (1929)
- Show Boy, a novel by M. Coates Webster (1931)
- Machine to Kill by Gaston Leroux (1935)
