= Mae West =

American actress and singer (1893–1980)

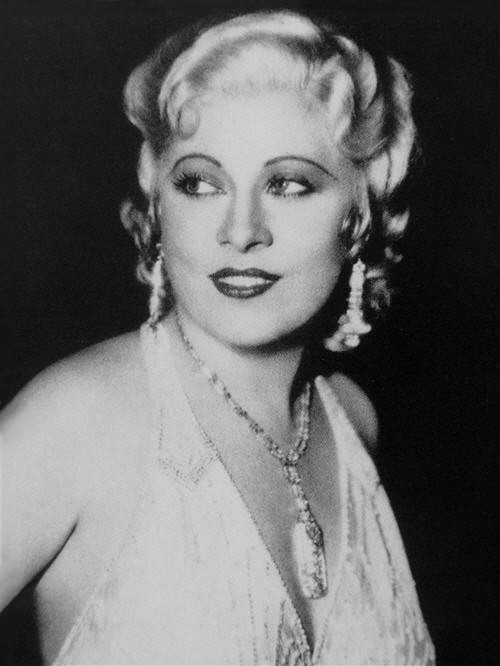
- West in 1932
- Born: Mary Jane West; August 17, 1893; Brooklyn, New York, U.S.
- Died: November 22, 1980 (aged 87); Los Angeles, California, U.S.
- Resting place: Cypress Hills Cemetery, New York City
- Occupations: Actress; singer; comedian; screenwriter; playwright
- Years active: 1907–1979
- Spouse: Frank Wallace (m. 1911; div. 1943)
- Partner: Paul Novak (1954–1980)

Mary Jane West (August 17, 1893 – November 22, 1980), known as Mae West, was an American actress, singer, comedian, screenwriter, and playwright. Recognized as a prominent sex symbol of her time, she was known for portraying sexually confident characters and for her use of double entendres, often delivering her lines in a distinctive contralto voice. With a career spanning more than seven decades, she was frequently associated with controversies over censorship and once stated, "I believe in censorship. I made a fortune out of it." West is listed as one of the top 25 female movie stars of all time in the American Film Institute's survey AFI's 100 Years...100 Stars. For her contribution to the motion picture industry, she received a star on the Hollywood Walk of Fame.

West began performing in vaudeville and on stage in New York before moving on to film in Los Angeles. By 1933, she was one of the largest box-office draws in the U.S. and, by 1935, she was also the highest paid woman and the second-highest paid person in the U.S. (after William Randolph Hearst). Censorship had increasingly made West's sexually suggestive humor difficult to sustain on screen. She was included in the "Box Office Poison" list published by the Independent Theatre Owners Association in 1938. Among her film credits include Night After Night (1932; her motion picture debut), She Done Him Wrong and I'm No Angel (both 1933), Belle of the Nineties (1934), Go West, Young Man (1936), My Little Chickadee (1940), The Heat's On (1943), and Myra Breckinridge (1970). As her movie career declined, she remained active by writing books and plays, performing in Las Vegas and London, and appearing on radio and television shows. In later years, West also released rock and roll records, including the studio albums Way Out West (1966) and Great Balls of Fire (1972). Her final film role was in the musical comedy Sextette (1978).

In August 1980, West tripped while getting out of bed, which contributed to her death three months later at age 87.

== Early life ==
Mary Jane West was born on August 17, 1893, in either the Greenpoint or Bushwick neighborhood of Brooklyn, New York, before the consolidation of New York City. She was delivered at home by her aunt, a midwife. She was the eldest surviving child of Mathilde Delker (originally "Doelger" and later Americanized to "Delker" or "Dilker") West, a corset and fashion model, and John Patrick "Battlin' Jack" West, a former prizefighter who later worked as a "special policeman" and founded a private investigation agency.

Her mother, known as "Tillie" or "Matilda", was a German immigrant from Bavaria, who arrived in 1886 with her siblings and parents, Christiana (née Brüning) and Jakob Doelger. West's paternal grandmother, Mary Jane (née Copley), was of Irish descent, and her paternal grandfather, John Edwin West, was of English and Scottish ancestry. Her parents married in Brooklyn on January 18, 1889. According to reports, the groom's parents approved of the union, while the bride's family opposed it. They raised their children in the Protestant faith.

West's eldest sister, Katie, died in infancy. Her surviving siblings were Mildred Katherine "Beverly" West and John Edwin West II (often incorrectly referred to as "Jr."). During her childhood, the family lived in various areas of Woodhaven, Queens and the Williamsburg and Greenpoint neighborhoods of Brooklyn, all of which were consolidated into New York City during that period. West may have first performed publicly at Neir's Social Hall in Woodhaven.

== Career ==
=== Beginning of stage career ===
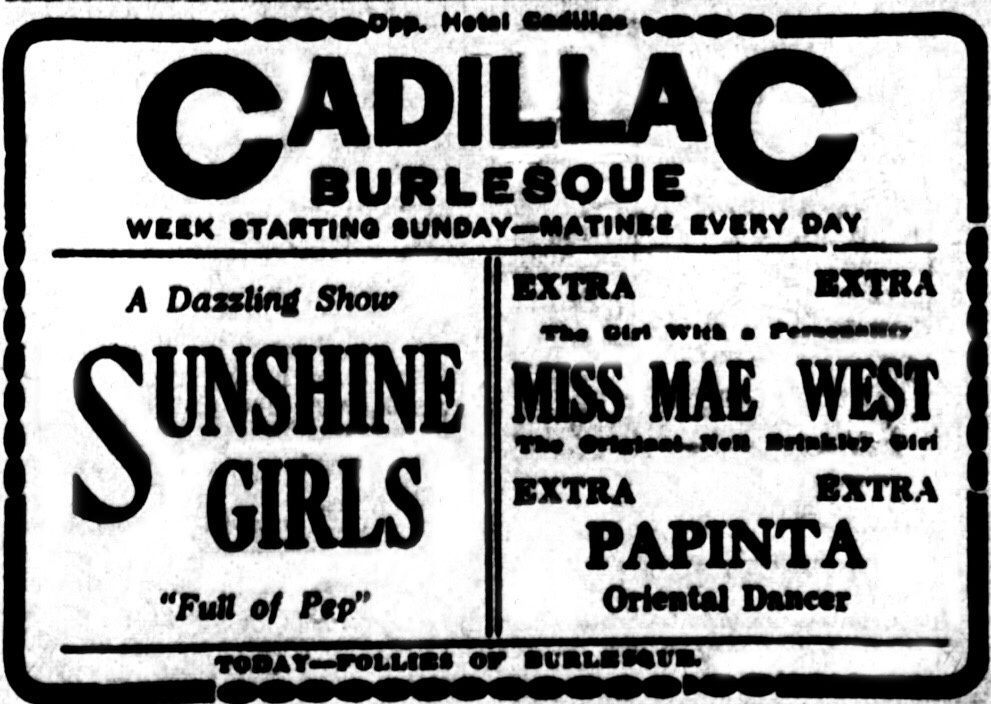
Newspaper ad for burlesque show with West, "The Girl With a Personality", Detroit, Michigan, 1915

West was five when she first entertained a crowd at a church social, and she began appearing in amateur shows at the age of seven. She frequently won prizes at local talent contests. She began performing professionally in vaudeville in the Hal Clarendon Stock Company in 1907, at the age of 14. As a child performer, West used the stage name "Baby Mae" (the baby may behave like this), and later tried various personas, including a male impersonator.

Early in her career, she sometimes used the alias "Jane Mast". Her distinctive walk was said to have been inspired or influenced by female impersonators Bert Savoy and Julian Eltinge, who were prominent during the Pansy Craze.

West made her first appearance in a Broadway show in 1911, at age 18, in a revue titled A La Broadway staged by her former dancing teacher, Ned Wayburn. The show closed after only eight performances, but West was praised in a New York Times review, which noted that "a girl named Mae West, hitherto unknown, pleased by her grotesquerie and snappy way of singing and dancing". She next appeared in Vera Violetta, which also featured Al Jolson, and in 1912, she played La Petite Daffy, a "baby vamp", in A Winsome Widow.

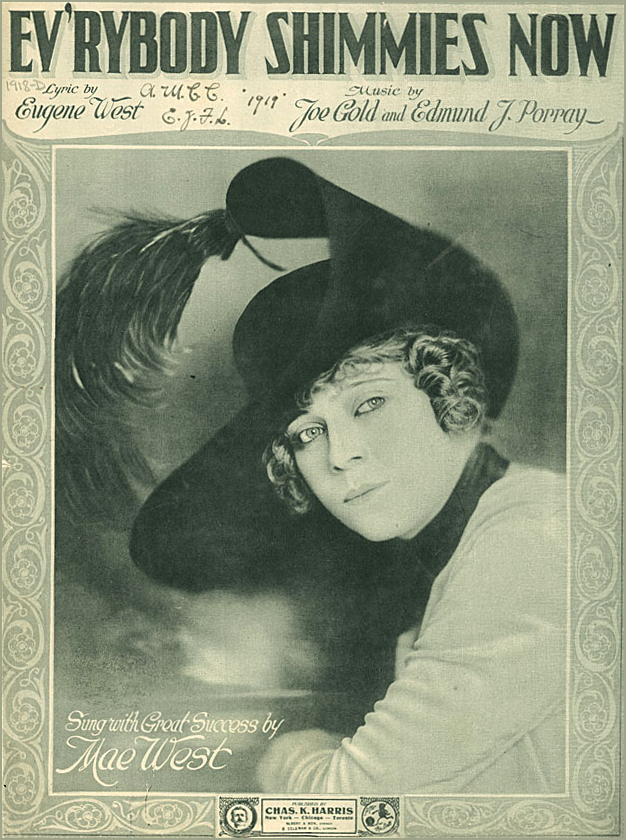
Cover of "Ev'rybody Shimmies Now" sheet music with West's portrait, 1918

West continued to build her career in vaudeville, appearing in circuits such as that run by Gus Sun of Ohio. She credited her mother as a constant supporter who believed everything Mae did was "fantastic", though other family members—including an aunt and her paternal grandmother—disapproved of her performing career. In 1918, West gained significant attention in the Shubert Brothers revue Sometime, starring opposite Ed Wynn. Her character, Mayme, danced the shimmy, and her photograph was featured on the sheet music for the popular number "Ev'rybody Shimmies Now".

=== Broadway stardom and jail ===
Eventually, West began writing her own risqué plays using the pen name Jane Mast. Her first starring role on Broadway was in the 1926 play Sex, which she wrote, produced, and directed. Although conservative critics panned the show, ticket sales were strong. The production did not go over well with city officials, who had received complaints from religious groups, and the theater was raided and West arrested along with the cast. She was taken to the Jefferson Market Court House, where she was prosecuted on morals charges, and on April 19, 1927, she was sentenced to 10 days for "corrupting the morals of youth". Though West could have paid a fine and been released, she chose the jail sentence for the publicity it would garner. While incarcerated on Welfare Island, she dined with the warden and his wife and told reporters she had worn her silk panties while serving time, instead of the "burlap" issued to other inmates. She served eight days, with two days off for good behavior, and afterward told reporters that her play was "a work of art". Media attention surrounding the incident enhanced her career, with reporters dubbing her a "bad girl" who "had climbed the ladder of success wrong by wrong".

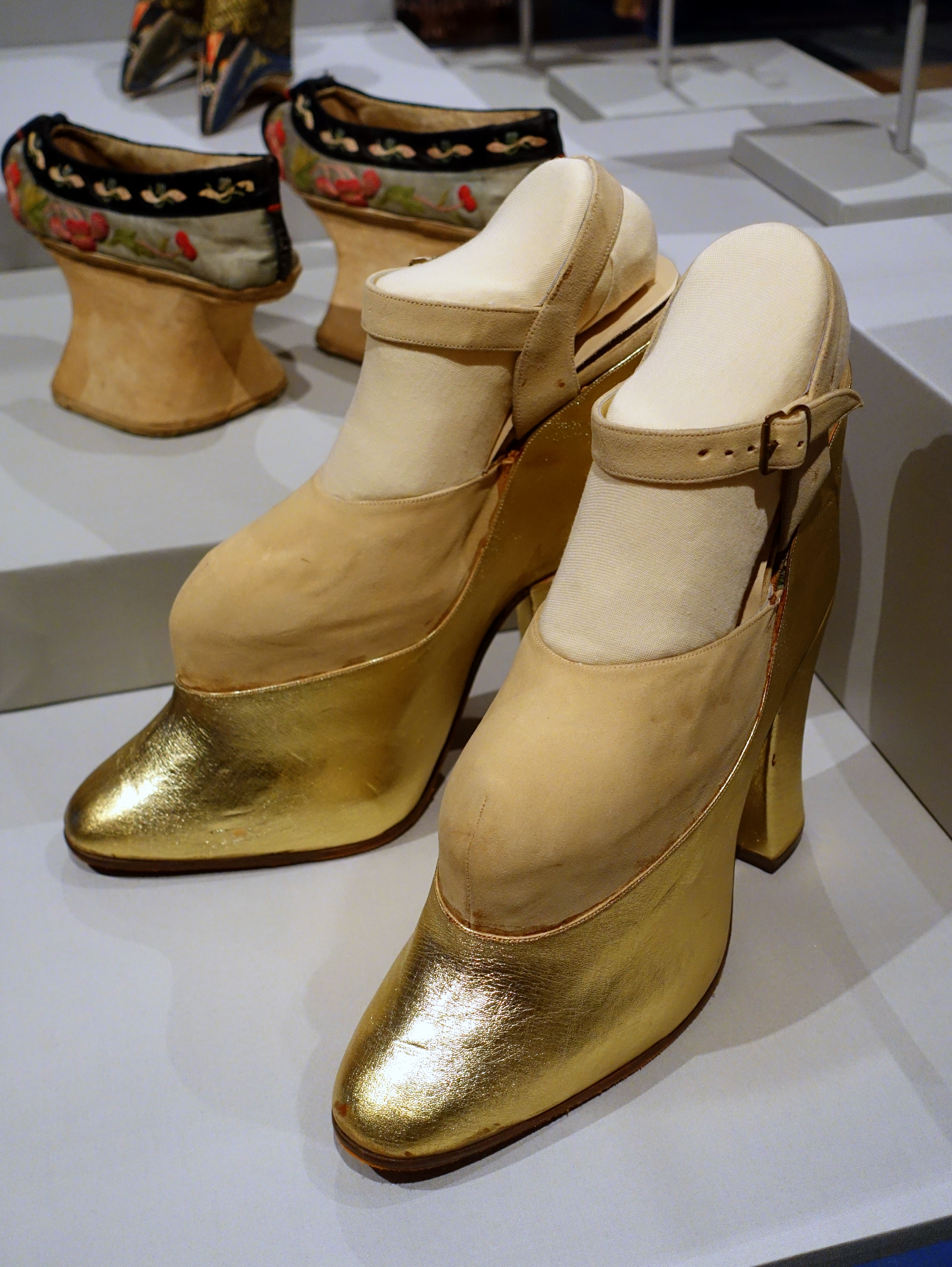
A pair of "trick" platform shoes worn by West in films to make her look taller, which also contributed to her unique gait

Her next play, The Drag, dealt with homosexuality and was what West called one of her "comedy-dramas of life". After a series of try-outs in Connecticut and New Jersey, West announced she would open the play in New York. However, The Drag never opened on Broadway, owing to efforts by the New York Society for the Suppression of Vice to ban any attempt by West to stage it. West explained, "The city fathers begged me not to bring the show to New York because they were not equipped to handle the commotion it would cause." West was an early supporter of the women's liberation movement, though she said she was not a "burn your bra" type of feminist. Since the 1920s, she also supported gay rights and spoke publicly against police brutality toward gay men. She expressed the then-modern belief that gay men were women's souls in men's bodies, and said that hitting a gay man was akin to hitting a woman.

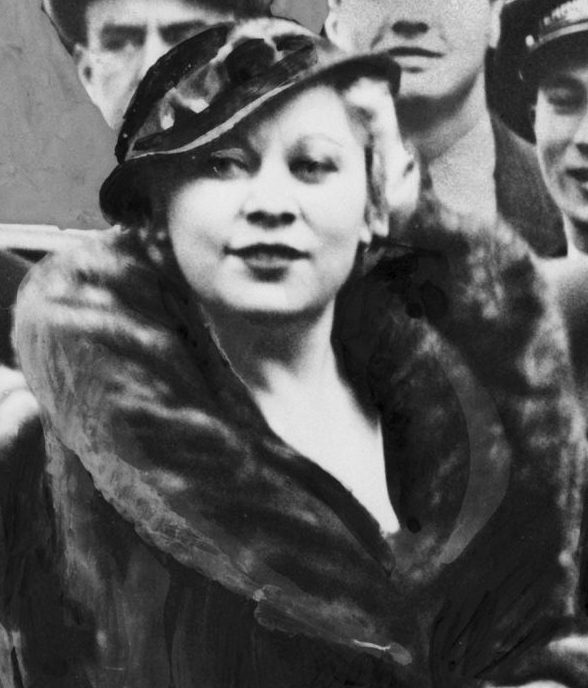
"Diamond Lil" returning to New York from California, 1933

In her 1959 autobiography, Goodness Had Nothing to Do With It, ghostwritten by Stephen Longstreet, West condemned hypocrisy while also voicing concerns about homosexuality:

I have always hated the two-faced, the smoother-over folk — the people who preach loudly one way of life, and then do something in private that they're against in public. In many ways homosexuality is a danger to the entire social system of western civilization...

This perspective seems at odds with her later statements, such as in her 1975 book Mae West: Sex, Health, and ESP, in which she wrote:

I believe that the world owes male and female homosexuals more understanding than we've given them. Live and let live is my philosophy on the subject, and I believe everybody has the right to do his or her own thing or somebody else's — as long as they do it all in private!

Between the late 1920s and early 1930s, West continued to write plays, including The Wicked Age, Pleasure Man, and The Constant Sinner. These productions stirred controversy, which helped keep West in the headlines and filled seats at performances. Her 1928 play Diamond Lil, a story about a racy but clever lady of the 1890s, became a Broadway hit. West revived it many times throughout her career.

Three years later, she played Babe Gordon in The Constant Sinner, which opened at the Royale Theatre on September 14, 1931. New York Times critic Brooks Atkinson gave the show a scathing review:

...The Constant Sinner commits one of the major sins in the theatre; it is dull... "The Constant Sinner" is also, as might be expected, vile as to speech... Her peculiar slouching about the stage... her vocal stunts, her exploitation of blond buxomness—all these grow pretty tiresome through repetition.

Other critics similarly dismissed the play as "clumsy", "deliberately outlandish", and referred to West as an "atrocious playwright". The play closed after 64 performances. Compared to Diamond Lil, which ran for 323 performances, The Constant Sinner was a disappointment. Still, its notoriety enhanced West's public image as a daring and provocative performer. Soon afterward, she accepted a contract from Paramount Pictures to begin her Hollywood film career.

=== Motion pictures and censorship ===
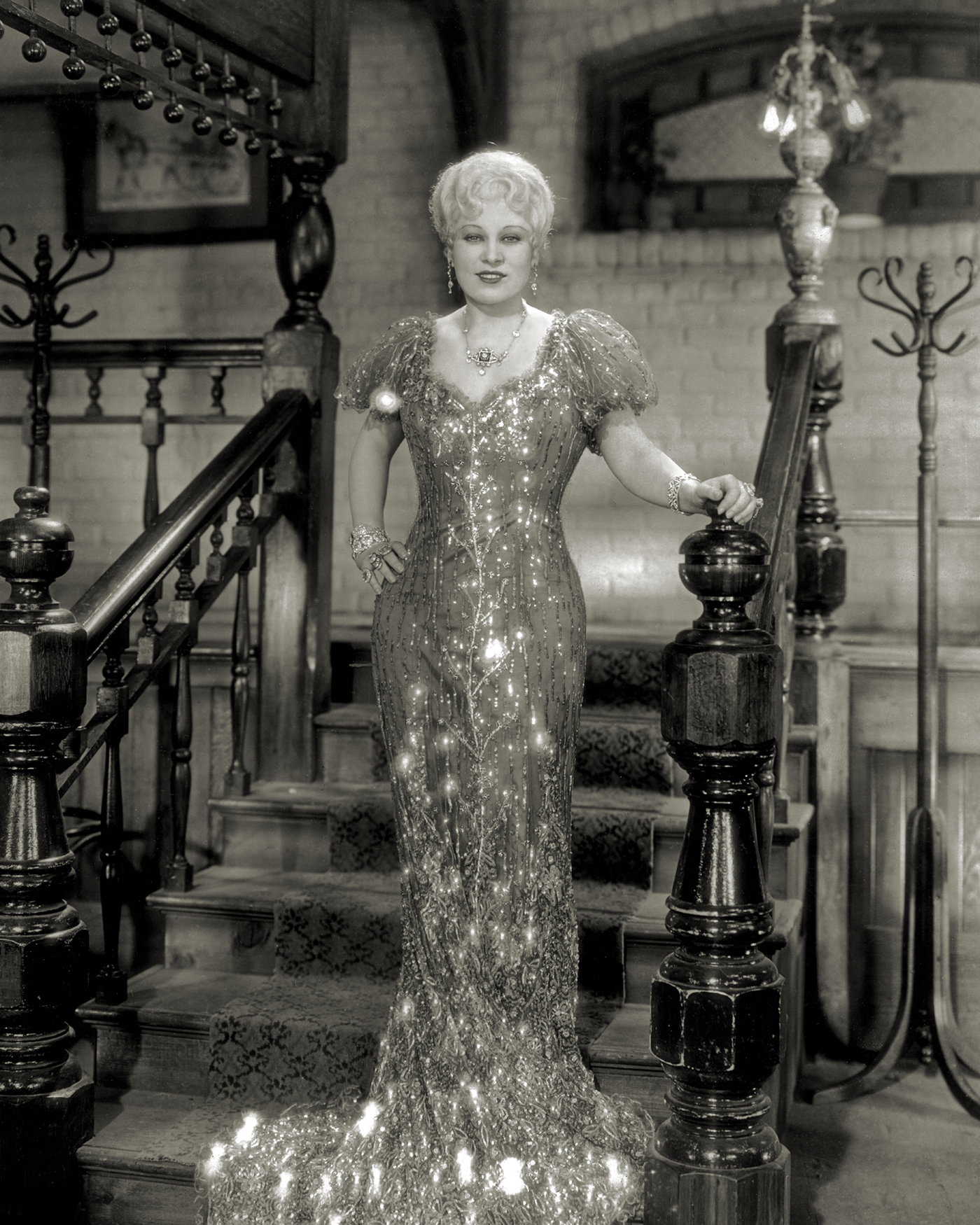
West in She Done Him Wrong (1933)

In June 1932, after signing a two-month contract with Paramount Pictures that provided her a weekly salary of $5,000 ($110,000 in 2023), West left New York by train for California. The veteran stage performer was by then nearly 40-years-old, yet managed to keep her age ambiguous for some time. She made her film debut in the role of Maudie Triplett in Night After Night (1932) starring George Raft, who had suggested West for the part. She did not like her small supporting role in the drama at first, but was appeased when she was allowed to rewrite portions of her character's dialogue. The character had been modeled after Texas Guinan. One of several revisions she made is in her first scene in Night After Night, when a hat-check girl exclaims, "Goodness, what beautiful diamonds," and West replies, "Goodness had nothing to do with it, dearie." Reflecting on the overall result of her rewritten scenes, Raft is reported to have said, "She stole everything but the cameras."

For her next role for Paramount, West brought her "Diamond Lil" character, now rechristened "Lady Lou", to the screen in She Done Him Wrong (1933). The film was one of Cary Grant's early major roles, which boosted his career. West claimed she spotted Grant at the studio and insisted that he be cast as the male lead. She claimed to have told a Paramount director, "If he can talk, I'll take him!" West's persistence as having "discovered" Grant has since been disputed, as he had made films with Marlene Dietrich, Tallulah Bankhead, and Sylvia Sidney the year before. She Done Him Wrong was a box office hit and earned an Academy Award nomination for Best Picture. The success of the film almost single-handedly saved Paramount from bankruptcy, grossing over $2 million (the equivalent of $46 million in 2023). Paramount recognizes that debt of gratitude today, with a building on the lot named after West.

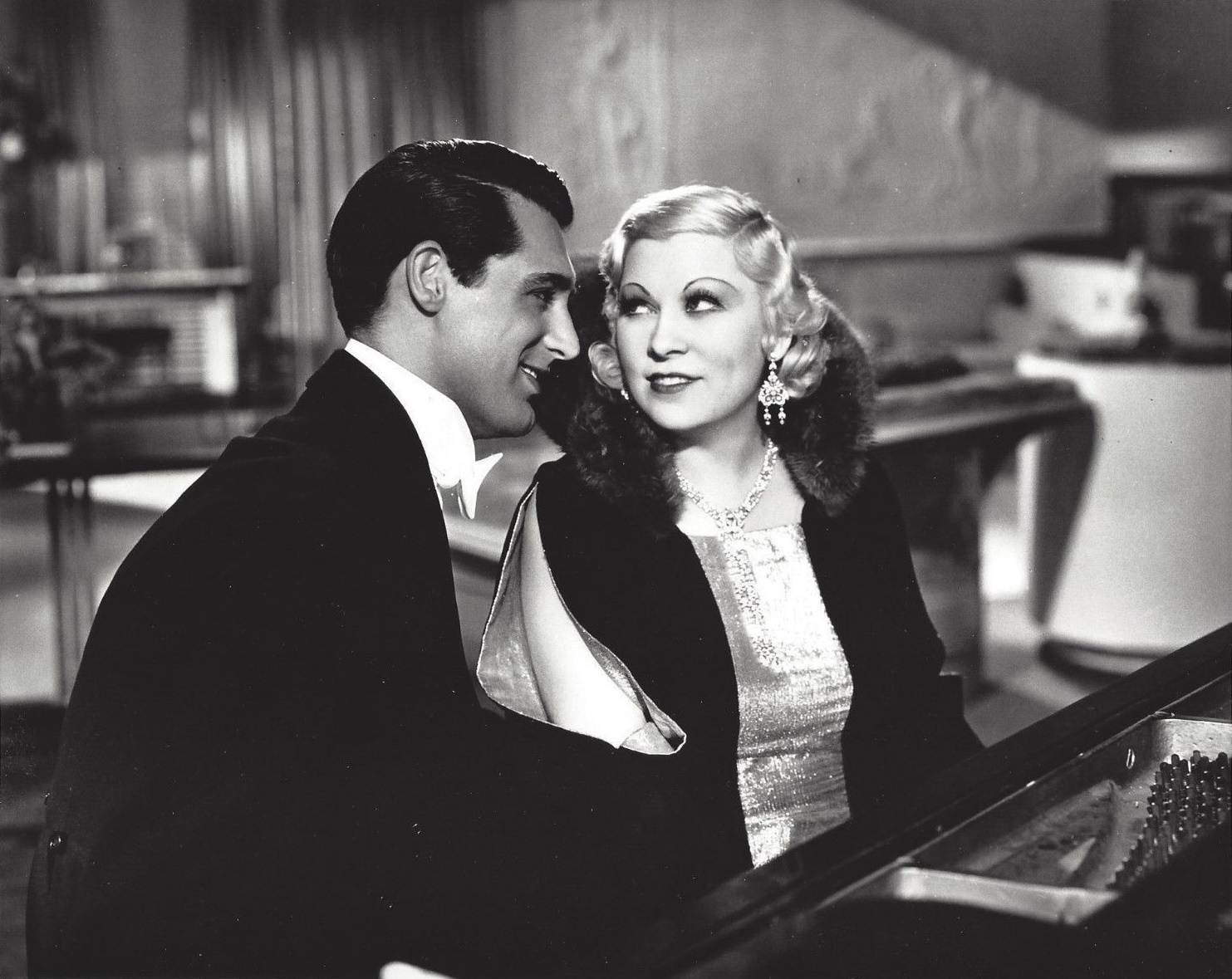
West in I'm No Angel (1933), her second film with Cary Grant

Her next release, I'm No Angel (1933), teamed her again with Cary Grant. The film was also a box office hit and was the most successful of her entire screen career, with a gross of more than $2.2 million. In the months after its release, references to West could be found almost everywhere, from the song lyrics of Cole Porter, to a Works Progress Administration (WPA) mural of San Francisco's newly built Coit Tower, to She Done Him Right, a Pooch the Pup cartoon, to My Dress Hangs There, a painting by Mexican artist Frida Kahlo. Kahlo's husband, Diego Rivera, paid his own tribute: "West is the most wonderful machine for living I have ever known—unfortunately on the screen only." To F. Scott Fitzgerald, West was especially unique: "The only Hollywood actress with both an ironic edge and a comic spark." As Variety put it, "Mae West's films have made her the biggest conversation-provoker, free-space grabber, and all-around box office bet in the country. She's as hot an issue as Hitler."

West on the cover of Picture Play magazine in April 1934

By 1933, West was one of the largest box office draws in the United States and, by 1935, she was also the highest paid woman and the second-highest paid person in the United States―after William Randolph Hearst. Hearst invited West to Hearst Castle, his massive estate in San Simeon, California, where Hollywood celebrities and prominent political and business figures frequently gathered to socialize. "I could'a married him," West later commented, "but I got no time for parties. I don't like those big crowds."

On July 1, 1934, the censorship guidelines of the film industry's Production Code began to be meticulously enforced. As a result, West's scripts were subjected to more editing. She, in turn, would often intentionally place extremely risqué lines in her scripts, knowing they would be cut by the censors. She hoped they would then not object as much to her other less suggestive lines. Her next film was Belle of the Nineties (1934), whose original title, It Ain't No Sin, was changed at the insistence of the censors. Despite Paramount's early objections regarding costs, West insisted the studio hire Duke Ellington and his orchestra to accompany her in the film's musical numbers. Their collaboration was a success, and the classic "My Old Flame" was introduced in this film. Despite multiple changes to the script and story, Belle of the Nineties was popular with audiences. Her follow-up, Goin' to Town (1935), received mixed reviews, as censorship continued to insist that West's suggestive dialogue be watered-down or removed entirely. The film was West's first to show a decline in box office returns.

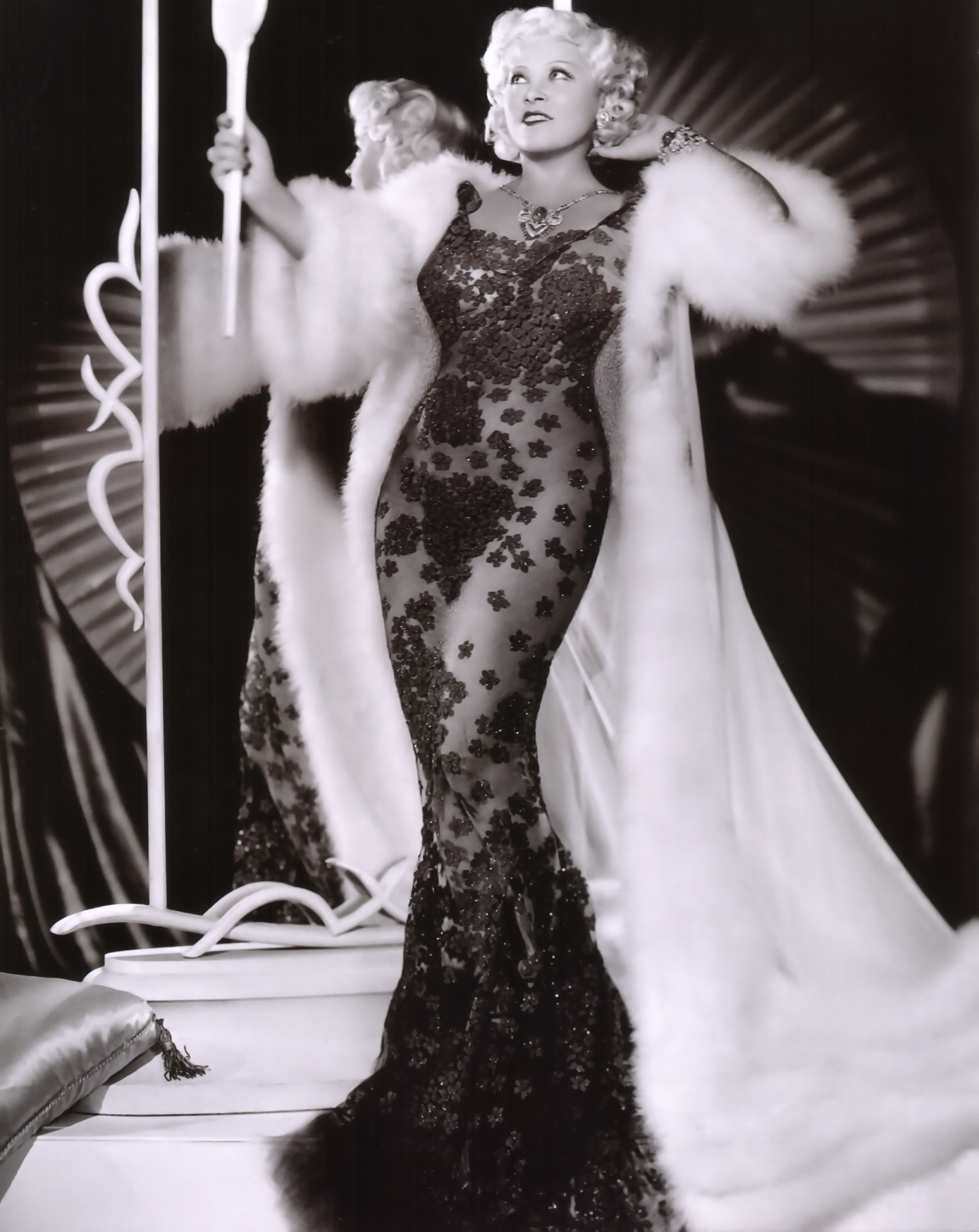
West in a promotional photo for Go West, Young Man (1936)

Her following effort, Klondike Annie (1936), dealt, as best it could given the heavy censorship, with religion and hypocrisy. Some critics called the film her magnum opus, but the overall response was mixed. Press baron William Randolph Hearst, offended by a remark West made about his mistress Marion Davies, sent a private memo to his editors stating: "That Mae West picture Klondike Annie is a filthy picture... DO NOT ACCEPT ANY ADVERTISING OF THIS PICTURE." Paramount executives felt they had to tone down West's characterization. "I was the first liberated woman, you know. No guy was going to get the best of me. That's what I wrote all my scripts about." Klondike Annie was just a reasonable success with audiences. Even so, the film has since been reexamined, with some historians considering it West's screen masterpiece. West later privately admitted the film to be her favorite, although she was disappointed in the censorship edits.

West next played opposite Randolph Scott in Go West, Young Man (1936), adapting Lawrence Riley's Broadway hit Personal Appearance into a screenplay tailored to her. She played a fictional movie star, who is stranded in a rural area, and who falls for one of the locals. Directed by Henry Hathaway, it is considered one of West's weaker films of the era due to censor cuts. She then starred in Every Day's a Holiday (1937), which was her final film for Paramount. Her contract with the studio ended the following year. Censorship restrictions had increasingly made West's sexually suggestive humor difficult to sustain on screen. The novelty of her image had worn off, and her career declined as a result. Around the time of her dismissal from Paramount, West―along with Greta Garbo, Joan Crawford, Marlene Dietrich, Katharine Hepburn, and others―was proclaimed "box office poison", a label she rebuffed. "Why, the independent theater owners call me the mortgage-lifter," West is to have stated, "When business is bad, they just rerun one of my pictures." That same year, independent producer David O. Selznick offered her the role of Belle Watling in Gone with the Wind, but West declined, saying it was too small and she would need the authority to rewrite her dialogue.

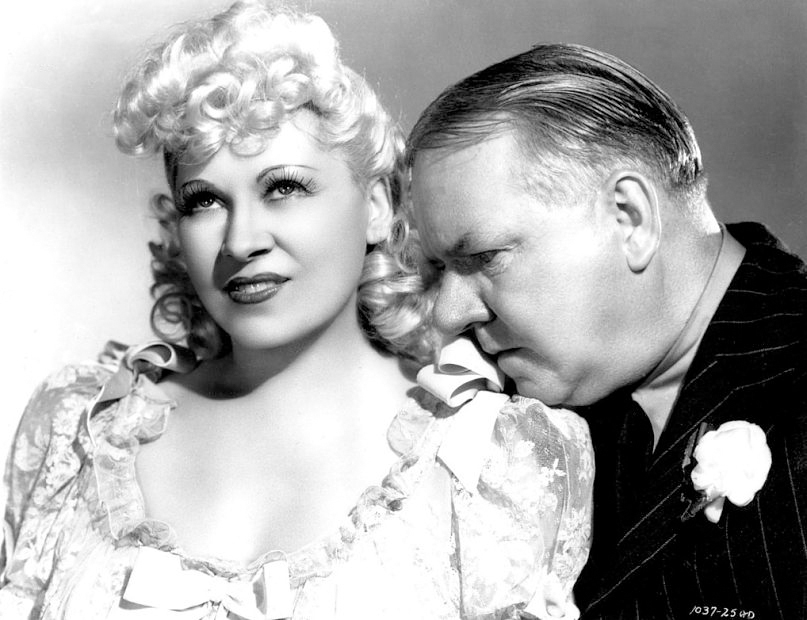
West and W. C. Fields in a promotional photo for My Little Chickadee (1940)

Universal Pictures approached West to star alongside W. C. Fields in My Little Chickadee (1940). Although West and Fields had a combative relationship, with West disapproving of Fields as her leading man and there being disagreements over screen credits and the rewriting of certain scenes and dialogue. Religious leaders condemned West's on-screen persona, taking offense at lines such as: "When I'm caught between two evils, I generally like to take the one I never tried." A classic example of Western comedy, the film is often heralded as one of West's best, and was a big box office success at the time of release.

West's final film of the period was The Heat's On (1943), produced by Columbia Pictures. She only agreed to star as a personal favor to director Gregory Ratoff, who needed West for her "name value" to secure the funding for the production. It was the only film where she was not given the creative control to rewrite her scenes and dialogue. The result was poorly received, and West later cited her frustration with censorship as a key reason for her departure from filmmaking. Instead, she found continued success in nightclubs, stage shows, and Broadway revivals where she retained creative control over her performances.

=== Radio and censorship ===
On December 12, 1937, West appeared in two separate sketches on ventriloquist Edgar Bergen's radio show The Chase and Sanborn Hour. Appearing as herself, West flirted with Charlie McCarthy, Bergen's dummy, using her usual brand of wit and risqué sexual references. West referred to Charlie as "all wood and a yard long" and commented, "Charles, I remember our last date, and have the splinters to prove it!" West was on the verge of being banned from radio.

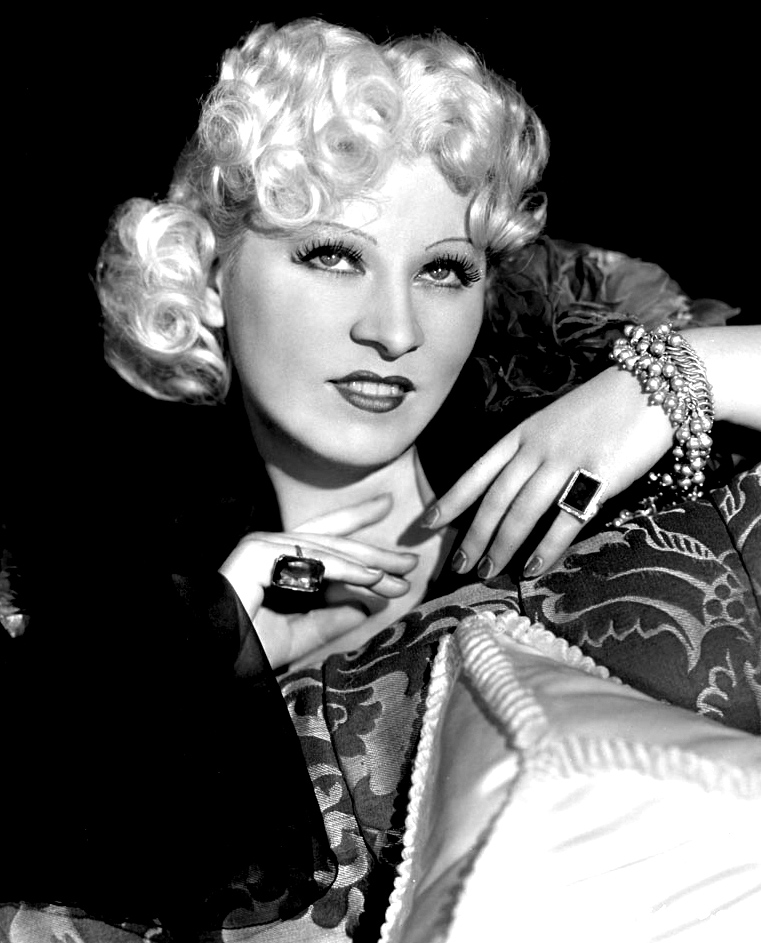
Publicity photo, 1936

Another controversial sketch aired the same night on NBC, written by Arch Oboler, and featured Don Ameche and West as Adam and Eve in the Garden of Eden. She tells Ameche to "get me a big one... I feel like doin' a big apple!" This ostensible reference to the then-current dance craze was one of the many double entendres in the dialogue. Days after the broadcast, the studio received letters calling the show "immoral" and "obscene". Several conservative women's clubs and religious groups admonished the show's sponsor, Chase & Sanborn Coffee Company, for "prostituting" their services for allowing "impurity [to] invade the air".

Under pressure, the Federal Communications Commission later deemed the broadcast "vulgar and indecent" and "far below even the minimum standard which should control in the selection and production of broadcast programs". Some debate existed regarding the reaction to the skit. Conservative religious groups took umbrage far more swiftly than the mainstream. These groups found it easy to make West their target. They took exception to her outspoken use of sexuality and sexual imagery, which she had employed in her career since at least the pre-Code films of the early 1930s and for decades before on Broadway, but which was now being broadcast into American living rooms on a popular family-friendly radio program. The groups reportedly warned the sponsor of the program they would protest her appearance.

NBC Radio banned West (and the mention of her name) from their stations following the backlash. She did not return to radio until January 1950, when she appeared on an episode of The Chesterfield Supper Club, hosted by Perry Como. Ameche's career did not suffer any serious repercussions, however, as he was playing the "straight" character. West subsequently continued to perform in venues such as Lou Walters's The Latin Quarter, Broadway, and London.

=== Middle years ===
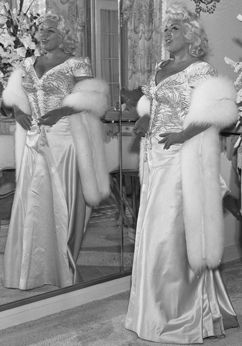
Featured in the Los Angeles Times, 1953

After appearing in The Heat's On in 1943, West returned to the stage and nightclubs. She played the title role in Catherine Was Great (1944) on Broadway, a play she wrote as a satirical take on the life of Catherine the Great. In the production, she surrounded herself with a group of tall, muscular actors described as an "imperial guard". Produced by theater and film impresario Mike Todd, the play ran for 191 performances before going on tour.

West revived her 1928 play Diamond Lil in 1949, returning it to Broadway. A reviewer for The New York Times referred to her as an "American institution—as beloved and indestructible as Donald Duck. Like Chinatown, and Grant's Tomb, Mae West should be seen at least once." In the 1950s, she performed in her own Las Vegas stage show at the newly opened Sahara Hotel, where she sang while flanked by bodybuilders. The show proved popular with both male and female audiences, with West commenting, "Men come to see me, but I also give the women something to see: wall to wall men."

During the casting of Billy Wilder's 1950 film Sunset Boulevard, West was offered the role of Norma Desmond. Still frustrated by the censorship imposed on The Heat's On, she turned down the role, saying its pathos did not fit her desire to uplift audiences. The role went to Gloria Swanson, after Mary Pickford also declined.

West turned down other film roles: Vera Simpson opposite Frank Sinatra in Pal Joey (1957), played instead by Rita Hayworth; a part alongside Elvis Presley in Roustabout (1964), taken by Barbara Stanwyck; and offers from Federico Fellini for both Juliet of the Spirits and Satyricon.

=== Television and the next generations ===
On March 26, 1958, West appeared at the live televised Academy Awards and performed the song "Baby, It's Cold Outside" with Rock Hudson, which received a standing ovation. In 1959, she released an autobiography, Goodness Had Nothing to Do With It, which became a best-seller. West made several television appearances to promote the book, including on The Dean Martin Variety Show in 1959 and The Red Skelton Show in 1960. She also recorded a lengthy interview for Person to Person with Charles Collingwood in 1959, which was ultimately not broadcast; CBS executives reportedly felt viewers were not prepared to see a nude marble statue of West that appeared in the segment. In 1964, she guest-starred on the sitcom Mister Ed. In 1976, she appeared on a CBS special, Back Lot U.S.A., hosted by Dick Cavett, where she was interviewed and performed two songs.

=== Recording career ===
West's recording career began in the early 1930s with releases of songs from her films on 78 rpm records. These were issued alongside sheet music for home use. In 1955, she recorded her first LP album, The Fabulous Mae West. In 1965, she recorded two songs, "Am I Too Young" and "He's Good for Me", for a 45 rpm single released by Plaza Records. She also recorded novelty songs such as "Santa, Come Up to See Me", featured on the album Wild Christmas, which was later reissued in 1980 as Mae in December. In 1966, she released the rock-and-roll album Way Out West, followed in 1972 by Great Balls of Fire, which included covers of songs by The Doors and tracks written by English songwriter-producer Ian Whitcomb.

=== Later years ===
West's likeness was used on the front cover of the Beatles' 1967 album Sgt. Pepper's Lonely Hearts Club Band. When approached for permission, West initially declined, reportedly asking, "What would I be doing in a Lonely Hearts Club?" She changed her mind after receiving a letter from the band expressing admiration for her work.

After a 27-year absence from motion pictures, West returned to the screen as Leticia Van Allen in Myra Breckinridge (1970), based on the controversial novel by Gore Vidal. The film starred Raquel Welch, Rex Reed, Farrah Fawcett, and Tom Selleck, but was hampered by production difficulties, a poor critical reception, and was ultimately a box office bomb. Though West received top billing, her role was reduced during post-production. The film has routinely been labeled one of the worst ever made. In 1971, she was voted "Woman of the Century" by students at University of California, Los Angeles (UCLA) for her outspokenness on sexuality and censorship.

West in her Los Angeles apartment (1973)

In 1975, West released the books Sex, Health, and ESP and Pleasure Man, the latter based on her 1928 stage play. Her 1959 autobiography, Goodness Had Nothing to Do With It, was also updated and reissued during this period. She managed her own stage acts and invested in real estate, including property in Van Nuys, Los Angeles.

That year, she began production on her final film, Sextette (1978), based on a script she had written in 1959. Because her eyesight was failing and the script was frequently revised, her lines were fed to her through a speaker concealed in her wig. Director Ken Hughes later said she was determined to finish the film. Sextette was not a commercial success. Its cast included George Raft, Tony Curtis, Timothy Dalton, Walter Pidgeon, Ringo Starr, Alice Cooper, Dom DeLuise, and Rona Barrett, along with several of West's former Las Vegas performers, such as Reg Lewis. The film reunited her with costume designer Edith Head, who had worked on She Done Him Wrong in 1933.

West was awarded a star on the Hollywood Walk of Fame at 1560 Vine Street for her work in film and was later inducted into the American Theater Hall of Fame for her contributions to stage performance.

== Public image ==
Mae West was known for her distinctive appearance, often characterized by figure-hugging, floor-length gowns with low necklines. Her style typically featured details such as fishtail trains and feather trim, which became associated with her on-screen persona.

== Personal life ==
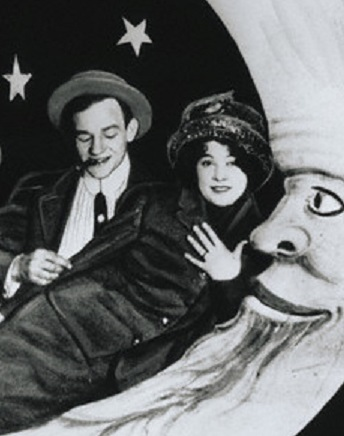
West and husband Frank Wallace in 1911

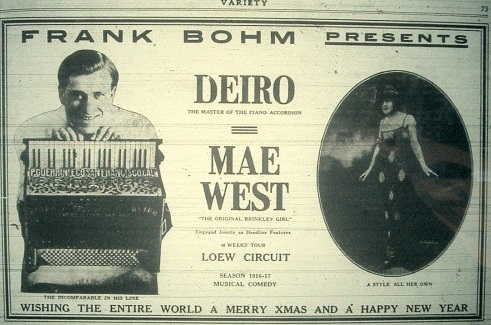
West (right) in an ad with Deiro, c. 1916–17

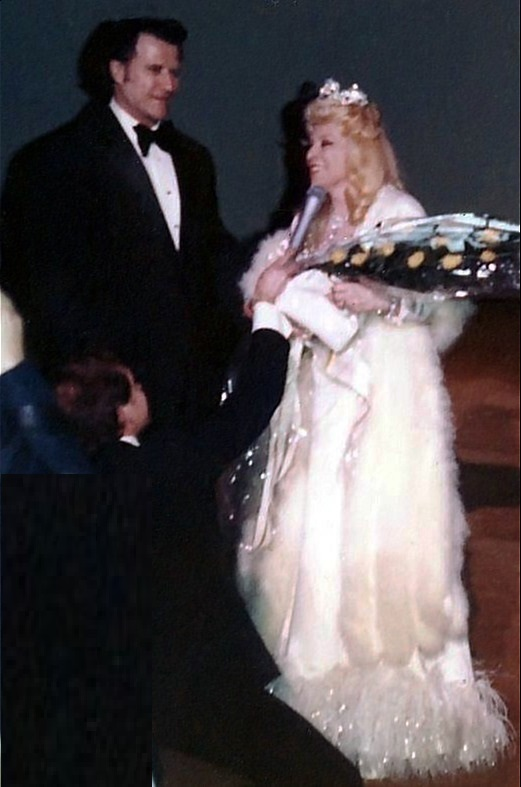
West in 1978 with Paul Novak, her partner of 25 years

West was married on April 11, 1911, in Milwaukee, Wisconsin, to Frank Szatkus (1892–1966), whose stage name was Frank Wallace, a fellow vaudevillian whom she met in 1909. She was 17. She kept the marriage a secret, but a filing clerk discovered the certificate in 1935 and alerted the press. The clerk also uncovered an affidavit from her 1927 Sex trial, in which she had declared herself married. At first, West denied the marriage but admitted it in July 1937 in response to a legal interrogatory. The couple never lived together as husband and wife; she stated they had separate bedrooms and soon sent him away to headline his own show. She obtained a divorce on July 21, 1942, during which Wallace withdrew his request for separate maintenance, and West testified that they had lived together for only "several weeks". The final divorce decree was granted on May 7, 1943.

In 1913, West met Guido Deiro (1886–1950), an Italian-born vaudeville star and accordionist. According to his son, Guido Roberto Deiro, West married Deiro in 1914, though this has not been conclusively proven. Their relationship reportedly ended after West had an abortion at her mother's urging, which left her infertile and nearly killed her. West later quipped, "Marriage is a great institution. I'm not ready for an institution."

In 1916, West began a relationship with James Timony (1884–1954), an attorney and her manager. By the mid-1930s, they were no longer a couple but remained close until his death.

She was also romantically linked to Owney Madden, owner of the Cotton Club.

West remained close to her family throughout her life and was especially affected by her mother's death in 1930. She moved into apartment 611, one floor from the top, at The Ravenswood in Hollywood that year, remaining there until her death. She later brought her father, sister, and brother to Hollywood and supported them.

In her sixties, West became romantically involved with Chester Rybinski (1923–1999), a former Mr. California and member of her Las Vegas stage show. He later changed his name to Paul Novak. He was 30 years her junior and remained with her until her death. Novak once commented, "I believe I was put on this Earth to take care of Mae West."

West would sometimes refer to herself in the third person and speak of "Mae West" as the entertainment character she had created.

West was a Presbyterian.

== Death ==
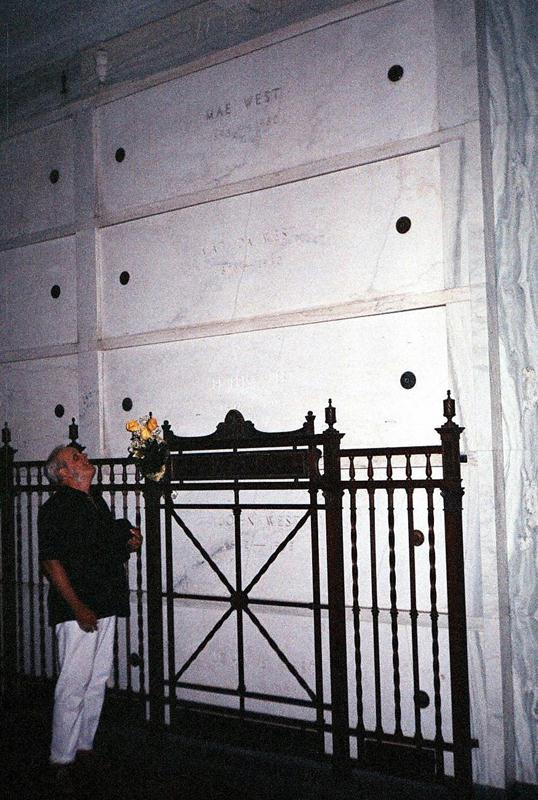
West family crypt at Cypress Hills Cemetery, with Mae at top

In August 1980, West tripped while getting out of bed. After the fall, she was unable to speak and was taken to Good Samaritan Hospital in Los Angeles, where tests revealed that she had suffered a stroke. She died three months later on November 22 at the age of 87.

A private service was held three days later at the church in Forest Lawn Memorial Park. Her friend, Bishop Andre Penachio, officiated at the entombment in the family mausoleum at Cypress Hills Cemetery in Brooklyn, which had been purchased in 1930 when her mother died. Her father and brother had also been entombed there, and her younger sister Beverly was laid to rest in the last of the five crypts less than 18 months later.

== In popular culture ==
- In the 1935 Laurel and Hardy film Bonnie Scotland, in response to the character Mrs. Burns saying to Mr. Miggs, "The next time you drop down to Glasgow, you must come up and see me some time", Stan comments, "It's Mae West."
- In the 1937 film Stand-In, the stage mother (Anne O'Neal) who has her young daughter (Marianne Edwards) auditioning for Dodd (Leslie Howard) tells her, "Now, do the Mae West number."
- During World War II, Allied aircrews called their yellow inflatable, vest-like personal flotation devices "Mae Wests", partly from rhyming slang for "breasts" and partly because of the resemblance to her torso. A "Mae West" is also a type of round parachute malfunction that contorts the shape of the canopy into the appearance of a large brassiere.
- West is referenced in songs, including the title number of Cole Porter's Broadway musical Anything Goes and in "You're the Top".
- Surrealist artist Salvador Dalí created works inspired by West, including Face of Mae West Which May Be Used as an Apartment and the Mae West Lips Sofa, completed in 1938 for Edward James.
- Several of West's comedy lines are used in the parody musical Wild Side Story (1973–2004).
- In 1982, actress Ann Jillian portrayed West in the television biopic Mae West.
- In 2000, Dirty Blonde, a play about two Mae West fans, opened on Broadway at the Helen Hayes Theater.
- MAE-West ("Metropolitan Area Exchange, West") was a major Internet exchange point in the United States, with a corresponding MAE-East on the East Coast.
- In 2017, West was the subject of an episode of the TV series Over My Dead Body on Amazon Prime.
- West was the subject of the 2020 PBS documentary Mae West: Dirty Blonde, part of the American Masters series and produced by Bette Midler.
- The Canadian dessert cake May West (formerly spelled "Mae West") was named in her honor. It remains popular in Quebec and parts of Ontario.
- A 52-meter-high (171 ft) sculpture in Munich, completed in 2011, is titled Mae West.

== Broadway stage ==
Broadway stage
| Date | Production | Role | Notes | Ref. |
|---|---|---|---|---|
| September 22, 1911 – September 30, 1911 | A La Broadway | Maggie O'Hara | | |
| November 20, 1911 – February 24, 1912 | Vera Violetta | | West left the show during previews. | |
| April 11, 1912 – September 7, 1912 | A Winsome Widow | Le Petite Daffy | West left show after opening night. | |
| October 4, 1918 – June 1919 | Sometime | Mayme Dean | | |
| August 17, 1921 – September 10, 1921 | The Mimic World of 1921 | | | |
| April 26, 1926 – March 1927 | Sex | Margie LaMont | Written by Jane Mast (West), West was jailed for 8 days because of the play's content. | |
| January 1927 | The Drag | | Closed during out-of-town tryouts (Bridgeport, Connecticut) credited only as writer | |
| November 1927 | The Wicked Age | Evelyn ("Babe") Carson | | |
| April 9, 1928 – September 1928 | Diamond Lil | Diamond Lil | | |
| October 1, 1928 – October 2, 1928 | Pleasure Man | | Credited only as writer | |
| September 14, 1931 – November 1931 | The Constant Sinner | Babe Gordon | | |
| August 2, 1944 – January 13, 1945 | Catherine Was Great | Catherine II | | |
| 1945–46 | Come on Up | | Tour | |
| September 1947 – May 1948 | Diamond Lil | Diamond Lil | (Revival) United Kingdom | |
| February 5, 1949 – February 26, 1949 | Diamond Lil | Diamond Lil | (Second revival) until West broke her ankle on the latter date The play resumed as a "return engagement". | |
| September 7, 1949 – January 21, 1950 | Diamond Lil | Diamond Lil | (Second revival) as "return engagement" | |
| September 14, 1951 – November 10, 1951 | Diamond Lil | Diamond Lil | (Third Revival) | |
| July 7, 1961 – closing date unknown | Sextette | | Edgewater Beach Playhouse | |

Other plays as writer
| Year | Title | Notes | Ref. |
|---|---|---|---|
| 1921 | The Ruby Ring | Vaudeville playlet | |
| 1922 | The Hussy | Unproduced | |
| 1930 | Frisco Kate | Unproduced, later produced as the 1936 film Klondike Annie | |
| 1933 | Loose Women | Performed in 1935 under title Ladies By Request | |
| 1936 | Clean Beds | Sold treatment to George S. George (pseudonym of playwright Henry Rosendahl), who produced an unsuccessful Broadway play of West's treatment | |

== Filmography ==
| Year | Film | Role | Writer(s) | Co-stars | Director | Studio |
|---|---|---|---|---|---|---|
| 1932 | Night After Night | Maudie Triplett | Story: Louis Bromfield; Screenplay: Vincent Lawrence; Continuity: Kathryn Scola; Additional dialogue (uncredited): Mae West | George Raft; Constance Cummings; Wynne Gibson | Archie Mayo | Paramount Pictures |
| 1933 | She Done Him Wrong | Lady Lou | Screenplay: Harvey F. Thew and John Bright; Based on the play Diamond Lil by Mae West | Cary Grant; Owen Moore; Gilbert Roland | Lowell Sherman | Paramount Pictures |
| 1933 | I'm No Angel | Tira | Story, Screenplay and All Dialogue: Mae West; Suggestions: Lowell Brentano; Continuity: Harlan Thompson | Cary Grant; Gregory Ratoff; Edward Arnold | Wesley Ruggles | Paramount Pictures |
| 1934 | Belle of the Nineties | Ruby Carter | Mae West | Roger Pryor; Johnny Mack Brown; Katherine DeMille | Leo McCarey | Paramount Pictures |
| 1935 | Goin' to Town | Cleo Borden | Screenplay: Mae West; Story: Marion Morgan and George B. Dowell | Paul Cavanagh; Gilbert Emery; Marjorie Gateson | Alexander Hall | Paramount Pictures |
| 1936 | Klondike Annie | Rose Carlton a.k.a. The Frisco Doll a.k.a. Sister Annie Alden | Screenplay: Mae West; Story: Marion Morgan and George B. Dowell; And material suggested by Frank Mitchell Dazey | Victor McLaglen; Phillip Reed; Helen Jerome Eddy | Raoul Walsh | Paramount Pictures |
| 1936 | Go West, Young Man | Mavis Arden | Screenplay: Mae West; Based on the play Personal Appearance by Lawrence Riley | Warren William; Randolph Scott; Alice Brady | Henry Hathaway | Paramount Pictures |
| 1937 | Every Day's a Holiday | Peaches O'Day | Mae West | Edmund Lowe; Charles Butterworth; Charles Winninger | A. Edward Sutherland | Paramount Pictures |
| 1940 | My Little Chickadee | Flower Belle Lee | Mae West and W. C. Fields | W. C. Fields; Joseph Calleia; Dick Foran | Edward F. Cline | Universal Pictures |
| 1943 | The Heat's On | Fay Lawrence | Fitzroy Davis & George S. George and Fred Schiller | Victor Moore; William Gaxton; Lester Allen | Gregory Ratoff | Columbia Pictures |
| 1970 | Myra Breckinridge | Leticia Van Allen | Screenplay: Michael Sarne and David Giler; Based on the novel by Gore Vidal | Raquel Welch; John Huston; Farrah Fawcett | Michael Sarne | 20th Century Fox |
| 1978 | Sextette | Marlo Manners; Lady Barrington | Screenplay: Herbert Baker; Based on the play by Mae West | Timothy Dalton; Dom DeLuise; Tony Curtis | Ken Hughes | Crown International Pictures |

== Discography ==
Albums:

- 1956: The Fabulous Mae West; Decca D/DL-79016 (several reissues up to 2006)
- 1960: W.C. Fields His Only Recording Plus 8 Songs by Mae West; Proscenium PR 22
- 1966: Way Out West; Tower T/ST-5028
- 1966: Wild Christmas; Dragonet LPDG-48
- 1970: The Original Voice Tracks from Her Greatest Movies; Decca D/DL-791/76
- 1970: Mae West & W.C. Fields Side by Side; Harmony HS 11374/HS 11405
- 1972: Great Balls of Fire; MGM SE 4869
- 1974: Original Radio Broadcasts; Mark 56 Records 643
- 1987/1995: Sixteen Sultry Songs Sung by Mae West Queen of Sex; Rosetta RR 1315
- 1996: I'm No Angel; Jasmine CD 04980 102
- 2006: The Fabulous: Rev-Ola CR Rev 181

At least 21 singles (78 rpm and 45 rpm) were released from 1933 to 1973.

== Written works ==
- West, Mae (1930). Babe Gordon. The Macaulay Company. (the novel on which The Constant Sinner was based)
- West, Mae (1932). Diamond Lil Man. Caxton House. (novelization of play)
- West, Mae; Weintraub, Joseph (1967). The Wit and Wisdom of Mae West. G.P. Putnam. ISBN 978-0-399-50549-2.
- West, Mae (1970) [1959]. Goodness Had Nothing to Do with It. Prentice-Hall. ISBN 978-1-86049-034-7.
- West, Mae (1975a). Mae West on Sex, Health and ESP. W.H. Allen. ISBN 978-0-491-01613-1.
- West, Mae (1975b). Pleasure Man. Dell Pub. Co. ISBN 978-0-440-07074-0.
- West, Mae (1997). Schlissel, Lillian (ed.). Three Plays by Mae West: Sex, The Drag, Pleasure Man. Routledge. ISBN 978-0-415-90933-4.
- West, Mae (2023). Tutak, Romain (ed.). Mae West – The First Plays: Ruby Ring, The Hussy, The Wicked Age, Frisco Kate. ISBN 979-8856398860.
