= The Captive (play) =

1926 French play

- Original language: French
- Written by: Édouard Bourdet
- Genre: Melodrama, tragedy
- Setting: Irène De Montcel's room and the study in Jacques Virieu's apartment

Premiere
- Date: 6 March 1926
- Place: Théâtre Fémina, Paris

The Captive (French: La Prisonnière) is a 1926 French play by Édouard Bourdet. The three-act melodrama was among the first Broadway plays to deal with lesbians and caused a scandal in New York City. The play was shut down after 160 performances and prompted the adoption of a state law dealing with obscenity.

== Synopsis ==
Irène is a lesbian tortured by her love for Madame d'Aiguines, but pretending engagement to Jacques. Though Irène attempts to leave Mme. d'Aiguines and marry Jacques, she returns to the relationship, saying that it is "a prison to which I must return captive, despite myself". Mme. d'Aiguines is not seen in the play, but leaves behind nosegays of violets for Irène, as a symbol of her love.

== Broadway cast ==
- Ann Trevor – Gisele De Montcel
- Winifred Fraser – Mlle. Marchand
- Minna Phillips – Josephine
- Norman Trevor – De Montcel
- Helen Menken – Irène De Montcel
- Basil Rathbone – Jacques Virieu
- Arthur Lewis – Georges
- Ann Andrews – Françoise Meillant
- Arthur Wontner – D'Aiguines

== Production history ==
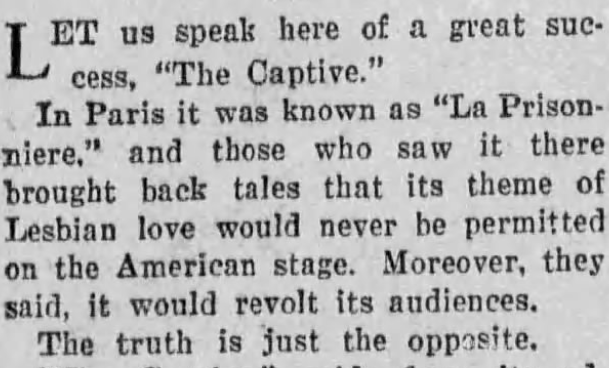
1926 review of The Captive in The Baltimore Sun.

La Prisonnière was written by Édouard Bourdet and premiered at Théâtre Fémina in Paris on 6 March 1926. The production included Mlle Sylvie and M. Pierre Blanchar. The production's metteur en scène was André Gailhard.

Max Reinhardt staged La Prisonnière in Vienna and Berlin, where it set records for attendance. It was then put on in the Netherlands, Switzerland, and Belgium.

=== Broadway ===
Producer and director Gilbert Miller, working with the Charles Frohman Company, announced his intentions to bring La Prisonnière to Broadway. Arthur Hornblow, Jr. adapted and translated the play to the English language, with the title The Captive.

The Captive debuted at the Empire Theatre in New York on 29 September 1926. The play, staged by Gilbert Miller, cast Helen Menken as Irène and Basil Rathbone as Jacques. Both Rathbone and Arthur Wontner (who portrayed D'Aiguines) later had roles as Sherlock Holmes in film. The play ran for 160 performances. It was among the first Broadway plays to have female homosexuality as its subject. The audience for the play was said to be predominantly female, with one account placing the figure at almost 80%.

Publishing magnate William Randolph Hearst, whose mistress's niece was lesbian, was personally biased against the play. Hearst newspapers the New York Daily Mirror and the New York American ran articles condemning the play. The Captive was put on trial for indecency by the Citizens' Play Jury and was cleared of charges. Led by John S. Sumner, the New York Society for the Suppression of Vice campaigned alongside the Catholic Church and other religious organizations to close The Captive and other plays on obscenity charges. Religious groups and women's clubs also expressed disapproval of the play. A former president of the Colonial Dames of America informed Miller that she would use her influence "to prevent such an affront to American womanhood."

Theater critic Brooks Atkinson wrote a review of The Captive for The New York Times on 30 September 1926, praising it as "a long, engrossing, haunting play . . . an expert dramatic production."

The character Irène is depicted as a lesbian who is feminine, attractive, and seductive. Sherrie Inness writes that "the play dismantles the idea of the lesbian as the easily recognizable Other (i.e., the mannish lesbian)," instead offering a lesbian prototype more threatening to the hegemony of heterosexuality. The age difference between Irène and Madame d'Aiguines was a type of relationship often portrayed in mid-20th century depictions of lesbians and reinforced Teresa de Lauretis's conjecture that the loss of the mother produces relationships of that type.

New York County District Attorney Joab H. Banton received pressure from the Society for the Prevention of Vice. When mayor Jimmy Walker went on vacation to Cuba in the winter of 1927, acting mayor Joseph "Holy Joe" McKee ordered Banton to "banish nudity and obscenity" from Broadway theatres. Plainclothes police were ordered to monitor The Captive and Mae West's play SEX on 5 February. Four days later, Banton issued an order to have the casts of both plays arrested.

On 9 February 1927, while Rathbone and Menken were in middle of the second act of The Captive, police marched onto the stage and arrested the pair. With the rest of the cast, they were thrown in the back of a police van with the cast of SEX, who had also been arrested and taken to jail. West and Menken fought with each other, with West accusing Menken of being a lesbian in a lavender marriage and Menken suggesting that West was a drag queen. Rathbone described the events on the night of the raid in his autobiography: "As we walked out onto the stage to await our first entrances we were stopped by a plainclothes policeman who showed his badge and said, 'Please don't let it disturb your performance tonight but consider yourself under arrest!' ... At the close of the play the cast were all ordered to dress and stand by to be escorted in police cars to a night court."

Attorneys for The Captive secured the release of the cast by agreeing with the office of the District Attorney to withdraw their play from the stage.

Production director Gilbert Miller asked the Famous Players–Lasky Motion Picture Company to support a legal challenge to the closure, but they wouldn't for fear of negative publicity. Following the suppression of the play, publisher Horace Liveright bought the production rights. He went to court seeking an injunction against the New York Police Department to prevent the play from being closed again. Though Liveright gave up after months of negotiations with the authorities, Acting Mayor McKee retaliated by re-opening a two-year-old indictment.

==== Wales Padlock Act ====
In New York, a censorship campaign against the plays The Captive, The Virgin Man, The Drag (another Mae West production marketed as "A Male Captive"), and SEX prompted the Wales Padlock Act, a state law that had the effect of banning depictions of homosexuality in theatres. Sponsored by New York State Senator B. Roger Wales, the bill allowed for the arrest and prosecution of any actors or producers involved in an "immoral drama." If the producers of a play were convicted, the theatre could be padlocked for a year. The legislature amended the public obscenity code to ban plays "depicting or dealing with the subject of sex degeneracy, or sex perversion."

==== Effect on the demand for violets ====
In the 1920s, "violet" was a common slang word for homosexuality, often associated with lesbians. Lesbian audience members for La Prisonnière in Paris pinned violets to their lapels and belts to show solidarity with the characters and subject. Newspaper coverage of The Captive further publicized the notion of the violet as a homosexual symbol, an association that lasted several decades. The association did not bode well for violet sales. Flower shops in New York City saw a decreased demand for violets. A November 1934 article in Harper's Bazaar, "The Story of Violets", related that "way back in the violet county last year they were still cursing this play as the knell of the violet industry."

== Notes ==
1.Sholem Asch's 1907 play God of Vengeance was performed on Broadway in 1923.
