= Daly's Theatre (disambiguation) =

Augustin Daly founded or managed several theatres:

- Daly's Theatre in London

New York City
- Daly's 63rd Street Theatre
- Fifth Avenue Theatre
- Madison Square Theatre
- Daly's Theatre (30th Street), from 1879 to 1920 (demolished); previously operated by the Shubert Brothers Theater Company
