= Roger Stéphane =

French writer (1919–1994)

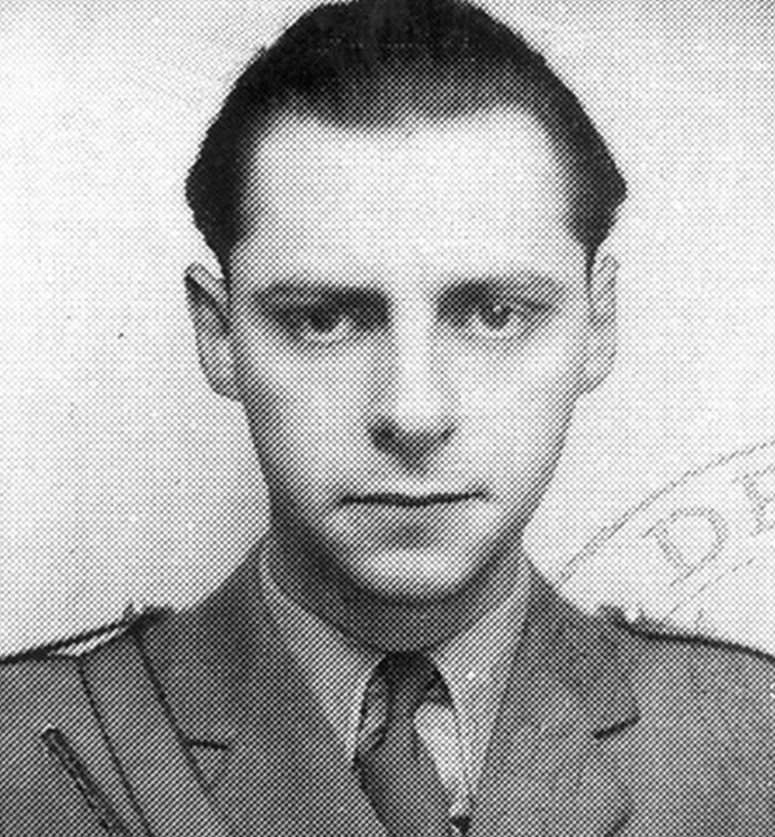
Roger Stéphane

Roger Stéphane (19 August 1919 - 4 December 1994) was the name used by the French writer, Roger Worms. He originally selected it in September 1941 when he joined the "Combat" Resistance group. After the Liberation he became a literary critic, author and journalist, acknowledged during his final years as a member of the Paris left wing intellectual establishment. Openly gay, he is also remembered as a pioneering campaigner for gay rights.

Known for his aestheticism, those whom he particularly admired included Stendhal, Proust and T. E. Lawrence. As an author, there are suggestions that his choice of subject matter was catholic sometimes verging on the eclectic. He wrote biographical works about both Habib Bourguiba and his old friend Georges Simenon.

He died in December 1994 as a result of suicide.

== Life ==
Roger Worms was born into a middle class Jewish family in Paris. His father was in business. He was taught by a private tutor, the scholar and writer René Étiemble, with whom he entered into a regular correspondence from the age of 15. Worms displayed little interest in the traditional subjects of a secondary education, which he managed to complete without passing his Baccalauréat, the traditional school leaving exam necessary for progressing to university level education. As a teenager, partly as a reaction to the tide of populist nationalism sweeping over western Europe, he became a fervent communist, frequenting left wing literary circles in Paris. Because of this, at a very young age he was noticed (and influenced) by some of the great writers of the day, such as André Gide, Roger Martin du Gard and André Malraux who encouraged him to become oriented towards "réflexion engagée" (literally "engaged reflection"). Even at a relatively young age he made no effort to conceal his homosexuality.

Although war broke out in September 1939, for most people it was only after the German invasion of May/June 1940 that war's reality arrived in Paris. Worms involved himself in the resistance movement, and in September 1941 was one of those who created the "Combat" resistance network, and the eponymous resistance newspaper. He operated in the Aude department, according to one source, as an "ROP" ("Resistance, Organisation, Propaganda") agent. In May 1942 Roger Stéphane, as he was known to resistance comrades and, subsequently, to posterity, was arrested and held in Fort Barraux which had been converted into an internment camp, but he managed to escape on 16 November while undergoing a hospital visit to La Tronche. His arrest had been mandated by René Bousquet, secretary of state at the Interior Ministry of the puppet regime which at this time was governing the southern part of France with the increasingly inflexible backing of German state agencies such as the Gestapo. The ministry decree mandating his arrest cited his "gaullist activities". He was later rearrested and held at Évian-les-Bains, let out only in June 1944 as the war, in this part of Europe, drew to its conclusion. He lost little time in making his way to Paris where, during the final part of August 1944, together with Gérard Philipe, he took part in the liberation of the City Hall ("Hôtel de Ville"). During the final months of fighting he fought under André Malraux in the Alsace-Lorraine Independent Brigade.

During the war André Malraux had been a supporter of Charles de Gaulle and after the war, with de Gaulle in charge of the Provisional Government, and Malreaux enjoying heroic status during the highly charged months of postwar euphoria, his friend Roger Stéphane was employed by the Interior Ministry. It was Stéphane who arranged the arrest of Pierre Taittinger and the dismissal of the prefects (regional administrators) appointed by the "Vichy" puppet regime.

During the 1940s he worked as a chronicler of contemporary politics and literary critic, contributing to "Temps modernes" ("Modern Times"), Paris-Soir and Combat. In 1950 he joined with Claude Bourdet and Gilles Martinet to found "L'Observateur". After a few years, known as "the adventurer in a bow tie", because of his dandyish appearance, he became a central figure in the French press, combining that role with a central presence in the intellectually dynamic Saint-Germain-des-Prés milieu. Familiars included Roger Vailland, Jean-Paul Sartre, Simone de Beauvoir, Jean Genet, Louis Aragon, François Mauriac, Georges Simenon and Marcel Jouhandeau. As an eloquent exponent of decolonisation, during the Indochina War he had his own taste of the inside of the vast Fresnes Prison for three weeks, in connection with "Exchanges of intelligence with the enemy".

During the 1960s, working as a television producer with Roland Darbois, he was responsible for the series "Pour le Plaisir" and for a memorable documentary film entitled Proust, l'art et la douleur ("Proust, the artistry and the sorrow"). He also dedicated an unrepeatable "Memory portrait" of Proust, based on interviews with former friends of the novelist who had died four decades earlier. Those involved included Céleste Albaret, Emmanuel Berl, Jean Cocteau, Armand de Gramont, Daniel Halévy, François Mauriac, Paul Morand, Jacques de Lacretelle, Philippe Soupault, Hélène Soutzo and Simone de Caillavet. The audio-visual documentary, shot in black-and-white, was prepared only shortly before the deaths through age of several of the contributors. Viewers could watch and listen to some of the people closest to Proust (who had died in 1922), several of whom imitated his voice as they quoted him. observations.

During the postwar years Roger Stéphane consciously withdrew from the limelight, indulging in what his biographer, Régine Deforges, termed as "la passion d'admirer", talking and writing relatively little about himself. Two exceptions deserve a mention. Appearing in 1953 Parce que c'était lui (Because it was he) was an autobiographical account in which he reasserted his homosexuality. Much later, towards the end of his life, Tout est bien (All is well), is a chronicle of personal disillusion which won him renewed attention from the general public.

He died in 1994 and was buried at Ivry Cemetery, Ivry-sur-Seine.

== Published output (selection) ==
- Chaque homme est lié au monde, Sagittaire, 1946
- La Tunisie de Bourguiba, Plon, 1958
- L'Ascenseur, roman, Laffont, 1960
- T. E. Lawrence, Gallimard/Bibliothèque idéale, 1960
- Georges Simenon, RTF, 1963 (with Roland Darbois)
- Jean Cocteau, RTF, 1964
- Toutes choses ont leur raison, Fayard, 1979
- Autour de Montaigne, Stock, 1986
- Tout est bien, chronique, Quai Voltaire, 1989
- Portrait-souvenir de Georges Simenon, Quai Voltaire, 1989
- Rue Laszlo Rajk, une tragédie hongroise, Odile Jacob, 1991
- La Gloire de Stendhal, textes réunis et préfacés par Roger Stéphane, Quai Voltaire, 1994
- Des hommes libres, 1940-1945 : La France libre par ceux qui l'ont faite, Grasset, 1998 (avec Daniel Rondeau)
- Portrait de l'aventurier
- Fin d'une jeunesse, Carnets 1944-1947, Table ronde, 2004
- Parce que c'était lui, récit (1952), H&O 2005, preface by Olivier Delorme
