= Édouard Bourdet =

French playwright

Édouard Bourdet (Saint-Germain-en-Laye, 26 October 1887 – Paris, 17 January 1945) was a 20th-century French playwright.

He was married to the poet, Catherine Pozzi; their son was Claude Bourdet.

== Plays ==
- 1910: Le Rubicon
- 1912: La Cage ouverte, Théâtre Michel
- 1922: L'Heure du berger
- 1923: L'Homme enchaîné, play in 3 acts, Théâtre Fémina, 7 Novembre
- 1926: La Prisonnière, presented in London, New York and Vienna
- 1927: Vient de paraître, comedy in 4 acts, Théâtre de la Michodière, 25 November
- 1929: Le Sexe faible, comedy in 3 acts which ran for nearly two years at the Théâtre de la Michodière, 10 December, and was also presented in Berlin
- 1932: La Fleur des pois, comedy in 4 acts, Théâtre de la Michodière, 4 October
- 1934: Les Temps difficiles, play in 4 acts, Théâtre de la Michodière, 30 January, revived at the Théâtre du Vieux-Colombier (Comédie-Française) from 22 November to 30 December 2006, arranged by Jean-Claude Berruti
- 1935: Margot, play in 2 acts, Théâtre Marigny, 26 November, with Pierre Fresnay, Jacques Dumesnil and Yvonne Printemps. Mise en scène was Pierre Fresnay's and the incidental music by Georges Auric and Francis Poulenc
- 1936: Fric-Frac, play in 5 acts, Théâtre de la Michodière, 15 October
- 1941: Hyménée, play in 4 acts, Théâtre de la Michodière, 7 May
- 1942: Père, Théâtre de la Michodière, 15 December

== Theatre director ==
- 1938: Le Vieil Homme by Georges de Porto-Riche, Comédie-Française

== Filmography ==
- 1933: The Weaker Sex by Robert Siodmak, screenplay and dialogue after his play.

== Honors and awards ==
- Commander of the Order of Legion of Honour
- Croix de guerre 1914-1918

== Bibliography ==
- Denise Bourdet, Édouard Bourdet et ses amis, Jeune Parque, 1963
- Roger Bordier, Édouard Bourdet ou le théâtre du défi, Les Éditions de l'Amandier, 2006
- Bruno Tessarech, Villa blanche - A la recherche du temps perdu, Buchet Chastel, 2005

=== Archival sources ===
- Ellen Van Volkenburg-Maurice Browne general correspondence, 1911- (ca. 5 linear feet) are housed in the University of Michigan Special Collections Library. Contains correspondence with Édouard Bourdet.
- Alexander Berkman Papers, 1892-1936 (4.05 meters) are held in the International Institute of Social History. Contains correspondence with Édouard Bourdet.
