= Catherine Pozzi =

French poet

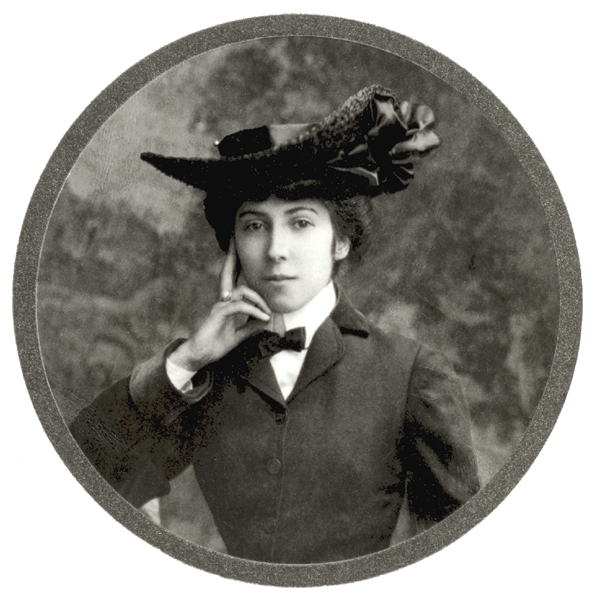
- Pozzi at 18
- Born: Catherine Marthe Louise Pozzi; 13 July 1882; Paris, France
- Died: 3 December 1934 (aged 52); Paris, France
- Occupation: Poet
- Spouse: Édouard Bourdet (m. 1907)
- Partner: Paul Valéry
- Children: Claude Bourdet
- Relatives: Samuel Pozzi (father)
- Writing career
- Language: French

Catherine Marthe Louise Pozzi (13 July 1882 – 3 December 1934) was a French poet and woman of letters.

== Early life ==
Catherine Pozzi was born in an aristocratic and bourgeois environment at the end of the 19th century, to Thérèse Loth-Cazalis and Samuel Pozzi, surgeon and gynecologist. Her well-educated family was friends with artists and writers, including José-Maria de Heredia and Paul Bourget. From a young age she was interested in music, and at age 11 started keeping a journal. She studied for a year in Oxford.

At the age of 19, she read the published diary of Marie Bashkirtseff, and it had a profound effect upon her, spurring her to write intensely in her own journal.

She began studying history, philosophy, religion, math, and sciences as the student of Marie Jaëll. In 1918, at the age of 37, she passed her baccalaureate. In that year, her father was murdered by one of his former patients who was suffering from a paranoid delusion.

== Career ==
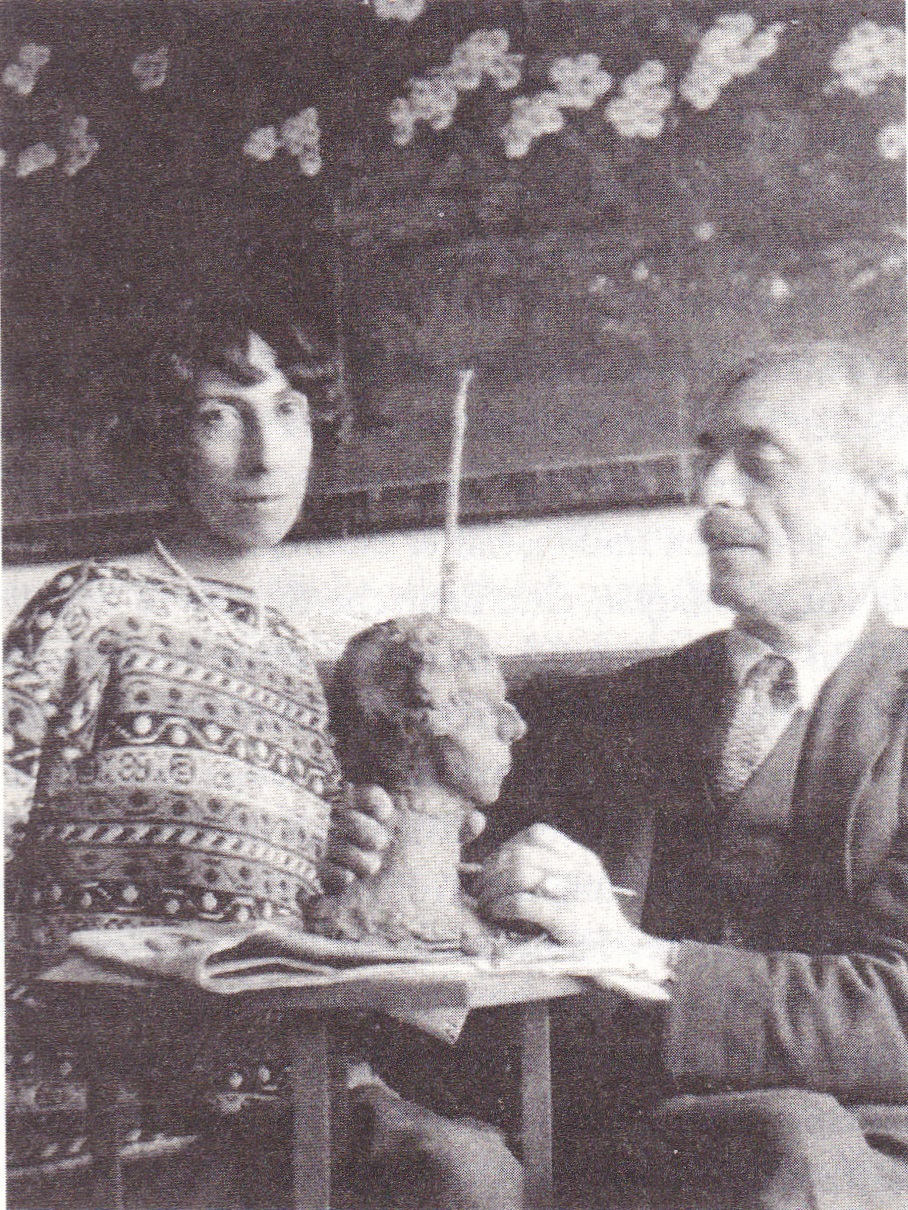
Pozzi & Paul Valéry (c.1924)

Catherine Pozzi was particularly known for six brilliant poems, published in 1935 (Mesures), and which she considered her literary testament: "Ave", "Vale", "Scopolamine", "Nova", "Maya" and "Nyx". This last (Nyx means "night" in Greek) was composed on 5 November 1934, shortly before her death. She also left an anonymous autobiography: Agnès (NRF, 1927), and an unfinished philosophical essay: Peau d’Ame. Some scientific articles of hers appeared in Le Figaro.

More recently, the publication of her Journal (1913–1934) and Journal de jeunesse (1893–1906) renewed interest in her. Her published correspondence with Paul Valéry represents only a small portion of their exchanged letters.

Some of Pozzi's poems evoke those of Louise Labé, but their effect and tension seem to have little in common with the work of the 16th century.

Friends of hers included Rainer Maria Rilke, Anna de Noailles, Jean Paulhan (editor of La Nouvelle Revue française), Colette, Henri de Régnier, Pierre Jean Jouve.

== Personal life ==
At age 25, she married the popular dramatist Édouard Bourdet. In 1909 their son Claude (later a member of the French Resistance) was born, who married the Russian tennis player Ida Adamoff.

Around 1910, she began to exhibit symptoms of tuberculosis, from which she suffered until her death.

She began in 1920 a tumultuous relationship with Paul Valéry, which lasted eight years and gave rise to important correspondence. The rift between them distanced her from the Paris salons and caused her to have a terrible feeling of isolation.

She died in Paris on 3 December 1934, after illness with tuberculosis, aggravated by morphine and laudanum use.

== Bibliography ==
=== Works ===
- Très haut amour (Poèmes et autres textes), Gallimard Poésie. ISBN 2-07-042105-8
- Poèmes, Gallimard / Métamorphoses. ISBN 2-07-025224-8
- Catherine Pozzi, Œuvre poétique, éd. Lawrence Joseph, Paris, La Différence, « Littérature », 1988.
- Agnès, Paris, La Différence, 1988, coll. "Minos", 2002. ISBN 2-7291-1413-0
- Peau d'âme, prés. Lawrence Joseph, Paris, La Différence, « Philosophia perennis », 1990.
- Catherine Pozzi, Rainer Maria Rilke, Correspondance 1924-1925, prés. Lawrence Joseph, Paris, La Différence, « Littérature », 1990.
- Catherine Pozzi, Jean Paulhan, Correspondance 1926-1934, éd. Françoise Simonet-Tenant, Paris, C. Paulhan, « Pour mémoire », 1999.
- Catherine Pozzi et Jean Paulhan, Correspondance 1926-1934, Ed. Claire Paulhan 1999.
- La flamme et la cendre : Correspondance (Paul Valéry, Catherine Pozzi, Lawrence Joseph). Gallimard / Blanche 2006, 830 p. ISBN 2-07-077254-3
- Catherine Pozzi, Journal de jeunesse : 1893-1906, éd. Claire Paulhan, ISBN 2-912222-02-8
- Catherine Pozzi, Journal : 1913-1934, éd. et annot. Claire Paulhan, préf. Lawrence Joseph.

Paris, Ramsay, 1987 / Seghers, 1990 / C. Paulhan, « Pour mémoire », 1999. Réédité chez Éditions Phébus (édition augmentée, 798 p) : ISBN 2-7529-0044-9

=== Biographies ===
- Lawrence Joseph : Catherine Pozzi, Une robe couleur du temps, Ed. de la Différence, 1988. ISBN 2-7291-0318-X
- Pierre Boutang, Karin Pozzi et la quête de l'immortalité, Paris, La Différence, « Mobile matière », 1991. ISBN 2-7291-0654-5
- Mireille Diaz-Florian: Catherine Pozzi. La vocation à la nuit. Préface de Claire Paulhan. Collection: "Le cercle des poètes disparus"Éditions Aden.2008
