= Pleasure Man =

Play by Mae West

Pleasure Man is a 1928 drama/murder mystery play by Mae West.

== Production history ==
Pleasure Man began as a rework of West’s short-lived play The Drag. West made the protagonist of Pleasure Man heterosexual rather than homosexual, and refined the comedy and plot progression. However, the show still retained the Drag Ball spectacle that concluded the show. Initial rehearsals of the play began with West simply writing notes on scraps of paper and letting the actors improvise and find the scenes themselves.

This piece opened outside of Manhattan at the Bronx Opera House September 16 and then showed in Queens, New York at the Boulevard Theatre (Queens). The play's Broadway debut was October 1, 1928 at the Biltmore Theatre.

After the show, police arrested the entire cast of 56 after a performance at the Biltmore Theatre and they were charged with indecency. The events stirred the media and the Evening Post ran the headline "Mae West raid open crusade to purify stage; mayor Walker alleged sponsor of drive to purify Broadway". An injunction allowed for a matinee performance the next day, but even with some bits of the show cut out, it was raided again, this time during the performance, and the cast rearrested, not before a drag queen delivered an oration about police oppression.

The show was described as depicting backstage burlesque and one reviewer called it the "queerest show you've ever seen" and as having "all the Queens" in it. Another review noted the presence of "Harlem bacchanales". A couple of favorable reviews found it entertaining, but most reviewers gave it rather scornful criticism including description of it as "filth" and "foul exhibitionism".

Pleasure Man was put on trial two years after the premiere, charging the company for "sex, degeneracy, and sex perversion". The trial was riddled with homophobia, chastising the “degenerates” that they saw on the stage, and asking if their manners of female impersonation carried on off stage. The jury failed to reach a decision and the charges were dismissed.

West later wrote an expanded, novelized version of the play, published in 1975.

== List of characters ==
Theatre crew

- Bridget, Maggie, Lizzie, Tillie – Scrubwomen
- Steve McAllister – Manager
- Bradley – Assistant Manager
- Bill – Master Electrician
- Stanley Smith – Production Manager
- Ted Arnold – Scientist and engineer
- Mary Ann – Ted Arnold's Sister
- Leader – Orchestra Leader
- Call Boy

Performers

- Dolores – Dancer
- Randall – Dolores's Husband/Partner
- Flo, Bobby, Jewel, Jane – Dancers
- Chuck and Joe – Dancers
- Hermann and Fritz Otto – German Acrobats
- Paradise Dupont – Female Impersonator
- Four Boys
- Peaches and Bunny – Female Impersonators
- The Cobra
- Edgar – Small Town Vaudevillian
- Edgar's Wife
- Lester Queen
- Maybelle – Dancer
- Four Hoofers
- Ripley and Mrs. Hetherington – Dramatic Actors
- Rodney Terrill – Voluptuary
- Nikko – Japanese Valet
- Toto – Wealthy Retired Performer
- Police Chief
- Assistant Police Chief

== Synopsis ==
Act One

Act One opens in a theatre in a small Midwest town. The scrubwomen are finishing up cleaning the theatre, looting scraps left from previous performances and gossiping. The crew comes in and begins to set up for a Vaudeville performance. Steve eagerly waits for the performers to arrive. Paradise arrives first with Edgar and their boys. Paradise describes their act and Edgar goes over music cues with The Leader. Terrill then arrives with his Japanese Valet and he begins to flirt with Bobby. Flo comes in as Bobby leaves and Terrill flirts with her as well and speaks of letters that he supposedly sent her in the past. Steve comes back in and warns Terrill to knock off his old ways or he will be thrown out. Steve then warns the dancers of Terrill and begins to assign dressing rooms. Randall and Dolores arrive and as Randall works out some issues with Steve, Terrill confesses his love to Dolores. Dolores worries that Randall will find out about them. Randall and Dolores find out that their electrician doesn't have a union card, which evolves into them arguing about the suspicion Randall has over Dolores and Terrill. The Otto brothers arrive and are missing one of their partners. Stanley agrees to help with their act as he used to be an acrobat himself. The act ends with Arnold fiddling with lights and Randall starting to rehearse with Dolores and the dancers.

Act Two

Scene one opens with Terrill practicing one of his songs while touching up his makeup. Boys dressed as girls return to their dressing rooms, Bunny and Peaches are gossiping, and Chuck and Joe are teasing each other. Stanley comes in and Chuck tells him of his suspicions of Joe, but Stanley notices nothing. Dolores and Randall enter the dressing rooms still arguing about Terrill, while Terrill eaves drops. Arnold calls for Randall and as Randall leaves, Terrill slips a love note into the dressing room for Dolores. Dolores finishes reading the note for a third time when Terrill taps on Dolores's door. They show each other affection through the door until Otto and Stanley interrupt Terrill infuriated with him. The girls then start gossiping about guys and they begin to talk about the struggles between Dolores and Randall. Stanley and Terrill have a conversation about how Terrill gets all these girls to like him. Dolores then writes a note but hides it as Randall enters. Randall speaks of not wanting to lose Dolores. Lester arrives inviting everyone to Toto's big after-party as Arnold leaves to get gelatins. Arnold comes back and runs into Stanley and Terrill talking about girls Terrill has wooed. Arnold notices a picture of a girl that Terrill has been with and asks about her, but Terrill hardly remembers her. Arnold speaks to Steve about technical things and a call boy arrives saying there is a girl who wants to see Terrill. Mary Ann then comes in and tells Terrill that he must marry her. Terrill shoves her and she hits the stairway, screams, and faints. Paradise runs in and tries to help Mary Ann. Arnold then runs in and states who she is and helps as well. The rest of the girls crowd around and the scene closes with Paradise warning Dolores that she could be next. Scene two opens with Stanley interrogating Paradise. She tells him what she saw and Stanley then moves on to interrogate the hoofers. Terrill arrives from the stage and Paradise confronts him. Terrill threatens her but she doesn't back down so he leaves for his dressing room. Stanley tells Terrill he found a letter addressed to him, but doesn't know who it's from. Terrill lies saying it's probably from Flo. He then reads the letter. Meanwhile, the girls are calming Paradise down as she is extremely angry. She has a suspicion that Terrill was involved in Mary Ann's rough past, but she isn't going to ask questions because she fears her safety will be in danger. Terrill then meets with Dolores and they embrace. Randall comes and catches them together. He threatens Terrill's life and the curtain falls.

Act Three

The first scene of the third act opens in Toto's apartment for the party. Some boys are making small talk and Stanley, Bill and Chuck talk about the party. Toto shows up and mentions how happy he is that everyone came to his party. Terrill and Dolores arrive together and Stanley greets them. He asks where Randall is, but Terrill quickly changes the subject. The doorbell then rings and Randall barges in drunk asking where Dolores is. Toto and Stanley insist that she isn't at the party and they get him to leave quietly ending scene one. Scene two opens with the chief of police interrogating Steve about the murder of Terrill. Steve mentions the confrontation between Randall and Terrill at the theatre when Randall caught Terrill with Dolores. The chief then asks Toto why he threw the party and if Terrill was around. Toto mentions that Terrill was with Dolores the whole time. The chief then interrogates Dolores about Terrill and where her husband was. She mentions that she couldn't help but fall for Terrill and she did not see her husband at the party. Paradise brings up the fact that he showed up drunk. Randall does not remember anything after he left the party and Stanley argues that Terrill deserved to be killed. The chief arrests Randall. Paradise states that Terrill deserved his death after he struck down Mary Ann, which is revealed to be Ted Arnold's sister. The chief asks who Arnold is. Stanley tells him and just as the chief states the report of Randall's arrest, an officer arrives with Arnold in handcuffs stating that they found the killer. Arnold then states that he saw his sister's picture in Terrill's dressing room and knew that Terrill had been using her and found out that Terrill was the one who struck her earlier. He says that he did not want to kill him, just torture him. He had attempted to perform a surgery on Terrill that they would do on rats and other creatures in college "so that they could never propagate their own kind", but this resulted in his death. The play ends with Arnold telling the cops to take him away, his is ready to go.

== See also ==
- Sex (play)
- The Drag (play)
