= Claude Bourdet =

French politician and writer

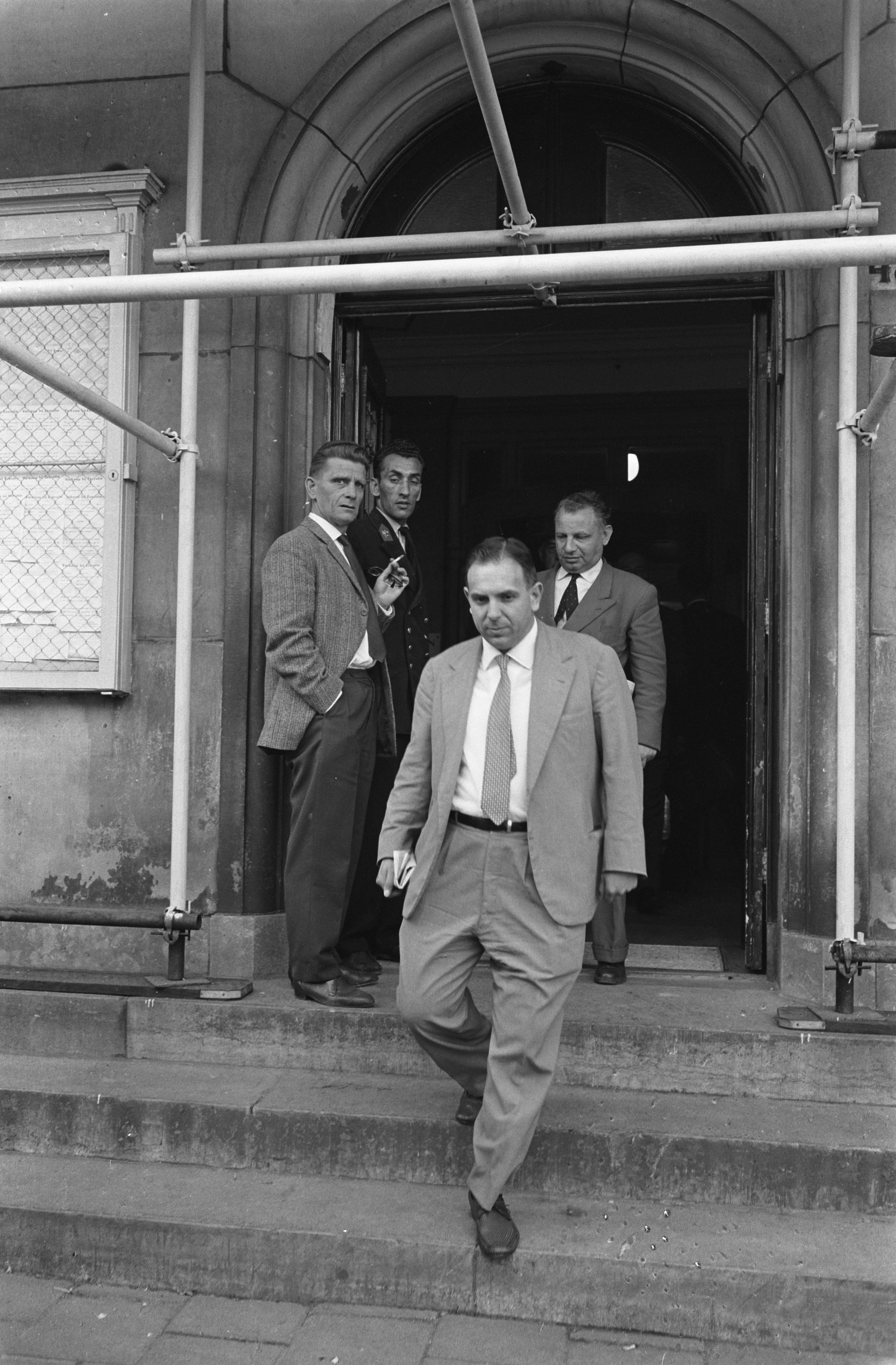
- Born: 28 August 1909; Paris, France
- Died: 20 March 1996 (aged 86); Paris, France
- Education: Swiss Federal Institute of Technology Zurich
- Occupations: Writer, journalist, polemist and militant French politician
- Relatives: Édouard Bourdet; Catherine Pozzi

Claude Bourdet (28 October 1909 – 20 March 1996) was a writer, journalist, polemist, and militant French politician.

== Personal life ==
Bourdet was a son of the dramatic author Édouard Bourdet and the poet Catherine Pozzi, was born and died in Paris, France.

In 1935, he married Ida Adamoff.

== Education ==
He left the Swiss Federal Institute of Technology Zurich with an engineering diploma in technical physics in 1933. After his military service in the Artillerie de Montagne, he was put in charge of a mission for the Economy Ministry, during the government of the Front populaire.

== Life ==
He was active in French Resistance movements and participated in the foundation of the resistance newspaper Combat along with Henri Frenay. Bourdet was a member of the management committee, until the departure of Frenay to London and later Algeria in 1943, when he was made its representative. From 1942, Bourdet took part in the creation and development of the newspaper with the task of dividing the public administrations.

In 1944, he was arrested by the Gestapo and, after being imprisoned at Fresnes, he was deported to various concentration camps, including Neuengamme, Sachsenhausen, and Buchenwald.

After the war, he continued to write at Combat, but his conflict with Henri Smadja, the owner of the newspaper, returned and he left the publication in 1950.

In 1950, with the help of Gilles Martinet and Roger Stéphane, Bourdet formed L’Observateur, which became L’Observateur Aujourd’hui in 1953, and then the France-Observateur in 1954. Claude Bourdet defended the union of the left and social justice. He supported the anti-colonial fight, denouncing repression in Madagascar and torture in Algeria.

In 1961, he investigated and denounced Maurice Papon, the prefect of the police force, in connection with the shootings of Algerian FLN demonstrators on 17 October of that year, in the Paris massacre of 1961.

Bourdet's political militancy created tensions which led to a major rupture of the France-Observateur team in 1963, and his subsequent departure from the newspaper.

He continued to publish articles in Témoignage chrétien, Politique Hebdo or Politis, and took part in the special numbers of the Nouvel Observateur. In 1985, Bourdet was a member of the "Jury of Honor" that assessed whatever the film Des terroristes à la retraite should be aired in France or not. The "Jury of Honor" in its report stated "though it is highly desirable that a film inform French of all generations about the saga of the FTP-MOI, such a film nevertheless still remains to be made". Bourdet called the film "racist and anti-Semitic".

== Bibliography ==
- Le Schisme Yougoslave, 1950 (Editions de Minuit)
- Les Chemins de l'Unité, 1964 (Maspero)
- A qui appartient Paris, 1972 (Le Seuil)
- L'Aventure incertaine, de la résistance à la restauration, 1975 (Stock)
- L’Europe truquée. Supranationaliste, pacte atlantique, force de frappe, 1977 (Seghers)
- Mes batailles, 1993 (In fine)
- L'Afrique, l’aventure d’Albarka, Jean Suret-Canal et Claude Bourdet, 1973 (éd. du Burin-Martinsart)

== Books ==
- Bowles, Brett (2011). "Historiography, Memory, and the Politics of Form in Mosco Boucault's Terrorists in Retirement". In Sandra Ott (ed.). War, Exile, Justice, and Everyday Life, 1936–1946. Reno: University of Nevada. pp. 191–224. ISBN 978-1-935709-09-1.
