= The Drag (play) =

Play by Mae West

- Written by: Mae West
- Setting: New York City

Premiere
- Date: January 1927
- Place: New Jersey and Connecticut

The Drag is a dramatic play written by Mae West under her pen name Jane Mast. The play opened in out-of-town tryouts in New Jersey and Connecticut, but was later forced to close for its portrayal of homosexuality and cross-dressing. The play never opened on Broadway, as West had planned. This play was the follow-up to West's highly controversial play Sex.

== Inception ==
West claimed that the inspiration behind the play came from the homosexual young men that she knew around that time who, according to her, desperately wanted to be open about their relationships with their male lovers.

With the success of The Captive, a play about two women with lesbian overtones, West set out to create a counter piece that dealt with male gay life. The Drag was said to make open digs at The Captive and its palatable writing, performing satirical songs such as "The Woman Who Stole My Gal".

West auditioned and cast exclusively gay actors from a Greenwich Village club. Rehearsals for The Drag occurred later at night, after West had finished performing in Sex. These rehearsals were largely improvisational, allowing the cast of 12 principal characters to invent the script themselves. The final scene consisted of a giant Drag Ball with little dramatic function that utilized an extended company of performers. Although this open form of performance encouraged a celebration of the liberated gay man, the play formed a dark underbelly that alluded to the drug addiction and violence that riddled gay life in New York City at that time.

== Plot ==
=== Act One ===
The play opens in the library of Dr. James Richmond's New York mansion. Dr. Richmond believes that homosexuals can be treated through conversion therapy, and explains his theory to his close friend and brother-in-law Judge Robert Kingsbury. Judge Kingsbury believes that homosexuals are deviants who need to be controlled by the law. His son, Roland "Rolly", is married to Richmond's daughter Clair.

Two gay men then request an appointment with Dr. Richmond after office hours. One of the men, Clem Hathaway, has brought his friend, David Caldwell, because he is pathologically depressed. During their session, David admits that he had a lover who left him recently, and has allegedly taken up with another man. Dr. Richmond sedates him and leaves him in his office to rest.

Clair is then shown casually telling her father that she wants to make a European trip without her husband. She later confides to her Aunt Barbara that Rolly has no interest in a sexual relationship with her. Rolly readily agrees to his wife's European holiday. While away, Clair is seen at a social event with Allen Greyson, an architect, who is also one of Rolly's business associates.

When David groggily stumbles in from the office, he and Rolly instantly recognize each other as ex-lovers. The doctor reenters to find them struggling and assumes his drugged patient has become violent. Afterwards, Richmond tells Rolly "Thank God you're not what he is."

=== Act Two ===
The second act opens in the Kingsbury residence drawing room, later that afternoon. Parsons, the family butler, admits three obviously effeminate men who have come to plan a weekend party with Rolly. When Allen Greyson arrives, Rolly asks his friends to behave themselves. Allen has come to talk about an industrial building he is designing for the Kingsbury works.

After the other men have left, Rolly explains to Allen that he married Clair not just because it was encouraged by their two families, but because it provided a convenient cloak for his homosexuality. Rolly tells Allen that he is in love with him, but Allen is appalled because he has fallen in love with Clair. He threatens to quit, but Rolly persuades him to reconsider. Allen, no longer feeling an obligation to respect Rolly's marriage, proclaims his love to Clair, who is not displeased.

=== Act Three ===
Act Three opens in the drawing room of the Kingsbury mansion, which has been converted into a small ballroom. A drag ball is in full swing, with bizarrely attired transvestites and an onstage jazz band. Accompanying the solo songs and dances is a great deal of suggestive banter.

When the party gets too rowdy, Rolly sends the partygoers home and goes upstairs. A shot is heard off stage. Parsons the butler enters, clearly shaken. He phones Judge Kingsbury, telling him that Rolly has been shot.

A police detective and Judge Kingsbury come to the mansion the morning of the next day. Parsons tells them of the argument Rolly had with Allen, and of his later seeing Clair in the arms of Allen. Allen becomes the prime suspect.

David then arrives with Dr. Richmond, and confesses to Kingsbury that he killed Rolly, and that they were once lovers. The doctor pleads with the judge to be compassionate. The judge, wanting to avoid the scandal of his son and the two families being linked to the homosexual world in a murder investigation, tells the inspector to report the shooting as a suicide.

== Reception ==
The play was a great financial success, reportedly earning West $30,000 on its opening night, but was widely panned by critics for its open portrayal of homosexuality. It was closed during its premiere run after two weeks.

The Society for the Prevention of Vice warned the producers that if the play continued, all Broadway productions that season would be scrutinized and censored. The Deputy Police Commissioner at the time issued a police raid of The Captive, Sex, and Virgin Man on February 9, 1927. West was tried and found guilty, sentenced to 10 days in jail and fined $500. Upon her release, West reportedly announced that “A few days in the pen ‘n' a $500 fine ain’t too bad a deal”. West then donated to the women’s prison and established the Mae West Memorial Library and continued with other artistic endeavors.

Theatre scholar Jordan Schildcrout examines the production history of the play and its representation of gay characters in Murder Most Queer: The Homicidal Homosexual in the American Theater (2014).

The play was performed again throughout June 2019 at Gay City, an LGBT community center in Seattle.

== The Pleasure Man ==
In 1928, West opened a re-worked version of The Drag titled The Pleasure Man. While the lead role of Rolly was replaced with a heterosexual character, the play still experienced backlash for its overtly sexual content.
