= Samuel J. Friedman Theatre =

Broadway theater in Manhattan, New York

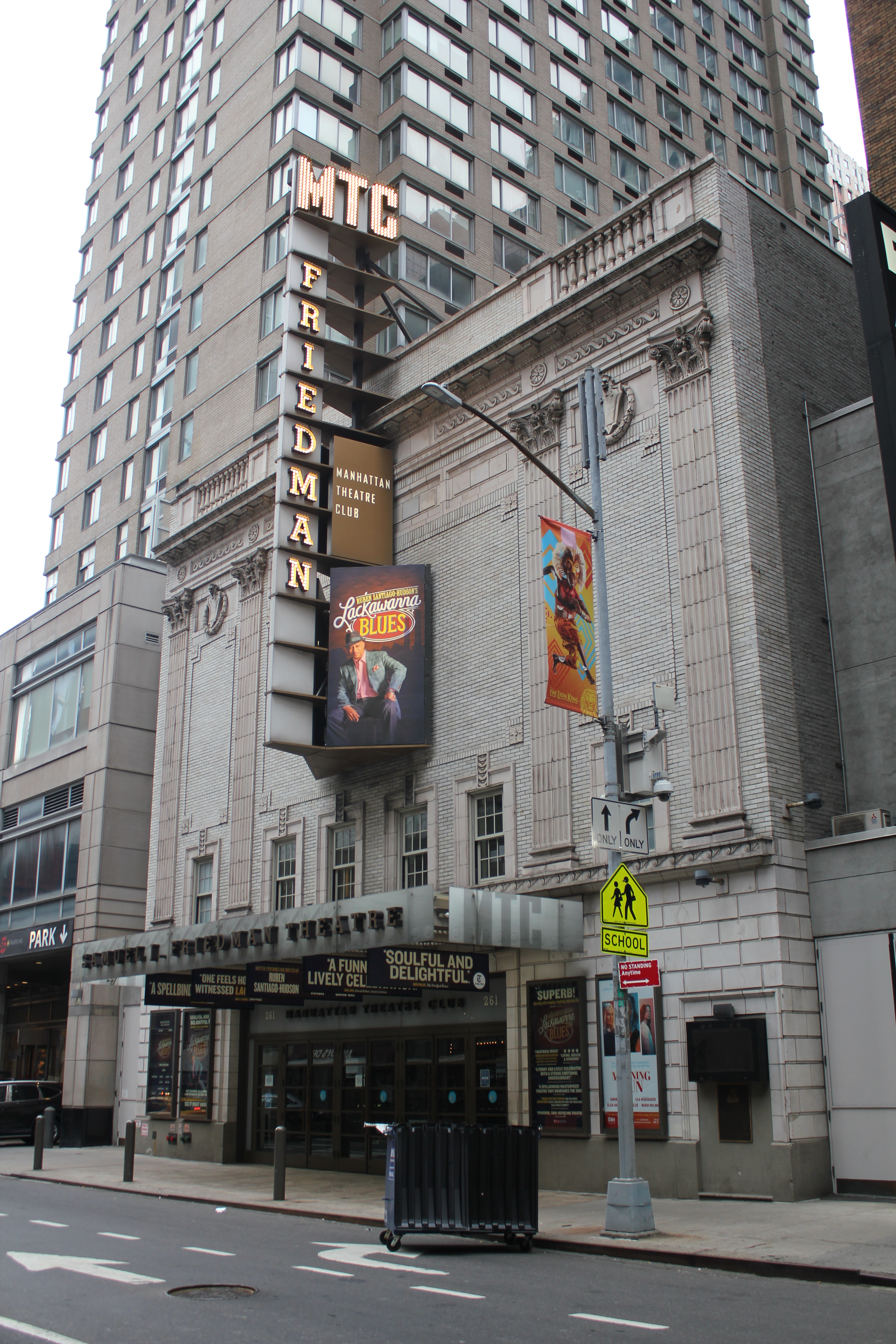
- Samuel J. Friedman Theatre in 2021
- Interactive map of Samuel J. Friedman Theatre
- Former names: Biltmore Theatre (1925–2008)
- Address: 261 West 47th Street; Manhattan, New York; U.S.
- Coordinates: 40°45′37″N 73°59′12″W
- Owner: Manhattan Theatre Club
- Capacity: 650
- Type: Broadway

Construction
- Opened: December 7, 1925 (100 years ago)
- Architect: Herbert J. Krapp

U.S. National Register of Historic Places
- Designated: October 27, 2004
- Reference no.: 04001203
- Designated entity: Theater

New York State Register of Historic Places
- Designated: April 20, 2004
- Reference no.: 06101.012272
- Designated entity: Theater

New York City Landmark
- Designated: November 10, 1987
- Reference no.: 1320
- Designated entity: Auditorium interior

The Samuel J. Friedman Theatre, formerly the Biltmore Theatre, is a Broadway theater at 261 West 47th Street in the Theater District of Midtown Manhattan in New York City, New York, U.S. Opened in 1925, it was designed by Herbert J. Krapp in the neo-Renaissance style and was constructed for Irwin Chanin. It has 650 seats across two levels and is operated by the Manhattan Theatre Club (MTC). The auditorium interior is a New York City landmark, and the theater is listed on the National Register of Historic Places. Since 2008, the theater has been named for Broadway publicist Samuel J. Friedman (1912–1974), whose family was a major donor to MTC.

The facade is largely designed in terracotta and buff-colored brick. The ground floor, which contains the theater's entrance, is shielded by a marquee. The upper stories are divided into bays separated by fluted pilasters, and the facade is topped by an entablature and balustrade. The auditorium contains neo-Renaissance detailing, a raked orchestra level, a large balcony, and a shallow domed ceiling. The basement contains MTC's gift shop and the Susan and Peter J. Solomon Family Lounge, while a mezzanine level contains another lounge. There are also false box seats near the front of the auditorium, flanking the proscenium arch. The modern configuration of the theater dates to a 2000s renovation, when the auditorium's capacity was shrunk, allowing the addition of MTC's lounges and offices behind it.

The Biltmore Theatre was Chanin's second Broadway theater, opening on December 7, 1925, with the play Easy Come Easy Go. The Biltmore largely hosted flops during the late 1920s and early 1930s. It was leased by the Federal Theatre Project of the Works Progress Administration in 1936, before being acquired by Warner Bros. The Biltmore was a CBS radio and television studio from 1952 to 1961, when producer David Cogan turned the Biltmore back into a legitimate theater. Cogan sold the Biltmore in 1986, and it fell into disrepair after a fire in late 1987. Though the theater was sold several times afterward, including to the Nederlander Organization and Stewart F. Lane in 1993, it was not restored until MTC agreed to operate the theater in 2001. The theater reopened in 2003, and MTC took ownership of the Friedman after it was renamed in 2008.

== Site ==
The Samuel J. Friedman Theatre is on 261 West 47th Street, on the north sidewalk between Eighth Avenue and Broadway, near Times Square in the Theater District of Midtown Manhattan in New York City, New York, U.S. The trapezoidal land lot covers 8,800 ft^{2} (820 m^{2}), with a frontage of 75 ft (23 m) on 47th Street and a depth of 126 ft (38 m). The Friedman shares the block with the Ethel Barrymore Theatre, Longacre Theatre, and Morgan Stanley Building to the east. Other nearby buildings include the Eugene O'Neill Theatre and Walter Kerr Theatre to the north; Crowne Plaza Times Square Manhattan to the northeast; the Hotel Edison and Lunt-Fontanne Theatre to the southeast; the Lena Horne (formerly Brooks Atkinson) Theatre and Paramount Hotel to the south; and the off-Broadway 47th Street Theatre to the west. The Friedman Theatre's site had previously contained three five-story apartment buildings.

== Design ==
The Samuel J. Friedman Theatre, originally the Biltmore Theatre, was designed by Herbert J. Krapp in the neo-Renaissance style and was constructed in 1925 for the Chanin brothers. Since 2008, the theater has been named for Samuel J. Friedman (1912–1974), a press agent; his children made a large donation to the theater through the Dr. Gerald J. and Dorothy R. Friedman Foundation. The Friedman is operated by the Manhattan Theatre Club (MTC), a nonprofit theater company. The theater's modern configuration dates to an early-2000s renovation by Polshek Partnership.

=== Facade ===
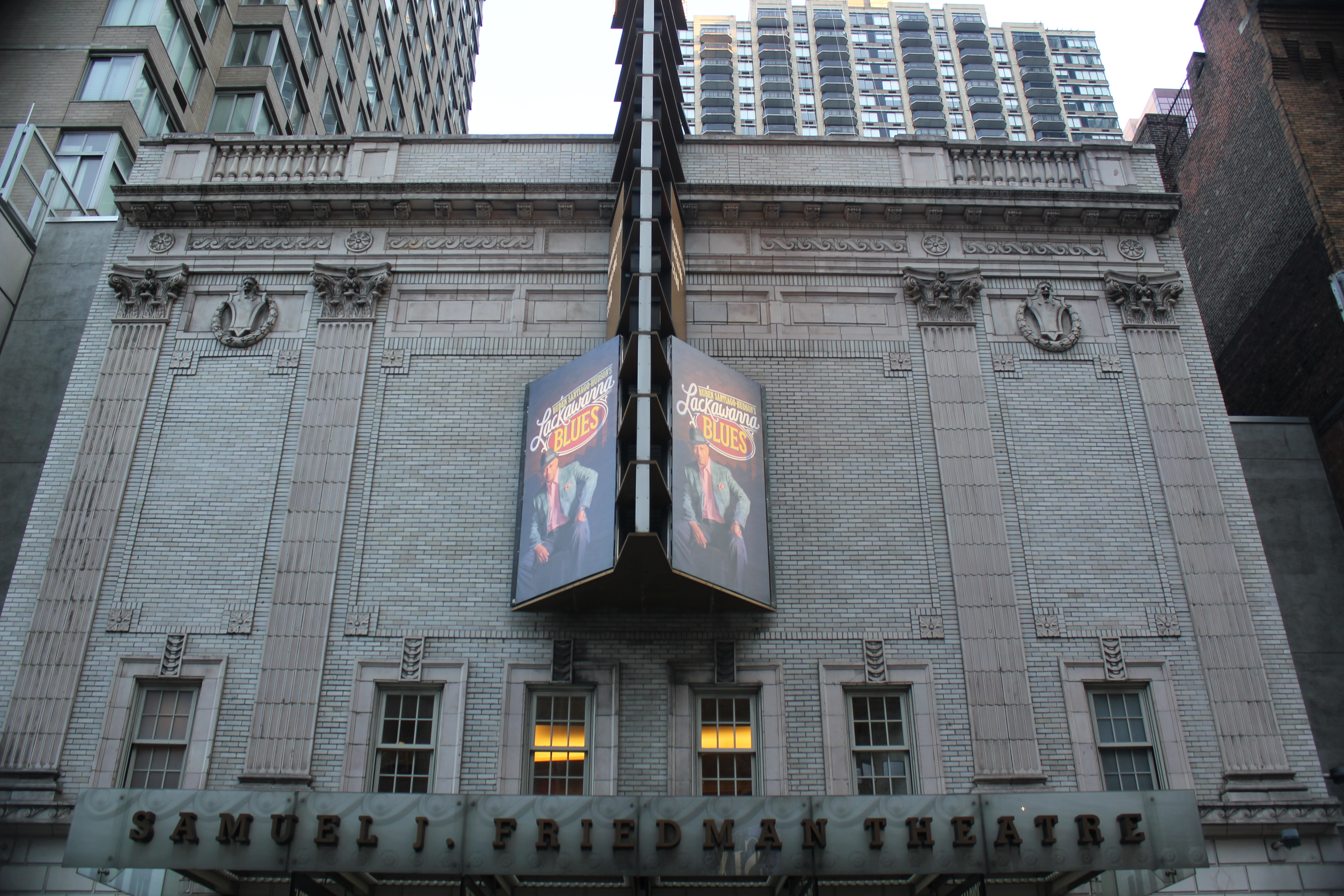
The facade as seen from across 47th Street

The facade is designed in the Italian Renaissance Revival style with low-relief classical ornamentation. It is made of glazed white brick with white terracotta decorations. The first story of the facade is symmetrically arranged and is faced with rusticated terracotta blocks. The center of the first story contains the main entrance to the theater, with glass-and-metal doors connecting with the box office lobby. Sign boards are placed on either side of the main entrance, and a frieze runs above the first story. A metal marquee, installed during the theater's 2000s renovation, hangs above the entrance. The marquee contains the letters "Samuel J. Friedman Theatre", which were installed when the theater was renamed in 2008. There are enclosed alleys on either side of the theater.

The facade's upper stories are divided into three vertical bays, separated by four fluted terracotta pilasters with composite-style capitals. The central bay contains four windows at the second story, while the outer stories each contain one window. All of the second-story windows are six-over-six double hung windows, placed within terracotta surrounds. Above these windows, there are rectangular brick panels at the third and fourth stories, with terracotta floral decorations at each corner. A lighted sign with the theater's name is placed in front of the central bay's panel. The outer bays are topped by short, rectangular terracotta panels, which contain cartouches with molded wreaths. Similar rectangular terracotta panels are placed above the center bay. These are surrounded by bands of stretcher brick.

The pilasters support an entablature near the top of the facade. The entablature contains a frieze with molded rosettes above each pilaster, interspersed with wave moldings above the bays. The frieze is topped by a cornice with modillions and dentils. Above the cornice, the center bay has a brick parapet while the other bays have blind balustrades. During the theater's 2000s renovation, the roof was rebuilt with a steel frame, and HVAC and electrical systems were placed on the roof slab.

=== Interior ===
==== Auditorium ====
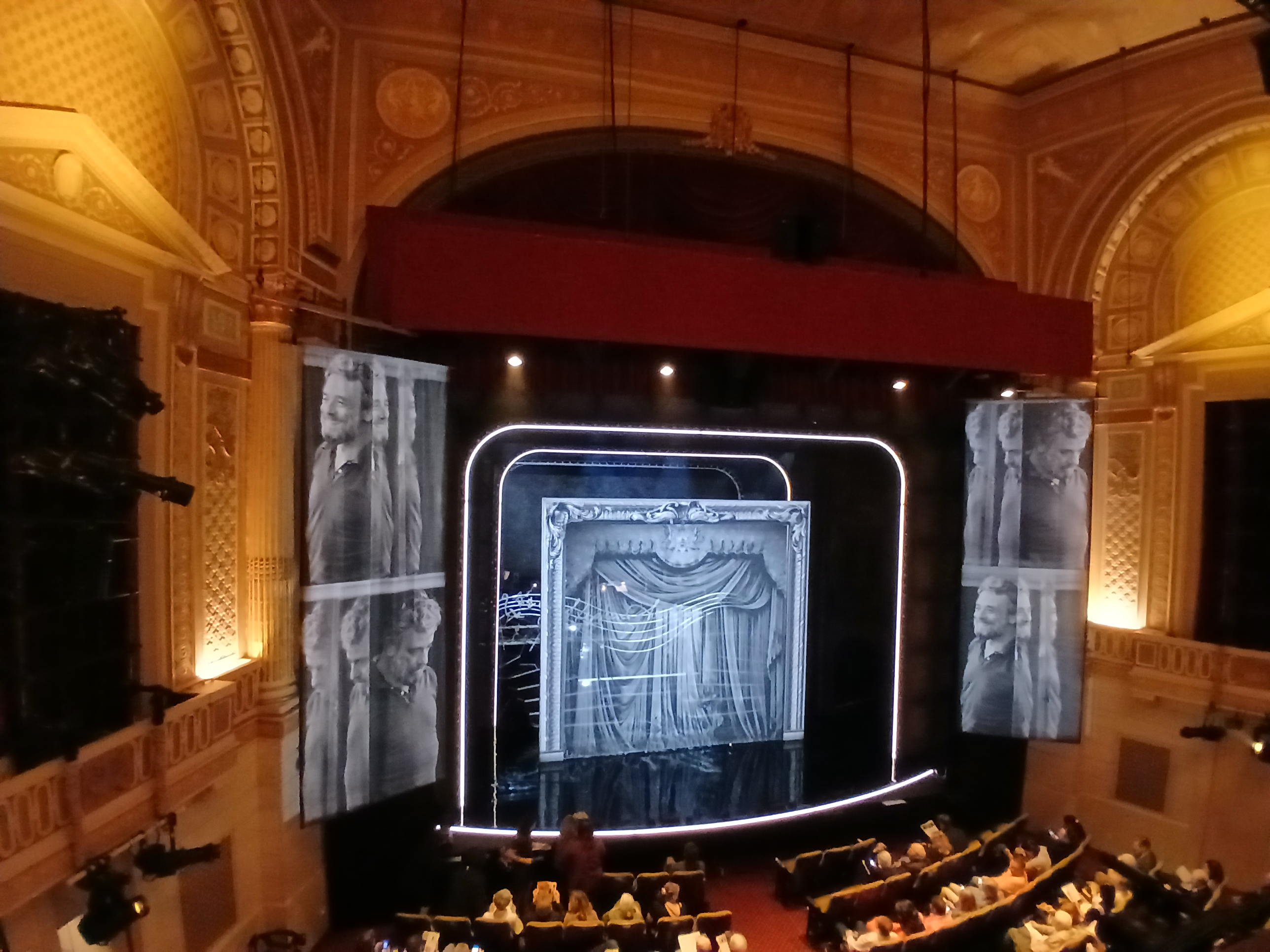
Interior of the auditorium as seen from the left balcony level

The auditorium has an orchestra level, one balcony, and a stage behind the proscenium arch; there are false boxes flanking the stage. In contrast to Krapp's earlier works, the auditorium is shaped like a horseshoe in plan and is oriented on a slightly diagonal axis relative to its site. The space is designed with plaster decorations in relief. The Friedman is one of the smaller Broadway theaters. The Broadway League cites the theater as having a capacity of 650 seats, while Playbill cites 637 seats. The first two rows of the orchestra can be removed to provide as few as 600 seats for small productions. Prior to a renovation in 2001, the theater had 948 seats. The entire theater is wheelchair-accessible via an elevator at the rear of the auditorium. Because MTC did not want the auditorium's sound to be amplified, the auditorium has carpets only in the aisles, and the seats have hard backs. On average, the new seats are 20 to 22 in (510 to 560 mm) wide and have 32 in (810 mm) of legroom.

The Friedman and Rodgers were the Chanins' only two Broadway theaters that Krapp designed in the Adam style. His other four theaters for the family (the Brooks Atkinson, Majestic, John Golden, and Bernard B. Jacobs) were designed in a Spanish style. Since its renovation, the interior has been decorated in a cream and brown color scheme, with red and blue highlights.

===== Seating areas =====
The rear (south) end of the orchestra contains a promenade. The orchestra is raked; the angle of the rake was increased in the 2000s by excavating the front of the orchestra and raising the rear. The rear wall was moved forward by 20 ft (6.1 m) compared to its original position, creating space for the lobby behind it. Prior to the renovation, the front doors opened directly into the orchestra, and there was no lobby. This was in part because the original seating capacity was small compared to other Broadway theaters, making the Biltmore relatively unprofitable and prompting subsequent owners to extend the orchestra seating backward. The modern orchestra is several steps up from the lobby. There is an aisle through the center of the orchestra; it had to be retained during the renovation, despite MTC's desire for center seats with unobstructed views.

The orchestra's rear and side walls are curved and are covered in paneled wainscoting. The center of the orchestra's rear wall contains doors that connect with the lobby. Fire exit doors at either end lead to alleys. Staircases to the balcony are placed within doorways on either side of the lobby doors. The outside edges of the staircases contain plaster walls with rectangular panels, which are delineated by molded bands; the walls contain iron brackets with wooden handrails. The inside edges of the staircases have iron balustrades with wooden railings, as well as ornamented newel posts. The two staircases were rebuilt during the 2000s renovation, since they were necessary to reduce congestion.

The balcony is raked, with a large central seating area and two smaller sections on the sides. There are decorative iron railings surrounding the staircases from the orchestra to the balcony. A technical booth was installed on the rear wall, and lighting sconces were originally placed on the walls. Before its renovation, the balcony level was divided into front and rear sections by an aisle halfway across its depth. In the 2000s, the balcony was rebuilt on a corrugated steel-framed deck atop a concrete slab. The modern balcony has vomitories on either side, which lead down to a vaulted passageway. The side walls of the balcony have pairs of engaged pilasters, above which is a wide frieze containing panels with shields. In front of the balcony are medallions with golden silhouettes, as well as panels. The balcony has low-relief plasterwork panels on its underside, which originally had medallions with small overhanging chandeliers.

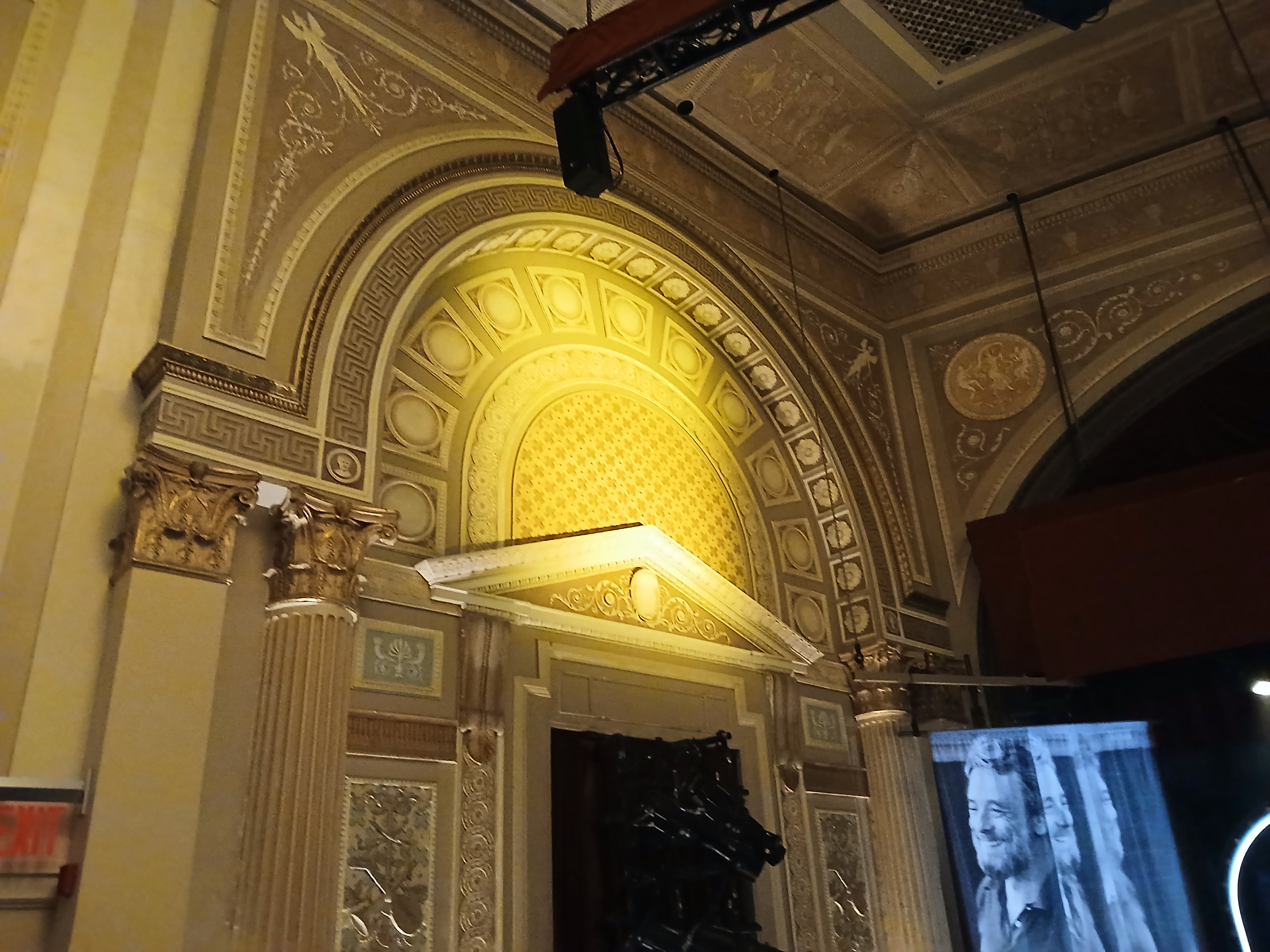
Detail of the left-hand wall, with a false box

On either side of the proscenium is a wall section with a false box. At orchestra level, the wall sections on each side are paneled and contain doorways. The modern walls contain paneling in front of the original cast stone; the left-hand doorway leads to the dressing room. Console brackets support the false boxes at balcony level, which contain rectangular openings with triangular Adam-style pediments above them. The box openings are surrounded by panels with motifs of musical instruments. On either side of each box opening are fluted pilasters and columns, topped by capitals in a modified Ionic style. Above the boxes are lunettes with cameo motifs, as well as archways. The spandrels above the corners of each arch have relief panels. During the renovations, lighting booms were installed in front of the boxes, and draperies were placed behind the booms to draw attention away from the boom.

===== Other design features =====
Next to the false boxes is a proscenium arch. The archway is surrounded by a rope molding, and there is a cartouche above the middle of the proscenium. The spandrels above the arch's corners contain Adam-style ornamentation. The stage extends behind the proscenium. When the theater was renovated, the stage was lowered significantly to accommodate MTC's productions, which were more intimate compared to other Broadway theatrical productions. (Note: The new stage is cited as being either 1 ft (30 cm) or 20 in (51 cm) below the original stage level.) The stage lighting was designed by Fisher Dachs Associates and was intended to be sufficient for about 90 percent of MTC's productions. The diagonal orientation of the theater complicated the installation of the new rigging, which was typically placed perpendicularly to the proscenium. Of the Friedman's 40 line sets, 39 are aligned with the proscenium and the other is aligned to the rear wall. A red house curtain and a fire curtain were also installed.

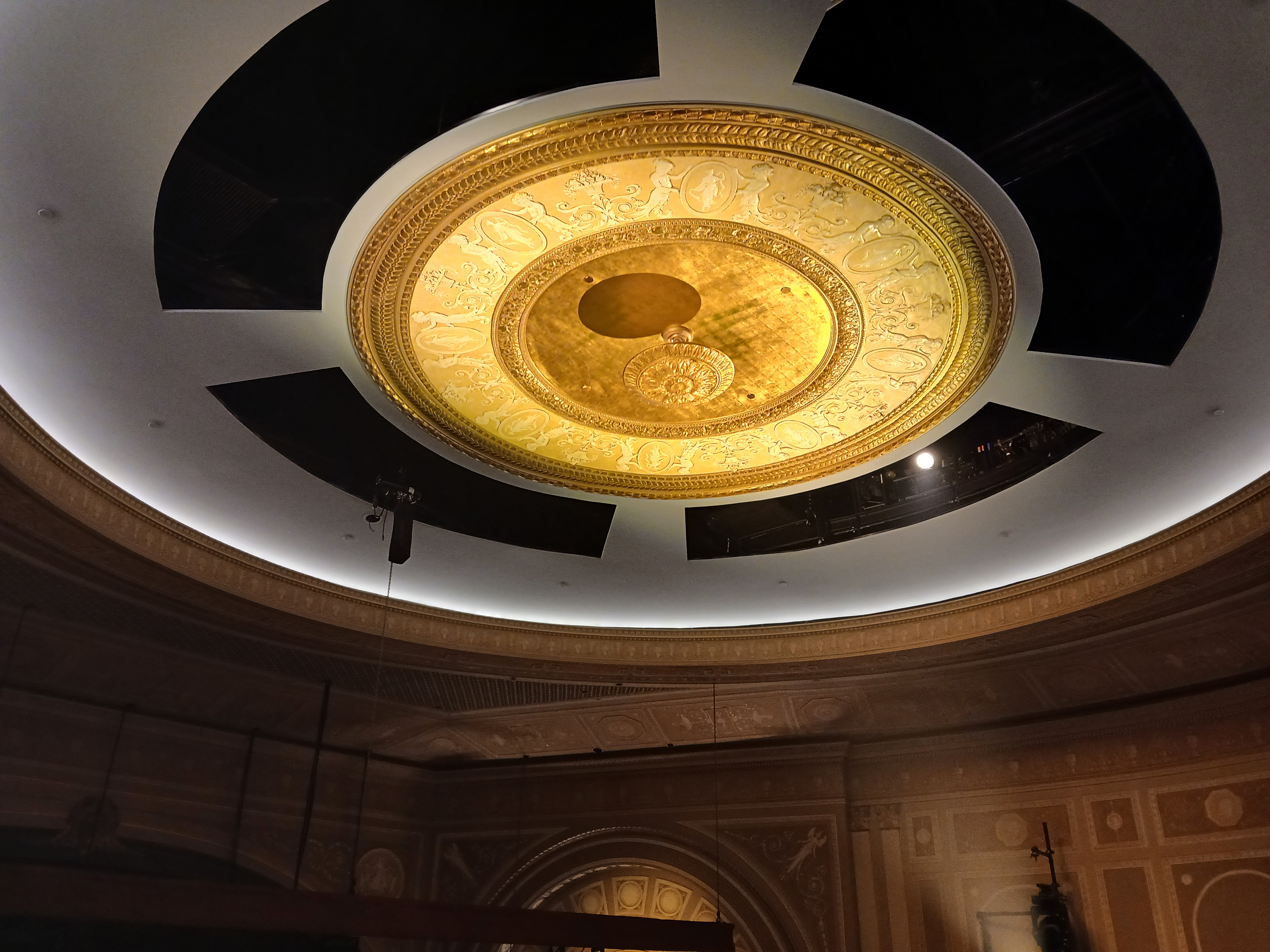
Detail of the ceiling

The ceiling has an oval dome at its center, with Adam-style moldings around the border of the dome and an Adam-style centerpiece. During the theater's renovation, four openings were drilled into the dome, and a catwalk for the stage lights was placed above the ceiling. The installation of the catwalk and the dome's openings removed the need for a large lighting structure in front of the proscenium. The rest of the ceiling has molded bands that divide the surface into paneled sections. An Adam-style cornice runs along the walls just below the ceiling. There are also air-conditioning vents in the ceiling.

==== Other interior spaces ====
During the theater's renovation, a basement was excavated from the bedrock. The basement, which is about 19 ft (5.8 m) deep, was excavated by local contractor John Civetta & Sons, which removed about 3,000 ft^{3} (85 m^{3}) of rock. The basement was excavated into a layer of soft rock, so the contractors poured a concrete slab across the new basement level. The basement contains a patrons' lounge, known as the Susan and Peter J. Solomon Family Lounge. The lounge is named for Peter J. Solomon, chairman of MTC's board from 1997 to 2010, as well as his wife Susan. The basement also contains the Manhattan Theatre Club's gift shop and restrooms, as well as MTC offices and staff spaces.

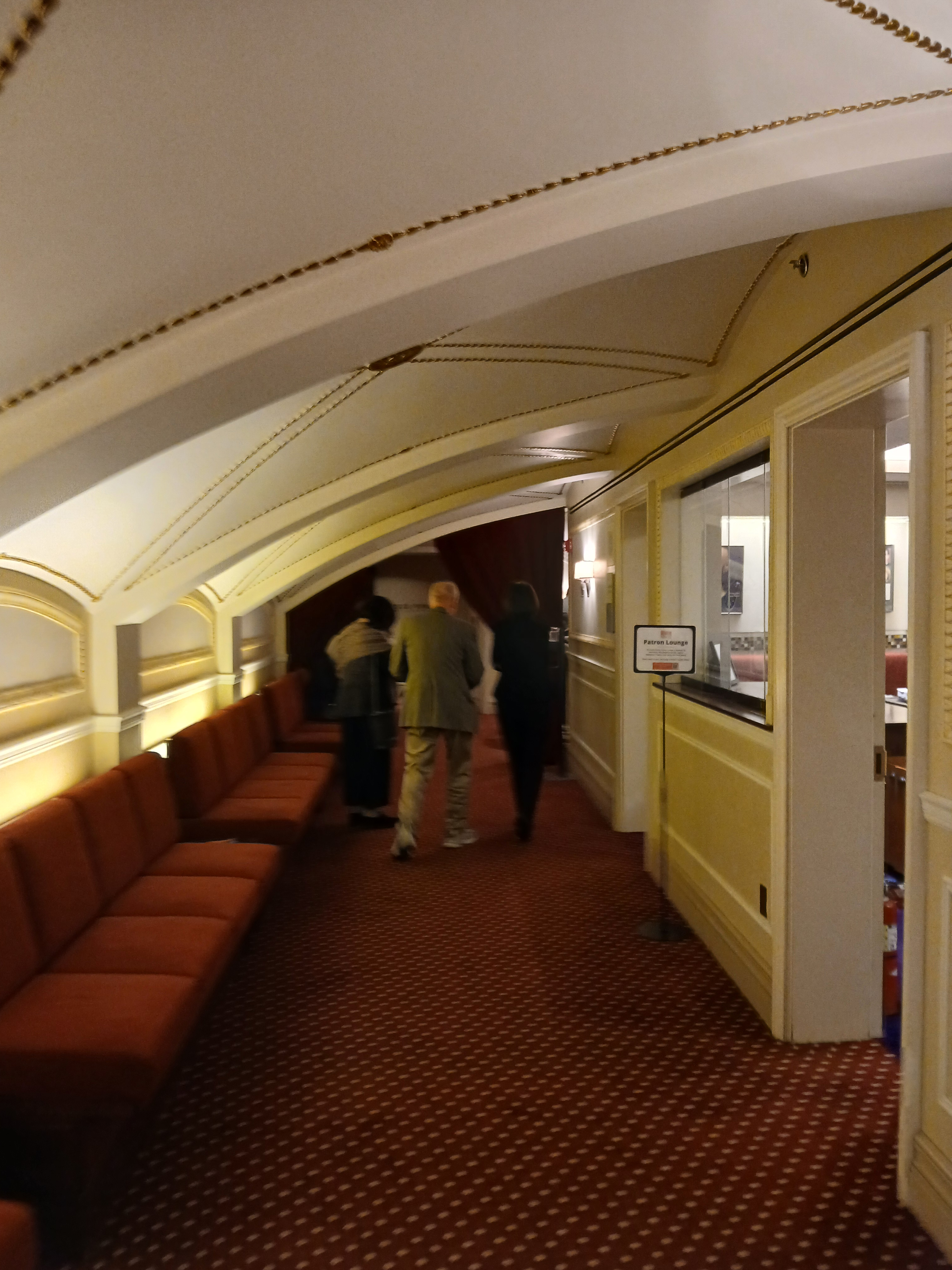
The vaulted passageway, which is on an intermediate level between the orchestra and balcony

The vomitories on either side of the balcony lead down to a vaulted passageway, which is on an intermediate level between the orchestra and balcony. The passageway is also accessible from the stairs at the rear of the auditorium. The walls of the passageway have wooden baseboards and moldings, above which are plaster walls with moldings. The ceiling of the passageway has plaster vaults. The modern design of the vaults dates to the 2000s renovation. Beyond the passageway are secondary spaces. This level includes a private lounge for MTC subscribers. There is another mezzanine above the balcony level, but it does not have any historical decorative elements. It contains another private lounge.

== History ==
Times Square became the epicenter for large-scale theater productions between 1900 and the Great Depression. During the 1900s and 1910s, many theaters in Midtown Manhattan were developed by the Shubert brothers, one of the major theatrical syndicates of the time. The Chanin brothers developed another grouping of theaters in the mid-1920s. Though the Chanins largely specialized in real estate rather than theaters, Irwin Chanin had become interested in theater when he was an impoverished student at the Cooper Union. He subsequently recalled that he had been "humiliated" by having to use a separate door whenever he bought cheap seats in an upper balcony level.

=== Initial Broadway run ===
==== Chanin operation ====
Irwin Chanin was a newcomer to the Broadway theater industry when he was developing his first theater, the 46th Street (now Richard Rodgers). Chanin hired Herbert Krapp, an experienced architect who had designed multiple Broadway theaters for the Shubert brothers. The 46th Street Theatre opened in early 1925 as Chanin's first Broadway theater. Chanin retained Krapp to design the Biltmore and Mansfield theaters on 47th Street, which at the time was a largely residential street. Chanin purchased the lots at 261–265 West 47th Street, in November 1924 for $250,000. After Chanin acquired the property title to the two theater sites on 47th Street in March 1925, Krapp filed plans for the Biltmore the same month. Krapp designed the facade of the Biltmore in a more ornate manner than his previous commissions for the Shuberts. Irwin Chanin, who built the theater with his brother Henry, wished to lure visitors with architecture because they did not have the booking chain or an established reputation in the theatrical industry. The Biltmore was the first theater on 47th Street's northern sidewalk.

The Biltmore opened on December 7, 1925, with the play Easy Come Easy Go, which transferred from another theater. It was the Chanins' second Broadway venue and was mainly intended for comedies and small productions, unlike the brothers' other venues. Theatrical historian Ken Bloom described the Biltmore's early productions as "for the most part, unexceptional". The Biltmore's shows in 1926 included the comedies Kongo, starring Walter Huston for 135 performances, and Loose Ankles, featuring Osgood Perkinsfor 161 performances. The next year, the Biltmore hosted The Barker with Huston and Claudette Colbert, as well as the comedy Jimmie's Women and the Noël Coward play The Marquise. S. H. Stone purchased the Biltmore Theatre for $2.4 million in November 1927, leasing it back to the Chanins for 21 years. Numerous flops were shown at the Biltmore in 1928, including Tin Pan Alley with Colbert, which had 77 performances. The same year saw Mae West's Pleasure Man, which closed after the cast was arrested for "indecency" on opening night. Seven more flops followed in 1929.

One of the first new productions of the 1930s was Edwin Justus Mayer's Children of Darkness, which ran for 79 performances in 1930. Another relatively long production during this time was George Kelly's Philip Goes Forth, with 98 performances in 1931. In general, most productions at the Biltmore in the early 1930s were unsuccessful. Among the short-lived works during this time were Her Supporting Cast in 1931; Zombie, Border-land, and Carry Nation in 1932; and The Scorpion in 1933. The Continental Bank and Trust Company sued in 1932 to foreclose on a $550,000 mortgage on the theater, held by the Chanins. Big Hearted Herbert, which opened on New Year's Day 1934, was the theater's next hit, with 154 performances. The First Legion later that year was another minor hit, followed by more flops such as a 15-performance run of Fyodor Dostoevsky's Crime and Punishment.

==== WPA and Warner Bros. operation ====
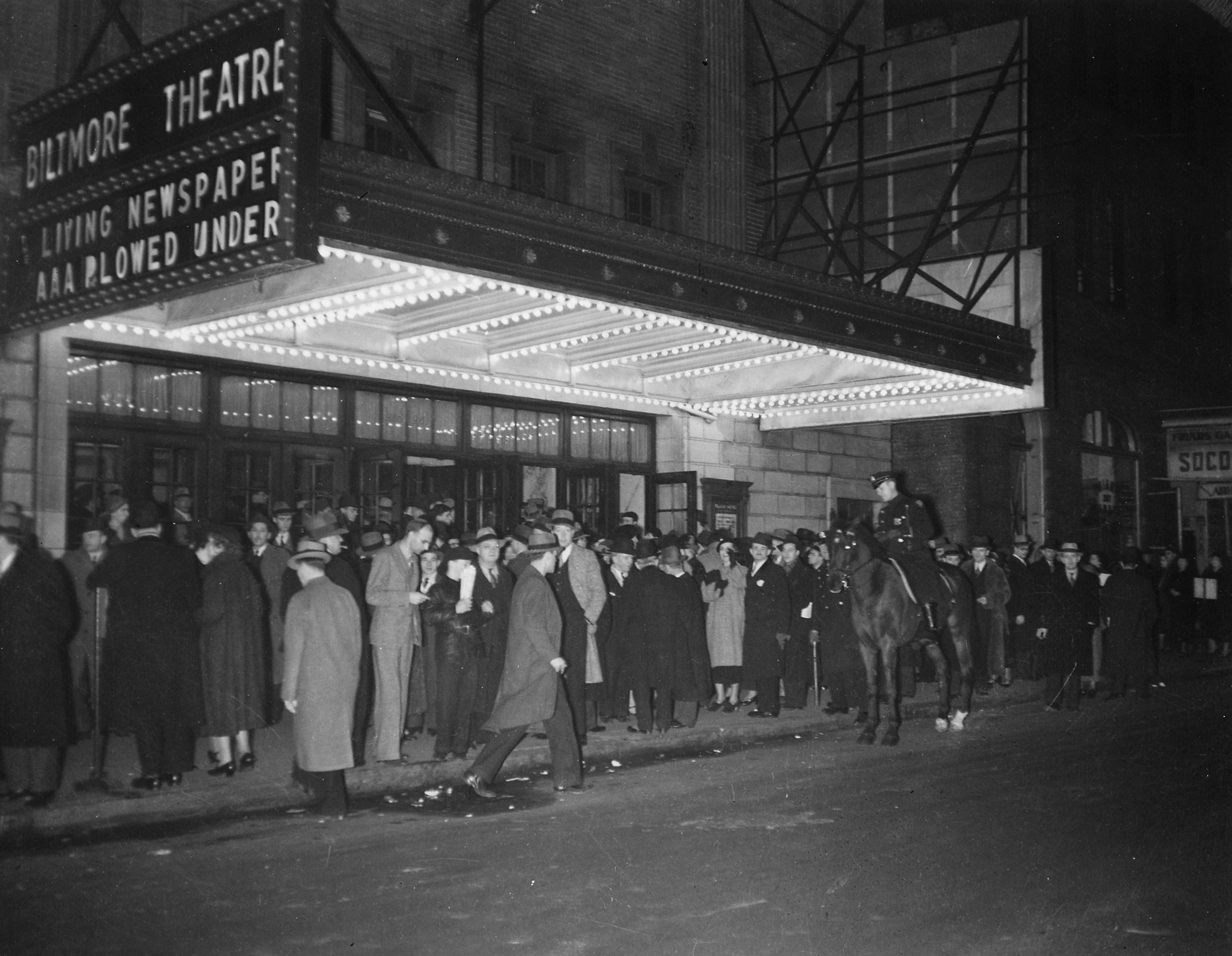
A crowd in front of the theater for Triple-A Plowed Under (1935)

The Chanins ultimately lost control of the Biltmore and their other theaters during the Depression. In December 1935, the Works Progress Administration (WPA) leased the Biltmore Theatre. The WPA used the theater for the Federal Theatre Project (FTP)'s Living Newspaper, which presented factual information on current events in theatrical form. The first Living Newspaper, Ethiopia, never opened to the public because the federal government issued a censorship order prohibiting the impersonation of heads of state onstage. The second Living Newspaper production was Triple-A Plowed Under, which opened in March 1936. Other WPA productions included the Living Newspaper's 1935 in May 1936 and Injunction Granted in July, as well as the marionette show Stars on Strings in June.

In October 1936, the theater was sold to a client of Arthur A. Hershkowitz for $150,000. The buyer was subsequently revealed as film distributor Warner Bros., who used the theater to show George Abbott's works. The first of these was Brother Rat, which opened in December 1936 and was the theater's first major success, with 575 performances. Two subsequent Abbott plays, Brown Sugar and All That Glitters, were flops. The next hit at the Biltmore was What a Life, which opened in 1938 and lasted for 538 performances. This was followed in 1939 by Abbott's farce The Primrose Path for 166 performances, as well as See My Lawyer with Milton Berle for 224 performances. By contrast, Ayn Rand's The Unconquered ran for only six performances in 1940, and A. J. Cronin's Jupiter Laughs saw 24 performances the same year.

Ruth McKenney's My Sister Eileen, featuring Shirley Booth, opened at the end of 1940 and transferred to another theater in 1942. At the end of that year, the Biltmore also hosted the final performances of the long-running comedy Janie. F. Hugh Herbert's Kiss and Tell, featuring Joan Caulfield, opened at the Biltmore in March 1943 and ran there for two years before transferring. The Biltmore then hosted Thomas Job's adaptation of Émile Zola's Therese in 1945, which ran for 96 performances. This was followed in 1946 by Jed Harris's Apple of His Eye and Loco, as well as an adaptation of Jean-Paul Sartre's No Exit. Konstantin Simonov's comedy The Whole World Over ran for 100 performances in 1947, and The Heiress premiered at the Biltmore the same year, running for 410 performances. Other hits of the decade included the comedy The Silver Whistle in 1948, which had 219 performances, and the comedy Clutterbuck in 1949, one of the first Broadway shows produced by David Merrick. Billy Budd, which ran for 105 performances in 1951, was among the last legitimate productions played during the Biltmore's initial Broadway run.

=== CBS studio ===
In October 1951, the Warner Bros. and Abbott sold the Biltmore Theatre to Irving Maidman as an investment. At the time of the sale, Abbott's The Number was scheduled to be produced at the Biltmore. After The Number closed, the Columbia Broadcasting System (CBS) leased the theater in February 1952 as a broadcast studio called Studio 62. Among the shows produced at Studio 62 were The Al Pearce Show, Bank on the Stars, The Big Payoff, Dotto, The Egg and I, For Love Or Money, The Herb Shriner Show, The Jack Paar Show, Keep Talking, Strike it Rich, To Tell the Truth, and Two for the Money.

=== First Broadway revival ===
==== 1960s and 1970s ====
The producer David Cogan acquired the Biltmore in August 1960 for $850,000. Cogan announced the next year that he would return the Biltmore to legitimate use and that he would expand the theater from 979 to 1,120 seats. The first production at the revived Biltmore Theatre was Take Her, She's Mine, which opened in December 1961 and starred Art Carney and Elizabeth Ashley for 404 performances. The Neil Simon comedy Barefoot in the Park opened in October 1963, with Ashley and Robert Redford co-starring. Barefoot in the Park ran for about 1,530 performances before its closing in 1967, and it subsequently was adapted into film, becoming associated with the theater. This was followed by several short runs, including The Ninety Day Mistress in December 1967, as well as Staircase and Loot in early 1968.

The rock musical Hair, a transfer from Off-Broadway, premiered at the Biltmore in April 1968. Hair, starring Melba Moore and Diane Keaton, had a total run of 1,750 performances (including off-Broadway) before it closed in 1972. Relatively short runs filled the Biltmore in the 1970s and early 1980s. The play Find Your Way Home with Michael Moriarty opened in 1974. Subsequently, the theater staged Jules Feiffer's Knock Knock with Leonard Frey and Lynn Redgrave, as well as The Robber Bridegroom with Barry Bostwick, in 1976. The next year, the Biltmore held solo appearances from Lily Tomlin in Appearing Nitely, as well as a short-lived revival of Hair. The Biltmore also staged The Effect of Gamma Rays on Man-in-the-Moon Marigolds with Shelley Winters and The Kingfisher with Claudette Colbert, Rex Harrison, and George Rose in 1978. Peter Allen's show Up in One opened at the Biltmore in 1979.

==== 1980s ====
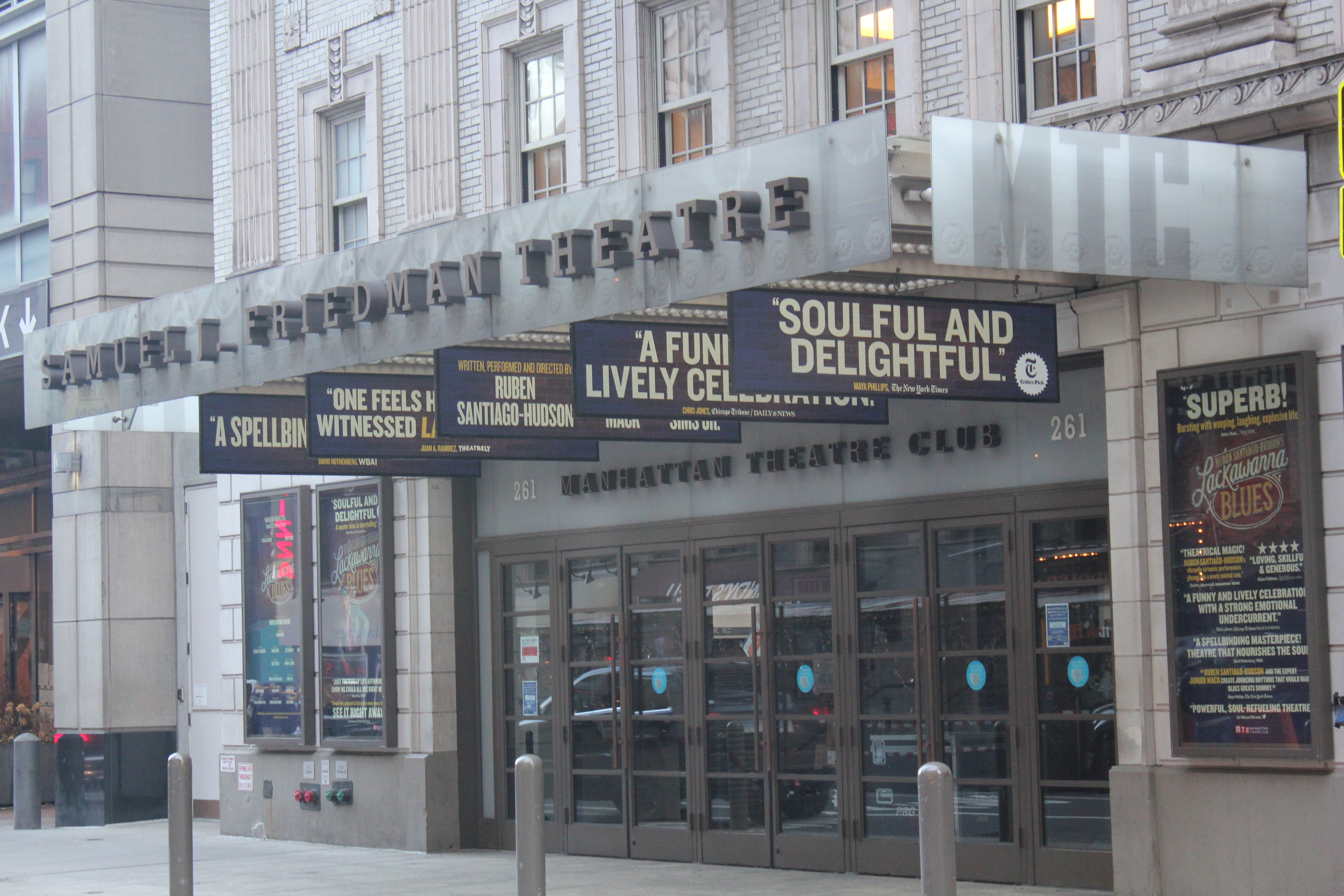
Entrance

The Nederlander Organization negotiated to lease the theater in 1980, ultimately taking it for five years. The same year, the Biltmore hosted Nuts with Anne Twomey and a revival of The American Clock. In 1981, the theater hosted To Grandmother's House We Go with Eva Le Gallienne, as well as A Talent for Murder with Colbert and Jean-Pierre Aumont. The long-running thriller Deathtrap transferred to the Biltmore in 1982, and the mystery play Whodunnit and the musical Doonesbury were staged in 1983. Barbara Rush appeared in the solo A Woman of Independent Means in 1984, but that production closed after only 13 performances. The theater stayed dark for an entire season; at the time, the Broadway industry as a whole was struggling to attract shows. The Nederlander Organization, which had paid $250,000 in rent per year, declined to renew its lease in August 1984.

The New York City Landmarks Preservation Commission (LPC) had started considering protecting the Biltmore as an official city landmark in 1982, with discussions continuing over the next several years. When the first theaters were designated as landmarks in mid-1985, Cogan placed the Biltmore for sale and considered demolishing it. Cogan had paid $250,000 to maintain the theater during the dark 1984–1985 season, a significant financial burden for him since the Biltmore was his only Broadway theater. Cogan quickly secured a buyer who wanted to use the valuable air rights above the theater. The Biltmore hosted Boys of Winter with Matt Dillon at the end of the year, limiting the audience to 499 seats because a 500-seat house would require negotiations with Broadway theatrical unions. In February 1986, Cogan sold the Biltmore to developer Samuel Pfeiffer for an estimated $5 million; Pfeiffer promised to keep the theater operational for at least six months. The theater's last productions of the 20th century were the Black vaudeville Honky Tonk, in 1986, and the revue Stardust, featuring Mitchell Parish's songs in early 1987. Honky Tonk and Stardust also limited their audiences to 499 seats.

The LPC designated the Biltmore's interior as a landmark on November 10, 1987, but the exterior did not receive landmark status. This was part of the LPC's wide-ranging effort in 1987 to grant landmark status to Broadway theaters. On December 11, 1987, a month after the theater was designated as a landmark, the theater's interior caught fire, which the New York City Fire Department quickly determined to be an arson. Trespassers had entered the empty theater several times, and the New York City Police Department found hypodermic needles on the floor. The stage and thirty seats were damaged. While someone identifying themselves as the theater's building manager said they would restore the theater, the LPC was unable to contact Pfeiffer about the fire. Broadway theatrical unions had classified the Biltmore as "endangered" because it was consistently underused. Due to the theater's interior-landmark status, it could not be modified without permission from the LPC.

=== Deterioration and abandonment ===
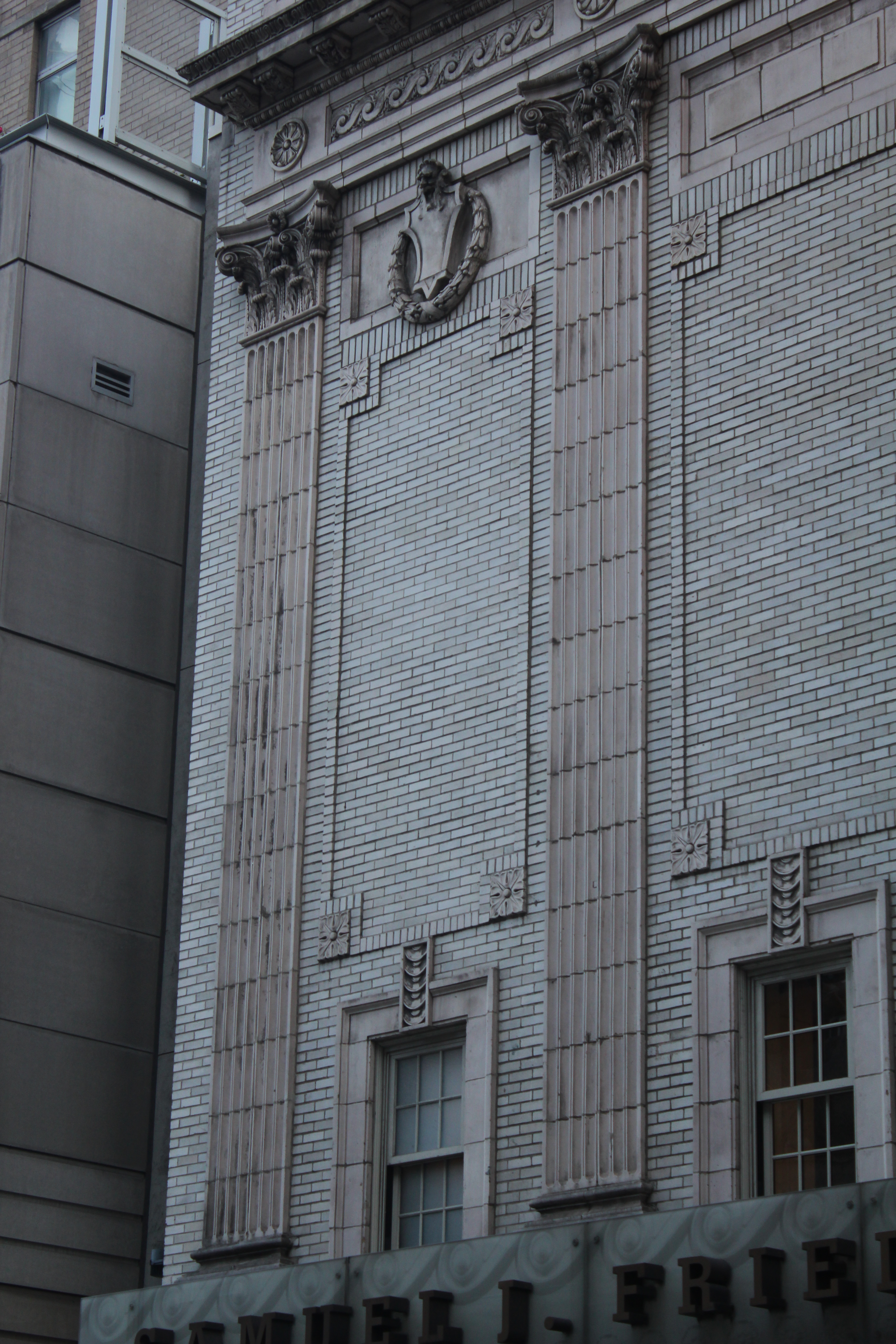
Facade section

By February 1988, Pfeiffer had placed the Biltmore for sale through auctioneer Properties at Auction at a starting price of $4 million. Morris Gluck bought the theater that month for $5.35 million, and the New York City Board of Estimate ratified the landmark designation that March. The Biltmore continued to deteriorate, and the LPC was unable to contact Pfeiffer about the issue; he remained the owner of record because Gluck had not fulfilled several terms of the sale. In August 1988, after two men walked through the smashed front doors to steal chandeliers, the New York City Department of Buildings (DOB) declared the theater to be unsafe. Subsequently, Pfeiffer obtained a court order preventing the DOB from sealing the theater. Jack Goldstein of nonprofit group Save the Theaters said: "It gives the appearance of being owned by somebody who is not interested in running it as anything except into the ground". After Gluck went into default on the down payment for the theater, Properties for Auction sued him.

The theater was placed for auction again in March 1989, but Pfeiffer did not agree to sell at the high bid of $5.25 million. Several developers and theatrical operators started negotiating with Pfeiffer for a potential purchase. The landmark designation required the Biltmore to operate as a legitimate Broadway house if it were renovated or if the air rights above it were used. No further progress occurred until early 1991, when the theater was placed for auction again, without its air rights; this time, Pfeiffer was obligated to take the high bid. Jay Cardwell and David Yakir went into contract to buy the theater for $4 million later that year. Cardwell estimated that a restoration would cost $5–8 million, at which point the theater had falling plaster, charred seats, and water-damaged walls. By February 1992, the sale had not been finalized, but Pfeiffer's $2.25 million mortgage for the theater was in default. Manufacturers and Traders Trust took ownership of the Biltmore after foreclosing on the mortgage.

The Nederlander Organization and Stewart F. Lane acquired the Biltmore in July 1993 as part of an 140 ft-long (43 m) assemblage between 47th and 48th Streets. The new owners sought a low-interest loan from the New York state government, following a similar incentive for Disney's New Amsterdam Theatre. The abandoned Biltmore had holes in the ceiling, through which rainfall leaked, and it suffered from vandalism. LPC chairwoman Jennifer Raab specifically cited the theater as an example of "demolition by neglect". The Nederlanders and Lane also held talks with theatrical stage unions to determine the theater's future use. By early 1996, the theater's owners indicated that these discussions were unsuccessful and that the Biltmore might instead be converted for non-theatrical use. At one point, Lane considered leasing the theater to a delicatessen owner after concluding that restoration as a Broadway theater was infeasible.

In March 1996, the Nederlanders and Lane entered a contract to sell the theater to developer Joseph Moinian for $14.4 million. Moinian also bought five tenements on Eighth Avenue that were owned solely by the Nederlanders. The next year, Moinian announced he would build a 750-key hotel using air rights from the Biltmore and Brooks Atkinson theaters. The historic auditorium would be restored, but it was planned to become part of the hotel's lobby. The LPC rejected Moinian's plan for the Biltmore. Although Moinian was able to obtain additional air rights for his planned hotel, the Nederlanders instead decided to place the property back for sale in April 1999. Moinian sued the Nederlanders in New York Supreme Court that year, alleging that the Nederlanders had inappropriately reneged on the contract. That December, the court ruled in Lane and the Nederlanders' favor. The Nederlanders and Lane indicated their intent to restore the theater while developing the Eighth Avenue site as an apartment complex.

=== Second Broadway revival ===
The Manhattan Theatre Club had become one of New York City's most successful nonprofit theatrical companies in the 1990s. The club had been seeking a Broadway venue since the early 1990s, as a Broadway home would make their productions eligible for the Tony Awards. Duncan Hazard of Polshek Partnership, a longtime friend of MTC artistic director Lynne Meadow, was involved in the search. Hazard was watching The Iceman Cometh at the Brooks Atkinson in 1999 when he saw the Biltmore across the street during intermission. He contacted MTC director of operations Michael Moody, who had previously considered and rejected the Biltmore, but reconsidered after Hazard requested the architectural drawings for the theater.

==== MTC renovation ====
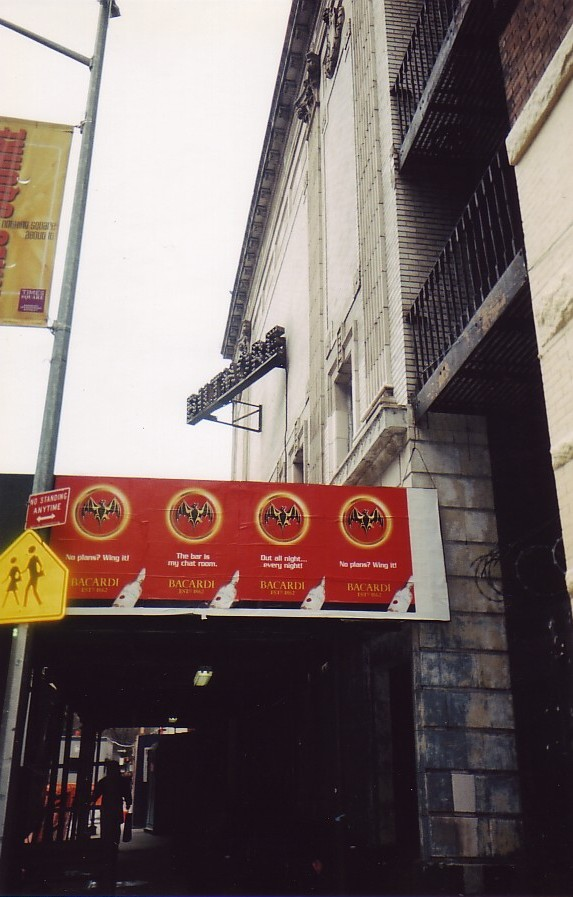
The theater as seen in 2002

In late 2000, MTC proposed taking over the Biltmore and restoring it. Biltmore 47 Associates (a consortium headed by the Jack Parker Corporation), which was planning a neighboring apartment building at Eighth Avenue and 47th Street, had planned to renovate the theater and restore it to legitimate use. In exchange, the development team could increase their apartment building's floor area ratio by 20 percent. The deal required approval from the New York City Department of City Planning. MTC development director Andrew Hamingson recalled that the mechanical room was flooded in three feet of standing water. Many neighborhood residents supported MTC's renovation but opposed the proposed apartments, upon which Biltmore 47 agreed to reduce the size of its building from 61 to 55 stories. The neighboring apartment complex, also known as the Biltmore, was ultimately built as a 51-story structure; the developers had been allowed to build 18 additional stories in exchange for the theater's renovation.

Initially, MTC predicted that the renovation would cost $18 million, but the costs rose to $27 million after additional damage was discovered. Before work started on the theater, Hazard designed a foam model of his proposed modifications and sent it to Meadow, who approved the plans immediately. The plans called for shrinking the theater's capacity by relocating the auditorium's rear wall, which would also provide a "tower" for MTC functions behind the auditorium. To make space for MTC's club facilities, Hazard suggested excavating a basement. The renovation started in December 2001, when MTC launched a $35 million fundraising campaign for the theater. At the time, MTC had raised $20 million, including $5 million from the city government and $4.65 million from Biltmore 47. In addition, Biltmore 47 gave a construction loan of $10.35 million, for a total gift of $15 million. The city's share was increased to $6.4 million, while the MTC board gave $12 million.

Polshek Partnership Architects restored surviving sections of the original theater and EverGreene Architectural Arts restored plasterwork and reconstructed missing parts. EverGreene hired 18 plasterers to replace 70 percent of the plasterwork, including 6,000 ft (1,800 m) of moldings and 2,500 ft^{2} (230 m^{2}) of ornamentation. In addition, John Civetta was hired to excavate the basement lounge, and Severud Associates was hired as the structural engineer. The theater's steel frame was reinforced, and contractors installed seismographs on the walls to monitor whether the excavations were causing damage. The orchestra, balcony, and stairs were reconstructed, with decorative elements being rebuilt to their original designs due to the interior-landmark status. The facade, which was not landmarked, received a new canopy and glass doors. Barbara Spandorf of Fisher Dachs Associates was involved in redesigning the interior for theatrical use.

==== MTC takeover and renaming ====
The theater was officially rededicated on October 15, 2003, and the Biltmore reopened on November 6 with The Violet Hour. The Biltmore received the New York Landmarks Conservancy's Lucy G. Moses Preservation Award, as well as accolades from the Municipal Art Society of New York and the magazine New York Construction. The theater was also added to the National Register of Historic Places in 2004. MTC's first season at the Biltmore was marked with difficulties, including a controversy when Terrence McNally's Dedication was swapped out with The Violet Hour as the inaugural production. In addition, The Violet Hour and the next production, Drowning Crow, both opened to negative reception. By contrast, MTC's second season at the Biltmore (which included Reckless, Brooklyn Boy, and After the Night and the Music) was more successful. During each subsequent season, MTC hosted three plays at the Biltmore.

In June 2008, the Dr. Gerald J. and Dorothy R. Friedman Foundation made a large donation to the MTC, though the amount of the donation was not disclosed. Subsequently, MTC announced it would rename the Biltmore in honor of Samuel J. Friedman before the 2008–2009 season commenced. The theater was renamed at a dedication ceremony held on September 4, 2008, and MTC officially acquired the Friedman the next month. The first production at the renamed theater was To Be or Not to Be. MTC continued its tradition of scheduling three plays a season at the Friedman. The theater closed on March 12, 2020, due to the COVID-19 pandemic, reopening on September 14, 2021, with previews of Ruben Santiago-Hudson's Lackawanna Blues. The theater was again renovated in 2021.

== Notable productions ==
Productions are listed by the year of their first performance. No productions were hosted between 1952 and 1961 or between 1987 and 2003.

=== 1920s to 1980s ===
Notable productions at the theater
Opening year	Name	Refs.
1926	Loose Ankles	
1926	Old Bill, M.P.	
1927	The Marquise	
1928	Pleasure Man	
1929	The Nut Farm	
1932	Carry Nation	
1933	The Family Upstairs	
1936	1935	
1936	Triple-A Plowed Under	
1936	Brother Rat	
1937	Brown Sugar	
1938	What a Life	
1939	The Primrose Path	
1939	See My Lawyer	
1940	The Unconquered	
1940	Jupiter Laughs	
1940	My Sister Eileen	
1943	Kiss and Tell	
1946	No Exit	
1947	The Heiress	
1948	The Silver Whistle	
1951	Billy Budd	
1961	Take Her, She's Mine	
1963	Andorra	
1963	Barefoot in the Park	
1967	The Ninety Day Mistress	
1968	Staircase	
1968	Loot	
1968	Hair	
1976	Knock Knock	
1976	The Robber Bridegroom	
1977	Hair	
1978	The Effect of Gamma Rays on Man-in-the-Moon Marigolds	
1980	Nuts	
1980	The American Clock	
1981	A Talent for Murder	
1982	Deathtrap	
1982	Whodunnit	
1983	Doonesbury	

=== 2000s to present ===
Notable productions at the theater
Opening year	Name	Refs.
2003	The Violet Hour	
2004	Sight Unseen	
2004	Reckless	
2005	Brooklyn Boy	
2005	After the Night and the Music	
2005	Absurd Person Singular	
2006	Rabbit Hole	
2006	Shining City	
2007	Translations	
2007	LoveMusik	
2007	Mauritius	
2008	Come Back, Little Sheba	
2008	Top Girls	
2008	To Be or Not To Be	
2009	The American Plan	
2009	Accent on Youth	
2009	The Royal Family	
2010	Time Stands Still	
2010	Collected Stories	
2010	The Pitmen Painters	
2011	Good People	
2011	Master Class	
2011	Venus in Fur	
2012	Wit	
2012	The Columnist	
2012	An Enemy of the People	
2013	The Other Place	
2013	The Assembled Parties	
2013	The Snow Geese	
2014	Outside Mullingar	
2014	Casa Valentina	
2014	The Country House	
2015	Constellations	
2015	Airline Highway	
2015	Fool for Love	
2016	Our Mother's Brief Affair	
2016	The Father	
2016	Heisenberg	
2017	Jitney	
2017	The Little Foxes	
2017	Prince of Broadway	
2017	The Children	
2018	Saint Joan	
2018	The Nap	
2019	Choir Boy	
2019	Ink	
2019	The Height of the Storm	
2020	My Name Is Lucy Barton	
2021	Lackawanna Blues	
2022	Skeleton Crew	
2022	How I Learned to Drive	
2022	Cost of Living	
2022	The Collaboration	
2023	Summer, 1976	
2023	Jaja's African Hair Braiding	
2024	Prayer for the French Republic	
2024	Mary Jane	
2024	Eureka Day	
2025	Stephen Sondheim's Old Friends	
2025	Punch	
2026	Bug	
2026	The Balusters	
2026	School Girls; Or, the African Mean Girls Play	
2027	Awake and Sing!	
2027	Montauk	

== See also ==
- List of Broadway theatres
- List of New York City Designated Landmarks in Manhattan from 14th to 59th Streets
- National Register of Historic Places listings in Manhattan from 14th to 59th Streets
