= Sex (play) =

1926 play by Mae West

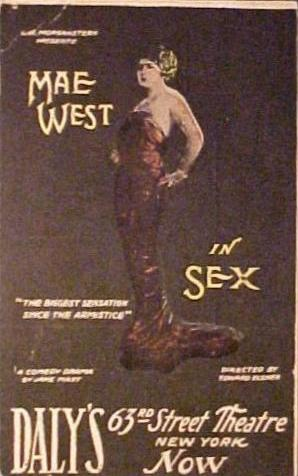
- Promotional windowcard
- Written by: Mae West
- Setting: New York City; Montreal; Port-au-Prince

Premiere
- Date: April 26, 1926
- Place: Daly's 63rd Street Theatre

Sex is a 1926 play written by and starring Mae West, who used the pen name "Jane Mast". Staged on Broadway, the play received bad reviews, but was a commercial success. It was eventually shut down by the New York City Police Department due to obscenity, and West was sentenced to 10 days in jail because of it.

== Plot ==
=== Act One ===
The play opens at Rocky's residence on Caidoux Street in Montreal's red-light district. Rocky receives an unwanted visit from Dawson, a police officer he has been paying off to keep quiet about a murder. Rocky offers Margy, a prostitute who works for him, as payment to Dawson, but she refuses. Dawson leaves without trouble, but swears to return for his money. Margy longs to leave Rocky for a better life, but she currently has no realistic alternative. Rocky leaves for a date with a "society dame", whom he plans to seduce and blackmail. Once Rocky has left, Margy receives several visitors. The first is her best friend Agnes, who, despite Margy's warnings about rejection, plans to return home to her parents once she's saved enough money. Margy's second visitor is Gregg, a Royal Navy officer who is both a customer and a friend. Gregg encourages Margy to follow the fleet around and entertain the military men so she can see the world and get rich. To prove he truly cares about her, he takes her out on a nice date with the money he planned on using for her services. Rocky returns with his "society dame" Clara, whom he quickly drugs and hauls into the bedroom once she is unconscious.

Margy and Gregg return to have a drink and discover that Rocky has fled and left behind Clara, who is now near death. Gregg and Margy manage to revive her, and she regains consciousness as Dawson returns. Margy tries to cover up for Rocky and Clara by saying Clara is a friend, but Clara takes advantage of Margy and lies to Dawson, saying Margy lured her in and stole all her jewelry. Dawson prepares to take Clara downtown for further investigation but Clara, knowing the publicity would ruin her reputation, convinces Dawson to accept money in exchange for letting her go. As he goes to escort Clara out of Montreal, Margy stops them and curses Clara for trying to frame her to save herself. Margy reminds Clara that all she ever did to her was try to save her life, and if she ever gets the chance to get even with her, she would take it.

=== Act Two ===
The second act opens at The Café Port-au-Prince in Haiti. Margy has begun to follow the fleet and travel the world as Gregg suggested. Gregg and Margy run into Jones, an old customer of Margy's. He keeps trying to seduce Margy, but Gregg is strangely protective and warns him to back off. The captain of the ship introduces Margy to Jimmy, a young millionaire. Jimmy is unaware Margy is a prostitute and quickly falls in love. Jimmy soon proposes to Margy and begs her to return home with him. She tells him he is silly, as they have not even known each other for more than a week. Jimmy insists and eventually Margy says yes to his proposal. After too much wine, Jimmy soon retires to his room.

Margy discovers Agnes in a state of despair and learns that Agnes's family rejected her when she tried to return home. Margy consoles her and confides that she is pretending to be an upper-class tourist so that she can marry a rich man. Agnes is delighted, but Margy is considering coming clean because she does not want to lie to such a good man. Agnes makes Margy promise she will marry Jimmy and have a good life. Margy tries to get Agnes a hotel room and some new clothes, but Agnes does not want to ruin Margy's cover, so she refuses and runs off sobbing. Gregg enters and tells Margy he is leaving the next day for Australia, then asks if she will come with him and be his wife. Margy is flattered, but turns him down. Jimmy re-enters and a commotion is heard. Agnes has jumped off the boat into the bay and drowned herself. Margy nearly faints, and Jimmy, surprised at her reaction, tells her not to worry because it is just some worthless prostitute.

=== Act Three ===
Act Three opens at Jimmy Stanton's home, where Jimmy is excited for Margy to meet his parents. Upon meeting Jimmy's mother, Clara, Margy instantly recognizes her as the "society dame" from Montreal. Clara cannot reveal who Margy is without exposing herself, and Margy takes advantage of the situation to put Clara in her place. Once alone with Jimmy, Margy brings him up to her room to seduce him before their wedding as a way of getting revenge on Clara. The next morning, Jimmy tells Margy that he is having his friend Lieutenant Gregg over. Gregg also recognizes Clara from Montreal, but Margy stops him before he has the chance to say anything. Clara is so anxious about her past being exposed she feigns illness and rushes off to her room. Once Jimmy and Gregg have left, there is a knock at the door, and Clara answers it to reveal Rocky, who demands money. Clara grabs for a gun, but Margy enters and takes the gun while calling the police. Margy knows that Rocky has been blackmailing Clara, but she lets him run before the police arrive when he promises to leave them alone forever.

When the police arrive, Margy tells them it was a mistake, but to her dismay, she recognizes one of the officers as one of her former clients, and he recognizes her as well. Knowing she can never pull off her façade, she silently goes up to her room. Jimmy and Gregg return and begin to talk with Clara, but Margy interrupts, dressed to leave and carrying her suitcase. She explains to Jimmy that she is the same as the woman who threw herself into the bay in Haiti. Jimmy is heartbroken that Margy is not what she appeared to be, and he cannot love her for who she is. Margy, who is not surprised, smiles and says she's leaving for Australia. She takes Gregg's hand, knowing that he has loved her all along.

== List of characters ==
- Margy LaMont – a prostitute
- Rocky Waldron – a pimp
- Manly – a thug
- Curley – a pimp
- Dawson – a corrupt officer of the law
- Agnes – a prostitute and best friend of Margy LaMont
- Red – a prostitute
- Flossie – a prostitute
- Jones – a client
- Lieutenant Gregg – an English naval officer
- Captain Carter – an officer
- Condez – host of the Café Port-au-Prince
- Clara Stanton – a wealthy woman
- Jimmy Stanton – son of Clara Stanton
- Robert Stanton – husband of Clara Stanton and father of Jimmy Stanton
- Marie – the Stantons' French maid
- Jenkins – the Stantons' butler
- Policeman
- First Man
- Second Man
- Waiter

== Production history ==
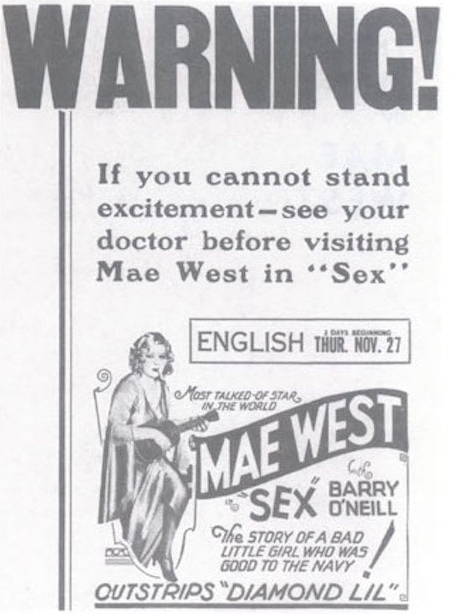
1926 Show Poster advertising Mae West's play Sex

The comedy-drama premiered April 26, 1926, at Daly's 63rd Street Theatre in New York City. Sex received many scathing reviews from a variety of critics because of the play's moral implications. The New York Times considered it to be a "crude and inept play, cheaply produced and poorly acted" while Billboard condemned it as "the cheapest most vulgar low show to have dared to open in New York this year". When the show opened, Broadway had been in a commercial slump, yet in spite of this and negative press, Sex played to full audiences. Sex was the only play on Broadway that season to stay open through the summer and into the following year.

There were 375 performances before the New York Police Department raided West and her company in February 1927. They were charged with obscenity, after 325,000 people had watched it, including members of the police department and their wives, judges of the criminal courts, and seven members of the district attorney's staff. West was sentenced to 10 days in a workhouse on Roosevelt Island (known then as "Welfare Island") and fined $500. The resulting publicity increased her national renown.

The original production of Sex was directed by Edward Elsner, produced by C. William Morganstern, and stage managed by Alfred L. Rigali. The original cast featured Mae West as Margy LaMont, Al Re Alia as Curley, Conde Brewer as Condez, Gordon Earle as Waiter, D. J. Hamilton as Jones, Frank Howard as Jenkins, Michael Markham as Spanish Dancer, Constance Morganstern as Marie, Mary Morrisey as Red, Barry O'Neill as Lieutenant Gregg, Ann Reader as Agnes Scott, Pacie Ripple as Robert Stanton, George Rogers as Captain Carter, Warren Sterling as Rocky Waldron, Eda Von Buelow as Clara Smith, and Lyons Wickland as Jimmy Stanton.

The show didn't receive another significant production until the Canadian premiere of Sex was produced by the Shaw Festival for its 2019 season. The show was directed by Canadian director Peter Hinton-Davis and designed by Eo Sharpe.

== Prosecution ==
West and the entire cast were arrested on morals charges. West was sentenced to ten days, and served eight days with two days off for "good behavior". Media attention surrounding the incident enhanced her career, by crowning her the darling "bad girl" who "had climbed the ladder of success wrong by wrong".

== See also ==
- The Drag (play)
- Pleasure Man
