= Daly's 63rd Street Theatre =

Former theatre in Manhattan, New York

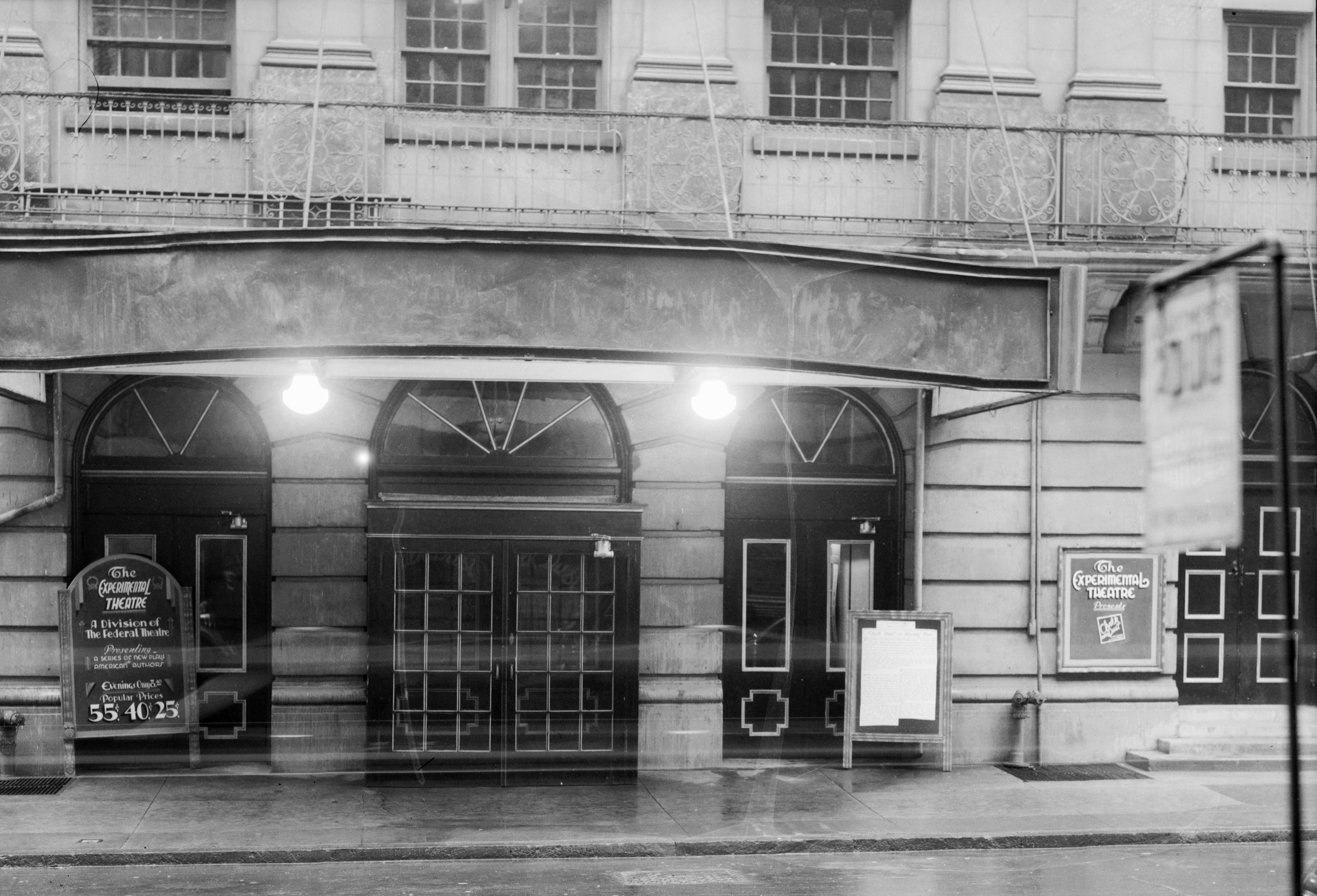
- Exterior of the Experimental Theatre, a Federal Theatre Project venue, in 1936
- Former names: 63rd Street Music Hall (1914–1921) Cort's 63rd Street Theatre (1921); 63rd Street Music Hall (1921); Daly's 63rd Street Theatre (1922–1928); Coburn Theatre (1928–1929); Recital Theatre (1932); Park Lane Theatre (1932); Gilmore's 63rd Street Theatre (1934); Experimental Theatre (1936–1938) Daly’s 63rd Street Theatre (1938–1941)
- Address: 22 West 63rd Street; New York City; United States
- Capacity: 1,024
- Production: Shuffle Along

Construction
- Opened: 1914
- Closed: 1941
- Demolished: 1957
- Years active: 1921–1941
- Architects: Thomas W. Lamb, Erwin Rossbach

Daly's 63rd Street Theatre was a Broadway theatre, which was active from 1921 to 1941. It was built in 1914 as the 63rd Street Music Hall and had several other names between 1921 and 1938. The building was demolished in 1957.

== History ==
The building which subsequently housed the theater was originally designed by architect Thomas W. Lamb for the Davenport stock company. Construction began in 1909, but financial issues stalled it soon after. Later on, architect Erwin Rossbach was hired by the Association of Bible Students to complete the structure. The organization intended it to serve for religious lectures and screening Biblical films. It was completed in 1914, and named the 63rd Street Music Hall. From 1919, the theatre served as a children's cinema.

On January 31, 1921, Cort 63rd Street Theatre was opened in the building. In 1922, the theater was renamed Daly's 63rd Street Theatre, in honor of Augustin Daly. The theater's name was changed on several occasions: it became the Coburn Theatre in 1928 and was renamed Recital Theatre in 1932, only to become the Park Lane Theatre several months later. From 1934 to 1936 it was known as Gilmore's 63rd Street Theatre, and afterwards as the Experimental Theatre. From 1938 until its closure in 1941, it returned to be Daly's 63rd Street Theatre. The building was demolished in 1957.

The first production in the theater in 1921 was the premiere of Shuffle Along, the hit musical revue by Flournoy Miller, Aubrey Lyles, Noble Sissle, and Eubie Blake. Other notable premieres at the theatre were Mae West's Sex in February 1926 and the English-language version of Friedrich Wolf's Professor Mamlock in 1937.

== Selected productions ==
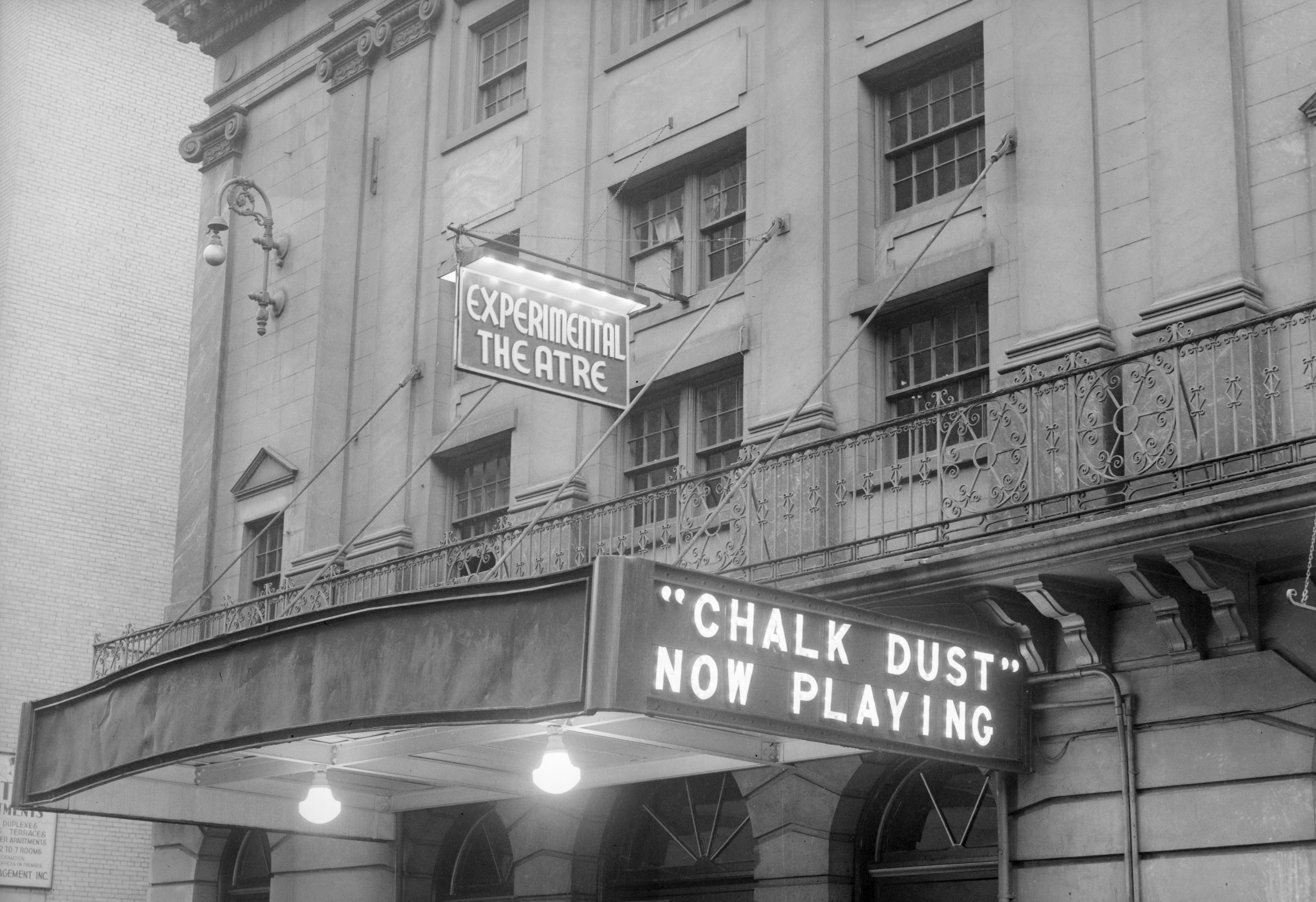
Marquee of the Experimental Theatre, March–April 1936

- Shuffle Along (1921)
- Liza (1922)
- Desire Under the Elms (1925)
- Sex (1926)
- Africana (1926)
- Keep Shufflin' (1928)
- Lady Windermere's Fan (1932)
- Awake and Sing! (1938)
- The Miser (1936)
- Professor Mamlock (1937)
