= Elvis Christmas =

Compilation album by Elvis Presley
- Released: October 10, 2006
- Recorded: January 12, 1957 – May 16, 1971
- Genre: Rockabilly, rock and roll, gospel, blues, country
- Label: Sony BMG/RCA

Elvis Presley chronology
Hitstory (2005)	Elvis Christmas (2006)	The Essential Elvis Presley (2007)

Elvis Christmas is a CD collection featuring all of the tracks from Elvis Presley's RCA Victor LPs, Elvis' Christmas Album (issued in 1957) and Elvis Sings the Wonderful World of Christmas (issued in 1971). The RIAA awarded it a Gold Record on 15 September 2011.

== Track listing ==
1. "Santa Claus Is Back in Town"
2. "White Christmas"
3. "Here Comes Santa Claus (Right Down Santa Claus Lane)"
4. "I'll Be Home for Christmas"
5. "Blue Christmas"
6. "Santa Bring My Baby Back (To Me)"
7. "O Little Town of Bethlehem"
8. "Silent Night"
9. "(There'll Be) Peace in the Valley (For Me)"
10. "I Believe"
11. "Take My Hand, Precious Lord"
12. "It's No Secret (What God Can Do)"
13. "O Come, All Ye Faithful"
14. "The First Noel"
15. "On A Snowy Christmas Night"
16. "Winter Wonderland"
17. "The Wonderful World of Christmas"
18. "It Won't Seem Like Christmas (Without You)"
19. "I'll Be Home on Christmas Day"
20. "If I Get Home on Christmas Day"
21. "Holly Leaves and Christmas Trees"
22. "Merry Christmas Baby"
23. "Silver Bells"

== Chart performance ==
Chart (2006)	Peak position
U.S. Billboard Top Country Albums	14
U.S. Billboard 200	68
