= List of Billboard number-one albums of 1958 =

These are the Billboard magazine number-one albums of 1958, per the Billboard chart Best-Selling Pop LPs.

== Chart history ==
Key
†	Indicates best performing album of 1958

Issue date	Album	Artist(s)	Label	Ref.
January 6	Merry Christmas	Bing Crosby	Decca	
January 13	Elvis' Christmas Album	Elvis Presley	RCA Victor	
January 20	Ricky	Ricky Nelson	Imperial	
January 27	Ricky	Ricky Nelson	Imperial	
February 3	My Fair Lady †	Original Broadway Cast	Columbia	
February 10	Come Fly with Me	Frank Sinatra	Capitol	
February 17	Come Fly with Me	Frank Sinatra	Capitol	
February 24	Come Fly with Me	Frank Sinatra	Capitol	
March 3	Come Fly with Me	Frank Sinatra	Capitol	
March 10	Come Fly with Me	Frank Sinatra	Capitol	
March 17	The Music Man	Original Cast	Capitol	
March 24	The Music Man	Original Cast	Capitol	
March 31	The Music Man	Original Cast	Capitol	
April 7	My Fair Lady †	Original Broadway Cast	Columbia	
April 14	My Fair Lady †	Original Broadway Cast	Columbia	
April 21	The Music Man	Original Cast	Capitol	
April 28	The Music Man	Original Cast	Capitol	
May 5	The Music Man	Original Cast	Capitol	
May 12	The Music Man	Original Cast	Capitol	
May 19	South Pacific	Soundtrack	RCA Victor	
May 26	The Music Man	Original Cast	Capitol	
June 2	The Music Man	Original Cast	Capitol	
June 9	Johnny's Greatest Hits	Johnny Mathis	Columbia	
June 16	Johnny's Greatest Hits	Johnny Mathis	Columbia	
June 23	The Music Man	Original Cast	Capitol	
June 30	The Music Man	Original Cast	Capitol	
July 7	Johnny's Greatest Hits	Johnny Mathis	Columbia	
July 14	The Music Man	Original Cast	Capitol	
July 21	Gigi	Soundtrack	MGM	
July 28	Gigi	Soundtrack	MGM	
August 4	Gigi	Soundtrack	MGM	
August 11	Tchaikovsky Piano Concerto No. 1	Van Cliburn	RCA Victor	
August 18	Tchaikovsky Piano Concerto No. 1	Van Cliburn	RCA Victor	
August 25	Tchaikovsky Piano Concerto No. 1	Van Cliburn	RCA Victor	
September 1	Tchaikovsky Piano Concerto No. 1	Van Cliburn	RCA Victor	
September 8	Tchaikovsky Piano Concerto No. 1	Van Cliburn	RCA Victor	
September 15	South Pacific	Soundtrack	RCA Victor	
September 22	Tchaikovsky Piano Concerto No. 1	Van Cliburn	RCA Victor	
September 29	Tchaikovsky Piano Concerto No. 1	Van Cliburn	RCA Victor	
October 6	Sing Along with Mitch	Mitch Miller	Columbia	
October 13	Frank Sinatra Sings for Only the Lonely	Frank Sinatra	Capitol	
October 20	Frank Sinatra Sings for Only the Lonely	Frank Sinatra	Capitol	
October 27	Frank Sinatra Sings for Only the Lonely	Frank Sinatra	Capitol	
November 3	Frank Sinatra Sings for Only the Lonely	Frank Sinatra	Capitol	
November 10	Frank Sinatra Sings for Only the Lonely	Frank Sinatra	Capitol	
November 17	South Pacific	Soundtrack	RCA Victor	
November 24	The Kingston Trio	The Kingston Trio	Capitol	
December 1	Sing Along with Mitch	Mitch Miller	Columbia	
December 8	Sing Along with Mitch	Mitch Miller	Columbia	
December 15	Sing Along with Mitch	Mitch Miller	Columbia	
December 22	Sing Along with Mitch	Mitch Miller	Columbia	
December 29	Sing Along with Mitch	Mitch Miller	Columbia	

== See also ==
- 1958 in music
- List of number-one albums (United States)
