= List of Billboard number-one albums of 1957 =

These are the Billboard magazine number-one albums of 1957. These number-one albums are from the chart Best-Selling Pop Albums. On October 7, 1957, the name of the chart was changed to Best-Selling Pop LPs.

== Chart history ==
Key
†	Indicates best performing album of 1957

Issue date	Album	Artist(s)	Label	Ref.
January 5	Elvis	Elvis Presley	RCA Victor	
January 12	Calypso	Harry Belafonte	RCA Victor	
January 19	Calypso	Harry Belafonte	RCA Victor	
January 26	Calypso	Harry Belafonte	RCA Victor	
February 2	Calypso	Harry Belafonte	RCA Victor	
February 9	Calypso	Harry Belafonte	RCA Victor	
February 16	Calypso	Harry Belafonte	RCA Victor	
February 23	Calypso	Harry Belafonte	RCA Victor	
March 2	Calypso	Harry Belafonte	RCA Victor	
March 9	Calypso	Harry Belafonte	RCA Victor	
March 16	Calypso	Harry Belafonte	RCA Victor	
March 23	Calypso	Harry Belafonte	RCA Victor	
March 30	Calypso	Harry Belafonte	RCA Victor	
April 6	Calypso	Harry Belafonte	RCA Victor	
April 13	Calypso	Harry Belafonte	RCA Victor	
April 20	Calypso	Harry Belafonte	RCA Victor	
April 27	Calypso	Harry Belafonte	RCA Victor	
April 29	Calypso	Harry Belafonte	RCA Victor	
May 6	Calypso	Harry Belafonte	RCA Victor	
May 13	Calypso	Harry Belafonte	RCA Victor	
May 20	Calypso	Harry Belafonte	RCA Victor	
May 27	Love Is the Thing	Nat King Cole	Capitol	
June 3	Love Is the Thing	Nat King Cole	Capitol	
June 10	Love Is the Thing	Nat King Cole	Capitol	
June 17	Love Is the Thing	Nat King Cole	Capitol	
June 24	Love Is the Thing	Nat King Cole	Capitol	
July 1	Love Is the Thing	Nat King Cole	Capitol	
July 8	Love Is the Thing	Nat King Cole	Capitol	
July 15	Love Is the Thing	Nat King Cole	Capitol	
July 22	Around the World in 80 Days	Soundtrack	Decca	
July 29	Loving You	Elvis Presley / Soundtrack	RCA Victor	
August 5	Loving You	Elvis Presley / Soundtrack	RCA Victor	
August 12	Loving You	Elvis Presley / Soundtrack	RCA Victor	
August 19	Loving You	Elvis Presley / Soundtrack	RCA Victor	
August 26	Loving You	Elvis Presley / Soundtrack	RCA Victor	
September 2	Loving You	Elvis Presley / Soundtrack	RCA Victor	
September 9	Loving You	Elvis Presley / Soundtrack	RCA Victor	
September 16	Loving You	Elvis Presley / Soundtrack	RCA Victor	
September 23	Loving You	Elvis Presley / Soundtrack	RCA Victor	
September 30	Loving You	Elvis Presley / Soundtrack	RCA Victor	
October 7	Around the World in 80 Days	Soundtrack	Decca	
October 14	Around the World in 80 Days	Soundtrack	Decca	
October 21	Around the World in 80 Days	Soundtrack	Decca	
October 28	Around the World in 80 Days	Soundtrack	Decca	
November 4	Around the World in 80 Days	Soundtrack	Decca	
November 11	Around the World in 80 Days	Soundtrack	Decca	
November 18	My Fair Lady †	Original Broadway Cast	Columbia	
November 25	Around the World in 80 Days	Soundtrack	Decca	
December 2	Around the World in 80 Days	Soundtrack	Decca	
December 9	Around the World in 80 Days	Soundtrack	Decca	
December 16	Elvis' Christmas Album	Elvis Presley	RCA Victor	
December 23	Elvis' Christmas Album	Elvis Presley	RCA Victor	
December 30	Elvis' Christmas Album	Elvis Presley	RCA Victor	

== See also ==
- 1957 in music
- List of number-one albums (United States)
