= Elvis' Christmas Album =

Studio album by Elvis Presley
- Released: October 15, 1957
- Recorded: January 12–13 and 19, 1957; September 5–7, 1957
- Studios: Radio Recorders, Hollywood
- Genres: Christmas; pop; gospel; rock and roll; country
- Length: 30:09
- Label: RCA Victor
- Producer: Steve Sholes

Elvis Presley chronology
Loving You (1957)	Elvis' Christmas Album (1957)	Jailhouse Rock (1957)

Singles from Elvis' Christmas Album
- 1. "Santa Bring My Baby Back (To Me)" Released: November 11, 1957; 2. "Blue Christmas" Released: November 3, 1964; 3. "Santa Claus Is Back in Town" Released: November 1965

Professional ratings
Review scores
Source	Rating
AllMusic	4.5/5 stars
MusicHound	4.5/5 stars
The Rolling Stone Album Guide	5/5 stars
Rough Guides	5/5 stars

Elvis' Christmas Album (also reissued as It's Christmas Time) is the first Christmas album and third studio album by American singer and musician Elvis Presley on RCA Victor, LOC -1035, a deluxe limited edition, released October 15, 1957, and recorded at Radio Recorders in Hollywood. It has been reissued in numerous different formats since its first release. It spent four weeks at No. 1 on the Billboard Top Pop Albums chart, and was the first of two Christmas-themed albums Presley would record, the other being Elvis Sings the Wonderful World of Christmas, released in 1971. The publication Music Vendor listed Elvis' Christmas Album on their singles charts for two weeks in December 1957 – January 1958, with a peak position of No. 49.

According to the Recording Industry Association of America (RIAA), Elvis' Christmas Album along with its reissues has shipped at least 17 million copies in the United States. It is the first Presley title to attain Diamond certification by the RIAA, and is also the best-selling Christmas album of all time in the United States. With total sales of more than 20 million copies worldwide, it remains the world's best-selling Christmas album and one of the best-selling albums of all time.

== Content ==
The original 1957 LP consisted of six popular Christmas songs, two traditional Christmas carols and four gospel songs which had been previously released on the EP Peace in the Valley, catalogue EPA 4054, issued March 1957, peaking at No. 3 on the Pop albums chart and at No. 39 on the singles chart. The two album sides are divided into a program of secular Christmas songs on side one, with two traditional Christmas carols and the gospel numbers on side two. These included two spirituals by innovator Thomas A. Dorsey, "Peace in the Valley" and "Take My Hand, Precious Lord". Coincidentally, A Jolly Christmas from Frank Sinatra, released the previous month, was also divided into secular and traditional sides.

While most of the songs selected were traditional Christmas fare, such as "White Christmas" and "Silent Night", two new songs by regular suppliers of material for Presley were commissioned. One was "Santa Bring My Baby Back (to Me)," and the other (selected by Presley to open the album) was a blues-based rock and roll number, "Santa Claus Is Back in Town", written by Jerry Leiber and Mike Stoller. This writer/producer team was responsible for some of the 1950s rhythm and blues and rock and roll's satire in their work with the Coasters, as well as penning "Hound Dog" for Willie Mae Thornton and providing Presley with some of his biggest hits, including "Jailhouse Rock" and "Don't".

Presley asked the pair to come up with another Christmas song during sessions for the album; within a few minutes, they had the song written and ready for recording. Originally titled "Christmas Blues", this slyly risqué number is given a full-throated treatment by Presley who, aided by the gritty ensemble playing from his band, was determined to ensure that this Christmas album would not be easily ignored. Much of the remaining program was performed in a more traditional manner appropriate to the solemnity of Christmas, although Presley's innate sense of occasion shone through on his left-of-center reading of Ernest Tubb's 1949 hit, "Blue Christmas".

"Silent Night" and "O Little Town of Bethlehem" were arranged by Presley himself.

The Bing Crosby holiday perennial "White Christmas", which appeared every year on the Billboard charts from 1942 to 1962, became the center of controversy upon the album's release, with calls by the song's composer Irving Berlin to have the song, and the entire album, banned from radio airplay. After hearing Presley's version of his song, which Berlin saw as a "profane parody of his cherished yuletide standard", he ordered his staff in New York to telephone radio stations across the United States, demanding the song be discontinued from radio play. While most US radio stations ignored Berlin's request, at least one disc jockey was fired for playing a song from the album, and most Canadian radio stations refused to play the album.

Ironically, the controversy was fueled by Presley's performance of the song in a style mirroring the version by Clyde McPhatter's group, The Drifters, which had been a Top 10 hit on the R&B singles chart in 1954 and 1955. Unlike Presley's recording, however, their version attracted virtually no adverse reaction, and certainly no reported opposition from Berlin. Part of the reason that The Drifters' version of "White Christmas" was less controversial was that this version was played only on black radio stations. Presley's version brought greater attention to The Drifters' version which gained prominence with its inclusion in the 1990 movie Home Alone.

== Packaging ==
Original 1957 copies of Elvis' Christmas Album (LOC-1035) were issued with a red gatefold album cover with attached booklet (as shown above) featuring promotional photos from Presley's third movie Jailhouse Rock. Even rarer than the cover and record itself is a gold foil price tag-shaped "gift giving" sticker attached to the shrink wrap, reading "TO __________, FROM _____________, ELVIS SINGS", followed by a list of the tracks. Original copies with the gold sticker intact on the shrink wrap have proven to be among the most valuable of Presley's albums. Adding to its already high value are limited red vinyl albums and album covers with gold print down the spine.

Record labels for all original 1957 pressings are black with all-silver print, the famous RCA Victor "His Master's Voice" dog and Gramophone trademark at the top of the label, and "LONG 33 1/3 PLAY" at the bottom.

== 45 RPM releases ==
The other new composition on the album, "Santa, Bring My Baby Back to Me" was paired with "Santa Claus Is Back in Town", and issued as the UK single concurrently with the album's release. The single reached number seven on the UK Singles Chart in November 1957.

No singles were issued in the US until 1964, when "Blue Christmas" was paired with "Wooden Heart", and reached No. 1 on the Billboard Christmas Singles chart; however, a pairing of "Blue Christmas" b/w "White Christmas" became a Top 20 UK hit in late 1964. "Santa Claus Is Back In Town"/"Blue Christmas" was a 1965 single release for the US market, and reached No. 4 on the Billboard Christmas Singles chart. "Blue Christmas" would re-enter the Christmas or Holiday Singles chart several times in the years that followed.

Two different EPs, Elvis Sings Christmas Songs, EPA 4108 in December 1957, and Christmas with Elvis, EPA 4340 in December 1958, divided the eight Christmas numbers between them. The former topped the newly established Billboard EP Chart, while the latter failed to chart.

== Reissues ==
=== First reissue on RCA Victor ===
Elvis' Christmas Album was reissued two years after its first release in October, 1959. The deluxe gatefold cover was replaced with a regular cover with a close-up of Elvis posed against an outdoor, snowy backdrop. The catalog number was changed to LPM-1951; the contents were unchanged from the original 1957 issue. The album continued to reach the album charts each year until 1962, eventually selling more than three million copies in the U.S.

=== Second reissue on RCA Camden ===
In 1971, Elvis recorded a new Christmas album, Elvis Sings the Wonderful World of Christmas; The original Elvis' Christmas Album went out of print, but continued interest in the album prompted RCA to reissue a revised and truncated version on its budget label RCA Camden in November 1970. This reissue replaced the four gospel tracks from the Peace in the Valley EP with the 1966 holiday single "If Every Day Was Like Christmas", along with the 1970 non-seasonal B-side "Mama Liked the Roses", issued as the flip to Elvis's top ten single "The Wonder of You" and originating from Presley's acclaimed 1969 Memphis sessions; neither track had been available on LP format previously. With ten tracks and a shorter running time, it fit the standard for RCA's budget Camden label issues at the time. The religious and secular Christmas songs were also mixed. The initial cover of this revised version echoed that of the 1958 reissue, except a more recent photograph with Elvis wearing a blue racing jacket with two white stripes on the left was used from the set of the 1967 movie Speedway. The album was also released in the UK with an album cover that featured Elvis's face from the 1970 Camden release in a circle in the middle surrounded in white with the title and the song selections in red. The four Peace in the Valley tracks were reissued the next year on the RCA Camden compilation You'll Never Walk Alone.

=== Third reissue on Pickwick ===
During the mid-1970s, RCA Records leased the rights to some of its recordings on the Camden label to Pickwick Records, a budget reissue label. Pickwick reissued the 10-track RCA Camden Christmas album in 1975 with yet another cover design, Elvis's photo from the Camden album cover, cropped and surrounded by red ribbons with holly underneath and a dark blue background. Following Presley's unexpected death in August 1977, the Pickwick Christmas album reissue was advertised and sold on television by mail order to enormous sales, later certified by the RIAA as selling in excess of ten million copies. After Presley's death, demand for his recordings was so high, stores could not keep them in stock. RCA eventually reclaimed the reissue rights to its Camden titles from Pickwick. Elvis' Christmas Album with its Pickwick cover art was reissued in 1986 by RCA on LP (Some pressings are on the RCA Special Products label, others on the RCA Camden label) and cassette and on compact disc in Canada in the RCA Camden Classics series. This RCA CD reissue remained in print until 1995 when the album was reissued with new cover art and the title shortened to Elvis Christmas. The catalog number (CAD1-2428) was unchanged from the previous CD issue and the track listing remained the same as the original 1970 RCA Camden LP release. In 2006, RCA released another CD compilation with the title Elvis Christmas; this collection combined the tracks from the original 1957 Christmas Album and Elvis Sings the Wonderful World of Christmas, from 1971.

=== Other reissues ===
In 1976, another Elvis Christmas collection was released in Canada on LP and cassette under the title Blue Christmas; this reissue used the cover photo from the 1957 Christmas album and also had an alternate track listing, including tracks from Elvis Sings the Wonderful World of Christmas from 1971. In 1985, as part of the RCA Records Elvis 50th Anniversary series, the original 1957 version of Elvis' Christmas Album was reissued on green vinyl with a recreation of its original cover art, gatefold sleeve and picture booklet; the album was also available on CD and cassette. In 1995, RCA/BMG Special Products again reissued the Camden/Pickwick compilation on CD retitled It's Christmas Time, with new cover art. By the second decade of the 21st Century, It's Christmas Time had become the second biggest-selling album in the Special Products series, earning a 4× Platinum certification on March 8, 2018. In 2016, the original 1957 version of Elvis' Christmas Album was included in the 60 CD boxed set containing all of Presley's original RCA Victor albums, Elvis Presley – The RCA Album Collection

In October 2023, as a result of the increasing popularity of vinyl records, RCA Records reissued Elvis' Christmas Album and the 1971 Elvis Sings the Wonderful World of Christmas on 150gm vinyl. Unlike other reissues of the original 1957 LP, this one comes in a single pocket sleeve, instead of the gatefold cover and no booklet. Walmart was granted permission to sell a limited green vinyl edition. Another inconstancy with this release was instead of the correct RCA Victor label with the dog and gramophone trademark and silver "RCA Victor" font, this reissue uses the round RCA "lightning bolt" logo with the mid-1960s "RCA Victor" font in bold white on the record labels.

In the January 5, 2019, issue of Billboard, It's Christmas Time appeared for the first time inside the top 40 albums of the Billboard 200 charts, placing at number 25.

All of the tracks originally issued on Elvis Christmas Album are also available on several other RCA compilations of Presley's Christmas recordings, including Christmas Peace from 2003 and Elvis Christmas (a different, expanded version of the 1995 issue) from 2006. All of the tracks are also available in the 1992 RCA boxed set The King of Rock 'n' Roll: The Complete 50's Masters. In late 2007, Speaker's Corner Records from Germany reissued the album on a high-quality heavy vinyl pressing; this reissue also featured a reproduction of the original gatefold album cover and RCA Victor label from 1957. In addition, in 2010, a DVD was released in a series from Sony Music called The Yule Log DVD, in which the music from Elvis' Christmas Album (but without "I'll Be Home for Christmas") is featured with three different holiday visuals (one of them the yule log of the series' title). The original LP cover is featured on the DVD menu.

== Track listing ==
Side one
No.	Title	Writer(s)	Recording date	Length
1.	"Santa Claus Is Back in Town"	Jerry Leiber; Mike Stoller	September 7, 1957	2:22
2.	"White Christmas"	Irving Berlin	September 6, 1957	2:23
3.	"Here Comes Santa Claus"	Gene Autry; Oakley Haldeman; Harriet Melka	September 6, 1957	1:54
4.	"I'll Be Home for Christmas"	Kim Gannon; Walter Kent; Buck Ram	September 7, 1957	1:53
5.	"Blue Christmas"	Billy Hayes; Jay W. Johnson	September 5, 1957	2:07
6.	"Santa Bring My Baby Back (To Me)"	Aaron Schroeder; Claude Demetrius	September 7, 1957	1:54

Side two
No.	Title	Writer(s)	Recording date	Length
1.	"O Little Town of Bethlehem"	Phillips Brooks; Lewis Redner; Elvis Presley^{[a]}	September 7, 1957	2:35
2.	"Silent Night"	Joseph Mohr; Franz Gruber; Presley^{[a]}	September 6, 1957	2:23
3.	"(There'll Be) Peace In The Valley (For Me)" (from Peace in the Valley, 1957)	Thomas A. Dorsey	January 13, 1957	3:22
4.	"I Believe" (from Peace in the Valley, 1957)	Ervin Drake; Irvin Graham; Jimmy Shirl; Al Stillman	January 12, 1957	2:05
5.	"Take My Hand, Precious Lord" (from Peace in the Valley, 1957)	Thomas A. Dorsey	January 13, 1957	3:16
6.	"It Is No Secret (What God Can Do)" (from Peace in the Valley, 1957)	Stuart Hamblen	January 19, 1957	3:53

=== Camden / Pickwick edition ===
Camden / Pickwick edition - side one
No.	Title	Writer(s)	Recording date	Length
1.	"Blue Christmas"	Hayes; Johnson	September 5, 1957	2:07
2.	"Silent Night"	Mohr; Gruber; Presley^{[a]}	September 6, 1957	2:23
3.	"White Christmas"	Berlin	September 6, 1957	2:23
4.	"Santa Claus Is Back in Town"	Leiber; Stoller	September 7, 1957	2:22
5.	"I'll Be Home for Christmas"	Gannon; Kent; Ram	September 7, 1957	1:53

Camden / Pickwick edition - side two
No.	Title	Writer(s)	Recording date	Length
1.	"If Every Day Was Like Christmas"	Red West	June 10, 1966 at RCA Studio B	2:42
2.	"Here Comes Santa Claus"	Autry; Haldeman	September 6, 1957	1:54
3.	"O Little Town of Bethlehem"	Brooks; Redner; Presley^{[a]}	September 7, 1957	2:35
4.	"Santa, Bring My Baby Back (to Me)"	Schroeder; Demetrius	September 7, 1957	1:54
5.	"Mama Liked the Roses"	Johnny Christopher	April 20, 1969 at American Studios	2:47

Notes

- ^{^a} signifies arranged by

== Personnel ==
Credits from Keith Flynn and Ernst Jorgensen's examination of session tapes and RCA and AFM paperwork.

The Blue Moon Boys

- Elvis Presley – lead vocals, acoustic rhythm guitar
- Scotty Moore – electric lead guitar
- Bill Black – bass
- D. J. Fontana – drums

The Jordanaires

- Gordon Stoker – backing vocals; piano on "Peace in the Valley", "I Believe", and "Take My Hand, Precious Lord"
- Hoyt Hawkins – backing vocals; organ on "It Is No Secret"
- Neal Matthews – backing vocals
- Hugh Jarrett – backing vocals

Additional personnel and production staff

- Dudley Brooks – piano (except "Peace in the Valley", "I Believe", and "Take My Hand, Precious Lord")
- Millie Kirkham – backing vocals (except "Peace in the Valley", "I Believe", "Take My Hand, Precious Lord", and "It Is No Secret")
- Steve Sholes – producer
- Thorne Nogar – engineer

NOTE: Credits for "If Every Day Was Like Christmas" and "Mama Liked the Roses", both of which were included on the 1970 Camden re-release (and variations of that album), can be found on their respective pages.

== Charts ==
=== Weekly charts ===
Weekly chart performance for Elvis' Christmas Album
Chart (1957–2025)	Peak position
Austrian Albums (Ö3 Austria)	41
Belgian Albums (Ultratop Wallonia)	167
Canadian Albums (Billboard)	34
Dutch Albums (Album Top 100)	9
Finnish Albums (Suomen virallinen lista)	15
German Albums (Offizielle Top 100)	43
Hungarian Albums (MAHASZ)	31
Icelandic Albums (Tónlistinn)	15
Italian Albums (FIMI)	77
Latvian Albums (LaIPA)	17
Lithuanian Albums (AGATA)	24
Norwegian Albums (VG-lista)	12
Polish Albums (ZPAV)	99
Portuguese Albums (AFP)	75
Swedish Albums (Sverigetopplistan)	12
Swiss Albums (Schweizer Hitparade)	14
US Best Selling Pop LPs (Billboard)	1

Weekly chart performance for It's Christmas Time
Chart (2009–2020)	Peak position
US Billboard 200	25
US Top Country Albums (Billboard)	2

=== Year-end charts ===
Year-end chart performance for It's Christmas Time
Chart (2018)	Position
US Top Country Albums (Billboard)	59
Chart (2019)	Position
US Top Country Albums (Billboard)	53
Chart (2020)	Position
US Top Country Albums (Billboard)	61

== Certifications ==
Certifications for Elvis' Christmas Album
Region	Certification	Certified units/sales
Canada (Music Canada)	Platinum	100,000^{^}
United States (RIAA)	3× Platinum	3,000,000^{^}
United States (RIAA) 1970 reissue	Diamond	10,000,000^{^}
United States (RIAA) 1999 "It's Christmas Time" reissue	4× Platinum	4,000,000^{^}
^{^} Shipments figures based on certification alone.

== See also ==
- List of best-selling albums
- List of Billboard number-one albums of 1957
- List of Billboard 200 number-one albums of 1958
