= Van Cliburn =

American pianist (1934–2013)

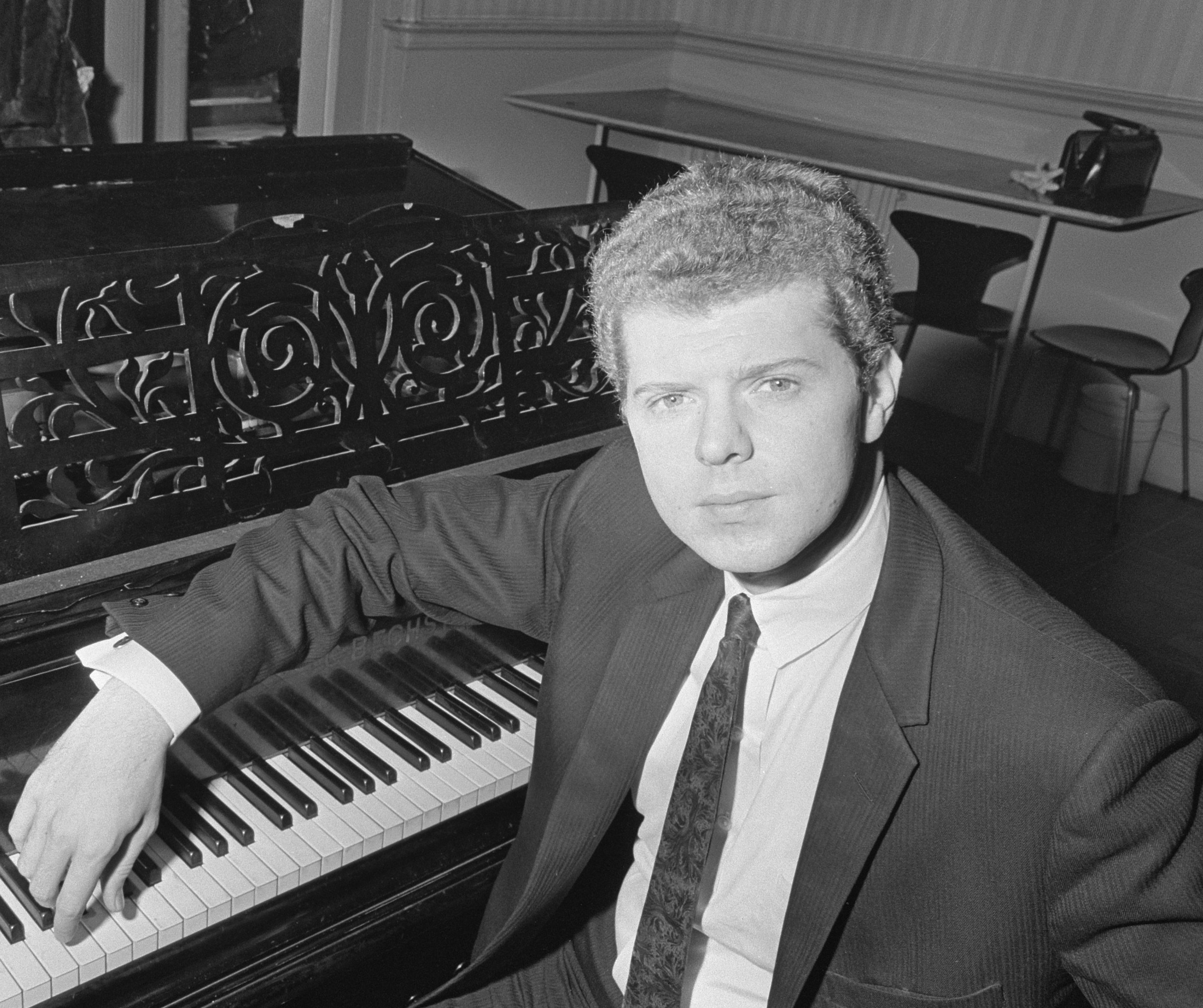
- Cliburn in 1966
- Born: Harvey Lavan Cliburn Jr. July 12, 1934; Shreveport, Louisiana, U.S.
- Died: February 27, 2013 (aged 78); Fort Worth, Texas, U.S.
- Occupation: Classical pianist

Harvey Lavan "Van" Cliburn Jr. (July 12, 1934 – February 27, 2013) was an American pianist. At the age of 23, Cliburn achieved worldwide recognition when in 1958 he won the inaugural International Tchaikovsky Competition in Moscow.

Cliburn's mother, a piano teacher and an accomplished pianist in her own right, discovered him playing at age three, mimicking one of her students, and arranged for him to start taking lessons. Cliburn developed a rich, round tone and a singing-voice-like phrasing, having been taught from the start to sing each piece. Cliburn toured domestically and overseas. He played for royalty, heads of state, and every US president from Harry S. Truman to Barack Obama.

== Early life ==
Harvey Lavan Cliburn Jr. was born in Shreveport, Louisiana, the son of Rildia Bee (née O'Bryan) and Harvey Lavan Cliburn Sr. When he was three, he began taking piano lessons from his mother, who had studied under Arthur Friedheim, a pupil of Franz Liszt. When Cliburn was six, his father, who worked in the oil industry, moved the family to Kilgore, Texas.

At 12, Cliburn won a statewide piano competition, which led to his debut with the Houston Symphony Orchestra. He graduated from Kilgore High School. He entered the Juilliard School in New York City at 17 and studied under Rosina Lhévinne, who trained him in the tradition of the great Russian romantics. In 1952, Cliburn won the Kosciuszko Foundation's Chopin Piano Competition in New York City. At 20, Cliburn won the Leventritt Award and made his debut at Carnegie Hall.

== Career ==
=== International competition in Moscow ===
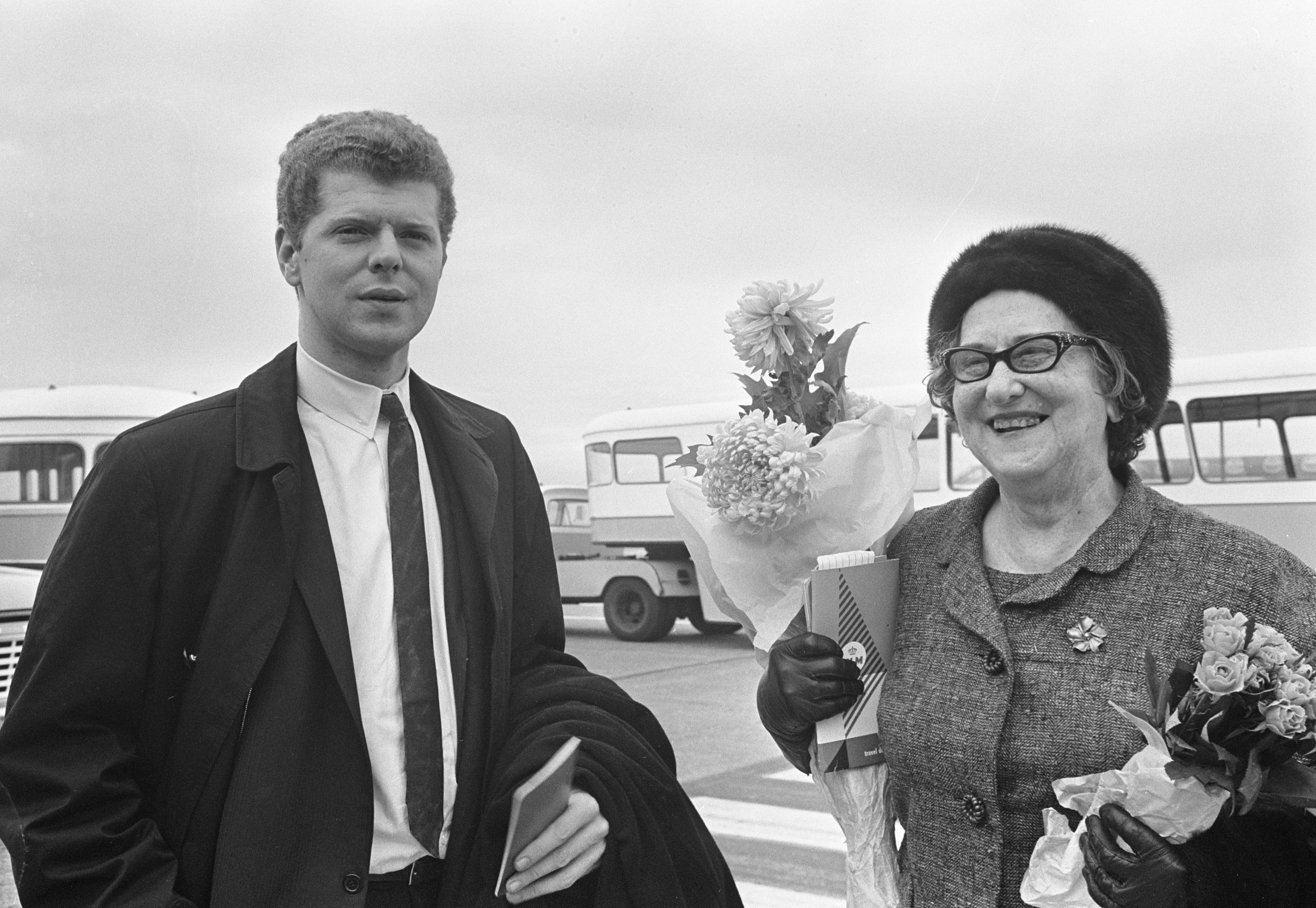
Cliburn with his mother in the Netherlands in 1966

The first International Tchaikovsky Competition in 1958 was an event designed to demonstrate Soviet cultural superiority during the Cold War after the USSR's technological victory with the Sputnik launch in October 1957, although the field of pianists in the first edition of the Tchaikovsky competition in 1958 was only of regional significance. Cliburn had already won the Leventritt Competition in 1954, the most prestigious piano competition of the era, and had performed the Tchaikovsky Piano Concerto with the New York Philharmonic Orchestra in the following season, but Cliburn wished to participate in the cultural exchanges with the Soviet Union which emerged following the death of Stalin in 1953. Cliburn's performance at the competition finale of Tchaikovsky's Piano Concerto No. 1 and Rachmaninoff's Piano Concerto No. 3 on April 13 earned him a standing ovation lasting eight minutes. After the ovation, Van Cliburn made a brief speech in Russian and then resumed his seat at the piano and began to play—to the surprise and delight of the Russian musicians visible behind him in the film made of his part in the competition—his own piano arrangement of the much-beloved song "Moscow Nights", which further endeared him to the Russians. When it was time to announce the winner, the judges felt obliged to ask permission of the Soviet leader Nikita Khrushchev to give the first prize to an American. "Is he the best?" Khrushchev asked. "Yes." "Then give him the prize!" Cliburn was to maintain a lasting relationship with the Soviet leader. Cliburn returned home to a ticker-tape parade in New York City, the only time the honor has been accorded a classical musician. He was hailed in the American media as the man who "beat the Russians at their own game" and restored the pride of America. Arriving at City Hall after the parade, Cliburn told the audience:

I appreciate more than you will ever know that you are honoring me, but the thing that thrills me the most is that you are honoring classical music. Because I'm only one of many. I'm only a witness and a messenger. Because I believe so much in the beauty, the construction, the architecture invisible, the importance for all generations, for young people to come that it will help their minds, develop their attitudes, and give them values. That is why I'm so grateful that you have honored me in that spirit.

A cover story in Time magazine proclaimed him "The Texan Who Conquered Russia". His triumph in Moscow propelled Cliburn to international prominence.

=== Success ===
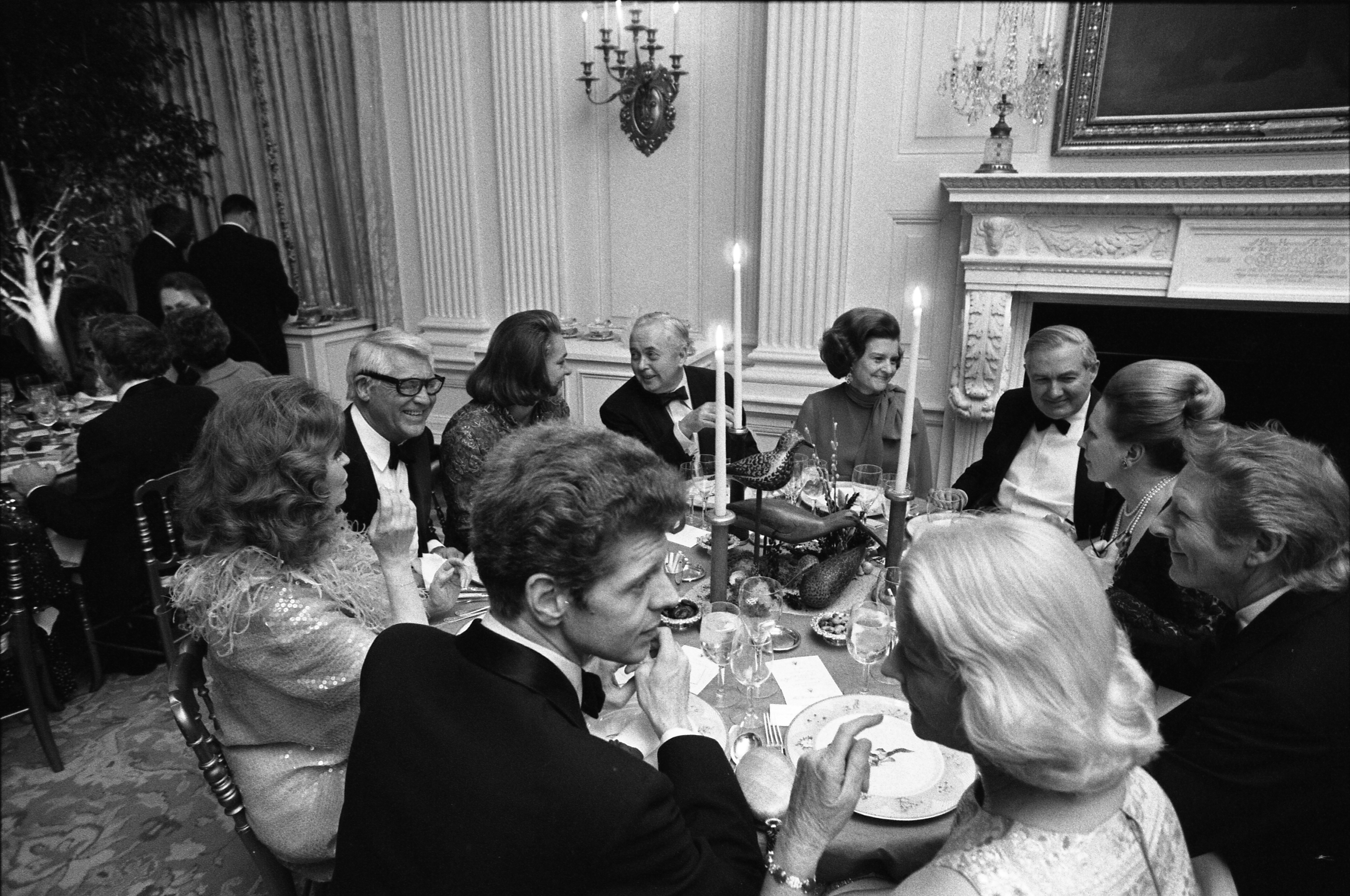
Photograph of First Lady Betty Ford, Prime Minister Harold Wilson of Great Britain, Happy Rockefeller, Cary Grant, Eileen Mehle, Van Cliburn, Mrs. Winston Guest, Danny Kaye, Margaret Truman Daniel, and British Secretary of State James Callaghan seated in the State Dining Room during a State Dinner Honoring Prime Minister Wilson

Upon returning to the United States, Cliburn appeared in a Carnegie Hall concert with the Symphony of the Air, conducted by Kirill Kondrashin, who had led the Moscow Philharmonic in the prize-winning performances in Moscow. The performance of the Rachmaninoff 3rd Piano Concerto at this concert was subsequently released by RCA Victor on LP. Cliburn was also invited by Steve Allen to play a solo during Allen's prime time NBC television series on May 25, 1958. He later went to the White House to meet with President Eisenhower to discuss relations with the USSR.

RCA Victor signed him to an exclusive contract, and his subsequent recording, Tchaikovsky Piano Concerto No. 1 was at the No. 1 position on the Billboard Top 200 albums for much of August and September 1958. The album also won the 1958 Grammy Award for Best Classical Performance. It was certified a gold record in 1961, and it became the first classical album to go platinum, achieving that certification in 1989. It was the best-selling classical album in the world for more than a decade. It eventually went triple-platinum. In 2004, this recording was re-mastered from the original studio analogue tapes, and released on a Super Audio CD.

Other standard repertoire Cliburn recorded include the Brahms Piano Concerto No. 2, Schumann Piano Concerto in A minor, Grieg Piano Concerto in A minor, Rachmaninoff Piano Concerto No. 2, Beethoven Piano Concerto No. 4 and No. 5 "Emperor", and the Prokofiev Piano Concerto No. 3.

In 1958, during a dinner hosted by the National Guild of Piano Teachers, President and Founder Dr. Irl Allison announced a cash prize of $10,000 to be used for a piano competition named in Cliburn's honor. Under the leadership of Grace Ward Lankford and with the dedicated efforts of local music teachers and volunteers, the first Van Cliburn International Piano Competition was held from September 24 to October 7, 1962, at Texas Christian University in Fort Worth. Until his death, Cliburn continued to serve as Director Emeritus for the Van Cliburn Foundation, as host of the quadrennial competition and host of other programs honoring his legacy.

In 1961, he first performed at the Interlochen Center for the Arts during its summer camp. He went on to do so for eighteen more years.

Cliburn returned to the Soviet Union on several occasions. His performances there were usually recorded and even televised. In a 1962 Moscow appearance, Nikita Khrushchev, who met Cliburn again on this visit, and Andrei Gromyko, the Soviet Foreign Minister, were "spotted in the audience applauding enthusiastically". According to The Wall Street Journal, "Mr. Cliburn's affection for the Soviet people—and theirs for him—was notable in its warmth during a prolonged period of superpower strain." A 1972 concert performance of the Brahms Piano Concerto No. 2 with Kondrashin and the Moscow orchestra, as well as a studio recording of Rachmaninoff's Rhapsody on a Theme of Paganini, were later issued on CD by RCA Victor.

On May 26, 1972, Cliburn gave a concert at Spaso House, the residence of the United States Ambassador to Russia, for an audience that included President Richard Nixon, Secretary of State William P. Rogers, and Soviet government officials.

=== Comeback ===
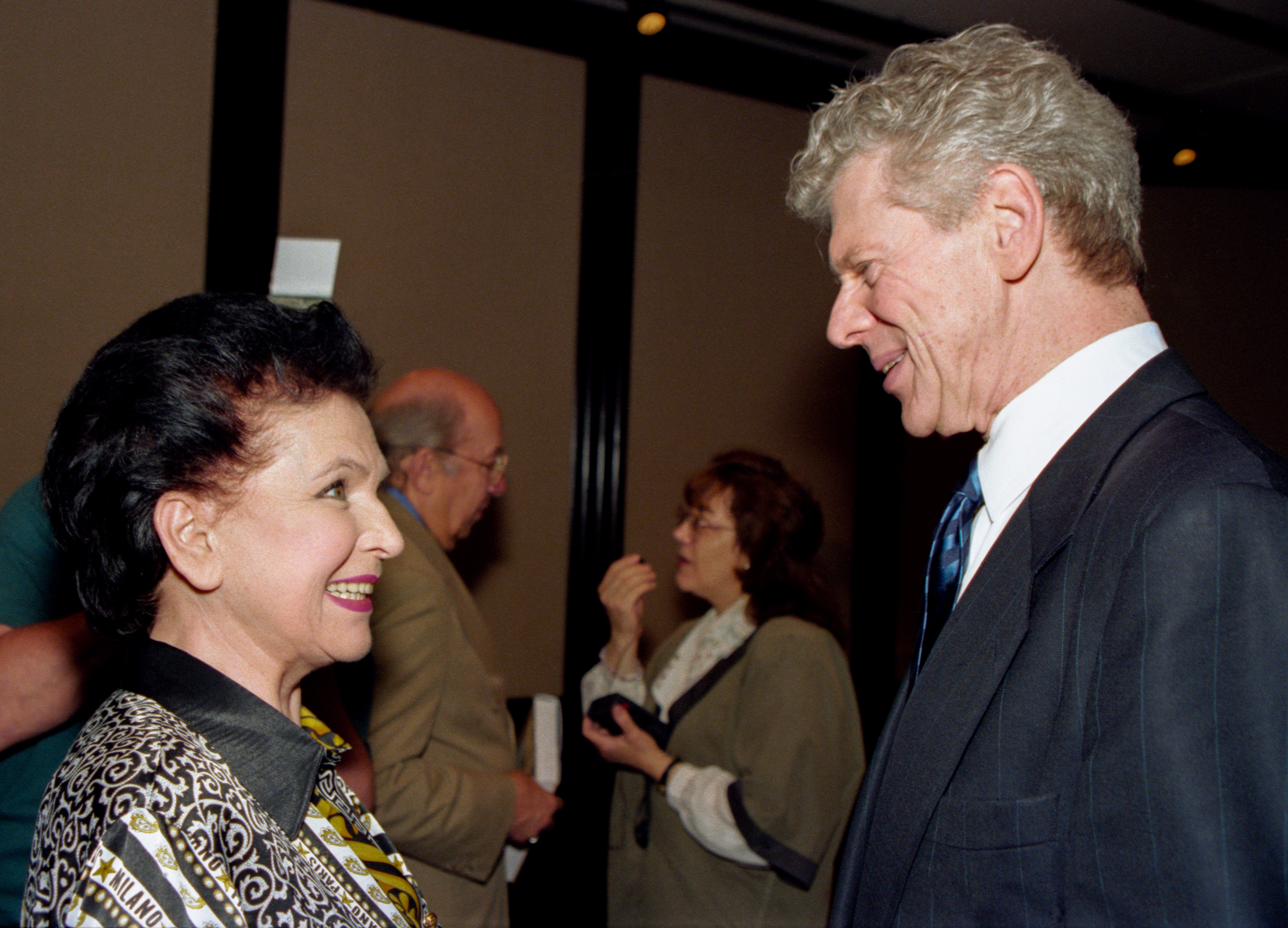
With Galina Vishnevskaya in Moscow, 18 June 1998

Cliburn performed and recorded through the 1970s, but in 1978, after the deaths of his father and of his manager, Sol Hurok, he began a hiatus from public life. In 1987, he was invited to perform at the White House for President Ronald Reagan and Soviet president Mikhail Gorbachev and afterward was invited to open the 100th anniversary season of Carnegie Hall. He embarked on a 16-city tour in 1994, commencing with a performance of the Tchaikovsky concerto at the Hollywood Bowl. That same year Cliburn performed the National Anthem along with the Fort Worth Symphony Orchestra at the First Official Opening Day at Choctaw Stadium. Also in 1994, Cliburn made a guest appearance in the cartoon Iron Man, playing himself in the episode "Silence My Companion, Death My Destination". In his late seventies, he gave a limited number of performances to critical and popular acclaim. Cliburn appeared as a Pennington Great Performers series artist with the Baton Rouge Symphony Orchestra in 2006.

He played for royalty and heads of state from dozens of countries and for every U.S. president from 1958 until his death.

== Honors ==
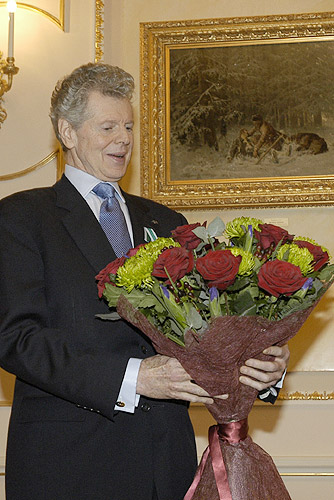
Receiving the Order of Friendship in Moscow, Russia, in 2004

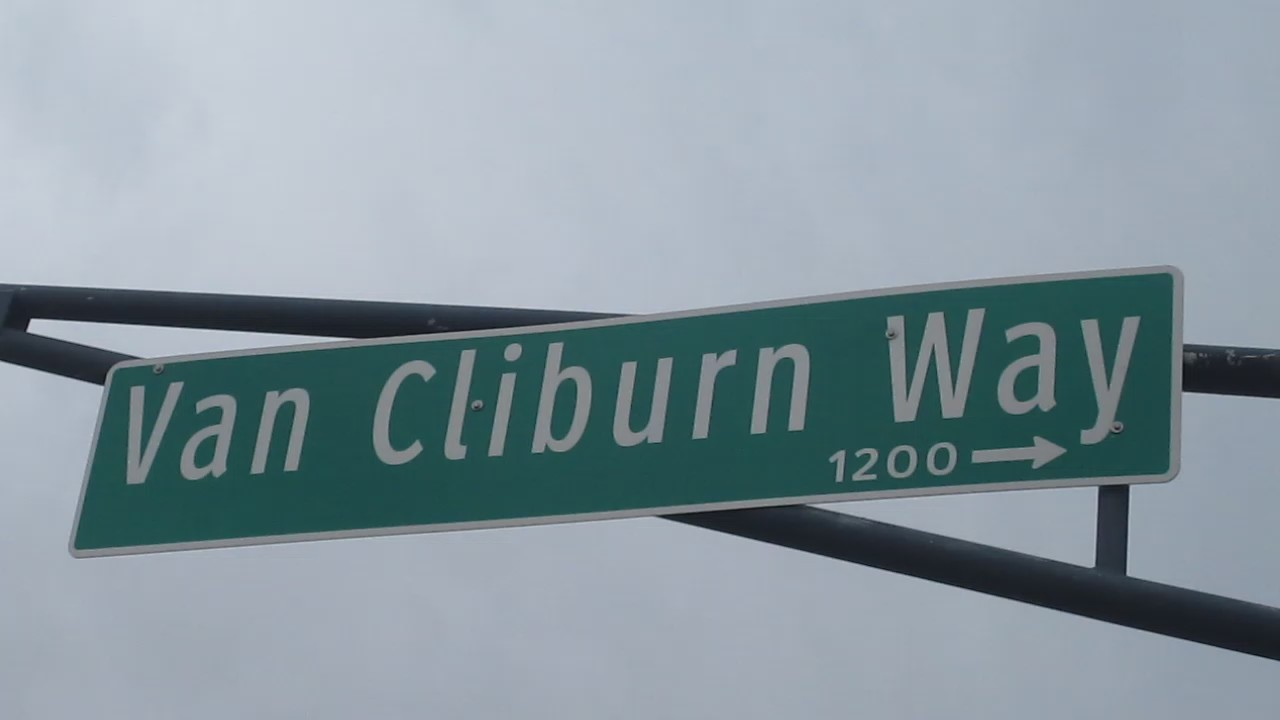
Van Cliburn Way in the Fort Worth Cultural District

Cliburn received the Kennedy Center Honors on December 2, 2001. He was awarded the Presidential Medal of Freedom on July 23, 2003, by President George W. Bush, and, on September 20, 2004, the Russian Order of Friendship, the highest civilian awards of the two countries. He was also awarded the Grammy Lifetime Achievement Award the same year and played at a surprise 50th birthday party for United States Secretary of State Condoleezza Rice. He was a member of the Alpha Chi chapter of Phi Mu Alpha Sinfonia, and was awarded the fraternity's Charles E. Lutton Man of Music Award in 1962. He was presented a 2010 National Medal of Arts by President Barack Obama on March 2, 2011.

Cliburn's 1958 piano performance in Moscow, when he won the prestigious Tchaikovsky International Piano Competition, has been added to the National Recording Registry in the Library of Congress for long-term preservation.

== Personal life ==
Cliburn was a member of Broadway Baptist Church in Fort Worth and attended regularly when he was in town.

In 1996, Cliburn was named in a lawsuit by his domestic partner of 17 years, mortician Thomas Zaremba. In the suit, Zaremba claimed entitlement to a portion of Cliburn's income and assets and asserted that he might have been exposed to HIV, causing emotional distress. Cliburn denied the allegations, with his attorney, Dee Kelly, stating that "Van Cliburn categorically denies the charges." Cliburn's defense team further maintained that the claims were not only false, but that they amounted to extortion. Zaremba's attorney, Mike McCurley, acknowledged that Zaremba did not have AIDS and further admitted that "he had no reason to believe that Cliburn has HIV." The claims were dismissed by a trial court and rejected by an appellate court, on the basis that palimony suits were not permitted in the state of Texas unless the relationship is based on a written agreement.

Cliburn was known as a night owl. He often practiced the piano until 4:30 or 5:00 am, then slept until around 1:30 pm. "You feel like you're alone and the world's asleep, and it's very inspiring."

== Death ==
On August 27, 2012, Cliburn's publicist announced that the pianist had advanced bone cancer, had undergone treatment and was "resting comfortably at home" in Fort Worth, where he received around-the-clock care. Cliburn died on February 27, 2013, at the age of 78.

His services were held on March 3, 2013, at the Broadway Baptist Church, with entombment at Greenwood Memorial Park Mausoleum in Fort Worth. His obituary lists as his only survivor his "friend of longstanding", Thomas L. Smith.

== Legacy ==
The Wall Street Journal said on his death that Cliburn was a "cultural hero" who "rocketed to unheard-of stardom for a classical musician in the U.S." Calling him "the rare classical musician to enjoy rock star status", the Associated Press on his death noted the 1958 Time cover story that likened him to "Horowitz, Liberace, and Presley all rolled into one".

A year after Cliburn's death, a free anniversary concert was held on February 27, 2014, in his honor in downtown Fort Worth. "It's part of the Cliburn ideology of sharing the music with the larger audience", said Jacques Marquis, the Cliburn Foundation president.

A highlight of Cliburn's legacy was the profoundly positive reception of his person and performances in the Soviet Union during and after the Tchaikovsky competition. The same is true of his reception during and after the Cold War in the Soviet Union. According to Life (1958), the excitement and hype surrounding the news of Cliburn's debut in Moscow was almost too much to bear for some. They became infatuated with him and made no attempt to conceal it. "In the preliminaries, which had enlisted 50 young pianists from 19 different countries, Van was the big crowd-pleaser. Fans called him Vanyusha. Girls trailed him to the hotel. Soviet record companies pleaded with him to wax anything. In the finals, when he crashed out the last chords of the Rachmaninoff Third Concerto, the ecstatic audience in Moscow chanted 'first prize—first prize'."

Mark MacNamara of the San Francisco Classical Voice wrote: "The 6-foot 4-inch aw-shucks kid from Shreveport was 23, the son of an oil executive and a Juilliard graduate, and by all accounts didn't have a mean bone in his body. Indeed, much of his charm, then and throughout his life, was that he seemed so genuinely unaware of intrigue and enmity. Cliburn's talents were astounding, and he had a heart that loved people and music. This is a legacy that lasts."

As of the last International Tchaikovsky Competition (2023), Van Cliburn is still the only American to win the competition in piano. Five Americans have won medals at the Van Cliburn International Piano Competition in its 64-year history:

  - Ralph Votapek (1962)
  - Christopher O'Riley (1981)
  - Jon Nakamatsu (1997)
  - Kenny Broberg (2017)
  - Evren Ozel (2025)
  .

=== Lasting impact ===
Cliburn's contributions to society were many and one of his most notable contributions was the Van Cliburn International Piano Competition. The competition was founded in 1962 and is held every four years since then.

== See also ==
- List of classical pianists
- List of Juilliard School people
- List of people from Fort Worth, Texas
- List of people from Shreveport, Louisiana
- List of Presidential Medal of Freedom recipients
- List of RCA Records artists

== Sources ==
- "The All-American Virtuoso". Time. May 19, 1958. Archived from the original on February 8, 2008.
