= Around the World in 80 Days (soundtrack) =

Michael Todd's Around the World in 80 Days – Music from the Sound Track

Soundtrack album by Victor Young
- Released: 1957
- Label: Decca

Professional ratings
Review scores
| Source | Rating |
|---|---|
| AllMusic | 4/5 stars |

The original soundtrack to the 1956 United Artists film Around the World in 80 Days was released by Decca Records.

The album was released as a 12-inch LP (Decca DL 9046) and as a set of three 7-inch 45-rpm EPs (Decca ED 836).

The album peaked at number 1 on Billboard's Best Selling Pop Albums. It finished 1957 as the fourth best-selling album of the year in the United States according to the magazine. The score was mostly written by Victor Young, who won the Best Music Score of a Dramatic or Comedy Picture Oscar at the 29th Academy Awards in 1957, although posthumously.

== Track listing ==
12-inch LP

Side 1
| No. | Title | Length |
|---|---|---|
| 1. | "Around the World—Part I" | 3:01 |
| 2. | "Passepartout" | 3:21 |
| 3. | "Paris Arrival" | 2:47 |
| 4. | "Sky Symphony" | 4:30 |
| 5. | "(a)" "Invitation to a Bull Fight" "(b)" "Entrance of the Bull March" | 2:34 |
| 6. | "India Country Side" | 3:53 |
| 7. | "Around the World—Part II" | 1:04 |

Side 2
| No. | Title | Length |
|---|---|---|
| 1. | "The Pagoda of Pillagi" | 4:00 |
| 2. | "Temple of Dawn" | 2:15 |
| 3. | "Prairie Sail Car" | 1:47 |
| 4. | "Land Ho" | 6:56 |
| 5. | "Epilogue" | 6:22 |

== Charts ==
=== Weekly charts ===
| Chart (1957) | Peak position |
|---|---|
| US Billboard Best Selling Pop Albums | 1 |

=== Year-end charts ===
| Chart (1957) | Position |
|---|---|
| US Billboard 200 | 4 |
