= Tchaikovsky Piano Concerto No. 1 (Van Cliburn 1958 recording) =

Tchaikovsky Piano Concerto No. 1

The Tchaikovsky Piano Concerto No. 1 was the first recording of Van Cliburn in 1958 for RCA Victor. It won Cliburn a Grammy Award and was the first classical recording to go platinum, that is to sell more than a million copies. The RCA Victor Symphony Orchestra was conducted by Kirill Kondrashin who at Cliburn's request had been given permission to leave the Soviet Union.
