= Music recording certification =

Certification that a music recording has shipped, sold, or streamed a number of units

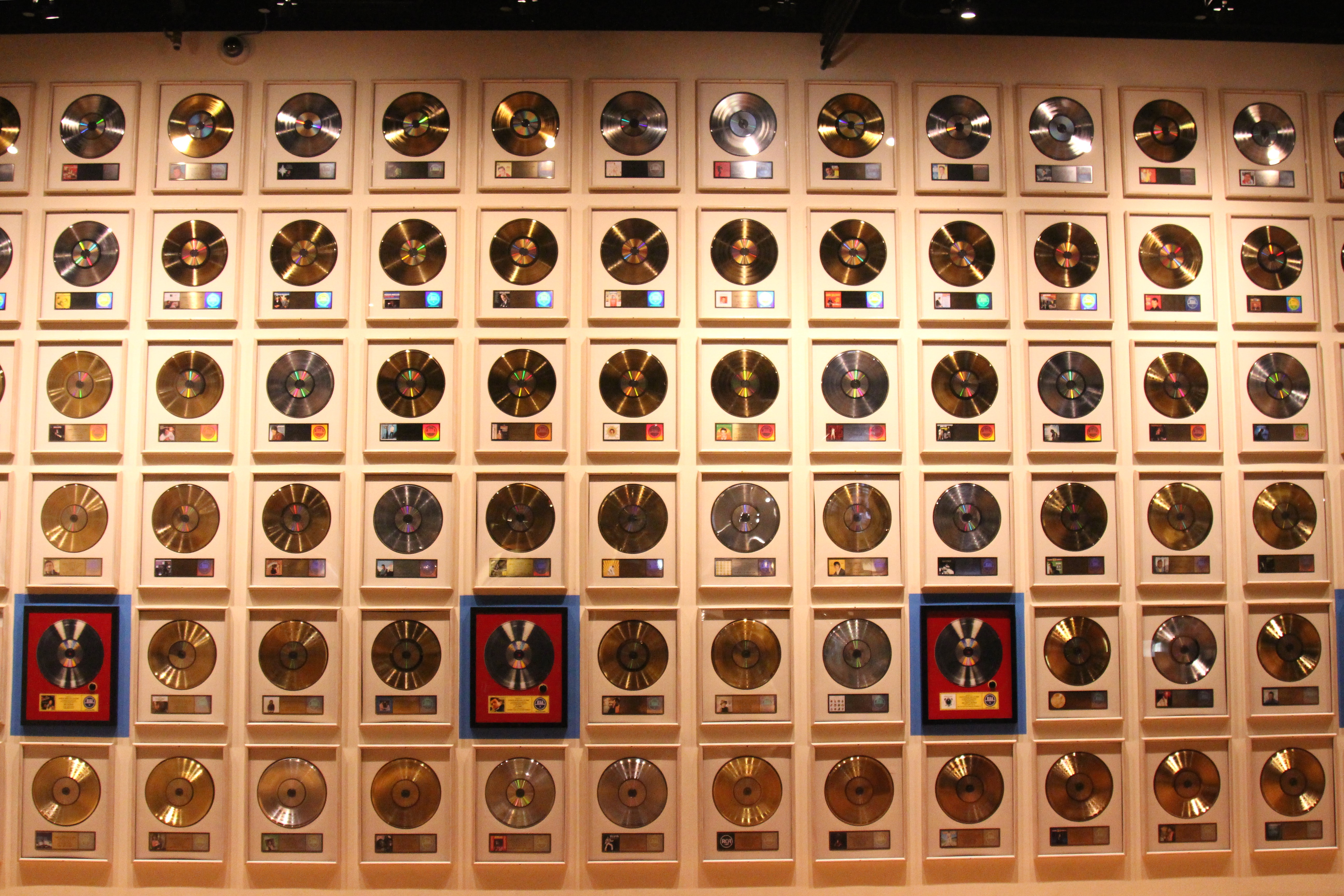
A wall of Gold and Platinum records on display at Country Music Hall of Fame and Museum

Music recording certification is a system of certifying that a music recording has shipped, sold, or streamed a certain number of units. The threshold quantity varies by type (such as album, single, music video) and by nation or territory.

Almost all countries follow variations of the RIAA certification categories, which are named after precious materials (gold, platinum and diamond).

The threshold required for these awards depends upon the population of the territory where the recording is released. Typically, they are awarded only to international releases and are awarded individually for each country where the album is sold. Different sales levels, some perhaps 10 times greater than others, may exist for different music media (for example: videos versus albums, singles, or music download).

== History ==
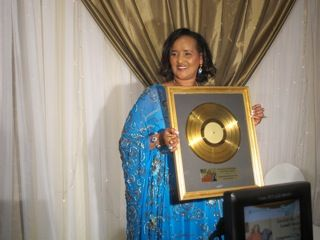
Somali singer Saado Ali Warsame receiving a gold record Lifetime Achievement Award

The original gold and silver record awards were presented to artists by their own record companies to publicize their sales achievements. The first silver disc was awarded by Regal Zonophone to George Formby in December 1937 for sales of 100,000 copies of "The Window Cleaner".

The first literal gold record award was presented to Glenn Miller and His Orchestra by RCA Victor (for subsidiary label Bluebird Records) on February 10, 1942, celebrating the sale of 1.2 million copies of the single, "Chattanooga Choo Choo".

Further examples of company awards are the gold records awarded in 1956 by RCA Victor to Harry Belafonte for his album Calypso for being the first LP record album to sell more than one million copies and Elvis Presley for one million units sold of his RCA Victor single "Don't Be Cruel". Also in 1956, Decca's presented a gold record award to Jerry Lewis for the single "Rock-a-Bye Your Baby with a Dixie Melody".

At the industry level, in 1958 the Recording Industry Association of America (“RIAA”) introduced its gold record award program for records of any kind, albums or singles, which achieved one million dollars in retail sales. These sales were restricted to U.S.-based record companies and did not include exports to other countries. For albums in 1968, this would require shipping domestically approximately 670,000 units, while for singles the number would be 1,000,000.

In 1976, the RIAA introduced the platinum certification for the sale of one million units for albums and two million for singles, with the gold certification redefined for sales of 500,000 units for albums (singles remained at one million). No album was certified platinum prior to this year. The 1958 RCA Victor recording by Van Cliburn of the Tchaikovsky Piano Concerto would eventually be awarded a platinum citation, but this did not occur until two decades after its release. In 1999, the diamond certification was introduced for sales of ten million units. In the late 1980s, the certification thresholds for singles were dropped to match that of albums.

=== RIAA certification ===
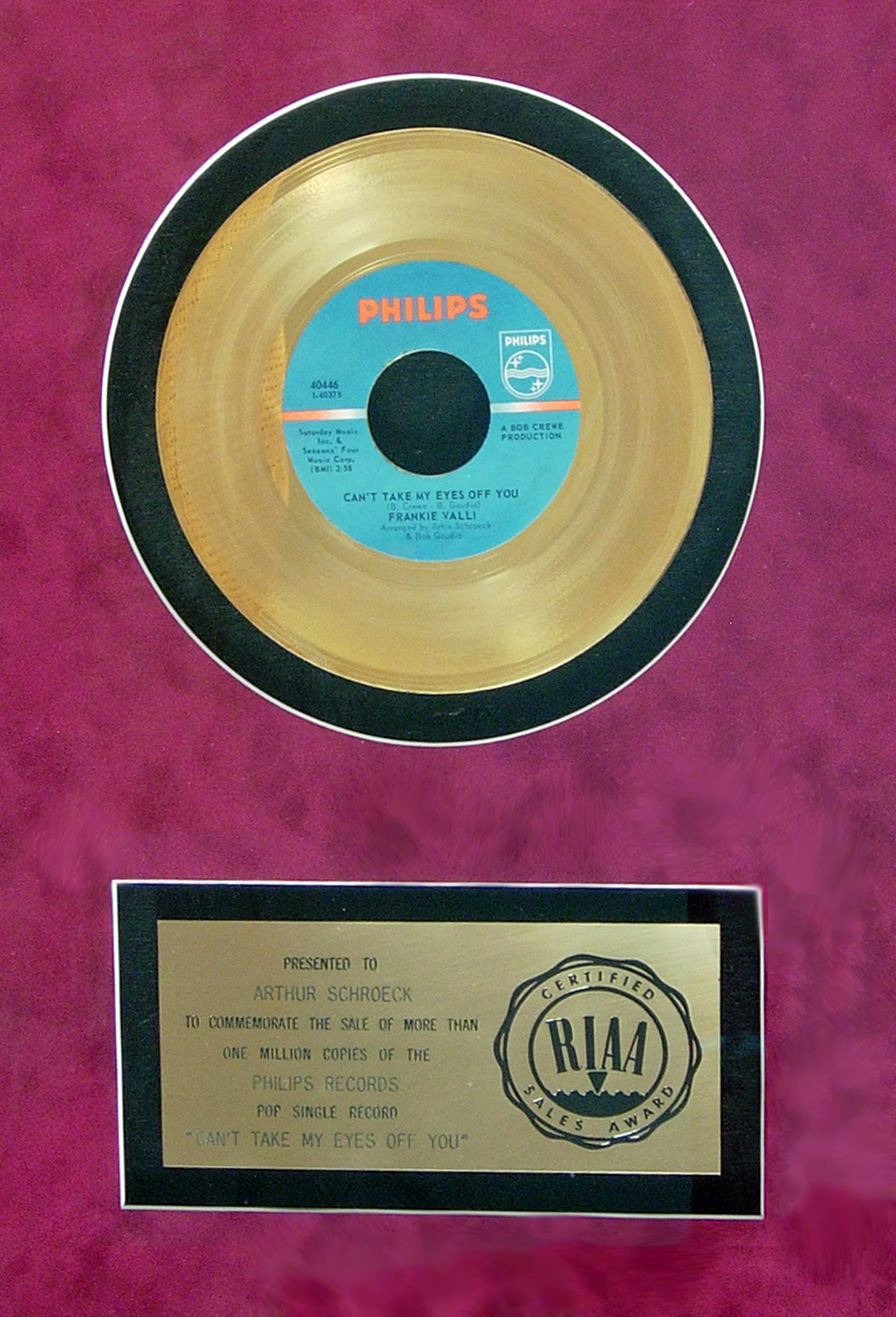
Gold record presented to Artie Schroeck for his arrangement on "Can't Take My Eyes Off You", 1967

The first official designation of a "gold record" by the Recording Industry Association of America (RIAA) was established for singles in 1958, and the RIAA also trademarked the term "gold record" in the United States. On 14 March 1958, the RIAA certified its first gold record, Perry Como's hit single "Catch a Falling Star". The Oklahoma! soundtrack was certified as the first gold album four months later. In 1976, RIAA introduced the platinum certification, first awarded to the Eagles compilation album Their Greatest Hits (1971–1975) on 24 February 1976, and to Johnnie Taylor's single "Disco Lady" on 22 April 1976. As music sales increased with the introduction of compact discs, the RIAA created the Multi-Platinum award in 1984. Diamond awards, honoring those artists whose sales of singles or albums reached 10,000,000 copies, were introduced in 1999.

In the 20th century, and for a part of the first decade of the 21st, it was common for distributors to claim certifications based on their shipments – wholesale to retail outlets – which led to many certifications which outstripped the actual final retail sales figures. This became much less common once the majority of retail sales became paid digital downloads and digital streaming.

=== Digital media certification ===
In most countries, certifications no longer apply solely to physical media but now also include sales awards recognizing digital downloads (in the US and UK since 2004). In June 2006, the RIAA also certified the ringtone downloads of songs. Streaming from on-demand services such as Apple Music, Spotify, Tidal and Napster has been included into existing digital certification in the US since 2013, and the UK and Germany since 2014. In the US and Germany, video streaming services like YouTube, VEVO, Xite, and Yahoo! Music also began to be counted towards the certification, in both cases using the formula of 100 streams being equivalent to one download. Other countries, such as Denmark and Spain, maintain separate awards for digital download singles and streaming.

=== Symbolic certifications ===
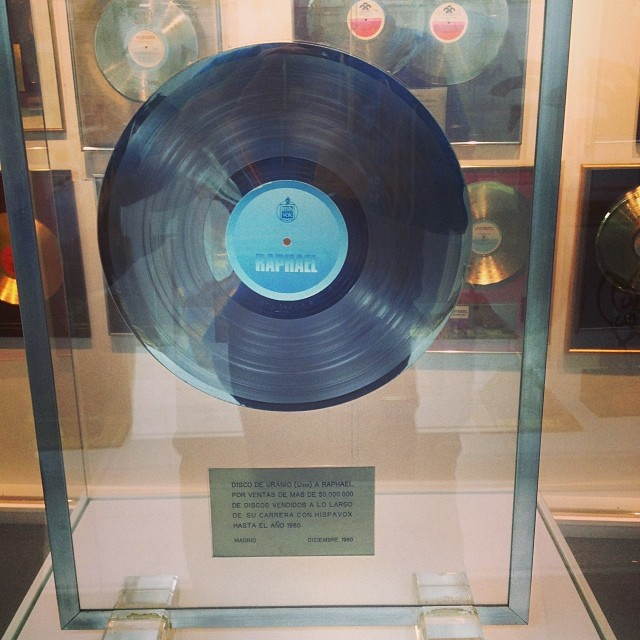
"Uranium disc" granted to Raphael by his label Hispavox and collecting society music group SGAE in early 1980s

Other recording artists have received special and symbolic recognitions, including Raphael with a "Uranium disc" granted by Hispavox and SGAE in early 1980s recognizing his career's sales. Luis Miguel received in 1999 a "Lapislazuli disc" for his sales of over 1.7 million in Chile, and Luis Fonsi received the "Plutonium disc" from Universal Music Group recognizing the global sales of "Despacito" in 2017.

=== IFPI certification ===
The International Federation of the Phonographic Industry (IFPI) was founded in 1933, and since 1996, has granted the Platinum Europe Award for album sales over one million within Europe and (as of October 2009) the Middle East. Multi-platinum Europe Awards are presented for sales in subsequent multiples of one million. Eligibility is unaffected by time (from date of release), and is not restricted to European-based artists.

=== IMPALA certification ===
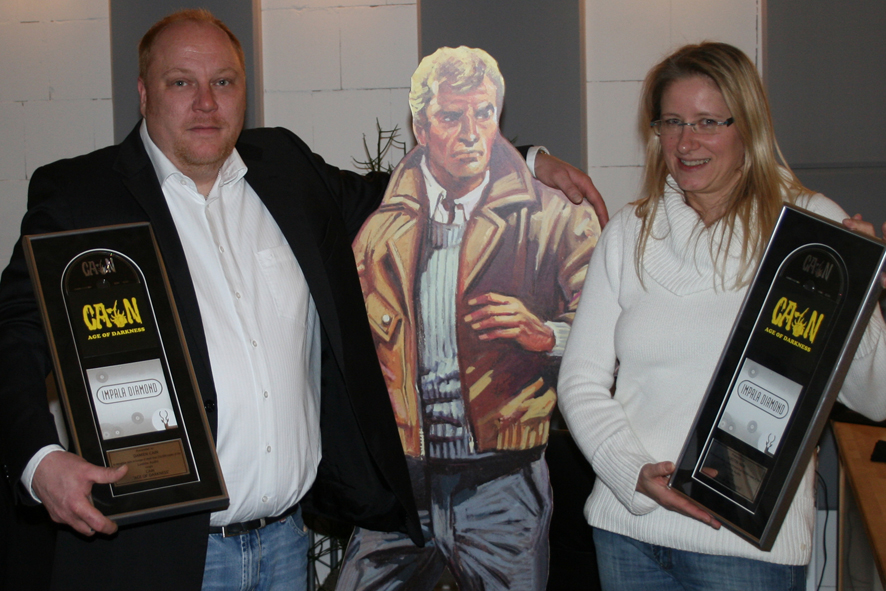
German band CAIN receiving an Impala Diamond Award in 2011

The Independent Music Companies Association (IMPALA) was founded in April 2000 to grow the independent music sector and promote independent music in the interests of artistic, entrepreneurial and cultural diversity. IMPALA launched sales awards in 2005 as the first sales awards recognising that success on a pan-European basis begins well before sales reach one million.

The award levels are Silver (20,000+), Double Silver (40,000+), Gold (75,000+), Double Gold (150,000+), Diamond (200,000+), Platinum (400,000+) and Double Platinum (800,000+).

== Certification thresholds ==
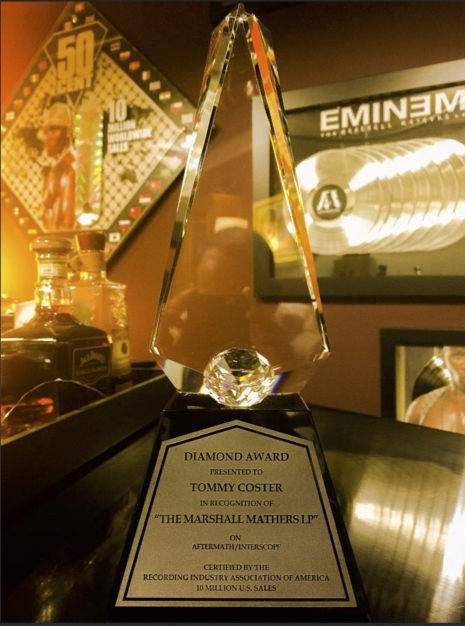
The "Diamond Award" granted by the Recording Industry Association of America (RIAA) recognizes 10 million units sold in the United States for both albums and singles.

Below are certification thresholds for the United States, United Kingdom, Canada and France. The numbers in the tables are in terms of "units", where a unit represents one sale or one shipment of a given medium. Certification is often awarded cumulatively, and it is possible for one release to be certified silver, gold, and platinum in turn. An album that becomes Platinum twice over, for example, an album which has sold 2,000,000 copies in the United States, is said to be "Double Platinum", or sometimes "Multi-Platinum". Since 2013 in the U.S., and 2014 in the UK and Germany, streaming of songs counts towards certification of singles with 150 streams being the equivalent of 1 single sold, or one tenth of an album. Since February 2016, RIAA includes on-demand audio and video streams and a track sale equivalent in Gold and Platinum Album Award. The program counts both sales and streams for single and album certifications.

United States

Media	Gold	Platinum	Diamond
Album	500,000	1,000,000	10,000,000
Single	500,000	1,000,000	10,000,000
Music video	50,000	100,000	1,000,000

United Kingdom

Media	Silver	Gold	Platinum
Album	60,000	100,000	300,000
Single	200,000	400,000	600,000
Music video	25,000	50,000	75,000

Canada

Media	Gold	Platinum	Diamond
Album	40,000	80,000	800,000
Single	40,000	80,000	800,000
Music video	5,000	10,000	100,000

France

Media	Gold	Platinum	Diamond
Album	50,000	100,000	500,000
Single	75,000	150,000	250,000
Music video	7,500	15,000	60,000

== Manufacture of awards ==
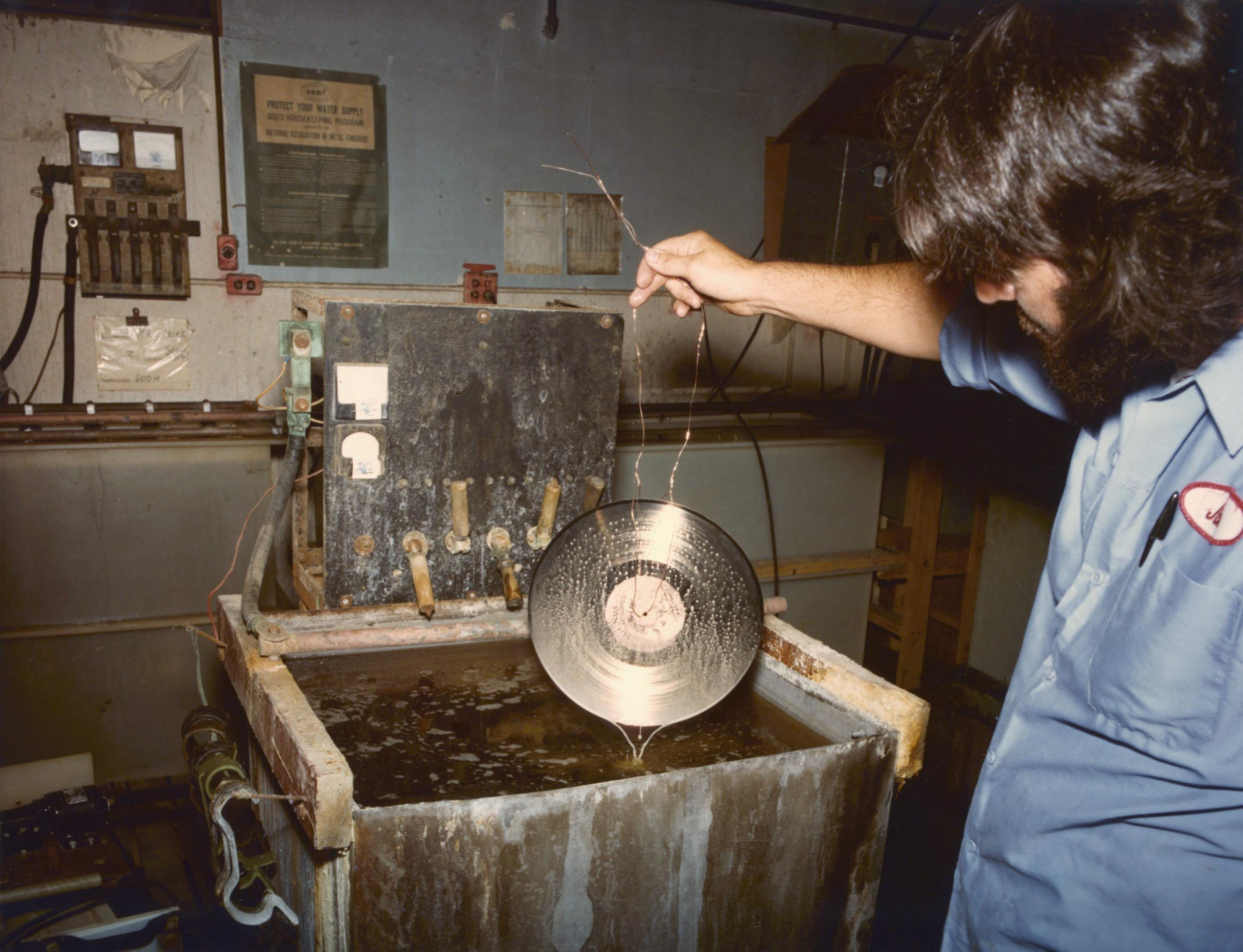
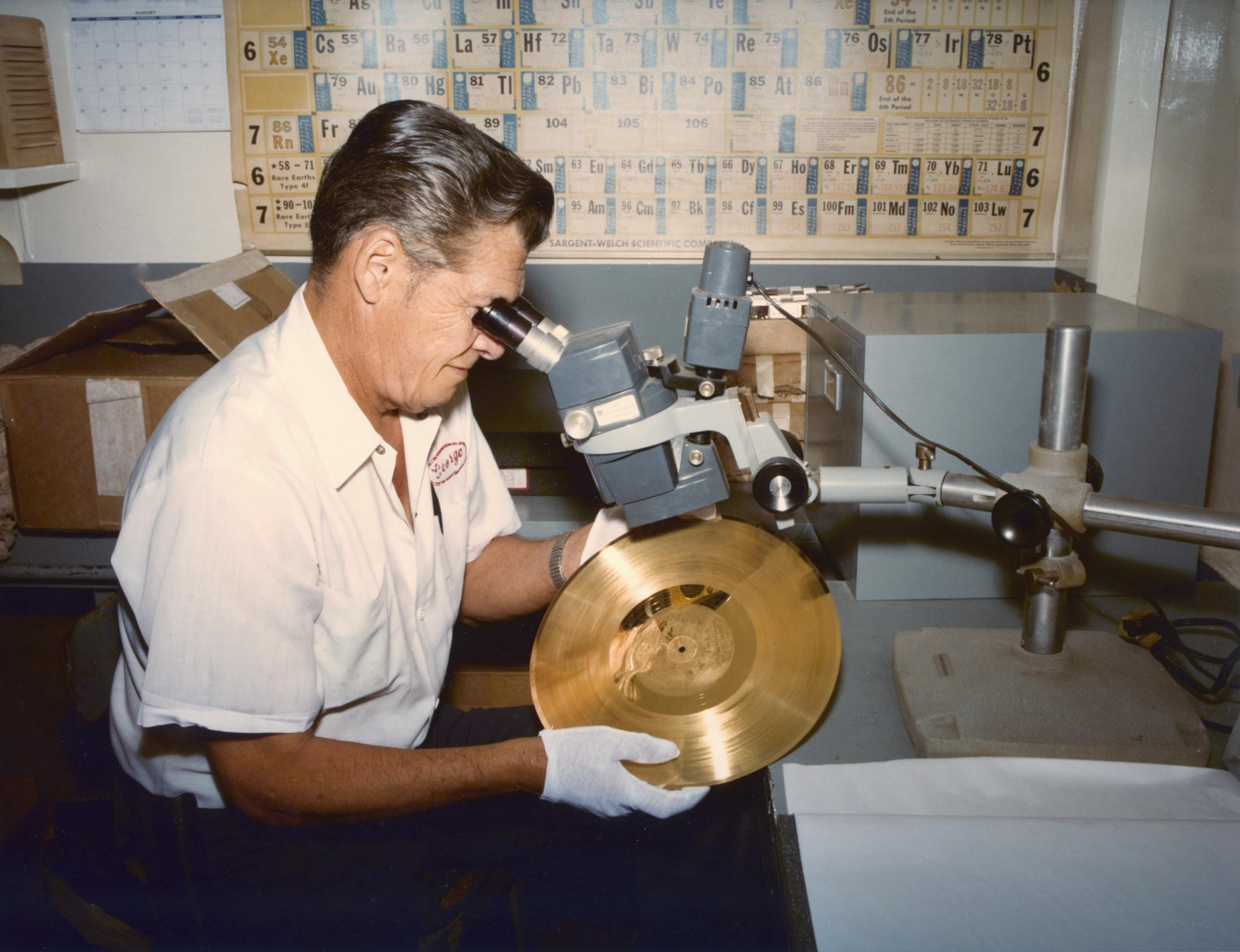
Plating of the historical phonograph Voyager Golden Record

The plaques themselves contain various items under the glass. Modern awards often use CDs instead of records. Most gold and platinum records are actually vinyl records which have been vacuum metallized and tinted, while trimmed and plated metal "masters", "mothers", or "stampers" (metal parts used for pressing records out of vinyl) were initially used. The music in the grooves on the record may not match the actual recording being awarded.

Individual plaque-makers produced their awards according to available materials and techniques employed by their graphic arts departments. The plaques, depending on size and elaborateness of design, cost anywhere between US$135 and $275, most often ordered and purchased by the record label that issued the original recording.

== See also ==
- List of best-selling albums
- List of best-selling singles
- Art release
- YouTube Creator Awards
