= I'll Be Home on Christmas Day =

1971 song by Elvis Presley

Song by Elvis Presley

from the album Elvis sings The Wonderful World of Christmas
- Written: 1971
- Published: Elvis Presley Music
- Released: October 20, 1971
- Recorded: 1971
- Studio: RCA Studio B (Nashville, Tennessee)
- Genre: Christmas music
- Label: RCA Victor
- Songwriter: Michael Jarrett
- Composer: Michael Jarrett
- Lyricist: Michael Jarrett
- Producer: Felton Jarvis

"I'll Be Home on Christmas Day" is a Christmas song recorded by Elvis Presley for his 1971 album Elvis sings The Wonderful World of Christmas. It was written by Michael Jarrett and published by Elvis Presley Music.

== Theme ==
The theme of the song is returning home for Christmas day. The narrator of the song recounts how he has done everything in Georgia and Tennessee but now wishes he has the "sense" to take the next train to his home on Christmas day. He has seen and done everything. But the one regret he has is to return home on Christmas. He invoked the "hills of Georgia" and "the plains of Tennessee". He wants to "borrow one dream from yesterday".

The one he left behind has a candle that was burning in the window. He recounts how tears were shed over the parting and separation. He only wishes he had the sense to take the next train home for Christmas.

He still thinks fondly of her but he has a "troubled mind" when he recalls the lingering memories. He still retains his love for her. But his pride prevents him from returning.

The song closes with him lamenting the fact that he lacks the sense to take the next train to return home to her on Christmas day.

== Personnel ==
James Burton is the lead guitarist, Chip Young is on rhythm guitar, Norbert Putnam is on bass, David Briggs is on piano, and Kenneth Buttrey is the drummer.

== Reissues ==
The track was featured on the Follow That Dream release of alternate takes of the songs on the album. Takes 1-6 of the song were released along with the remake master and alternate remake takes.

== Sources ==
- Elvis Sings The Wonderful World of Christmas at AllMusic
- Christgau, Robert (1981). "Consumer Guide '70s: P". Christgau's Record Guide: Rock Albums of the Seventies. Ticknor & Fields. ISBN 089919026X. Retrieved March 10, 2019 – via robertchristgau.com.
- Graff, Gary; Durchholz, Daniel, eds. (1999). MusicHound Rock: The Essential Album Guide. Farmington Hills, MI: Visible Ink Press. p. 892. ISBN 1-57859-061-2.
- "Elvis Presley: Album Guide". rollingstone.com. Archived from the original on September 18, 2013. Retrieved June 20, 2015.
- Simpson, Paul (2004). The Rough Guide to Elvis. London: Rough Guides. p. 146. ISBN 1-84353-417-7.
- "Elvis sings The Wonderful World of Christmas". RIAA. 2013. Retrieved October 19, 2013. Note: Enter advanced search for The Wonderful World of Christmas
- "Elvis Presley Recording Sessions: May 16–17, 1971". Keith Flynn's Elvis Presley Pages. http://keithflynn.com/recording-sessions/710516.html
- "Elvis Presley Recording Sessions: May 15–16, 1971". Keith Flynn's Elvis Presley Pages. http://keithflynn.com/recording-sessions/710515.html
- "Live Recordings for NBC TV Special 'Elvis': 6PM Sit-Down Show". 27 June 1968. Keith Flynn's Elvis Presley Pages. http://keithflynn.com/recording-sessions/680627_6pm.html
- "Live Recordings for NBC TV Special 'Elvis': 8PM Sit-Down Show". 27 June 1968. Keith Flynn's Elvis Presley Pages. http://keithflynn.com/recording-sessions/680627_8pm.html
