= Elvis Sings The Wonderful World of Christmas =

Studio album by Elvis Presley
- Released: October 20, 1971
- Recorded: June 27, 1968 (live version of "Blue Christmas", on some re-releases); May 15–17, 1971 and June 10, 1971 (main sessions); May 24, 1971; June 21–22, 1971; July 26, 1971 (various overdub sessions)
- Studio: RCA Studio B (Nashville, Tennessee)
- Genre: Christmas, pop, rock and roll
- Length: 35:06
- Label: RCA Victor
- Producer: Felton Jarvis

Elvis Presley chronology
I Got Lucky (1971)	Elvis Sings The Wonderful World of Christmas (1971)	Elvis Now (1972)

Singles from Elvis Sings The Wonderful World of Christmas
- 1. "Merry Christmas Baby" / "O Come All Ye Faithful" Released: November 1971

Professional ratings
Review scores
Source	Rating
AllMusic	3/5 stars
Christgau's Record Guide	B+
MusicHound	3.5/5 stars
The Rolling Stone Album Guide	4/5 stars
Rough Guides	2/5 stars

Elvis Sings The Wonderful World of Christmas is the fifteenth studio album and second Christmas album by American singer Elvis Presley, released by RCA Records in October 1971. It was Presley's first collection of new Christmas recordings since Elvis' Christmas Album (1957). Two songs from the album, "Merry Christmas Baby" and "O Come All Ye Faithful", were issued as a single in November. The album topped the Christmas LP's chart that year and would have charted high on the Billboard Top LPs chart, but from 1963 to 1973, holiday albums were not allowed to chart. Though lacking the commercial appeal of Elvis' Christmas Album from 1957, it gradually became a perennial favorite. In 1976, the album was reissued in the mid-priced RCA Pure Gold series with a new catalog number (ANL1-1936). The LP was certified Gold on November 4, 1977, Platinum on December 1, 1977, 2× Platinum on May 20, 1988, and 3× Platinum on July 15, 1999, by the RIAA.

Several of the songs on the album were published by Elvis Presley's publishing company, such as "Holly Leaves and Christmas Trees", "I'll Be Home on Christmas Day", "If I Get Home on Christmas Day" and "On a Snowy Christmas Night". Presley is accompanied on most of the songs by The Imperials Quartet.

RCA reissued the album on compact disc in 1988. The CD release includes an extended version of "Merry Christmas Baby" and a bonus live track, "Blue Christmas", which was recorded on June 27, 1968, and had been previously released on the 1968 album, Elvis.

In 2017, a two-CD special edition of the album was released on Follow That Dream Records, with a significant number of unreleased takes and unedited versions of the songs that made up the original LP.

In 2021, RCA released Elvis Back in Nashville, a collection of recordings from the spring of 1971. These were the songs that made up various albums including Elvis Sings the Wonderful World of Christmas. The four-LP version of this release consists of the raw unedited versions of the songs that would eventually be released after various overdubbing. Of the 21 Christmas related tracks included in the package, the first 11 are presented in the same order as the 1971 release. The remaining tracks are unreleased takes and rehearsals. "Merry Christmas Baby" is presented in its entirety (over 8 minutes) with some short discussion by Elvis prior to the start of the song.

In 2023, RCA re-released the original LP on vinyl, with the track list the same as the original. The cover art for this LP is the same as the 1971 release; however, the rear cover art was altered to reflect then-current updated releases from Elvis' RCA catalog.

== Track listing ==
=== Original release ===
Side one
No.	Title	Writer(s)	Recording date	Length
1.	"O Come, All Ye Faithful"	Traditional; arranged by Elvis Presley	May 16, 1971	2:49
2.	"The First Noel"	Traditional; arranged by Elvis Presley	May 16, 1971	2:11
3.	"On a Snowy Christmas Night"	Stanley J. Gelber	May 16, 1971	2:50
4.	"Winter Wonderland"	Felix Bernard, Richard B. Smith	May 16, 1971	2:20
5.	"The Wonderful World of Christmas"	Charles Tobias, Al Frisch	May 16, 1971	1:59
6.	"It Won't Seem Like Christmas (Without You)"	J. A. Balthrop	May 15, 1971	2:43

Side two
No.	Title	Writer(s)	Recording date	Length
1.	"I'll Be Home on Christmas Day"	Michael Jarrett	May 16, 1971	3:50
2.	"If I Get Home On Christmas Day"	Tony Macaulay	May 15, 1971	2:54
3.	"Holly Leaves and Christmas Trees"	Glen Spreen, Red West	May 15, 1971	2:14
4.	"Merry Christmas Baby"	Lou Baxter, Johnny Moore	May 15, 1971	5:45
5.	"Silver Bells"	Jay Livingston, Ray Evans	May 15, 1971	2:03
6.	"Blue Christmas" (bonus track on some reissue pressings only)	Billy Hayes, Jay W. Johnson	June 27, 1968	2:34

=== Follow That Dream re-issue ===
The original album
No.	Title	Length
1.	"O Come, All Ye Faithful"	2:48
2.	"The First Noel"	2:09
3.	"On A Snowy Christmas Night"	2:49
4.	"Winter Wonderland"	2:17
5.	"The Wonderful World of Christmas"	1:57
6.	"It Won't Seem Like Christmas (Without You)"	2:41
7.	"I'll Be Home on Christmas Day"	3:48
8.	"If I Get Home On Christmas Day"	2:51
9.	"Holly Leaves and Christmas Trees"	2:52
10.	"Merry Christmas Baby"	5:44
11.	"Silver Bells"	2:26

Bonus song
No.	Title	Length
12.	"I'll Be Home On Christmas Day" (remake master)	3:43

First takes
No.	Title	Length
13.	"It Won't Seem Like Christmas (Without You)" (takes 1, 3)	4:36
14.	"If I Get Home on Christmas Day" (take 1)	3:37
15.	"I'll Be Home on Christmas Day" (takes 1, 3)	7:54
16.	"Holly Leaves And Christmas Trees" (takes 1, 2)	3:13
17.	"Silver Bells" (takes 1, 2)	4:41
18.	"I'll Be Home On Christmas Day" (remake takes 1, 2)	5:48

First takes
No.	Title	Length
1.	"I'll Be Home on Christmas Day" (take 4)	4:58
2.	"If I Get Home On Christmas Day" (takes 2, 3)	3:51
3.	"Holly Leaves and Christmas Trees" (take 3)	2:27
4.	"I'll Be Home on Christmas Day" (remake take 3)	4:24
5.	"It Won't Seem Like Christmas (Without You)" (takes 4, 5)	3:03
6.	"O Come, All Ye Faithful" (take 2)	4:28
7.	"If I Get Home on Christmas Day" (take 5)	3:00
8.	"The Lord's Prayer" (public domain)	3:01
9.	"I'll Be Home On Christmas Day" (takes 5, 6)	4:20
10.	"Holly Leaves and Christmas Trees" (takes 4)	2:36
11.	"It Won't Seem Like Christmas (Without You)" (take 6)	3:14
12.	"Merry Christmas Baby" (take 1[unedited version])	8:29
13.	"I'll Be Home on Christmas Day" (remake takes 4, 9)	7:24
14.	"If I Get Home on Christmas Day" (take 7)	2:57
15.	"Holly Leaves and Christmas Trees" (takes 5, 8)	3:39
16.	"Winter Wonderland" (takes 7, 8)	3:53
Total length:		2:11:34

== Personnel ==
Credits from Keith Flynn and Ernst Jorgensen's examination of session tapes and RCA and AFM paperwork.

- Elvis Presley – lead vocals
- James Burton – lead guitar
- Chip Young – rhythm guitar
- Norbert Putnam – bass
- David Briggs – piano
- Kenneth Buttrey – drums (tracks A1–A5, B1)
- Jerry Carrigan – drums (tracks A6, B2–B5)
- Charlie Hodge – rhythm guitar
- Charlie McCoy – harmonica, organ, percussion
- Glen Spreen – organ (tracks A1–A5, B1), additional overdubbed organ (A1)
- Millie Kirkham – backing vocals (tracks A2–A3, A5–A6, B2–B3, B5)
- Gene Estes – marimba (tracks A3, B3, B5)
- Eddie Hinton – overdubbed lead guitar on "Merry Christmas Baby"
- Larrie Londin – additional drums (track B1), additional percussion (A1, A3, B3)
- Farrell Morris – bells (track B5), additional percussion (B5)
- Tommy Shepard – trombone (tracks A3, B3, B5)

The Imperials

- Terry Blackwood – backing vocals (tracks A1–A3, A5–A6, B2–B3, B5)
- Joe Moscheo – backing vocals (tracks A1–A3, A5–A6, B2–B3, B5)
- Jimmie Murray – backing vocals (tracks A1–A3, A5–A6, B2–B3, B5)
- Armond Morales – backing vocals (tracks A1–A3, A5–A6, B2–B3, B5)
- Greg Gordon – backing vocals (tracks A1–A3, A5–A6, B2–B3, B5)

Production and Arrangements

- Felton Jarvis – producer
- Al Pachucki – basic track(s) recording engineer (tracks A1–B5), overdubs recording engineer (organ on A1, background vocals on A2–A3, A5–A6, B2–B3, B5, guitar on B4, bell & percussion on B5)
- Glen Spreen – brass arrangements (tracks A1, A5, B1–B2), string arrangements (A1, A3, A5–B3, B5)
- Sidney Sharp – string contractor (tracks A1, A3, A5–B3, B5), brass contractor (A1, A5, B1–B2)
- Mickey Crofford – instrumental overdubs recording engineer (tracks A3, A6–B1, B3, B5)

Bonus Track Personnel ("Blue Christmas", included on some re-releases)

- Elvis Presley — lead vocals, electric rhythm/lead guitar
- Scotty Moore – acoustic rhythm guitar
- D. J. Fontana – percussion
- Charlie Hodge – backing vocals, acoustic rhythm guitar
- Alan Fortas – percussion
- Lance LeGault – tambourine, possible backing vocals
- Steve Binder – producer
- Bones Howe – engineer

== Certifications ==
Provider	Level	Date
RIAA	3× Platinum	July 15, 1999
